= Neunkirchen am Potzberg =

- Municipality
- Coat of arms

- Location of Neunkirchen am Potzberg within Kusel district
- Interactive map of Neunkirchen am Potzberg
- Location within Germany Location within Rhineland-Palatinate
- Coordinates: 49°30′31″N 7°29′18″E
- Country: Germany
- State: Rhineland-Palatinate
- District: Kusel
- Municipal assoc.: Kusel-Altenglan

Government
  - Mayor (2019–24): Lilli Niebergall

Area
  - Total: 5.01 km^{2} (1.93 sq mi)
- Elevation: 315–355 m (1,033–1,165 ft)

Population (2025-12-31)
  - Total: 436
  - Density: 87.0/km^{2} (225/sq mi)
- Time zone: UTC+01:00 (CET)
  - Summer (DST): UTC+02:00 (CEST)
- Postal codes: 66887
- Dialling codes: 06385
- Vehicle registration: KUS
- Website: www.neunkirchen-am-potzberg.de

Neunkirchen am Potzberg (German pronunciation: [ˈnɔʏnkɪʁçn̩ ʔam ˈpɔtsbɛʁk], lit. 'Neunkirchen on the Potzberg') is an Ortsgemeinde – a municipality belonging to a Verbandsgemeinde, a kind of collective municipality – in the Kusel district in Rhineland-Palatinate, Germany. It belongs to the Verbandsgemeinde of Kusel-Altenglan, whose seat is in Kusel.

== Geography ==
=== Location ===
Neunkirchen am Potzberg lies southeast of the district seat of Kusel. The Potzberg, the “King of the Westrich” (an historic region that encompasses areas in both Germany and France) is a 562 m-high mountain in the Western Palatinate on whose southeast slope lies the village, roughly a kilometre below the peak (562.5 m above sea level). The main street runs crosswise over the slope and branching off it are a few dead-end streets both uphill and downhill. The village itself spreads out at an elevation from some 335 m above sea level to 350 m above sea level. The Limbach, a tributary to the Reichenbach (itself a tributary to the Glan) rises above the village. From the village, a wonderful view can be seen across the Reichenbach valley to the Heidenburg (castle) near Niederstaufenbach and to further mountains on the other side of the dale. The municipal area measures 501 ha, of which 137 ha is wooded. Neunkirchen also has a wildlife park, a lookout tower, a hotel and a hiking trail network.

=== Neighbouring municipalities ===
Neunkirchen am Potzberg borders in the north on the municipality of Föckelberg, in the east on the municipality of Oberstaufenbach, in the south on the municipality of Reichenbach-Steegen, in the west on the municipality of Matzenbach and in the northwest on the municipalities of Theisbergstegen and Rutsweiler am Glan.

=== Constituent communities ===
Also belonging to Neunkirchen am Potzberg are the outlying homesteads of Kreuzhof, east of the village, and Talhof, south of the village. These are both Aussiedlerhöfe, agricultural settlements established after the Second World War to increase food production. Standing on the road to Föckelberg are weekend houses.

=== Municipality’s layout ===
Neunkirchen's houses, which are spread out in a rather loose manner, stand for the most part on the through road, which leads from Föckelberg to Gimsbach. The oldest buildings go back to the 19th century. A few bigger farmhouses of the Westrichhaus type are still standing. Most of the rest are smaller farmhouses and workers’ houses. To be borne in mind with regard to the farmhouses is that very few of them are actually used by farmers. The church stands in the village's southwest end near the graveyard, which is ringed by a high, old wall built in 1729 with a lovely entrance gate. Within the village once stood two schoolhouses, where today classes are no longer held. For primary school classes for the surrounding villages, a new schoolhouse was built with four classrooms for a one-stream school.

== History ==
=== Antiquity ===
It is likely that the area around what is now Neunkirchen was settled in prehistoric times, though heaps of spoil within the municipal area likelier stem from mining than ancient gravedigging. According to a report in the Westrichkalender Kusel, a stone knife was found in a garden near the church at some unspecified time in the past. From Roman times comes a Jupiter Column that was unearthed in the cadastral area known as Lanzweiler. Furthermore, an old wall found underneath the village itself might be Roman in origin.

=== Middle Ages ===
According to the old border descriptions of the Remigiusland, Neunkirchen am Potzberg lay outside this holding of the Bishopric of Reims in the Westrich, and thus in the Free Imperial Domain (Reichsland), which stretched out over a broad swath of land around Castle Lautern. Just when Neunkirchen arose as a village is very hard to determine, but it was likely founded only in the 10th century. Ernst Christmann was of the opinion that a church that Otto the Great gave the Worms Cathedral Foundation in 937 as a donation was none other than the church in Neunkirchen am Potzberg. This opinion, though, is contradicted by historians today. Researchers M. Dolch and A. Greule, for example, hold that the church in question was the one in a place called Neunkirchen southeast of Kübelberg, known as “Neuenkirchen” in contrast to “Altenkirchen” (neu and alt are German for “new” and “old” respectively). They base their thesis on the assertion that the said church appears several times in documents from the 10th century, and that its location was more thoroughly described, as in 956 when it was described as being in a forest near the Cheuilinbahc (a brook now called the Kohlbach, and also likely the old name for Kübelberg, but certainly not for Schwedelbach). Therefore, Neunkirchen am Potzberg cannot be the same place as the Neunkirchen in the 937 document as was claimed by so many historians in days gone by (Widder, Frey and Gümbel among others). As early as the 15th century, this village in what is now the southern Kusel district was given up. Furthermore, Neunkirchen am Potzberg must also be distinguished from Neunkirchen an der Nahe, which like Medard was held by the Bishops of Verdun. Any reference to this relationship that crops up in a document about “Neunkirchen” must always have to do with Neunkirchen an der Nahe. In view of all these revisions to the body of knowledge about “Neunkirchen”, Neunkirchen am Potzberg's first documentary mention must be considered to be a 1329 document kept at the Munich Main State Archive (Hauptstaatsarchiv München), which contains the wording “zu Nunkyrchen”. According to this document, Count Georg I of Veldenz delivered to Dietrich Schwinde von Rittersdorf 100 pounds in Heller to be paid out of a comital estate near Neunkirchen am Potzberg. About this estate, which was called Horreys gut, nothing further is known. The Count may have owned an estate in the still free Reichsland from which he drew income to pay his vassals. The free Reichsland was then, in the earlier half of the 14th century, pledged to various regional lords. Neunkirchen am Potzberg thus passed in 1345 along with all the villages in the Amt of Reichenbach as an Imperial pledge to the Counts of Veldenz. While it is still not quite certain as to whether the 1329 document indeed deals with Neunkirchen am Potzberg when it refers to Horreys gut, it can be so assumed with certainty by what appears in a further documentary mention. This deals with a 1393 letter granting a widow's estate from Count Friedrich of Veldenz, which is reprinted in the Acta Academiae Theodoro-Palatinae. Yet another mention of Neunkirchen from late in Veldenz times is to be found in a 1430 document, according to which Siegfried Blick von Lichtenberg bequeathed to his wife Katharina money from, among other places, Neunkirchen in the amount of 2 pounds in Heller. It is clear that this means Neunkirchen am Potzberg from the addition of the phrase “in dem Konigrych” – “in the kingdom”. The Reichsland still existed, even if the king had pledged it. In 1444, the County of Veldenz met its end when Count Friedrich III of Veldenz died without a male heir. His daughter Anna wed King Ruprecht's son Count Palatine Stephan. By uniting his own Palatine holdings with the now otherwise heirless County of Veldenz – his wife had inherited the county, but not her father's title – and by redeeming the hitherto pledged County of Zweibrücken, Stephan founded a new County Palatine, as whose comital residence he chose the town of Zweibrücken: the County Palatine – later Duchy – of Palatinate-Zweibrücken. It is likely that throughout the Middle Ages, only a few houses stood around the church, only the rectory and the estate with various outbuildings. Likely more heavily settled was the now vanished village of Lanzweiler, lying somewhat lower down than Neunkirchen.

=== Modern times ===
In 1543, Count Palatine and later Duke Wolfgang of Zweibrücken transferred to his uncle Ruprecht lands for the founding of his own county palatine. Belonging to it were Veldenz on the Moselle, Lauterecken and later also the County of Veldenz-Lützelstein in Alsace. The Imperial pledged domains of the Ämter of Reichenbach and Jettenbach and also the Remigiusberg hill in the Remigiusland were grouped into this new county palatine, and along with them, the village of Neunkirchen. The County Palatine of Veldenz-Lauterecken-Lützelstein met its end in the late 17th century when the last Count Palatine died. Then, a years-long dispute arose between the Electorate of the Palatinate and the Duchy of Palatinate-Zweibrücken, who both claimed the right of succession in Palatinate-Veldenz. The dispute was settled in 1733 with the Veldenz Succession Treaty of Mannheim, under whose terms the Ämter of Veldenz and Lauterecken passed wholly to the Electorate of the Palatinate, and the former Palatine-Veldenz Amt of Lauterecken was permanently given the status of an Electorate of the Palatinate Oberamt, after it had already been occupied by the Electorate of the Palatinate troops in 1697 anyway. Neunkirchen am Potzberg thus became an Electorate of the Palatinate holding. Towards the end of the old feudal age, the Electorate of the Palatinate geographer and historiographer Johann Goswin Widder wrote the following about the village of Neunkirchen am Potzberg: “Neunkirchen, a handsome village lying three quarters of an hour westwards from Reichenbach on the Potzberg, is held to be the Nuninchirichaa (archaic name form for Neunkirchen) where King Otto donated a main church … as early as the year 936 to the Worms Cathedral Foundation. About Nuinchiricha, however, two other places that bear the name Nunkirch, and which also belong to the Nahegau must be considered … Now, this village has two churches, 63 houses, which are occupied by 63 families. The municipal area is made up of 880 Morgen of cropland, 186 Morgen of meadows, 326 Morgen of forest.”

==== Recent times ====
During the time of the French Revolution and the Napoleonic era that followed, the German lands on the Rhine’s left bank were annexed by France. With the new political arrangement and within the new boundaries, Neunkirchen am Potzberg found itself in the Mairie (“Mayoralty”) of Neunkirchen, the Canton of Wolfstein, the Arrondissement of Kaiserslautern and the Department of Mont-Tonnerre (or Donnersberg in German) whose seat was at Mainz. After French rule, the Congress of Vienna drew new boundaries yet again. After a transitional time, Neunkirchen am Potzberg was grouped into the bayerischer Rheinkreis, later known as Rheinpfalz (“Rhenish Palatinate”), an exclave of the Kingdom of Bavaria in 1816, where it was the seat of a Bürgermeisterei (“mayoralty”) at first within the Landcommissariat (today Landkreis or district) of Kusel and the Canton of Wolfstein. In the late 1920s and early 1930s, the Nazi Party (NSDAP) became quite popular in Neunkirchen am Potzberg. In the 1928 Reichstag elections, none of the local votes went to Adolf Hitler’s party, but by the 1930 Reichstag elections, this had grown to 7.4%. By the time of the 1933 Reichstag elections, after Hitler had already seized power, local support for the Nazis had swollen to 43.3%. Hitler’s success in these elections paved the way for his Enabling Act of 1933 (Ermächtigungsgesetz), thus starting the Third Reich in earnest. The Bürgermeisterei remained in force until administrative and regional reform in 1968. Belonging to this mayoralty were, besides Neunkirchen itself, the villages of Föckelberg and Oberstaufenbach, and until 1825 Mühlbach, too. Since 2018, Neunkirchen am Potzberg has been an Ortsgemeinde within the Verbandsgemeinde of Kusel-Altenglan. The municipality marked its 675-year jubilee (since the 1329 first documentary mention) in 2004.

=== Population development ===
Those living in Neunkirchen were originally mostly farmers and forestry workers, and at times miners who worked the Potzberg’s quicksilver pits. The number of inhabitants in the early 19th century was about as high as it is today, but in the mid 19th century, it broke the 500 level, only to shrink again to a level of 439 at the outbreak of the Second World War. After the war, the population at first rose again with the arrival of ethnic Germans driven out of Germany’s former eastern territories, but then about 1960 shrank again, only to rise once again. This new growth owed itself to the village’s proximity to the towns of Kaiserslautern and Kusel. Over the last few years, there has been stagnation in population growth. The original commercial relationships have over time undergone a significant shift. There are very few farms left, which has led to a population turnover characterized by older, long established families’ younger members moving away and new families moving in. Many people in the workforce nowadays earn livelihoods outside the village, commuting mainly to Kaiserslautern and Kusel.

The following table shows population development over the centuries for Neunkirchen am Potzberg, with some figures broken down by religious denomination:

Year	1788	1825	1835	1905	1939	1950	1961	1970	1978	1992	1998	2001
Total	63*	492	513	485	432	485	469	484	509	517	509	444
Catholic		105					82
Evangelical		280					387

*This figure is the number of families.

=== Municipality’s name ===
Within Germany, there are 17 places bearing the name Neunkirchen, not counting all the places bearing the name that have been forsaken over the ages. Relevant to this article are the Neunkirchen on the upper Nahe and a vanished village in the Schönenberg-Kübelberg area, and to a lesser extent, the town of Neunkirchen in the Saarland. As a rule, this placename means “new church” (neue Kirche in German), and not “nine churches” (neun Kirchen) as might be supposed. This may be so in Neunkirchen am Potzberg's case: a village arose near a country church that was built on the site of an older church (thus making it “new”). As discussed above, it is highly questionable whether the Nuinchiricha mentioned in Otto the Great's 937 document is the same one that stood in this village. There is, however, no doubt that the following are names borne by Neunkirchen am Potzberg over the ages: Nunkyrchen (1329), Nunkirchen (1393), Nuekirchen (1460), Neunkirchen (1524).

=== Vanished villages ===
Within what are now Neunkirchen am Potzberg's limits once supposedly lay a village called Landsweiler, although as far as is known currently, there is no documentary proof of its former existence. While there were originally only a few houses around the “new church” that gave Neunkirchen its name, Landsweiler was supposedly Neunkirchen's actual village core. According to this version of events, it was only after the Thirty Years' War that newcomers settling in the area around the church and others giving up the old village core combined to form the village core at the site where it can still be found today, and essentially formed the village of Neunkirchen as it is today. Another vanished village within Neunkirchen am Potzberg's limits is said to have been one called Einöd, named in 1393 as Einode. This is believed to have actually been little more than an out-of-the-way homestead.

== Religion ==
It is highly likely that during the Early Middle Ages the church on the Potzberg's northeast slope in Neunkirchen am Potzberg was the mother church for a series of villages in this region. It may well have been a wooden church on whose site in the 12th century a stone church was built. This church may have been remodelled many times in the centuries that followed in the Gothic style, bearing witness to which is a walled-up window that was discovered during restoration work in 1956. At some unknown time before the 14th century, this church became a branch within the parish of Deinsberg, today's Theisbergstegen. At the time of the irrevocable introduction of the Reformation into the Duchy of Palatinate-Zweibrücken, following the principle of cuius regio, eius religio, everyone in the village had to convert to Lutheran belief. When towards the end of the 16th century the Duchy converted to Reformed belief, Palatinate-Veldenz, to which Neunkirchen am Potzberg had belonged since 1543, did not embrace this newer faith and kept its people with Lutheranism, and likewise the church in the middle of the village, which was renovated sometime before 1700, remained Lutheran. Beginning in 1698, the Lutheran community once again formed its own parish, splitting away from Theisbergstegen. Growing in number bit by bit in the Potzberg area, though, was the number of Reformed Christians who clove to John Calvin’s teachings, and who found themselves greatly at odds with the Lutherans. At the same time, during French King Louis XIV's wars of conquest, the French were promoting Catholicism once again, and later so was the Electorate of the Palatinate. Growth continued on into the 19th century. In 1825, roughly a fifth of the inhabitants adhered to the Roman Catholic faith, and by 1961, this had reached almost 40%. The Reformed believers built a church for all their worshippers in the surrounding villages in Neunkirchen am Potzberg, which was completed in 1747. At that time, the following villages belonged to the Reformed parish: Neunkirchen, Oberstaufenbach, Föckelberg, Reichenbach, Reichenbachstegen, Albersbach, Kollweiler, Jettenbach, Haschbach am Remigiusberg, Rutsweiler am Glan, Mühlbach, Lauterecken, Heinzenhausen, Lohnweiler, Wiesweiler and Niedereisenbach. Later, Schwanden also belonged to the parish, while the last for villages named were removed from the Amt of Lauterecken. Thus Neunkirchen am Potzberg had two churches, as Johann Goswin Widder reported. The Reformed church was torn down in 1824. At the same time, the until now Lutheran church was thoroughly renovated and remodelled in the Historicist style with, among other things, a new 16 m-high ridge turret. Given that the Lutheran and Reformed churches had recently merged in the Protestant Union, only one Protestant church was now needed. Laid out all round the church building is the graveyard. Its girding wall dates from the Middle Ages. Today, the still self-administering Evangelical parish of Neunkirchen with its branches of Föckelberg and Niederstaufenbach belongs to the deaconry of Kusel. The Catholic Christians belong to the parish of Reichenbach.

== Politics ==
=== Municipal council ===
The council is made up of 8 council members, who were elected by majority vote at the municipal election held in May 2014, and the honorary mayor as chairman.

=== Mayor ===
Neunkirchen's mayor is Lilli Niebergall, and her deputies are Juergen Neu and Heike Heinz.

=== Coat of arms ===
The German blazon reads: Von Gold und Schwarz gespalten rechts eine rote Kirche, links ein rotgekrönter und bewehrter goldener Löwe.

The municipality's arms might in English heraldic language be described thus: Per pale Or a church gules and sable a lion rampant of the first armed, langued and crowned of the second.

The charge on the sinister (armsbearer's left, viewer's right) side, the lion, along with the tinctures Or and sable (gold and black) are drawn from the arms formerly borne by the Electorate of the Palatinate (House of Wittelsbach), which exercised lordly rights locally until the French Revolution. The charge on the dexter (armsbearer's right, viewer's left) side, the church, is canting for the municipality's name, whose meaning is “new church” (this would actually be neue Kirche in German, whereas neun Kirchen would generally be taken to mean “nine churches”; nonetheless, the former is held to be the meaning).

The arms have been borne since 1975.

== Culture and sightseeing ==
=== Buildings ===
The following are listed buildings or sites in Rhineland-Palatinate’s Directory of Cultural Monuments:

- Protestant parish church, Kirchbergstraße 9 – post-Baroque aisleless church with ridge turret, 1818, architect Paul Camille von Denis, Kaiserslautern; furnishings

=== Regular events ===
Neunkirchen am Potzberg’s kermis (church consecration festival) is held on the last weekend in July.

=== Clubs ===
Important clubs in Neunkirchen am Potzberg are:

- Förderverein Neunkirchen — Neunkirchen promotional association
- Krankenpflegeverein — nursing association
- Landfrauenverein — countrywomen’s club
- Männergesangverein — men’s singing club
- Obst- und Gartenbauverein — fruitgrowing and gardening club
- SPD-Ortsverein — Social Democratic Party of Germany local chapter
- Sportverein — sport club
- Verein zur Unterstützung der Freiwilligen Feuerwehr — association for supporting the fire brigade

== Economy and infrastructure ==
=== Economic structure ===
Originally, Neunkirchen am Potzberg was purely a farming village. With the opening of the quicksilver mines in the Potzberg area, workers’ dwellings also sprang up. In 1930, about half the village's population worked only at agriculture. Even by 1970 still 60% of those in the workforce were somehow linked to agriculture, but likewise by then, many farming operations had become secondary businesses. Farming has further declined since then. There are now only three farming operations run as primary income earners, and only three run as secondary income earners. Thus many in the workforce must commute to jobs elsewhere, mainly in the region around Kusel and Kaiserslautern. In the village itself are a few businesses and inns. An expansion in the tourism sector can be foreseen.

=== Education ===
Schooling was generally promoted by the lords after the introduction of the Reformation, but ended in the course of the Thirty Years' War, enjoying a new upswing only in the 18th century. No knowledge about Neunkirchen am Potzberg's school history in feudal times has reached the present day. In the course of the French Revolution, schooling was nationalized. At the time there were two schools in Neunkirchen, a Lutheran one and a Reformed one. Both were still being held in private dwellings, and both were also subject to the Kaiserslautern school inspectorate. In April 1860, the Kingdom of Bavaria took over both schools. In 1824, many of the villagers were of the opinion that the old Calvinist church should be converted into a schoolhouse, but this never came about and instead it was torn down. However, the stone recovered from this work was at least reused for building the new Protestant schoolhouse, known as the “great schoolhouse” (großes Schulhaus). This work was likewise undertaken in 1824. One hundred years later, in 1924, the village got yet another schoolhouse, a smaller one that housed a Catholic school. In 1968, the old village school was dissolved. Ever since, Hauptschule students have been attending classes in Altenglan. Neunkirchen's primary school pupils at first went to a communal school in both Neunkirchen and Föckelberg. In Neunkirchen in 1994, a new schoolhouse with four classrooms was built where primary school pupils from Neunkirchen, Föckelberg, Oberstaufenbach and Niederstaufenbach are now taught. Currently this amounts to some 90 schoolchildren. Higher schools in the area are the Regionale Schule in Altenglan, the Realschule in Kusel and the Gymnasium in Kusel. Neunkirchen also has one kindergarten and a library.

=== Transport ===
Neunkirchen am Potzberg lies on Landesstraße 364, which near Oberstaufenbach branches off Landesstraße 367 (Bosenbach – Kaiserslautern), leads to Gimsbach on the Glan and then ends at Bundesstraße 423. Two Kreisstraßen lead from Neunkirchen to neighbouring villages, Kreisstraße 34 by way of Föckelberg to Altenglan and Kreisstraße 33 by way of the Kreuzhof to Fockenberg-Limbach. To the southwest runs the Autobahn A 62 (Kaiserslautern–Trier). The nearest interchanges are the ones at Kusel (10 km) and Glan-Münchweiler (15 km). There is a further one at Kaiserslautern West (Vogelweh), lying 25 km away. Theisbergstegen and Altenglan stations (6 km away) are on the Landstuhl–Kusel railway and are served hourly by Regionalbahn service RB 67 to and from Kaiserslautern, called the Glantalbahn (the name of which refers to the Glan Valley Railway, which shared some of the route of the Landstuhl–Kusel line, including through the former railway junction at Altenglan and Theisbergstegen).

== Famous people ==
=== Sons and daughters of the town ===
- Ludwig Roediger (b. 1798; d. 1866 in Frankfurt), theologian, paedagogue, philosopher; well known participant at the Wartburg Festival in 1817; arrested for his beliefs in freedom; later prorector at a Gymnasium in Frankfurt am Main.
- Armin O. Huber (b. 1904; d. 1977 in Neustadt an der Weinstraße), globetrotter and travel writer, writer of many travel books and adventure novels, collector, son of the pastor Dr. Friedrich Huber from Contwig; his mother was from Neunkirchen
- Domenik Hixon (1984–), American football player (New York Giants wide receiver and kick returner)
