= Bosenbach =

- Municipality
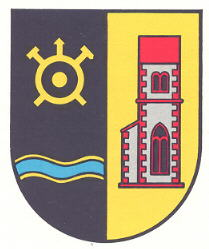
- Coat of arms

- Location of Bosenbach within Kusel district
- Interactive map of Bosenbach
- Location within Germany Location within Rhineland-Palatinate
- Coordinates: 49°32′22″N 7°31′57″E
- Country: Germany
- State: Rhineland-Palatinate
- District: Kusel
- Municipal assoc.: Kusel-Altenglan

Government
  - Mayor (2019–24): Martin Volles

Area
  - Total: 8.14 km^{2} (3.14 sq mi)
- Elevation: 252 m (827 ft)

Population (2025-12-31)
  - Total: 717
  - Density: 88.1/km^{2} (228/sq mi)
- Time zone: UTC+01:00 (CET)
  - Summer (DST): UTC+02:00 (CEST)
- Postal codes: 66887
- Dialling codes: 06385
- Vehicle registration: KUS
- Website: altenglan.de

Bosenbach (German pronunciation: [ˈboːzn̩bax]) is an Ortsgemeinde – a municipality belonging to a Verbandsgemeinde, a kind of collective municipality – in the Kusel district in Rhineland-Palatinate, Germany. It belongs to the Verbandsgemeinde of Kusel-Altenglan, whose seat is in Kusel.

== Geography ==
=== Location ===
The municipality lies in the Kusel Musikantenland ("Musicians’ Land") in the Western Palatinate. Bosenbach lies at an elevation of some 250 m above sea level in the valley of its namesake brook, the Bosenbach, which rises near Jettenbach and flows into Bosenbach from the southeast after being joined by the Klingelbach. The Bosenbach is further fed in the village core by the Walschbach from the south and the Lanzenbach from the north, and then flows farther westwards, being further strengthened by the Schambach coming from the north before emptying into the Reichenbach, itself a tributary to the river Glan. The elevations up the sides of the dales in the north reach heights of more than 400 m above sea level on the slopes of the Herrmannsberg (Schmutzerhübel 416 m), in the northeast in the foothills of the Bornberg more than 500 m above sea level, and in the south more than 300 m above sea level (Hertle-Wald 338 m). Interesting rural cadastral toponyms in Bosenbach include “Selgut”, which could be interpreted as meaning “Soul Estate” – it might well once have been an endowment to the church in the hopes of securing Salvation – and “Kastellwiese” (“Castrum Meadow”), supposedly a reference to a Roman castrum here, although this is rather doubtful. The municipal area measures 816 ha, of which 563 ha is given over to agricultural use and 132 ha is wooded. The rest is meadow and fields.

=== Neighbouring municipalities ===
Bosenbach borders in the north on the municipality of Elzweiler, in the northeast on the municipality of Eßweiler, in the east on the municipality of Jettenbach, in the southeast on the municipality of Reichenbach-Steegen, in the south on the municipality of Niederstaufenbach, in the southwest on the municipality of Föckelberg and in the west on the municipality of Altenglan. Bosenbach also meets the municipality of Welchweiler at a single point in the north.

=== Constituent communities ===
Bosenbach has an outlying Ortsteil called Friedelhausen, which was amalgamated with the municipality on 1 January 1971 in the course of administrative restructuring in Rhineland-Palatinate. Also belonging to Bosenbach is the outlying homestead of Kelterhof, an Aussiedlerhof (farmstead established after the Second World War to enhance food production) built about 1970, but which is now no longer worked as a farm.

=== Municipality’s layout ===
Before the Thirty Years' War, Bosenbach actually had two centres. The smaller one in the west was known as Oberbosenbach or das Oberdorf (“the upper village”). Both centres had grown together by the late 19th century since the building of the road now known as Landesstraße 370 about 1844. As early as the 15th century, a small church stood in the middle of the village, as opposed to the Feldkirche (“Field Church”) outside the village. This village church was built in its current form in 1802. The originally loosely built clump village has since spread into the side dales. The way in which the built-up area has developed still clearly shows its original character as a farming village. Also living in Bosenbach then, however, were craftsmen, stonemasons and musicians. In the 18th century, the Lanzenbach drove a small mill, which owing to longstanding disputes with the miller was bought out by the villagers. About 1850, some farmers built a coöperative mill, which was run until the early 20th century. This stood at about at the same elevation as the old mill, but on the other side of the brook. The graveyard lies to the east, far outside the village on the road going towards Friedelhausen and Altenglan. Well known is the tower of the former Wolfskirche (“Wolf’s Church”) on the graveyard lands with its paintings from the Middle Ages. The sporting ground lies in the east, outside the village on the road leading to Jettenbach.

== History ==
=== Antiquity ===
When the old Wolfskirche was torn down, it was suggested to the pastor that he turn all Roman artifacts, which were still being kept there, over to Speyer. In 1825, a hundred Roman copper coins were found near Bosenbach. These came from an urnfield. A grave hollow with five urns was hewn into a cliffside near the village. Today in the Wolfskirche tower's stonework, building blocks from Roman times can still be found, some with inscriptions. a fragment of a Roman “god stone” is incorporated into the entrance portal to the graveyard. A sculpture from Roman times, a lion tearing at an animal that it has caught and a relief can be found in the church's sanctuary. Northeast of Bosenbach ran an old Roman road leading from Landstuhl to Trier.

=== Middle Ages ===
In 945, Bosenbach had its first documentary mention when Otto I, Holy Roman Emperor, granted his faithful follower Franko a few landholds. To better describe where these landholds lay, both Reichenbach and Bosenbach were named. Either Franko or his heirs yielded these lands shortly after 945 to Saint Maximin's Abbey in Trier. Until about 1100, Bosenbach was listed time and again as being among the monastery's holdings. Territorially, Bosenbach belonged to the Imperial Domain (Reichsland) around Kaiserslautern and about 1130, it came to be held as a Palatine fief by the Counts of Veldenz. About 1282, the Amt of Bosenbach (Bosenbach, Niederstaufenbach and Friedelhausen) was held in common ownership by the Counts of Veldenz and the Waldgraves. Later, in the 14th and 15th centuries, the common ownership had ended and it was owned by the Waldgraves and Rhinegraves (one group). In 1595, through territorial trade, the Amt found its way back into the Duchy of Palatine Zweibrücken. From the years 1514, 1537 and 1578 come three Weistümer dealing with Bosenbach (a Weistum – cognate with English wisdom – was a legal pronouncement issued by men learned in law in the Middle Ages and early modern times; Weistümer is the plural).

=== Modern times ===
Ecclesiastical law at the time of the Reformation was made jointly by the Counts Palatine of Zweibrücken and the Counts Palatine of Palatinate-Veldenz. Only towards the end of the 16th century did the Duke of Palatinate-Zweibrücken alone exercise this function, using it to force the subjects to convert to the Reformed faith. In 1595, the Amt of Bosenbach also became territorially part of the Duchy of Palatinate-Zweibrücken, Oberamt of Lichtenberg. During the Thirty Years' War, the Schultheißerei of Bosenbach was abolished and combined with the court region of Eßweiler Tal. In Bosenbach itself, after the war, lived only one fifth as many people as before the war. Only about 1700 did the Schultheißerei once again become separate.

==== Recent times ====
After the new order introduced during French Revolutionary and Napoleonic times, Bosenbach became the seat of a mairie (“mayoralty”). In Bavarian times, too, the village was the mayoral seat for several villages. At the same time, a taxation authority was located in Bosenbach. Both offices would exercise their functions until administrative restructuring in Rhineland-Palatinate and the formation of Verbandsgemeinden in 1972. As early as 1816, several Bürgermeistereien (“mayoralties”) acquired a communal hand-pumped fire engine, which until 1870 was kept at a fire station in Bosenbach, whose location was central to the municipalities involved. Bosenbach was also the location of the forester's office for the forest region of Bosenbach. In the 1933 Reichstag elections, the people of Bosenbach voted 86.3% for Adolf Hitler and his Nazi Party (NSDAP). On 1 January 1971, Friedelhausen was amalgamated with Bosenbach.

=== Population development ===
Bosenbach was inhabited not only by farmers, but also by the craftsmen who would normally be found in such a village. Quite early on, though, there were also workers who worked in the stone quarries, coalmines and chalk mines. Today, agriculture plays only a subordinate role. The village is today home to people of the most varied of occupations, who must commute to work. With respect to religion, the overwhelming majority belong to the Evangelical denomination of Christianity. Population figures rose steadily from about 500 in the early 19th century to roughly 900 in the late 20th century, then growth stagnated and recently there has been a slight drop.

The following table shows population development over the centuries for Bosenbach, with some figures broken down by religious denomination:

| Year | 1608 | 1825 | 1835 | 1871 | 1905 | 1939 | 1961 | 2003 |
| Total | 165 | 553 | 597 | 641 | 663 | 672 | 694 | 609 |
| Evangelical | | 165 | | | | | 656 |
| Catholic | | 65 | | | | | 36 |
| Jewish | | 20 | | | | | – |

=== Municipality’s name ===
The placename ending —bach (“brook”) is combined in the village's name with the element Baso, which goes back to an early Frankish personal name. The village has borne the following names over the ages: Basinbahc (945); Basinbach (latter half of the 14th century); Basenbecher ampt (1393); Basenbach (1417); Boßenbach (1567); Bosenbach.

== Religion ==
In earliest times, Bosenbach belonged to the parish of Deinsberg (Theißberg). In 1323, a chaplaincy for the later ecclesiastical region of Bosenbach was built and given its own chaplain. The Feldkirche (“Field Church”) outside the village, which had already been standing before the turn of the second millennium, was granted burying rights by 1323. Buried here were the dead from the villages of Bosenbach, Friedelhausen and Niederstaufenbach.

The Bosenbach chaplaincy also remained in existence in the time of the Reformation. During the Reformation, the Lutheran faith was introduced into the parish of Bosenbach. This changed with the change in religion made by Duke Johannes I of Zweibrücken in 1588, in which he made Reformed teaching the duchy's religion. In 1566, the parish of Bosenbach was founded. The at first Lutheran parish comprised the villages of Bosenbach, Friedelhausen and Niederstaufenbach. At times, the villages of Neunkirchen am Potzberg, Oberstaufenbach and Föckelberg, which belonged to the ecclesiastical region of Neunkirchen, were also tended by Bosenbach. In 1601, Eßweiler, which had belonged to the parish of Hirsau, was merged into the parish of Bosenbach. The Reformed parish of Bosenbach remained in existence on into the Thirty Years' War, and the pastor also had to tend the villages in the Eßweiler Tal (dale). In 1637 (during the war), the parochial seat was shifted from Bosenbach to Hinzweiler. Owing to the great loss of population, the pastor's post was not filled again until 1671 (23 years after the war's end). Once it was, the pastor also had to tend the villages in the parish of Altenglan. Only in 1746 did that parish once again become fully autonomous, and Bosenbach acquired Eßweiler once again as a parochial branch. The parish now comprised the three villages of Bosenbach, Eßweiler and Niederstaufenbach. This arrangement remained in place until the beginning of 1971 when the parish was dissolved. Today, Bosenbach and Niederstaufenbach belong to the parish of Rothselberg.

In 1709, ecclesiastical regions were established for the Lutherans in the Oberamt of Lichtenberg, with one with Bosenbach as its hub to which the Reformed followers made their church available. The Lutherans did not get their own minister, though. It was 1744 before the two ecclesiastical regions of Bosenbach/Ulmet and Eßweiler Tal were transferred to a pastor. In 1818, these parishes were dissolved with the merger of Lutheranism and Calvinism.

In the summer of 1893, a few families in Bosenbach approached the Inner Mission. This tendency, however, had already run its course within a year. Only a deep religiosity remained in a few families in the village.

In the 18th century, Bosenbach's Catholics belonged to the Catholic parish of Kusel, passing about 1800 to the Catholic parish of Reichenbach. In Bosenbach the church could be shared with members of other denominations. Even today, Reichenbach is the parish seat for the few Catholics in Bosenbach.

The first Jew in Bosenbach was named as early as 1704. Towards the end of the 18th century there were at least three Jewish families living in the village. In the 19th century, there were five from time to time. By the beginning of the 20th century, though, no more Jews were living in Bosenbach.

== Politics ==
=== Municipal council ===
The council is made up of 12 council members, who were elected by majority vote at the municipal election held on 7 June 2009, and the honorary mayor as chairman.

=== Mayor ===
Bosenbach's mayor is Martin Volles.

=== Coat of arms ===
The German blazon reads: Von schwarz und gold gespalten, rechts über einem gesenkten goldbesäumten blauen Wellenbalken zwei gekreuzte goldene Hämmer, belegt mit dem Zeichen des Planeten Uranus in Gold, links ein rotgefasster und -gedeckter silberner Kirchturm mit gotischem Maßwerkfenster und romanischen Schallöffnungen in schwarz.

The municipality's arms might in English heraldic language be described thus: Per pale sable in chief a Uranus symbol surmounting a hammer and pick per saltire, the whole Or and in base a fess wavy of the second surmounted by a narrower one azure, and Or a churchtower argent with quoins, roof, Gothic tracery windowframes and Romanesque sound holes gules, the window glass of the first.

The churchtower charge on the sinister (armsbearer's left, viewer's right) side is a depiction of the one at the well known Wolfskirche (“Wolf’s Church”) near Bosenbach. The Uranus symbol on the dexter (armsbearer's right, viewer's left) side recalls the limestone mining in the two centres of Bosenbach and Friedelhausen until 1971. This symbol is also to be seen at the old mine entrance. The wavy fess in dexter base is canting for the placename ending —bach, which in German means “brook”. It also stands for the brook running through the municipality, which has the same name. Just as the charges themselves stand for the local art, economy and landscape, the tinctures stand for the municipality's historical lords. The gules and Or (red and gold) on the sinister side were the tinctures borne by the Waldgraves, who held sway until 1595, and the sable and Or (black and gold) on the dexter side were the Palatine colours.

== Culture and sightseeing ==
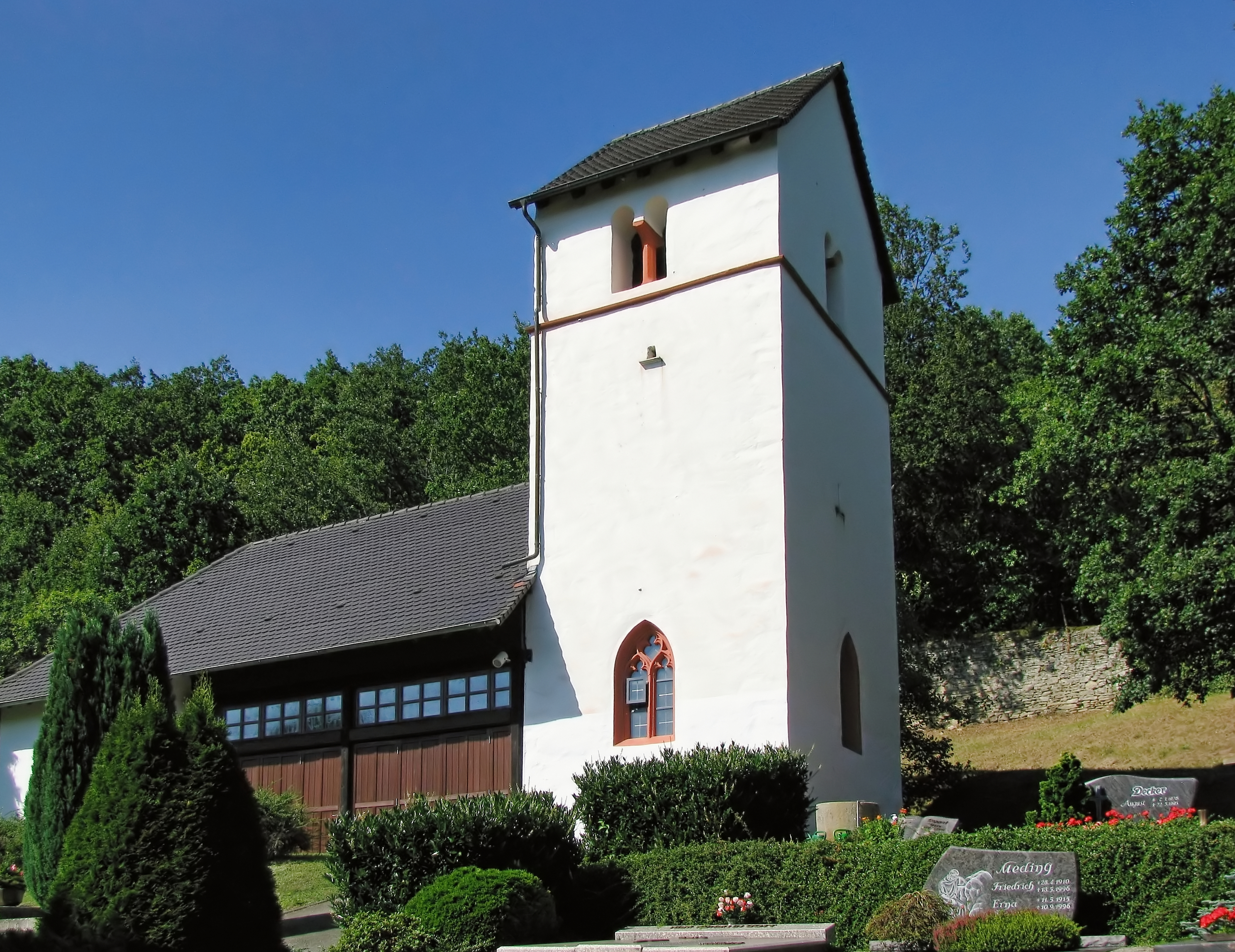
Bosenbach, Hauptstraße: tower of the so-called Wolfskirche

=== Buildings ===
The following are listed buildings or sites in Rhineland-Palatinate’s Directory of Cultural Monuments:

==== Bosenbach (main centre) ====
- Protestant church, Hauptstraße 23 – post-Baroque aisleless church with ridge turret, marked 1802; bells: 1474 by Johann Otto, Kaiserslautern, 1746 by Christoph Klein, Schwarzenacker; furnishings
- At Eckstraße 3 – richly decorated stone oven pedestal, marked 1801
- Hauptstraße 5 – former Protestant rectory; sandstone-framed building with half-hipped roof, 1830/1831, architect Heinrich Ernst, Kaiserslautern; barn 1820/1821
- Tower of the so-called Wolfskirche (“Wolf’s Church”), Hauptstraße – former east quire tower, about 1310, yellow sandstone, foundation Roman walling; painting about 1330/1340, Roman sculpture group (see also below)

==== Friedelhausen ====
- Im Brühl – Alte Brücke (“Old Bridge”); one-arch quarrystone bridge, 1764

==== Wolfskirche ====
Among the oldest churches in the region is the former countryside church near Bosenbach, the Wolfskirche (“Wolf’s Church”), which is among the Palatinate's most important cultural monuments. This church, which stands outside the village in the ancient graveyard, comes from the Middle Ages. Since there was a separate church in the village, the countryside church fell ever further into disrepair, until eventually, in 1834, the nave was torn down. The last relic of this church left standing was the churchtower with its fresco-secco paintings. These wall paintings are from the 14th century, and such artworks are otherwise only known from examples found in Italy. During thorough renovations in 1985, a dendrochronological investigation of the roof frame yielded the knowledge that the wood had come from trees felled in 1310. The roof frame itself would have been built a few years later. The masonry in this east quire tower is reckoned to date from the transitional time between Romanesque and Gothic. The fresco-secco paintings, which were first painted over in the time of the Reformation, were laid bare in 1952. About 1970, a graveyard hall was built onto the tower.

As early as 1442, there was a village church in Bosenbach, consecrated to Saint Anthony, as well as the Wolfskirche in the countryside. This church, which may have been only a prayer hall, was given up in the face of disrepair and thus, a new one was built in 1591. This church was open until 1802 to members of all three denominations (Catholic, Lutheran and Calvinist), but it was owned outright by the Reformed church (Calvinist).

Then, that same year, the Calvinists built a new, bigger church in the middle of the village. This Late Baroque church with its belltower, with the style of spire known as a welsche Haube, presents itself in a good state of repair in Bosenbach's village core. Found here, too, are the parish's two old bells. The older of the two comes from 1474 and hung together with two others until 1591 in the tower at the Wolfskirche. Its Latin inscription reads: o rex glorie criste veni cvm pace m cccc lxxiiii ave maria (“O King of glory Christ, come with peace 1474 hail Mary”). The other bell was poured in 1746 in Bosenbach and bears the German inscription Jauchzet dem Herrn alle Welt, singet, rühmt und lobet ihn (Cheer the Lord, all the world, sing, praise and laud Him”). Until the church renovations in 1990 and 1991, there was a sundial at the village church, originally from 1851, although that one was replaced with a new one in 1963.

The village's graveyard out by the Wolfskirche already existed in the 14th century. Until the late 19th century, it served the villages of Bosenbach, Friedelhausen and Niederstaufenbach together as a place to bury their dead. Today it is still used only by Bosenbach.

=== Regular events ===
The kermis (church consecration festival, locally known as the Kerwe) is held each year on the last weekend in August. The old custom of the Kerwestrauß is still observed at this festival, complete with the Straußrede (“bouquet speech”). Older villagers still remember the custom of the Brezeltanz (“pretzel dance”).

=== Clubs ===
- Arbeiteruntzerstützungs- und Musikverein (Workers’ Support and Music Club)
- Feuerwehr-Förderverein (Fire Brigade Promotional Association)
- Freiwillige Feuerwehr (Volunteer Fire Brigade)
- Freizeitclub “Club 81” Bosenbach (“Free Time” Club)
- Gesangverein 1862 (Singing Club)
- Krankenpflegeverein Bosenbach-Niederstaufenbach (Nursing Club)
- Landfrauenverein (Countrywomen's Club)
- Pfälzerwaldverein (“Palatinate Forest” Hiking Club)
- SPD-Ortsverein (Local SPD Association)
- Tennisverein 1986 (Tennis Club)
- Tischtennisverein (Table Tennis Club)
- Turn- u. Sportverein (Gymnastic and Sport Club)

In 1832 there was a Pressverein – Press Club – in Bosenbach.

=== Natural monuments ===
Bosenbach has limetrees both in the village and out at the graveyard.

== Economy and infrastructure ==
=== Economic structure ===
Towards the end of the 18th century, the predominant form of cropraising was the three-field system. Given the unfavourable location – the village lay in the dale and most fields were up on the hillsides – fields had to be worked under the burden of a great overhead. There was winegrowing at one time, but the Thirty Years' War put an end to this. The fields themselves took the form of small plots, criss-crossing short strips of cropland. In the municipal area's west, however, block-shaped fields were also seen. In the 18th century, there was a small mill. In the latter half of the 19th century, another mill was built and used as a coöperative. Chalk was already being mined in the 16th century. The mine's galleries, though, which still exist, may for safety reasons not be visited.

In the 18th century, Bosenbach's craftsmen joined those in the Eßweiler Tal in three guilds. The village had a few craft businesses that were typical of the village, which were needed to supply the local people.

There were also the Wandermusikanten, travelling musicians who plied their trade all over Europe and even overseas as well. As early as 1840, the local clergymen were bemoaning this growing Musikantentum, but later they praised it. Right up until the years just before the Second World War, Bosenbach had a considerable share of the region's Wandermusikanten. For more information about this once thriving endeavour, see the Musikanten and Otto Schwarz sections of the Hinzweiler article as well as the article on the West Palatine travelling music tradition.

In the 20th century, there were many quarrymen who worked at the Schneeweiderhof stone quarry in Eßweiler.

Today, though, Bosenbach is a commuter community. With an exception, everybody works outside the village.

=== Education ===
Already by the late 16th century, the pastor was holding school in Bosenbach. Since there was no pastor posted to the village after the Thirty Years' War, the villagers temporarily hired a schoolmaster (as early as 1651). Once the parish had been reëstablished in 1671, the job of schooling once more fell to the pastor. Only beginning in the early 18th century was there a separate school in Bosenbach. Late in 1784, a new, Reformed schoolhouse was opened. This school had an upper floor added in 1837. Bosenbach then had a two-stream school until sometime after 1960. Today, primary school pupils and Hauptschule students attend their respective schools in Altenglan. Higher schools are available in Kusel.

=== Public institutions ===
Located in Bosenbach are a kindergarten and an outdoor swimming pool.

=== Public facilities ===
Bosenbach was hooked up to the electrical grid only after the First World War. On the other hand, the village had already installed a network of watermains by 1895.

=== Transport ===
Coming from Friedelhausen, Landesstraße 370 runs through the village and links Bosenbach with the neighbouring village of Jettenbach. In the middle of the village, a Kreisstraße (District Road) branches off towards Niederstaufenbach. To the southwest runs the Autobahn A 62 (Kaiserslautern–Trier) with the Kusel interchange 8 km away. Kaiserslautern is 35 km away by road. Serving nearby Altenglan is Altenglan station on the Landstuhl–Kusel railway. There are hourly trains at this station throughout the day, namely Regionalbahn service RB 67 between Kaiserslautern and Kusel, named Glantalbahn after a former railway line that shared a stretch of its tracks with the Landstuhl–Kusel railway, including the former railway junction at Altenglan).
