= Föckelberg =

- Municipality
- Coat of arms

- Location of Föckelberg within Kusel district
- Interactive map of Föckelberg
- Location within Germany Location within Rhineland-Palatinate
- Coordinates: 49°31′28″N 7°29′24″E
- Country: Germany
- State: Rhineland-Palatinate
- District: Kusel
- Municipal assoc.: Kusel-Altenglan

Government
  - Mayor (2019–24): Frank Winter

Area
  - Total: 3.97 km^{2} (1.53 sq mi)
- Elevation: 380–465 m (1,247–1,526 ft)

Population (2025-12-31)
  - Total: 347
  - Density: 87.4/km^{2} (226/sq mi)
- Time zone: UTC+01:00 (CET)
  - Summer (DST): UTC+02:00 (CEST)
- Postal codes: 66887
- Dialling codes: 06385
- Vehicle registration: KUS

Föckelberg is an Ortsgemeinde – a municipality belonging to a Verbandsgemeinde, a kind of collective municipality – in the Kusel district in Rhineland-Palatinate, Germany. It belongs to the Verbandsgemeinde of Kusel-Altenglan, whose seat is in Kusel.

== Geography ==
=== Location ===
The municipality lies in the Western Palatinate between roughly 400 and 450 m above sea level. Indeed, within Föckelberg's limits is found a peak of 562.5 m on the road leading from Mühlbach (an Ortsteil of Altenglan) to Neunkirchen and onwards round the peak to Gimsbach. This is the Potzberg, upon which stands the 35 m-tall Potzberg Tower. The distance to the Potzberg from the village is roughly 1 km as the crow flies and 2 km by road. From the village itself, there is an outstanding view of the mountainous countryside east of the Potzberg. Föckelberg shares the Wildpark Potzberg (game park) with Neunkirchen am Potzberg. The municipal area measures 209 ha, of which 95 ha is wooded and roughly 3 ha is settled.

=== Neighbouring municipalities ===
Föckelberg borders in the north on the municipality of Bosenbach, in the east on the municipality of Niederstaufenbach, in the southeast on the municipality of Oberstaufenbach, in the south on the municipality of Neunkirchen am Potzberg, in the west on the municipality of Rutsweiler am Glan and in the northwest on the municipality of Altenglan.

=== Constituent communities ===
Also belonging to Föckelberg is the outlying homestead of Potzberghotel.

=== Municipality’s layout ===
Föckelberg is a linear village – by some definitions, a “thorpe” – with a loose built-up area; from the Middle Ages onwards, it was a village characterized purely by agriculture. The homesteads stood either side of the road. When many quicksilver mines opened around the Potzberg's peak in the latter half of the 18th century, workers also settled in Föckelberg, and the population figure rose noticeably. Nevertheless, the built-up area did not expand appreciably, for the miners built their houses between the homesteads that were already standing. There has never been a church in Föckelberg. Of all the public buildings, only the former schoolhouse, which has been converted into a village community centre, is worthy of note. The graveyard lies in the village's south end at the side of the road that leads to Neunkirchen am Potzberg. The village sporting ground lies almost at the end of the road that runs up to the Potzberg's peak.

== History ==
=== Antiquity ===
Without a doubt, the area around Föckelberg was already settled in prehistoric times. Today, however, archaeologists can no longer tell, short of conducting digs, which of the many mounds on the Potzberg are Celtic barrows and which are tailing heaps from the former mining industry. Experts do not even agree on whether there are indeed barrows among these mounds. In Roman times, too, the area around Föckelberg was settled, bearing witness to which are some archaeological finds from that time made in the neighbouring village of Neunkirchen.

=== Middle Ages ===
Just when Föckelberg first arose as a village cannot be determined today. Places with names ending in —berg only arose, going by what is commonly known, quite late, often only in the 10th century. According to old border descriptions of the Remigiusland, the village lay outside the Reims holdings in the Westrich, an historic region that encompasses areas in both Germany and France, and thus in the Free Imperial Domain (Reichsland) in the broad area surrounding the Royal Castle Lautern. This Reichsland was pledged from Imperial power to territorial princes during the reigns of Emperors Ludwig IV (“the Bavarian”; 1314–1347) and Karl IV (1346-1378). Thus, all villages in the Amt of Reichenbach passed in 1345 as an Imperial pledge to Count Georg I of Veldenz. Even though Föckelberg's first documentary mention would not come until 1397, this certainly included Föckelberg, for it had existed for a few centuries already before its first mention. The Imperial pledge was never redeemed by the Holy Roman Empire, and so all these villages, along with Föckelberg, remained under the Counts of Veldenz. In 1444, Frederick III, Count of Veldenz, the last from the Hohengeroldseck family to rule the county, died without a male heir; the county passed to his son-in-law Stephen, Count Palatine of Simmern-Zweibrücken (son of Rupert, King of Germany), widower of Frederick's daughter, Anna of Veldenz. Stephen, combining his lands, created the new County Palatine of Zweibrücken, which in the fullness of time came to be known as the Duchy of Palatinate-Zweibrücken.

=== Modern times ===
Like all villages in the area, Föckelberg, too, saw a great deal of suffering in the 17th century's wars, namely the Thirty Years' War and French King Louis XIV’s wars of conquest. Details of the misfortunes wrought upon Föckelberg itself in these wars are unknown, but something does survive from that time: a Huberweistum (a Huber was a farmer who owned a whole hide of land, while a Weistum – cognate with English wisdom – was a legal pronouncement issued by men learned in law in the Middle Ages and early modern times) from the municipality of Föckelberg. The Föckelberg Weistum was set down in writing in 1671. The first part deals with the redefinition of the hides (fields) within municipal limits, and then the document goes on to lay down the rules of conduct for the farmers. It was presented to the farmers each year on Saint Thomas's Day (then 21 December) on the occasion of the walking of the fields. In 1543, Wolfgang, Count Palatine of Zweibrücken, transferred to his uncle and former regent Rupert holdings so that he could found his own county palatine. Belonging to this were Veldenz on the Moselle, the Ämter of Lauterecken and Reichenbach, the Remigiusberg and later also Lützelstein (now called La Petite-Pierre) in Alsace. The residence town was at first Lauterecken. The line of the Counts Palatine of Veldenz-Lauterecken-Lützelstein died out in 1694, and the County Palatine of Veldenz passed in 1717, after disagreements between Electoral Palatinate and Palatinate-Zweibrücken, to Electoral Palatinate, although this was only made permanent in 1733 by the Mannheim Treaty of Succession. In line with this development, Föckelberg belonged from 1344 to 1444 to the old County of Veldenz, from 1444 to 1543 to the Duchy of Palatinate-Zweibrücken, from 1543 to 1694 to the new County Palatine of Veldenz, and beginning in 1733 to Electoral Palatinate. In 1788, Föckelberg was mentioned in Goswin Widder's Geographische Beschreybung der Kurpfalz (“Geographical Description of Electoral Palatinate”). This says, among other things: “Föckelberg is a midsize village at the Potzberg. … The population of this village is made up of 39 families, 176 souls, the buildings of 30 private and 3 common houses, the municipal area of 501 Morgen in cropfields, 110 Morgen in meadows and 406 Morgen in woodland. Found on the Potzberg is a quicksilver mine, called Elisabethengrube, from which in the year 1477, 2,520 pounds of quicksilver was mined.” The “common houses” to which Widder referred (gemeine Häuser in the original German text) may have been buildings available for use to all villagers, for instance, the herdsman's house or the bakehouse. Electoral Palatinate rule came to an end when French Revolutionary troops marched into Germany in the late 18th century.

==== Recent times ====
The Revolutionary troops occupied the German lands on the Rhine’s left bank and annexed them to France. After a thorough territorial reorganization in 1801, Föckelberg belonged to the Mairie (“Mayoralty”) of Neunkirchen, the Canton of Wolfstein, the Arrondissement of Kaiserslautern and the Department of Mont-Tonnerre (or Donnersberg in German), whose seat was at Mainz. In the Bavarian time that followed, beginning in 1816, the village belonged within the Bayerischer Rheinkreis (the bulk of the Palatinate that the Congress of Vienna had awarded to the Kingdom of Bavaria) to the Landkommissariat of Kusel, the canton of Wolfstein and the Bürgermeisterei (“Mayoralty”) of Neunkirchen.

In the late 1920s and early 1930s, the Nazi Party (NSDAP) had variable fortunes in Föckelberg. In the 1928 Reichstag elections, 37.1% of the local votes went to Adolf Hitler’s party (as against the national average of 2.6%) while only 1.8% went to the Communists (as against the national average of 10.6%). By the time of the 1933 Reichstag elections, after Hitler had already seized power, local support for the Nazis had shrunk to 23.0% while the Communists’ share of the vote had risen greatly to 22.1%. The Nazis nevertheless prevailed in the end, and Hitler's success in these elections paved the way for his Enabling Act of 1933 (Ermächtigungsgesetz), thus starting the Third Reich in earnest. Among other things, Hitler banned the Communist Party of Germany.

Only after the Second World War was there another territorial reorganization. The Palatinate was now grouped into the then newly founded state of Rhineland-Palatinate. The Bürgermeisterei of Neunkirchen, though, remained in force until the 1968 administrative restructuring in Rhineland-Palatinate. After its dissolution, Föckelberg became an Ortsgemeinde within the Verbandsgemeinde of Altenglan.

=== Population development ===
Originally it was first and foremost farmers and forestry workers who lived in Föckelberg, and for a while also miners who worked the Potzberg's quicksilver mines. Only for the time since the late 18th century are population figures available. These show that in a span of less than 50 years (1788 to 1825), the population grew more than twofold. This growth arose not only from natural growth, but also from a change in economic conditions, namely the expansion of mercury mining on the Potzberg. This mining expansion might partly explain the peak in Föckelberg's population of 444 in 1905, although by that time, most of the mines on the mountain had been shut down. This, of course, led to shrinking population figures right up until the years following the Second World War. The newer rise in population since 1960 can be ascribed to the village's relatively favourable location near the centres of Kusel and Kaiserslautern. Nevertheless, a stagnation in population growth may now be noted. Over time, the original commercial relationships have changed utterly. There are nowadays only a few agricultural operations still in business in Föckelberg, and all are worked as secondary occupations, and this has even brought about a turnover in population, with long established families’ younger members moving away and new families moving into Föckelberg. Most members of the workforce must seek work elsewhere, such as in towns like Kaiserslautern and Kusel.

The following table shows population development over the centuries for Föckelberg:

Year	1788	1825	1835	1871	1905	1939	1950	1961	1970	1978	1988	2003
Total	176	373	433	417	444	379	375	401	430	406	426	396

=== Municipality’s name ===
In 1397, Föckelberg had its first documentary mention as Fockelnberg. Other names that the village has borne over time are Feckelnberg (1460), Fuckelnberg (1483) and Feckelburg (1571). The name used today first showed up in 1788 in Goswin Widder's writings and became current in the 19th century. According to researchers Dolch and Greule, the name means “Fockilo’s settlement” or “Fockilo’s field”, making no apparent reference to the placename ending —berg, which means “mountain” in German.

=== Vanished villages ===
No vanished villages are known to have lain within Föckelberg's current limits, but Goswin Widder, writing in 1788, mentioned a Wüsthube (roughly, a hide of land where a village once stood), but he did not elaborate.

== Religion ==
From the village's founding, the villagers of Föckelberg belonged to a parish whose seat was Neunkirchen am Potzberg. Sometime before the 14th century, this parish of the “new church” (neue Kirche in modern German, the same roots having given rise to the name “Neunkirchen”) was made partly subject to the parish of Deinsberg (Theisbergstegen). With the permanent introduction of the Reformation into the County Palatine of Zweibrücken about 1537, all subjects had to adopt Martin Luther’s teachings as their faith, and this included everybody in Föckelberg. Unlike what later happened in Palatinate-Zweibrücken, there was no further conversion to Calvinism in the County Palatine of Veldenz-Lützelstein, to which Föckelberg belonged as of 1543. Thus, for the time being, all the villagers clung to Lutheranism. From this time comes a story that tells of how the pastor always rode in a calèche from Theisbergstegen to a certain oaktree in the Föckelberger Wald (forest), when he wanted to hold church services in Bosenbach. The people of Bosenbach would likewise come to this tree, the Kalescheiche (“Calèche Oak”), to pick the pastor up there. This oaktree was felled during the Second World War because it had become dangerous owing to the ravages of age.

Mostly by migration, Calvinists began to become bit by bit more numerous in the Potzberg area, and therefore, their Reformed faith based on John Calvin’s teachings became more widespread. Calvin’s followers stood in stark contrast to the Lutherans. Like them, the Calvinists were tied to a mother church in Neunkirchen. With the 1819 Protestant Union, these two denominations were merged. With the outbreak of King Louis XIV’s wars of conquest, Catholicism, too, was once again being promoted. Today, the population is mostly Evangelical, but as early as 1825, one third of the population was once again Catholic. This ratio is little changed today. Föckelberg’s Protestants, like the ones in Niederstaufenbach, belong to the parish of Neunkirchen and the deaconry of Kusel, while the Catholics belong to the parish of Reichenbach.

== Politics ==
=== Municipal council ===
The council is made up of 8 council members, who were elected by majority vote at the municipal election held on 7 June 2009, and the honorary mayor as chairman.

=== Mayor ===
Föckelberg’s mayor is Frank Winter, and his deputies are Gunter Liesenfeld and Klaus Klein.

=== Coat of arms ===
The municipality’s arms might be described thus: Per pale Or in base a mount of three issuant from which the Potzbergturm vert and sable a lion rampant of the first armed, langued and crowned gules.

The charge on the dexter (armsbearer’s right, viewer’s left) side is the Potzbergturm, a lookout tower that stands on top of the Potzberg and serves as a prominent local landmark. The “mount of three” (called a Dreiberg in German heraldry), the three-knolled hill from which the tower emerges, represents this mountain, and is also canting for the last syllable in the village's name, —berg, which means “mountain” in German (curiously, one source describes this charge as a “treetop”). The lion on the sinister (armsbearer's left, viewer's right) side stands for Electoral Palatinate, which exercised authority in Föckelberg under the Old Empire. On the other hand, it is the Wittelsbach lion, and not only Electoral Palatinate but also Palatinate-Zweibrücken and Palatinate-Veldenz, to both of which Föckelberg belonged after 1444, were Wittelsbach domains. The arms have been borne since 1975 when they were approved by the now defunct Rheinhessen-Pfalz Regierungsbezirk administration in Neustadt an der Weinstraße.

== Culture and sightseeing ==
=== Buildings ===
The following are listed buildings or sites in Rhineland-Palatinate’s Directory of Cultural Monuments:

- At Brunnenstraße 3 – stone oven pedestal, marked 1771, oven slab, marked 1720
- At Eckstraße 9 – oven slab, marked 1720, stone oven pedestal
- At Hofgartenstraße 1 – stone oven pedestal, marked 1802

=== Regular events ===
Föckelberg holds its kermis (church consecration festival) on the fourth weekend in July. There are no longer any particularly old customs observed in the village.

=== Clubs ===
For a relatively small village, Föckelberg has several clubs worth mentioning:

- Sport club
- Singing club
- Countrywomen’s club
- Fruitgrowing and gardening club

== Economy and infrastructure ==
=== Economic structure ===
Originally, Föckelberg was a purely agricultural village. With the opening of the quicksilver mines in the Potzberg area, workers’ families also settled here. In 1930, some 37% of the population worked at agriculture for their primary source of income. From statistics published in 1970 by the Verbandsgemeinde it can be noted that even then, 60% of the population were still somehow tied to agriculture. By then, though, the number of agricultural operations being worked as primary income sources had shrunk greatly, and working the land as a secondary occupation had become the norm. The decline of farming in Föckelberg has since progressed, and so most people seeking a livelihood nowadays must commute to jobs outside the village, mainly to the region around Kusel and to Kaiserslautern. Also of undoubted importance is tourism, mainly in connection with the Potzberg's summit with its mountain hotel, its lookout tower and its animal park.

=== Education ===
About schooling in Föckelberg little is known. It is likely, though, that there was a winter school (a school geared towards an agricultural community's practical needs, held in the winter, when farm families had a bit more time to spare) in the village as early as the 18th century. Regular year-round schooling was introduced only in the 19th century. In 1897, the village got a schoolhouse that for the local circumstances at that time was big. It was also built to a striking architectural design. In this building, all schoolchildren were taught in one room. After the Hauptschule students began attending classes in Altenglan in 1968, two primary school classes at first remained in Föckelberg, forming together with two other classes in Neunkirchen am Potzberg a single-stream primary school system. Since then, these two classes have been dissolved, and the schoolhouse has been converted into a village community centre. Primary school pupils nowadays attend classes in nearby Neunkirchen, while Hauptschule students attend the Regionale Schule in Altenglan. Higher schools (Realschule, Gymnasium and vocational schools) can be found in Kusel.

=== Transport ===
Föckelberg lies on Kreisstraße (District Road) 34 (locally known as Hauptstraße), which leads from Altenglan to Neunkirchen am Potzberg and Landesstraße 364. Another Kreisstraße, number 35, branches off from Kreisstraße 34 in Föckelberg's north end and leads up to the Potzberg's summit. It is some 10 km to both the nearest Autobahn interchanges, the one at Kusel and the one at Glan-Münchweiler, on the A 62 (Kaiserslautern–Trier), which runs to the southwest. The one at Kaiserslautern West (Vogelweh) lies 32 km away.

Serving nearby Altenglan is Altenglan station, about 6 km away, on the Landstuhl–Kusel railway. There are hourly trains at this station throughout the day, namely Regionalbahn service RB 67 between Kaiserslautern and Kusel, named Glantalbahn after a former railway line that shared a stretch of its tracks with the Landstuhl–Kusel railway.

== Famous people ==
=== Sons and daughters of the town ===
Alois Kraemer (b. 1899 in Föckelberg; d. 1983 in Landau) – jurist, “state scientist” and politician; editor at newspapers that were suppressed during the time of the Third Reich for political reasons, printing shop (which was likewise shut down) owner; after the Second World War, as member of the CDU, deputy mayor (Bürgermeister) and later chief mayor (Oberbürgermeister) of Landau, honorary citizen of the town and bearer of the Order of Merit of the Federal Republic of Germany (Grand Cross).
