= Oberstaufenbach =

- Municipality
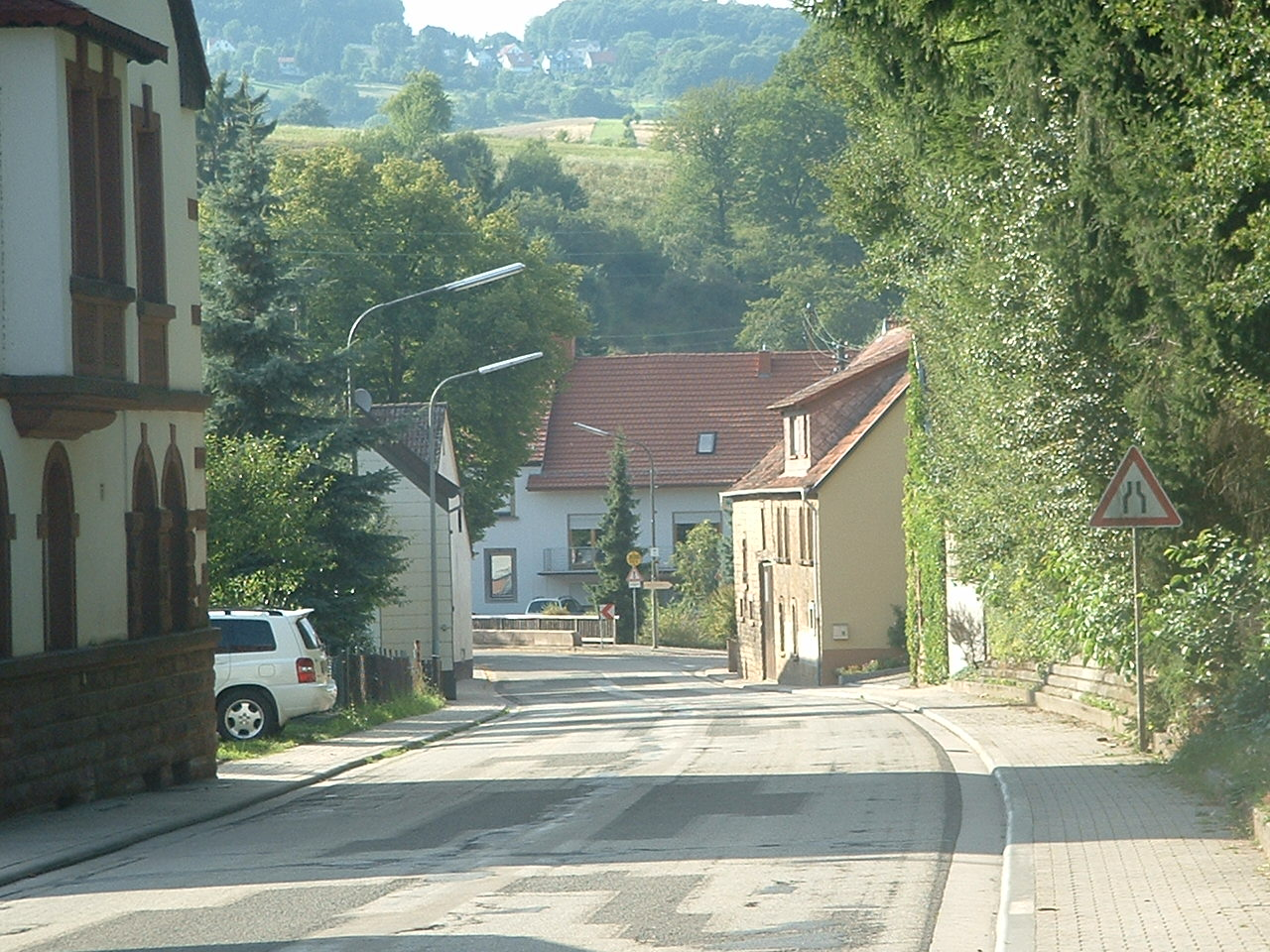

- Coat of arms

- Location of Oberstaufenbach within Kusel district
- Interactive map of Oberstaufenbach
- Location within Germany Location within Rhineland-Palatinate
- Coordinates: 49°30′53.25″N 7°30′33.34″E
- Country: Germany
- State: Rhineland-Palatinate
- District: Kusel
- Municipal assoc.: Kusel-Altenglan

Government
  - Mayor (2019–24): Thomas Andes

Area
  - Total: 2.68 km^{2} (1.03 sq mi)
- Elevation: 254 m (833 ft)

Population (2025-12-31)
  - Total: 262
  - Density: 97.8/km^{2} (253/sq mi)
- Time zone: UTC+01:00 (CET)
  - Summer (DST): UTC+02:00 (CEST)
- Postal codes: 66879
- Dialling codes: 06385
- Vehicle registration: KUS
- Website: altenglan.de

Oberstaufenbach is an Ortsgemeinde – a municipality belonging to a Verbandsgemeinde, a kind of collective municipality – in the Kusel district in Rhineland-Palatinate, Germany. It belongs to the Verbandsgemeinde of Kusel-Altenglan, whose seat is in Kusel.

== Geography ==
=== Location ===
Oberstaufenbach lies between Kaiserslautern and Kusel on Landesstraße (State Road) 367 in the valley of the Reichenbach, a tributary to the river Glan, and at the foot of the Potzberg in the North Palatine Uplands on the river's left bank and at the foot of the Heidenburg (today a quarry) on the river's right bank. Culturally and historically, it lies in the middle of the Kusel Musikantenland ("Minstrels' Land"). The land within municipal limits exhibits a variable topography, with heights ranging from 240 to 400 m above sea level. The village's elevation is 254 m above sea level. With reference to slope, the lands within Oberstaufenbach might be described as being 10% even, 25% leaning, 45% sloped and 20% steep. The village originally arose in the dale. The municipal area measures 268 ha, of which about 37 ha is wooded and 211 ha is under agricultural use (170 ha cropland and 40 ha meadowland).

=== Neighbouring municipalities ===
Oberstaufenbach borders in the north on the municipality of Niederstaufenbach, in the southeast on the municipality of Reichenbach-Steegen, in the west on the municipality of Neunkirchen am Potzberg and in the northwest on the municipality of Föckelberg.

=== Constituent communities ===
Also belonging to Oberstaufenbach is the outlying homestead of Birkenhof, which was built in 1965 as an Aussiedlerhof, an agricultural settlement whose goal was to enhance food production. There is also the Oberstaufenbacher Mühle (mill).

=== Municipality’s layout ===
Oberstaufenbach can be considered a clump village with loosely scattered houses. The original settlement grew on the Reichenbach's left bank and on both sides of the Limbach. Only with the building of the road in the Reichenbach valley did residential development arise here, along the road, both towards Reichenbach and towards Niederstaufenbach. Also built were houses along former farm lanes. Over the last two decades, the slopes near the village have also been opened to extensive building development. Worthy of note is an armorial stone found on the gable at the family Grill's house. It came about 1871/1872 as a keystone from a gateway arch to Oberstaufenbach. In Weilerbach, the house's builder had acquired bits of the former Schellenberger Hof, among other things the stones from the gateway arch, when that estate was torn down. He brought them to Oberstaufenbach, thinking to use them in his own building work. He set the keystone, which bears the von Horn coat of arms, in the walling in his house's gable. As early as 1855, the municipality of Oberstaufenbach laid out its own graveyard on the way out of the village going towards Neunkirchen am Potzberg, and not many years ago, it also had a mortuary built there. The former Heidenburg (literally “heathen castle”) is described in literature time and again as a Römerkastell (“Roman fort”). Only in the 1994 publication Oberstaufenbach im Wandel der Zeit (“Oberstaufenbach Through the Ages”) can a systematic reappraisal of this storied knoll be found. The writer came to the following conclusion: The knoll was fortified from early to middle La Tène times. In Roman times, nothing more than grave monuments and godstones were set up there. Reports of archaeological finds during the 19th century mention almost nothing but carved images, and conspicuous by their almost utter absence are reports of any finds of coins. Thus, any notion that a Roman fort once stood upon the knoll must be thoroughly revised. In the 10th century, there may well have been a wooden chapel standing there, and it seems likely that in the centuries that followed, this would have been replaced with a stone building. At the same time, work on a tower castle began. No later than the 12th century, this castle was provided with a girding wall and a well shaft. Nevertheless, the castle was forsaken before the Middle Ages had even ended, and hence, a written mention of it is nowhere to be found. In the 19th century, the knoll became the location for something else, a hard-stone quarry. The work there removed any remnant of the old castle that had lain there for centuries. Also unearthed at the site were pieces of Roman grave monuments, which might themselves have been used later to build the castle. In bygone centuries, the municipal area was a tangle of crisscrossing property lines, with often very small fields. In 1976, however, Flurbereinigung was undertaken, forming contiguous blocks of farmland, some quite big.

== History ==
=== Antiquity ===
Partial settlement, even before Roman times, can be confirmed by archaeological finds on the Heidenburg from La Tène times. What can also be established is that there were settlers here in Roman times. Remnants left by them were being unearthed on the Heidenburg up until the late 19th century. Despite the common assumption that there was a Roman fortification on this hilltop, there was actually only a Roman graveyard.

=== Middle Ages ===
In the village of Oberhausen (see Vanished villages below), people may once again have settled within what are now Oberstaufenbach's limits as early as the 8th century. Sometime in the Early Middle Ages, a castle complex was built, in which the available Roman grave monuments would have been used. This castle was not used for very long, though, and any trace of it was finally destroyed by stone quarrying in the 19th and 20th centuries. In 1393, Oberstaufenbach had its first documentary mention in a document of bestowal from Count Friedrich of Veldenz. Professor Ernst Christmann, however, was of the opinion that there were already settlers in what is now Oberstaufenbach by 900, for Emperor Otto I in 945 granted a liegeman six Königshufen (an area of land) that lay between Bosenbach and Reichenbach, that is to say, within what are now Oberstaufenbach's and Niederstaufenbach's limits. Whatever the facts were, Oberstaufenbach was not mentioned by name in this document. Count Friedrich's 1393 document, however, in which he granted his wife Margareta von Nassau villages belonging to the Ämter of Reichenbach and Theisbergstegen, lists Oberstaufenbach by name, along with all the other villages that he gave his wife. About the turn of the second millennium, the village belonged to the Imperial Domain (Reichsland) near Kaiserslautern. Back then, Oberstaufenbach was considered part of the Amt of Deinsberg (Theißberg) am Glan, where the parochial seat could also be found. This Amt ended up by pledge in the ownership of the Counts of Veldenz and passed in 1444 to Louis I, Count Palatine of Zweibrücken, as rightful heir to the County of Veldenz.

=== Modern times ===
In 1543, the Amt area, now described as the Jettenbacher Gericht (“court”), was grouped into the then newly formed Principality of Veldenz-Lauterecken. Also belonging to this until 1697 was Oberstaufenbach. It was then that Electoral Palatinate troops occupied the former Veldenz Ämter of Lauterecken and Reichenbach to lend weight to the Electorate's inheritance claims. In the end, the Amt of Reichenbach remained with Electoral Palatinate as of 1733.

==== Recent times ====
During the time of the French Revolution and the Napoleonic era that followed, the German lands on the Rhine’s left bank were annexed by France. Oberstaufenbach now belonged to the Mairie (“Mayoralty”) of Bosenbach, the Canton of Wolfstein, the Arrondissement of Kaiserslautern and the Department of Mont-Tonnerre (or Donnersberg in German). After the French were driven out in 1814, the Congress of Vienna established a new political order in post-Napoleonic Europe. In 1816, after a transitional time, Oberstaufenbach was grouped into the bayerischer Rheinkreis, later known as Rheinpfalz (“Rhenish Palatinate”), an exclave of the Kingdom of Bavaria. More locally, Oberstaufenbach was grouped into the Bürgermeisterei (“Mayoralty”) of Neunkirchen, the Canton of Wolfstein and the Landkommissariat of Kusel. After the Second World War, Oberstaufenbach found itself in the then newly founded state of Rhineland-Palatinate. Until the formation of the Verbandsgemeinden in 1972, Oberstaufenbach was assigned to the Bürgermeisterei (“Mayoralty”) of Neunkirchen am Potzberg. Upon formation of the Verbandsgemeinden, Oberstaufenbach found itself in the Verbandsgemeinde of Altenglan in the Kusel district. Only in 1975 did the municipality finally decide to undertake Flurbereinigung after eight landowners put forth a proposal that led to approval by municipal council on 16 October of that year. The municipality received a subsidy covering 87% of the cost of rearranging properties, which resulted in, among other things, the utter obliteration of the old network of paths and the laying out of a whole new one. Roughly 5 km of farm lanes were paved with blacktop and a footpath and cycle path was built from Oberstaufenbach to Niederstaufenbach. Further, the new building area “Hahnwege” was surveyed and subdivided; part of the existing village was also surveyed.

=== The Heidenburg ===
Since the 19th century, the Heidenburg (literally “heathen castle”) has been known as Römerkastell (“Roman fort”). Beginning about 1855, this melaphyr-bearing land was a stone quarry where paving stones were made. These were sold as far away as France. Beginning in 1862, the municipally owned land was let to various tenants. The considerable income from rent led to the municipality being rather well off. Only in 1885 were archaeological investigations begun and a survey of the remaining ruins undertaken. By this time, a good three fourths of the complex had fallen victim to quarrying. The quarrymen's statements allowed investigators to reconstruct the ringwall's alignment at least. According to these, the Heidenburg had once had an oval fortification with an almost straight south wall. The ringwall had a breadth of 1.50 to 1.80 m and enclosed an area about 100 m long and 69 m wide. Buildings still stood, but only in the southern part of the complex that had still been preserved in 1855. A well 90 cm in diameter could be traced to a depth of 40 m, but the bottom could not be reached. On the southeastern side, two nearly complete buildings were observed, but of a third only one wall remained. The use of mortar in the masonry and the lack of any clearly Roman materials give rise to doubts about the complex dating from Roman times. Rather, it would seem, going by archaeological finds, to be a castle complex from the High Middle Ages, the 11th and 12th centuries, but whatever nobles owned it is quite unknown.

=== Population development ===
Oberstaufenbach was originally inhabited only by farmers, but bit by bit, many villagers also sought livelihoods in quarries and mines. Today the village is a residential community for people of the most varied of occupations, who for the most part are commuting to jobs outside the village. In the future, the village will gain importance for recreation seekers and tourism. During the 19th century, population figures kept rising steadily, if not very quickly, even though emigration was taking place. A drop in the earlier half of the 20th century can be explained by emigration and migrations to other parts of Germany. In the latter half of the 20th century, there was for a short while considerable growth in population figures fostered by the village's favourable location near both Kusel and Kaiserslautern. This development, though, does not seem to be continuing.

The following table shows population development over the centuries for Oberstaufenbach, with some figures broken down by religious denomination:

Year	1787	1825	1835	1871	1905	1939	1961	2003	2007	20011	2019
Total	91	188	195	202	216	183	206	293	246	247	278
Catholic		36					35			67
Evangelical		152					171			138
Others										41

=== Municipality’s name ===
The name “Oberstaufenbach” ends in the syllable —bach (German for “brook”), as do many other placenames in the region. Prefixed to this is the syllable stauf—, from the Middle High German word Stouf, defined as “towering rock, comparable to an upended beaker without a bottom”. Historical forms of the name are, among others, Stauffenbach (1377), ober Stauffenbach (1393), Stauffenbach (1430), Oberstauffenbach (1567), Ober Stauffenbach (1593) and Oberstaufenbach (1824). The name is drawn from the former melaphyre deposit north of the village, which has now been quarried away. This towering mountain knoll was described as a Stouf in earlier times, giving the village part of its name. The brook that flows by here may well have been called the Staufenbach at that time, and hence the name means a brook that flows between stones and cliffs. Over the ages, however, the name Reichenbach came to be applied to the whole brook, a name drawn from the neighbouring village of Reichenbach. The prefix Ober— means “upper”, and now distinguishes Oberstaufenbach from nearby Niederstaufenbach.

=== Vanished villages ===
Oberhausen, a village that arose in the 8th century, might have lain where now the road leaves Oberstaufenbach on the way to Reichenbach. There are still a few rural cadastral names just there that commemorate the old village.

== Religion ==
In the Middle Ages, Oberstaufenbach belonged to the parish of Deinsberg (Theisberg). After a chapel was built in Neunkirchen am Potzberg, villagers attended services there. The pastor from Deinsberg had to hold these services. After the Reformation, a chaplain, who at least temporarily lived in Neunkirchen, was responsible for the chapel. In the latter half of the 16th century, the parish of Neunkirchen was tended by the Lutheran pastor in Bosenbach. When in 1588 John I, Count Palatine of Zweibrücken completed the changeover to the Reformed faith, the Neunkirchen congregation, which was a Veldenz holding, had to hire their own pastor. Indeed, in the Veldenz Amt of Reichenbach, the inhabitants remained Lutheran throughout the time from the Reformation to the Union of the two Protestant denominations in the early 19th century. Only in 1746 was a Reformed parish established at Neunkirchen to serve the few Calvinists in the Amt of Reichenbach. In 1825, the Protestant share of Oberstaufenbach's population was some 80%. Today, they are still parochially united with Neunkirchen. Oberstaufenbach's few Catholics have been attending services in Reichenbach ever since a new Catholic parish was established there. This arrangement has stood to this day. Besides a chapel that might once have stood in the area of the mediaeval castle complex, there has never been a church in Oberstaufenbach itself. However, in 2000, the game tenant Kolb had a chapel built in Oberstaufenbach, consecrated to Saint Hubert. Disagreements with the building authorities resulted in a partial dismantling of this chapel, which stands on the village's outskirts.

== Politics ==
=== Municipal council ===
The council is made up of 6 council members, who were elected by majority vote at the municipal election held on 7 June 2009, and the honorary mayor as chairman.

=== Mayor ===
Oberstaufenbach's mayor is Thomas Andes.

=== Coat of arms ===
The German blazon reads: Unter silbernem Schildhaupt, darin ein blauer Wellenbalken, in schwarz ein rotbewehrter, -bezungter und -bekrönter goldener Löwe vor einem aus dem rechten Schildrand hervorkommenden goldenen Stufenfelsen.

The municipality's arms might in English heraldic language be described thus: Sable issuant from base and dexter crags Or and to sinister a lion rampant of the same armed, langued and crowned gules, on a chief argent a fess wavy azure.

Oberstaufenbach's arms bear the same charges in the same composition as Niederstaufenbach's. The only heraldic difference lies in the tinctures. Those in the main field are the ones formerly borne by the Duchy of Palatine Zweibrücken in its arms, while the tinctures on the chief are the ones formerly borne by the Counts of Veldenz in their arms. Both these states were once lords. The lion is a reference to the village's former allegiance to Electoral Palatinate. The crags and the wavy fess on the chief are canting charges for the municipality's name, Stauf being an archaic word for “crag” in German (the usual word is Fels or Felsen), and the wavy fess standing for a brook, or in German, Bach.

== Culture and sightseeing ==
=== Buildings ===
The following are listed buildings or sites in Rhineland-Palatinate’s Directory of Cultural Monuments:

- At Hauptstraße 5 – armorial stone of the Barons of Horn
- At Hohlstraße 2 – elaborate post-Baroque sandstone portal, about 1800
- Hohlstraße 4 – corner estate, essentially from the late 18th century; timber-frame building plastered, partly solid, expansion 1828, conversion of commercial building 1853
- Hohlstraße 6 – three-sided estate, 1823; Quereinhaus (a combination residential and commercial house divided for these two purposes down the middle, perpendicularly to the street), expansion after 1845
- Mühlwaldstraße 2, former mill (monumental zone) – group of houses consisting of house with mill wing, 1791, two commercial buildings, 19th century; Roman spolia

=== Natural monuments ===
Oberstaufenbach has two notable natural monuments, both of them limetrees planted in 1896. If one goes through the village towards Reichenbach, one first comes to the Bismarcklinde, which was planted in the former Imperial President’s honour (he had been dismissed from office six years earlier by Kaiser Wilhelm II). On the other side of the bridge stands the Luitpoldlinde, which was planted in Bavarian Prince Regent Luitpold’s honour (the Palatinate was a Bavarian exclave at the time).

=== Regular events ===
The local customs are the ones that are generally found in the Westrich, an historic region that encompasses areas in both Germany and France. The kermis (church consecration festival, locally known as the Kerwe) is held on the third weekend in September.

=== Clubs ===
About 1900, Oberstaufenbach had a Waffenbrüderverein (“brothers in arms club”), a singing club and a pig husbandry club. As of 2005, there are a Heidenburgverein (dedicated to the castle), a Stammtisch and a women's choir.

== Economy and infrastructure ==
=== Economic structure ===
In the 19th century Oberstaufenbach had a few major homesteads belonging to wealthy farmers. They kept the Glan-Donnersberg breed of cattle, typical of this part of the country. Quite early on – before 1900 – a threshing cooperative arose in Oberstaufenbach, one that maintained a threshing machine with a traction engine. At the knoll at the top of the do-called Heidenburg, work began at a hard-stone quarry. Paving stones were mainly what was made there. The knoll was repeatedly, but with interruptions, let to various parties. The quarry was finally given up about 1960. The Oberstaufenbacher Mühle (mill) with its overshot waterwheel may well have been built in the 16th century. It had its first documentary mention in 1571. The mill was in Erbbestand (a uniquely German landhold arrangement in which ownership rights and usage rights were separated; this is forbidden by law in modern Germany) and belonged to the Duke of Palatine Zweibrücken. In 1600, it passed to the Veldenz comital line at Lauterecken. It had to be built all over again after the Thirty Years' War, but that was done quite quickly. In the 18th century, the mill had both gristmilling and husking functions. In the late 18th century, it had two waterwheels, although the two were seldom run at once, for the water availability was usually low. The mill was shut down for good after the Second World War. Worthy of note for being among the village's few craft businesses are the family Engel's smithy and locksmith’s shop. Over many generations, the family Engel ran a farrier’s and wainwright’s shop. Today, farm equipment is repaired here and locksmith's products are made.

=== Education ===
In 1845, Oberstaufenbach had a one-room schoolhouse that had been built as early as 1824. About 1960, the village had a one-class Protestant denominational school. Today, primary school pupils attend classes at the primary school in Neunkirchen am Potzberg, while Hauptschule students attend the Regionale Schule in Altenglan.

=== Transport ===
Oberstaufenbach lies on Landesstraße 367, which links Altenglan with Kaiserslautern. In the village itself, Landesstraße 364 branches off Landesstraße 367. This leads by the Potzberg's peak and links Oberstaufenbach with the Glan near Gimsbach, an outlying centre of Matzenbach. Fourteen kilometres to the southwest runs the Autobahn A 62 (Kaiserslautern–Trier) with its Glan-Münchweiler and Konken interchanges, each some 10 km away. Also lying roughly 10 km away is the Kaiserslautern West interchange on the Autobahn A 6 (Saarbrücken–Mannheim). Serving Theisbergstegen is a railway station on the Landstuhl–Kusel railway, which is served by Regionalbahn service RB 67, called the Glantalbahn (the name of which refers to the Glan Valley Railway, which shared some of the route of the Landstuhl–Kusel line, including at Theisbergstegen).

=== Recent developments ===
Oberstaufenbach was once characterized by agriculture, but has undergone a shift to a residential community. The village's geographical location puts it in a thinly settled and economically weak region. Roughly 90% of the population is made up of commuters, earning their livelihoods mainly in the Kaiserslautern area. In 1975, the municipality's then population figure of 164 was nearly doubled by the opening of several new building areas. Roughly 120 Americans live in Oberstaufenbach, these being NATO personnel and their families. The village lies a mere 15 km from Ramstein Air Base, and these personnel make up twenty-five percent of Oberstaufenbach's population.

== People ==
=== Sons and daughters of the town ===
- Daniel Kuntz (b. 1860; d. 1959 in Boston), musician

He was born here on 19 April 1860 and was one of the Wandermusikanten, travelling musicians who went around the world to earn their livelihood at their craft between 1861 and 1922. He later had musical training in the United States. Kuntz was one of the Boston Symphony Orchestra’s founding members, and he remained a member for 33 years. He enjoyed worldwide fame, bearing witness to which was his engagement at the age of 31 as a violin soloist at Bayreuth’s Festspielhaus. Daniel Kuntz died in Boston at the age of 99. He was the last surviving musician from the Boston Symphony Orchestra's founding season.
