= Matzenbach =

- Municipality
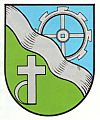
- Coat of arms

- Location of Matzenbach within Kusel district
- Interactive map of Matzenbach
- Location within Germany Location within Rhineland-Palatinate
- Coordinates: 49°29′44″N 7°27′38″E
- Country: Germany
- State: Rhineland-Palatinate
- District: Kusel
- Municipal assoc.: Oberes Glantal
- Subdivisions: 3

Government
  - Mayor (2020–24): Andrea Müller

Area
  - Total: 7.04 km^{2} (2.72 sq mi)
- Elevation: 210 m (690 ft)

Population (2025-12-31)
  - Total: 590
  - Density: 84/km^{2} (220/sq mi)
- Time zone: UTC+01:00 (CET)
  - Summer (DST): UTC+02:00 (CEST)
- Postal codes: 66909
- Dialling codes: 06383
- Vehicle registration: KUS
- Website: www.matzenbach.de

Matzenbach is an Ortsgemeinde – a municipality belonging to a Verbandsgemeinde, a kind of collective municipality – in the Kusel district in Rhineland-Palatinate, Germany. It belongs to the Verbandsgemeinde of Oberes Glantal.

== Geography ==
=== Location ===
The municipality lies on the river Glan in the Western Palatinate. Rising above the village to the northeast is the Potzberg (562 m above sea level). The municipal area measures 705 ha, of which 202 ha is wooded.

==== Matzenbach (main centre) ====
Matzenbach lies at the mouth of the Straubenbach where it empties into the Glan, on the river's right bank across from the neighbouring Ortsteil of Eisenbach at an elevation of 210 m above sea level. To the north lies the Ortsteil of Gimsbach. From the Glan valley outwards, the mountain slopes climb steeply to an elevation of 330 m above sea level. The Straubengrunderhof lies east of Matzenbach and the Langenbacherhof south (see Constituent communities below).

==== Eisenbach ====
While the Ortsteil of Matzenbach spreads out on the Glan's right bank, Eisenbach lies across the river on the left bank. Both centres are linked by a bridge. The rather busy Bundesstraße 423, too, runs along the right bank, so that Eisenbach on the other side of the river is spared any great volume of traffic. On the other hand, Eisenbach lies on the railway line, which is served by hourly trains running between Kusel and Landstuhl. Matzenbach is linked by simple Kreisstraßen to the neighbouring village to the south, Rehweiler, and to Godelhausen to the north, an outlying centre of Theisbergstegen. Eisenbach itself borders on each of these on the Glan's left bank.

==== Gimsbach ====
Gimsbach lies south of the Potzberg at the mouth of the Günsbach (or Gimsbach) where it empties into the Glan at an elevation of some 108 m above sea level. Towards the north, the land climbs steeply up to the Potzberg, and below the Potzberg's peak reaches the highest elevation within Matzenbach's municipal limits at 490 m above sea level. In the west, the municipal area is bordered by the Glan, while in the south is the former municipal limit with the Ortsteil of Matzenbach, now lo longer operative since the amalgamation.

=== Neighbouring municipalities ===
Matzenbach borders in the north on the municipality of Theisbergstegen, in the northeast on the municipality of Neunkirchen am Potzberg, in the east on the municipality of Reichenbach-Steegen (outlying centre of Fockenberg-Limbach in the Kaiserslautern district), in the southeast on the municipality of Niedermohr (outlying centre of Reuschbach, also in the Kaiserslautern district) and in the southwest on the municipality of Rehweiler.

=== Constituent communities ===
Matzenbach's Ortsteile are Matzenbach (main centre), Eisenbach am Glan and Gimsbach. Under many headings in this article, each of these three centres will be given its own subsection. Also belonging to Matzenbach are the outlying homesteads of Auhof, Hollerhof, Langenbacherhof, Schreckmühle, Straubengrunderhof and Wellesbacherhof.

=== Municipality’s layout ===
==== Matzenbach (main centre) ====
The Ortsteil of Matzenbach presents itself as a small clump village in the area of the Straubenbach's mouth with rather sparse building on the through road along the Glan (Moorstraße), with heavier building on the streets that branch off it, Eisenbacher Straße to the west and Fockenberger Straße and Reuchenbacher Straße to the east. The building style makes it clear that Matzenbach was in earlier days purely a farming village. Buildings that stand out are the former schoolhouse on Eisenbacher-Straße near the Glan, the stately mill building on the way out of the village going towards Rehweiler and a few typical West Palatine farmhouses, some of which have over the years been remodelled. New building zones have arisen “an der Warth” (this prepositional phrase is a street's name; such name formulations are quite common in Germany; cf Unter den Linden) in the village's north end and on Fockenberger Straße. The old washing steps are still preserved on the bank of the Glan.

==== Eisenbach ====
Eisenbach stretches mainly along a single street alongside the railway and the river Glan beginning at the bridge that links it with Matzenbach. Only a few houses stand south of the bridge, among them the former Eisenbach-Matzenbach railway station, now the Matzenbach halt. Here, too, the building style makes it clear that this was in earlier days purely a farming village. As is mostly customary in the West Palatinate, the houses stand with their long sides towards the street. Many have remained in their original condition.

==== Gimsbach ====
Gimsbach's built-up area stretches along both sides of the through road (Bundesstraße 423), which within the village is known as Glanstraße and which runs parallel to the river Glan, then along both sides of Neunkircher Straße, which branches off the main road and runs along the Günsbach. On the brook's south side, Römerstraße branches off Glanstraße affording access to an extensive new building zone. The building style in the older parts of the village makes it clear that it was mainly farmers who lived here in earlier times. Nowadays, many of these farmhouses have been remodelled and are also used quite often for tourism. Standing out among the older buildings is the Protestant church built in 1747, which dominates the view from the northern Glan valley. Before the church, towards the street, stands the former schoolhouse. Worth mentioning as a good example of the former farmhouse typical of the Westrich, an historic region that encompasses areas in both Germany and France, is the Haus Maas-Schleppi on Glanstraße, although even this has deviated considerably from the original type as a result of later conversions. Somewhat outside the village on Neunkircher Straße stands the former Schreckmühle (mill). On the slope south of the Günsbach lie a few Aussiedlerhöfe (post-war farming settlements established to enhance the food supply). The former village pond has now become a “solar bath”.

== History ==
On 7 June 1969, the municipality of Eisenbach-Matzenbach was newly formed out of the former municipalities of Eisenbach and Matzenbach. Today's Ortsgemeinde of Matzenbach came into being on 20 March 1971 through the merger of this municipality with the municipality of Gimsbach.

=== Antiquity ===
==== Matzenbach (main centre) ====
The area around Matzenbach was settled by people in prehistoric times and also in Gallo-Roman times, bearing witness to which are the extensive archaeological finds right near the village and also farther afield. Particularly worthy of mention are the rich Gallo-Roman finds at the Potzberg near Mühlbach and within neighbouring Gimsbach's limits (see below), and also finds unearthed near Glan-Münchweiler. There are, however, no reports of any archaeological finds within Matzenbach's limits.

==== Eisenbach ====
The area around Eisenbach was settled beginning in the New Stone Age, as witnessed by many finds from the surrounding villages. It was also so in Gallo-Roman times, as shown foremost by the extensive finds from Glan-Münchweiler and the Roman settlement at Gimsbach.

==== Gimsbach ====
The area around Gimsbach was settled in prehistoric times and in Gallo-Roman times, bearing witness to which are the extensive archaeological finds right near the village and also farther afield. In Roman times, there was also a settlement right near Gimsbach. Historian Johann Goswin Widder wrote the following about this: “In the year 1765 in the field, an underground building was discovered of 16 feet in length, 12 feet in breadth and 7 feet in height, wherein various Roman remnants were found.” (Widder was using the old German measurement called a Schuh, also called a Fuß, and here translated as “foot”; German feet varied in length, but were usually about 30 cm). It is likely that he was writing about part of a Gallo-Roman villa rustica.

=== Middle Ages ===
==== Matzenbach (main centre) ====
According to the old border descriptions of the Remigiusland, the centres of Matzenbach and Gimsbach, which now lie within the municipality of Matzenbach, lay outside the Bishopric of Reims holdings in the Westrich, in the Free Imperial Domain (Reichsland), which spread out broadly around Castle Lautern (a castle in Kaiserslautern). The centre of Eisenbach, on the other hand, lay within the Reims-controlled Remigiusland, which shaped this village's history in a way unlike the other two in the municipality. The Reichsland was given as an Imperial pledge to various regional lords in the mid 14th century. Matzenbach ended up along with the other villages of the Amt of Reichenbach as an Imperial pledge in 1345 in the hands of the younger line of the Counts of Veldenz. In 1444, the County of Veldenz met its end when Count Friedrich III of Veldenz died without a male heir. His daughter Anna wed King Ruprecht's son Count Palatine Stephan. By uniting his own Palatine holdings with the now otherwise heirless County of Veldenz – his wife had inherited the county, but not her father's title – and by redeeming the hitherto pledged County of Zweibrücken, Stephan founded a new County Palatine, as whose comital residence he chose the town of Zweibrücken: the County Palatine – later Duchy – of Palatinate-Zweibrücken.

==== Eisenbach ====
The village of Eisenbach was founded long before its thus far earliest known documentary mention. It lay within the so-called Remigiusland, which had been given in the mid 12th century to the Counts of Veldenz as a Schutzvogtei (thus making the Counts “lords protector”). According to a 1200 document, Count Heinrich of Veldenz and Geroldseck declared that he was having seven solidi in the Trier currency paid yearly to the Provost of the Remigiusberg, the actual holder of the Remigiusland, for the villages of Ysenbach and Leidenstal, which he had bought from a knight from the County of Zweibrücken. Leidenstal is a now vanished village that once lay within what are now Rehweiler’s limits, while Ysenbach is an old name for Niedereisenbach. Heinrich was a count of the younger line of the Counts of Veldenz, who also by marrying the orphaned Hereditary Countess Agnes of Veldenz took over the regiment. As described above, the Veldenz line died out for lack of a male heir in 1444, and the Duchy of Palatinate-Zweibrücken was founded.

==== Gimsbach ====
Gimsbach shares Matzenbach's history as part of the Reichsland, and was also among those villages pledged in 1345 as a Vogtei to the Counts of Veldenz (see above). From late Veldenz times in 1430 – only 14 years before the comital family died out – comes a report that Burgmann Syfrit Blick von Lichtenberg bequeathed to his wife Katharina von Sötern, on the occasion of her having been given a widow's endowment of benefices from many villages, two Malter of rye and oats from Gimsbach. With the last count's death in 1444, Gimsbach, like the other two villages now in the municipality of Matzenbach, passed to the new Duchy of Palatinate-Zweibrücken.

=== Modern times ===
==== Matzenbach (main centre) ====
In 1543, Duke Wolfgang of Zweibrücken transferred lands to his uncle Ruprecht to found his own, new county palatine. Belonging to it were Veldenz on the Moselle, Lauterecken, the Ämter of Jettenbach and Reichenbach (with Matzenbach) and later also Lützelstein in Alsace. The new county palatine bore the name Palatinate-Veldenz (residence town Lauterecken), and then later Palatinate-Veldenz-Lützelstein (residence town for a time Lützelstein, now in France and known as La Petite-Pierre). The populace suffered in both the Thirty Years' War and French King Louis XIV's wars of conquest. The County Palatine of Palatinate-Veldenz-Lützelstein was dissolved in 1694 upon Count Palatine Leopold Ludwig's death, and then a dispute arose over the succession between the Duchy of Palatinate-Zweibrücken and the Electorate of the Palatinate. The dispute was settled in 1733 with the Veldenz Succession Treaty of Mannheim in Electorate of the Palatinate's favour, making Matzenbach an Electorate of the Palatinate landhold until the end of feudal times.

==== Eisenbach ====
Eisenbach shared a history with the Duchy of Palatinate-Zweibrücken until that state was swept away in the course of the French Revolution.

==== Gimsbach ====
The Amt of Reichenbach transferred along with other lands to the new County Palatine of Palatinate-Veldenz-Lützelstein in 1543 included Gimsbach as well as Matzenbach (see above), and likewise people in Gimsbach suffered through the same wars in the 17th century. With the Veldenz Succession Treaty of Mannheim, Gimsbach, too, became an Electorate of the Palatinate landhold until the end of feudal times.

==== Recent times ====
===== Matzenbach (main centre) =====
In the time of French rule that followed, Matzenbach lay in the Department of Mont-Tonnerre (or Donnersberg in German), the Canton of Landstuhl and the Arrondissement of Deux Ponts (or Zweibrücken in German). Following after that were Bavarian times, when Matzenbach at first belonged to the Landcommissariat (later Bezirksamt, and then Landkreis or district) of Homburg and the Canton of Landstuhl. As the Saarland was declared an autonomous zone after the First World War, Homburg itself and the western part of the district passed to this zone, while the eastern part was grouped partly with the Zweibrücken district. Meanwhile, the whole Canton of Landstuhl passed to the Kaiserslautern district. There were further changes in the course of administrative restructuring in Rhineland-Palatinate in 1968. Matzenbach passed along with neighbouring Gimsbach and Bettenhausen to the Kusel district, while at the same time, Matzenbach was amalgamated with the village of Eisenbach across the Glan into the municipality of Eisenbach-Matzenbach, matching the railway station’s name. Only a year later, though, a new municipality was founded, comprising not only Matzenbach and Eisenbach but Gimsbach, too, and bearing the name Matzenbach.

===== Eisenbach =====
In the time of French rule from 1801 to 1814, Eisenbach lay in the Department of Sarre, the Arrondissement of Birkenfeld, the Canton of Kusel and the Mairie (“Mayoralty”) of Quirnbach. In Bavarian times beginning in 1816, it lay in the Canton of Kusel and the Landcommissariat (later Bezirksamt, and then Landkreis or district) of Kusel. The arrangement did not change until 1968. In the early 1930s, the Nazi Party (NSDAP) became quite popular in Eisenbach. In the 1928 Reichstag elections, none of the local votes went to Adolf Hitler’s party, but by the 1930 Reichstag elections, this had grown to 31%. By the time of the 1933 Reichstag elections, after Hitler had already seized power, local support for the Nazis had swollen to 98.3%. Hitler’s success in these elections paved the way for his Enabling Act of 1933 (Ermächtigungsgesetz), thus starting the Third Reich in earnest. In the course of administrative restructuring in Rhineland-Palatinate in 1968, among all the municipal amalgamations was one that saw Eisenbach united with Matzenbach across the Glan. This new municipality of Eisenbach-Matzenbach had only been in existence for a year when Gimsbach, too, the village just north of Matzenbach, was amalgamated. The municipality now bears the name Matzenbach.

===== Gimsbach =====
Gimsbach’s territorial history in French Revolutionary, Napoleonic and Bavarian times was the same as Matzenbach’s. This village in the old French Mairie (“Mayoralty”) of Neunkirchen am Potzberg even shared its neighbour's history up to 1968. From 1816 to 1945, Gimsbach was subject to the Bezirksamt of Homburg, whereafter the then self-administering municipality was grouped into the Kaiserslautern district after the Second World War. In the course of administrative restructuring in Rhineland-Palatinate, Gimsbach passed along with its neighbours Matzenbach and Bettenhausen to the Kusel district on 7 June 1969, and then on 20 March 1971, the Ortsgemeinde of Matzenbach was founded, comprising not only Matzenbach itself, but also Eisenbach and Gimsbach.

=== Population development ===
==== Matzenbach (main centre) ====
The Electorate of the Palatinate geographer and historian Johann Goswin Widder wrote the following in 1788: “The village is currently made up of 29 families, 116 souls, 18 civic and private houses.” These 116 souls earned their livelihoods almost exclusively at agriculture. Beginning in the mid 20th century, though, more and more farmers were taking up other occupations, working the land only as a secondary source of income, or even giving it up altogether. Today, farming only plays a minor rôle in the village's life. Many workforce members commute. The village's basic structure changed. In line with this new employment pattern and by carrying out a village renewal plan, the population itself changed, too. People came from elsewhere and moved into empty houses, remodelling them. The downward population trend was thereby slowed down or even reversed.

The following table shows population development over the centuries for Matzenbach (main centre), with some figures broken down by religious denomination:

Year	1788	1825	1835	1871	1905	1939	1961
Total	161	181	171	185	155	156	162
Catholic		44					6
Protestant		137					156

==== Eisenbach ====
Eisenbach's inhabitants originally earned their livelihoods almost exclusively at agriculture. Today the village is mainly a residential community with many commuters. Population figures from the Middle Ages are not available.

The following table shows population development over the centuries for Eisenbach:

Year	1802	1835	1871	1905	1939	1961
Total	57	86	107	109	118	108

==== Gimsbach ====
The Electorate of the Palatinate geographer and historian Johann Goswin Widder wrote the following in 1788: “At the end of last year, 29 families, 111 souls, 1 church and school, 24 civic and private houses, 374 Morgen of cropland, 118 Morgen of meadows and 228 Morgen of woodland were counted here.” These 111 souls earned their livelihoods almost exclusively at agriculture, although some young men might have been employed in the mines at the Potzberg, perhaps also in the quicksilver pit at Gimsbach. Now, few people work the land for a living. Those in the workforce commute to the industrial centres, and businesses are also growing in the village itself. Particular success has been had at offering and remodelling holiday homes to expand the tourism trade. During the 19th century, the population figures rose steadily but slowly, dropping off in the earlier half of the 20th century. Worthy of note, though, is the renewed growth in population figures in the latter half of the 20th century, at a time when this was hardly the general trend in villages in the Kusel district, most of which were losing people. This can be traced back to good infrastructure and a popular residential location.

The following table shows population development over the centuries for Gimsbach, with some figures broken down by religious denomination:

Year	1778	1815	1835	1871	1905	1939	1961
Total	111	171	186	193	203	192	208
Catholic			43				38
Evangelical			128				167

=== Municipality’s names ===
All three of Matzenbach's constituent communities have names ending in the syllable —bach (German for “brook”), as do many other places in the region. This places each one's founding in about the 8th century, in the time when the land was being settled by the Franks. The part prefixed to each name has its own history.

==== Matzenbach (main centre) ====
The name prefix Matzen— goes back to a man named Mazzo, who may well have founded the village, and thus the name would mean “Mazzo’s Brook”. According to an entry in volume IV of the Acta Academiae Theodoro Palatinae, Matzenbach had its first documentary mention in 1360. Its first mention in an original document came in the earlier half of the 15th century. In both these mentions, the spelling used for the name was the same as the current spelling. Nonetheless, there have been variant spellings over the ages, such as Matzennbach in 1593 and Mazenbach in 1600.

==== Eisenbach ====
The first record of this village's name comes from 1270, when it was given as Isinbach. Other forms of the name that the village has borne over the ages are Ysenbach (1332, 1446, 1480 and 1545), Ysenburg (1460) and Eißenbach (1593). According to researchers Dolch and Greule, the name prefix Isen— or Eisen— (the latter and current form being the German word for “iron”) refers to the iron-bearing inclusions that crop up in the sandstone deposits near the village. The 1460 spelling with the ending —burg may simply be a spelling mistake. Only documentary mentions from 1456, 1460 and 1480 come from original documents.

==== Gimsbach ====
The name prefix Gims— goes back to a man named Ginnin, who may well have founded the village, and thus the name would mean “Ginnin’s Brook”. The name Ginninspach first cropped up in a document that was issued sometime around the year 1200. Other forms of the name that the village has borne over the ages are Gimmespach (1321), Gymmssbach (1393), Gimspach (1430), Gymßbach (1460), Gymbßbach (1482), Gymbschbach (about 1500), Gimßbach (1545), Gimbsbach (1593) and Gimschbach (1797). In the local speech, the name is commonly pronounced “Gimschbach” (German pronunciation: [ˈɡɪmʃbax]).

== Religion ==
=== Matzenbach (main centre) ===
It is likely that Matzenbach belonged before the Reformation to the Church of Theisbergstegen. During the time of the Reformation, all the subjects of the Duchy of Palatinate-Zweibrücken converted on the Count Palatine's orders to Lutheran belief. After the Thirty Years' War, freedom of religion prevailed, which led during the occupation by French King Louis XIV's troops and also during the Electorate of the Palatinate epoch after 1733 to the Catholic faith's being more strongly supported. As can be seen from statistics, though, that had no particular effect either for Matzenbach or for many other villages around the Potzberg. On the other hand, many Christians who followed John Calvin’s Reformed teachings came here and settled who had hardly set foot in other parts of the County Palatine of Veldenz. These Calvinists at first owned within the Ämter of Lauterecken and Reichenbach one church, which stood in Neunkirchen am Potzberg. In 1774, though, a branch church linked with the one in Neunkirchen sprang up in Gimsbach. Matzenbach now had Christians of the Lutheran, Reformed and Roman Catholic denominations. After the union of the Lutheran and Reformed Churches in 1818, the great majority of Matzenbach's inhabitants belonged to the Protestant Church of the Palatinate (since 1976 the Evangelical Church of the Palatinate) in the Gimsbach branch church of Neunkirchen within the deaconry of Kusel.

=== Eisenbach ===
Eisenbach lay in the Remigiusland, thereby belonging since its founding to a lordly domain of the Church of Reims, although in ecclesiastical organization, it was subject to the Archbishopric of Mainz. Within regional ecclesiastical organization, the village always belonged to the Church of Theisbergstegen. In the age of the Reformation, all the inhabitants converted in 1534 first to Lutheranism and then in 1588, on Count Palatine Johannes I's orders, from Lutheranism to Calvinism. The village belonged even then to the Church of Kusel. During the 19th century, hardly any Catholics lived in the village. Even by 1961, of the 141 inhabitants, only 5 belonged to the Catholic Church. Today, the Evangelical Christians belong to the Gimsbach branch of the church community of Neunkirchen am Potzberg in the deaconry of Kusel.

=== Gimsbach ===
Before the time of the Reformation, the village belonged to the Church of Theisbergstegen. About 1530, all the inhabitants converted to Lutheranism on the principle of cuius regio, eius religio, and the Counts Palatine of Zweibrücken at that time only held with Lutheranism. After the Thirty Years' War, freedom of religion prevailed. During the occupation by French King Louis XIV's troops and also during the Electorate of the Palatinate epoch after 1733, the Catholic faith was more strongly supported in the County Palatine of Veldenz. As can be seen from statistics, though, that had no particular effect either for Gimsbach or for many other villages around the Potzberg. Although the Reformed faith according to John Calvin's teaching was never promoted by the state in the County Palatine of Veldenz, there nevertheless came to be, by and by, quite a number of Christians of this denomination in Gimsbach, numbers that could have been strengthened by newcomers from the neighbouring Duchy of Palatinate-Zweibrücken. Said to be the hub for those of the Reformed faith in the Ämter of Lauterecken and Reichenbach was at first the Reformed church in Neunkirchen. Of course, having the Potzberg with its steep slopes standing between them and their church made it quite hard for the Calvinists to attend services, and thus in 1774 in Gimsbach, another Reformed church arose, which was financed with donations from all over the world. It is a building of special worth to art history, a five-sided, enclosed aisleless church whose flat roof is borne by two rows of wooden columns. The roof itself is crowned with a turret. After the union of the Lutheran and Reformed Churches in the Palatinate in 1818, there was only one Protestant church, and now the Lutherans, too, could attend church in their own village. Today the village belongs as a branch to the church community of Neunkirchen and to the Evangelical Church of the Palatinate deaconry of Kusel. The Catholics belong, as before, to the Church of the Remigiusberg in the deaconry of Kusel.

== Politics ==
=== Municipal council ===
The council is made up of 12 council members, who were elected by majority vote at the municipal election held on 7 June 2009, and the honorary mayor as chairman.

=== Mayor ===
Matzenbach's mayor is Andrea Müller, elected in 2020.

=== Coat of arms ===
The municipality's arms might be described thus: A bend wavy argent between azure issuant from the bend a waterwheel spoked of four of the first, and vert a cross Latin surmounting the horns of a moon decrescent, both of the first.

The bend wavy (slanted stripe) symbolizes the river Glan. The charge emerging above this, the waterwheel, recalls the old mills in Matzenbach and Gimsbach, which still stand but are no longer used as such, and were economically important in days of yore. Under the bend wavy stands an unusual charge, a cross with a crescent-moon-shaped hook, a device that formerly appeared on Eisenbach's municipal limit markers.

Before Matzenbach, Eisenbach and Gimsbach were amalgamated into the current Ortsgemeinde of Matzenbach in 1971, each bore its own arms. These three old coats of arms and the current arms are shown here for comparison.

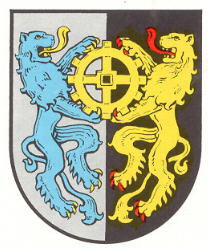
Matzenbach's old coat of arms

Eisenbach's old coat of arms

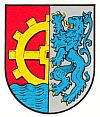
Gimsbach's old coat of arms

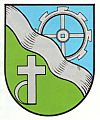
Amalgamated municipality's current coat of arms

== Culture and sightseeing ==
=== Buildings ===
The following are listed buildings or sites in Rhineland-Palatinate’s Directory of Cultural Monuments:

==== Matzenbach (main centre) ====
- Eisenbachstraße 2 – former school; sandstone-framed plastered building with ridge turret, last fourth of the 19th century; in back a barn
- Near Eisenbachstraße 2 – former washing steps, 13 sandstone steps
- Fockenberger Straße 6 – Quereinhaus (a combination residential and commercial house divided for these two purposes down the middle, perpendicularly to the street), marked 1774; household well, smokehouse, oven in the commercial building from 1912
- Moorstraße 9 – former gristmill; ten-axis building with half-hipped roof, marked 1835; house 1921, architect Bruno Seyfarth, Kaiserslautern; characterizes village’s appearance

==== Eisenbach ====
- Eisenbachstraße 19 – one-floor Quereinhaus, marked 1801

==== Gimsbach ====
- Protestant church, Neunkircher Straße 9 – Baroque aisleless church with ridge turret, marked 1747; furnishings
- Glanstraße 25 – corner estate, latter half of the 19th century; sandstone-framed bungalow, sandstone-framed commercial building
- Glanstraße 26 – Quereinhaus with half-hipped roof, marked 1776, conversion 1830, stable wing after 1928, adjoining at a right angle a former inn, orchard; characterizes street’s appearance
- Neunkircher Straße 22 – former mill; U-shaped complex, founded 1714; one-floor dwelling and mill building, 1826, commercial buildings 1853 and 1887

Since 2002, Matzenbach has been a recognized tourist community. In the outlying centre of Gimsbach is a solar-heated outdoor swimming pool.

=== Culture and regular events ===
==== Matzenbach (main centre) ====
With the restructuring of the population and the expansion of the holidaymakers’ community, cultural life, too, was given new stimulus. Nevertheless, the local clubs are still to be seen as the main supporters of culture, especially the singing club and the countrywomen's club. R. Stemler (1985) reported that Matzenbach had “well organized singing evenings that are always gladly attended and make for a pleasant variety in the winter. Many an elderly birthday boy is gladdened with a serenade, many a fellow citizen, whom we are guiding on his last journey, is honoured with a song.” Old customs are still kept. On Walpurgis Night, the young lads raise a Maypole to music. The most important village festival is the kermis (church consecration festival, locally known as the Kerwe), which is held on the first weekend in August. Even now, on the first day of Whitsun, the village's children still parade through the village, observing the custom of the Pfingstquack (Whitsun is Pfingsten in German); the —quack part of the custom's name refers to a rhyme that the children recite as they go door to door begging for money with their gorse-decked wagon. The rhyme generally begins with the line “Quack, Quack, Quack”.

==== Eisenbach ====
Cultural work exists in a large measure in collaboration with the whole municipality's clubs. The kermis is held together with Matzenbach on the first weekend in August. The still preserved old customs, too, are more strongly in line with those in the other two centres. The same goes for club life.

==== Gimsbach ====
With the restructuring of the population and the expansion of the holidaymakers’ community, cultural life, too, was given new stimulus. Nevertheless, the local clubs are still to be seen as the main supporters of culture. Old customs are still kept. On Walpurgis Night, the young lads raise a Maypole to music. The most important village festival is the kermis (church consecration festival, locally known as the Kerwe), which is held on the last weekend in June. Even now, on the first day of Whitsun, the village's children still parade through the village, observing the custom of the Pfingstquack (see above under Matzenbach).

=== Clubs ===
==== Matzenbach (main centre) ====
As of 2007, the following clubs exist in Matzenbach:

- Angelsportverein — angling club
- FC Matzenbach — football club
- Freiwillige Feuerwehr — volunteer fire brigade
- Gemischter Chor — mixed choir
- Landfrauenverein — countrywomen's club
- Ortsverein der SPD — Social Democratic Party of Germany local chapter
- Sportverein Rehweiler-Matzenbach — sport club

==== Gimsbach ====
There is still a tight social cohesion in Gimsbach today, where the following clubs can be found:

- Förderkreis Schwimmbad — swimming pool promotional association
- Landfrauenverein — countrywomen's club
- Männergesangverein Liederkranz — men's singing club

== Economy and infrastructure ==
=== Economic structure ===
==== Matzenbach (main centre) ====
Throughout the earlier times when agriculture was the foremost livelihood in the village, the mill in Matzenbach was an important branch of the local economy. This mill, the Matzenbacher Mühle, had its first documentary mention as early as 1360 and may well be among the district's oldest mills. It was long linked with an oilmill. After the Second World War, it became one of the many mills that succumbed to the great mill die-off in Germany. Housed in the stately building is a popular restaurant-inn, which also offers overnight lodgings. Businesses worthy of mention are a fruit distillery, insurance agencies and a carpentry shop that specializes in renovating antique furniture.

==== Eisenbach ====
Eisenbach's populace originally earned its livelihood mainly at agriculture. Today, workforce members must for the most part commute elsewhere to their jobs. One branch of the economy with a promising future is tourism.

==== Gimsbach ====
Gimsbach, too, had a mill in earlier, agricultural times, the Schreckmühle (or, to use its original name, the Schröckmühle). It had two waterwheels, one each for the gristmill and the husking mill. The mill's work, however, was often compromised by farmers from Gimsbach and Neunkirchen drawing water from the brook without authorization to water their meadows. After the Second World War, the mill was shut down for good, and the building now serves only as a house. Another local industry was the mines at the Potzberg, along with a quicksilver mine in Gimsbach itself. Historian Johann Goswin Widder reported in 1788 that a vein of quicksilver ore had been found, and that the pit employed three workers. In the foregoing year, 233 pounds (Pfund) had been mined. Today, Gimsbach is mainly a residential community for commuters. Businesses in the village include a bakery, a transport company with cars for hire and a fruit distillery.

=== Education ===
The local schoolhouses that once characterized education in this region had to be closed in the course of school restructuring in 1970. Since then, primary school pupils and Hauptschule students from all three of Matzenbach's centres have been attending their respective schools in Glan-Münchweiler. Nearby Gymnasien can be found in Kusel and Landstuhl. University towns in the broader region are Kaiserslautern (Kaiserslautern University of Technology), Saarbrücken (Saarland University), Trier (University of Trier) and Mainz (University of Mainz, University of Applied Sciences Mainz, Catholic University of Applied Sciences Mainz). What follows is school history for Matzenbach's three centres.

==== Matzenbach (main centre) ====
Schooling had its beginning in Matzenbach with the feudal lords’ efforts during the time of the Reformation to further education so that their subjects could have access to Holy Writ. However, the Thirty Years' War and its consequences put an end to any such efforts. Only during the 18th century did Matzenbach get its own school, although it seems likely that classes were held in private premises. In Bavarian times, there were plans for a Matzenbach-Eisenbach school association and for building a schoolhouse for both villages. In 1827, this school association was finally founded, even though Eisenbach then belonged to the Canton and Landcommissariat (district) of Kusel and Matzenbach to the Canton of Landstuhl and the Landcommissariat of Homburg. At the same time, a schoolhouse was built whose financing was shared three-fifths by Matzenbach and two-fifths by Eisenbach. There was a woman teacher at this school by about 1840. Despite the schoolhouse's favourable location between the two villages, in the time that followed, Eisenbach parents sometimes refused to send their children to school over in Matzenbach (where the schoolhouse actually stood) but this ended once the government threatened to punish wayward parents. The schoolhouse was wanting in many ways, and in 1880, on the school grounds beside the old schoolhouse, a new one arose. This one had a little belltower.

==== Eisenbach ====
Efforts certainly arose as early as the 16th century for Eisenbach to have its own school, though the Thirty Years' War and its consequences put an end to any such efforts. In the 18th century, a joint school was established for the villages of Etschberg, Godelhausen and Eisenbach, with the school's seat in Etschberg as of 1711, and then beginning in 1721 in Godelhausen. Also arising in each of these three centres alongside the joint school were winter schools (schools geared towards an agricultural community's practical needs, held in the winter, when farm families had a bit more time to spare), with the one in Godelhausen known to have been running by 1781. In this same year, the municipality of Eisenbach hired the Lutheran schoolteacher Daniel Sauerwein, who taught at the winter school. In this time, there was quite a brisk teacher turnover. Johann Jakob Strauß from Rehweiler, 24 years old, was transferred in 1785 from the Eisenbach winter school to Schellweiler. After him came Johann Jakob Müller from Eckersweiler, 29 years old, to the Eisenbach winter school. The Catholic schoolchildren may have attended a Catholic school in Frutzweiler. Whether or not this was so, Catholic parents were complaining that the way to school for their children was too far. In 1783, historical records mention that owing to poverty and being forced by parents to work in the family business, many children could not go to school. In 1784, school was being taught by 29-year-old schoolteacher Johann Jakob Müller, who came from Eckersweiler. In 1791, a schoolteacher named Philipp Matzenbacher was mentioned. In 1792, a schoolteacher named Diehl taught 13 children. Only in Bavarian times did Eisenbach split away from the school association, and beginning in 1827, Eisenbach shared a school history with Matzenbach (see above).

==== Gimsbach ====
As in the other centres, schooling had its beginning in Gimsbach with the feudal lords’ efforts during the time of the Reformation to further education so that their subjects could have access to Holy Writ, and likewise, the Thirty Years' War put an end to all their good intentions. Gimsbach got its own school only in the 18th century, although it seems likely that classes were held in private premises. In Bavarian times, there were efforts to establish schools even in the smallest of villages. Plans arose for building a schoolhouse in Gimsbach as early as 1828, and these were soon realized. It was eventually closed in the course of school restructuring in 1970.

=== Transport ===
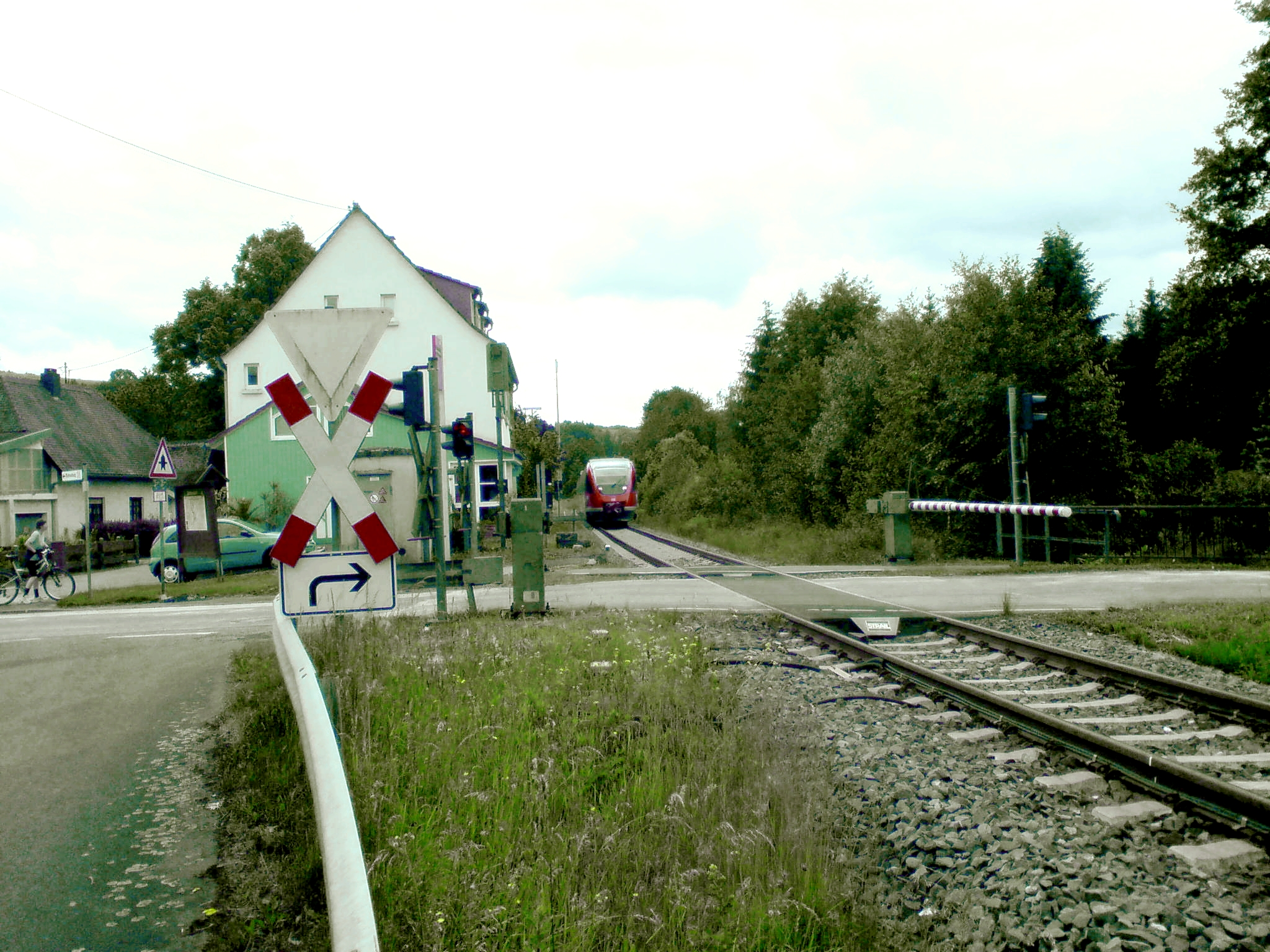
A train stopping at Matzenbach

Matzenbach's main centre once lay on a road coming from Kusel across the uplands that crossed the Glan here and led onwards to Landstuhl and Kaiserslautern. Today, Bundesstraße 423 coming from Altenglan leads through the Glan valley. It leaves the valley near Glan-Münchweiler and leads onwards by way of Schönenberg-Kübelberg and Homburg to the French border near Sarreguemines. Eisenbach is linked to Bundesstraße 423 by a bridge across the river Glan, while Gimsbach lies right on it. Kreisstraße 18 leads from Eisenbach to Godelhausen, an outlying centre of Theisbergstegen, and from there, Landesstraße 362 leads to Kusel. Likewise running through the constituent community of Gimsbach is Landesstraße 364 by way of Neunkirchen am Potzberg to Oberstaufenbach and Landesstraße 367 (Altenglan-Kaiserslautern). The nearest Autobahn interchange to the southwest on the A 62 (Kaiserslautern–Trier) is the one at Glan-Münchweiler, which lies just under 10 km from Matzenbach (main centre), roughly 7 km from Eisenbach and roughly 8 km from Gimsbach. The railway station in Eisenbach's south end serves as a halt named Eisenbach-Matzenbach for hourly trains on the Landstuhl–Kusel railway and is served hourly by Regionalbahn service RB 67 to and from Kaiserslautern, called the Glantalbahn (the name of which refers to the Glan Valley Railway, which shared some of the route of the Landstuhl–Kusel line, including through Eisenbach-Matzenbach). Its location puts it two kilometres from Gimsbach.

== Famous people ==
=== Sons and daughters of the municipality ===
- August Leppla (b. 12 August 1859; d. 12 April 1924 in Wiesbaden) — Professor of geology, born at the mill at Matzenbach, he studied at Aachen, Munich and Strasbourg. At first a Gymnasium teacher, he held high offices as a geologist in Munich and Berlin; he was a professor from 1904. He received many decorations and was an honorary member of the Pollichia, a conservation and research body with concentration on Rhineland-Palatinate.
- Richard Leppla (b. 9 June 1914; d. 4 August 1988 in Homburg) — A Second World War fighter pilot, he was likewise born at the mill at Matzenbach. He was awarded the Knight's Cross of the Iron Cross. After the war, he studied economics, and later he was a staff officer in the Bundeswehr.

=== Famous people associated with the municipality ===
- Maria Elisabeth “Ria” Stemmler, née Hartmüller (b. 1916 in Mertesheim; d. 2004 in Matzenbach) — A writer and a railway official's daughter, her father was transferred to Eisenbach in 1932. She married a master carpenter named Walter Stemmler in 1938, who in 1945 managed to establish his own livelihood in neighbouring Matzenbach. Beginning in 1973 she published poems and narratives. Some of her dialectal poems won prizes in contests.
