= Niederstaufenbach =

- Municipality
- Coat of arms

- Location of Niederstaufenbach within Kusel district
- Interactive map of Niederstaufenbach
- Location within Germany Location within Rhineland-Palatinate
- Coordinates: 49°31′43″N 7°31′05″E
- Country: Germany
- State: Rhineland-Palatinate
- District: Kusel
- Municipal assoc.: Kusel-Altenglan

Government
  - Mayor (2019–24): Karl Hahnenberger

Area
  - Total: 2.01 km^{2} (0.78 sq mi)
- Elevation: 240 m (790 ft)

Population (2025-12-31)
  - Total: 245
  - Density: 122/km^{2} (316/sq mi)
- Time zone: UTC+01:00 (CET)
  - Summer (DST): UTC+02:00 (CEST)
- Postal codes: 66879
- Dialling codes: 06385
- Vehicle registration: KUS

Niederstaufenbach is an Ortsgemeinde – a municipality belonging to a Verbandsgemeinde, a kind of collective municipality – in the Kusel district in Rhineland-Palatinate, Germany. It belongs to the Verbandsgemeinde of Kusel-Altenglan, whose seat is in Kusel.

== Geography ==
=== Location ===
Niederstaufenbach lies in the Western Palatinate between the Walbersberg and the Krämel (mountains), on both sides of the Reichenbach in a broad hollow roughly a kilometre and a half up from where the Bosenbach empties into the Reichenbach. The village sits at an elevation of roughly 240 m above sea level between the villages of Oberstaufenbach and Friedelhausen. On the dale's west side, the ground climbs up steeply to the Potzberg (hill) and to the neighbouring village of Föckelberg. Stretching east of the dale is a somewhat higher mountain ridge (Hertelwald 338 m) between the Reichenbach valley and the Walsbach and Bosenbach valleys. Rising in the south, within neighbouring Oberstaufenbach's limits, is the mountain Heidenburg, from which the village might have got its name (see Municipality's name below). The municipal area measures 201 ha, of which 31 ha is wooded and roughly 6 ha is settled.

=== Neighbouring municipalities ===
Niederstaufenbach borders in the north on the municipality of Bosenbach, in the east on the municipality of Reichenbach-Steegen, in the south on the municipality of Oberstaufenbach and in the west on the municipality of Föckelberg.

=== Municipality's layout ===
Niederstaufenbach's old village core lies on the Reichenbach's left bank on a small side brook known in old border descriptions as the Limbach, but it is not to be confused with another stream by that name near Oberstaufenbach. The Limbach at Niederstaufenbach rises near Föckelberg on the slope of the Potzberg. In this part of the village stand Einfirsthäuser ("single-roof-ridge houses"), a kind of farmhouse found throughout the Westrich, an historic region that encompasses areas in both Germany and France. An extensive new building zone stretches out on the brook's right bank next to the road going towards Bosenbach. The Niederstaufenbacher Mühle (mill) stands down the dale, likewise on the right bank at the old millrace. Towards the end of the 20th century, the municipality opened a building zone on the way to Friedelhausen. A further new building zone was laid out up from the graveyard.

== History ==
=== Antiquity ===
The area around what is now Niederstaufenbach was already settled in prehistoric times, for around the plateau of the Heidenburg ran a Celtic ringwall, although owing to quarrying, nothing of it can now be made out. Indeed, the mountain's name, Heidenburg, means "heathen castle" in German. Thus far, no Roman or pre-Roman archaeological finds have been unearthed right near the village.

=== Middle Ages ===
Just when Niederstaufenbach was founded cannot now be said, although the placename ending —bach offers a clue, for villages whose names end thus usually date back to sometime in the 8th or 9th century. At the time of its founding, the village still lay in the Imperially immediate Reichsland of the Vosagus (the Vosges) lying in a broad area around the royal estate at Lautern (Kaiserslautern). No later than sometime during the 14th century, the Imperially immediate areas around Kaiserslautern were given to counties that bordered on the Reichsland as Imperial pledges. Thus Niederstaufenbach, together with Bosenbach, Elzweiler, Horschbach and all the villages in the Eßweiler Tal (dale), passed into the ownership of the Waldgraves and Rhinegraves of Grumbach, whereas the villages of the Amt of Reichenbach passed to the County of Veldenz. Since in the Niederstaufenbach area the Limbach and, upstream, the Reichenbach formed the boundary between these two Ämter, the part of the village of Niederstaufenbach on the wedge of land between the two brooks must have belonged to the Amt of Reichenbach (see the mention of "Mittelstaufenbach" under Municipality's name).

=== Modern times ===
In 1595, the Waldgraves and Rhinegraves gave Niederstaufenbach, together with Hachenbach, Horschbach, Elzweiler and Bosenbach, in an exchange for Kirchenbollenbach to the Duchy of Palatinate-Zweibrücken. These villages then became the new Amt of Bosenbach, which remained in existence within Palatinate-Zweibrücken until the French Revolution.

==== Recent times ====
During the time of French rule from 1801 to 1814, Niederstaufenbach belonged to the Mairie ("Mayoralty") of Bosenbach, the Canton of Wolfstein, the Arrondissement of Kaiserslautern and the Department of Mont-Tonnerre (or Donnersberg in German). In 1816, under terms laid out by the Congress of Vienna, the Baierischer Rheinkreis ("Bavarian Rhine District") was founded, a new exclave of the Kingdom of Bavaria. Niederstaufenbach now lay in the Landcommissariat (later Bezirksamt and then Landkreis or district) of Kusel, but still in the Canton of Wolfstein. The Palatinate was held by Bavaria until 1945. Indeed, Niederstaufenbach belongs to the Kusel district even today. The Bürgermeisterei ("Mayoralty") of Bosenbach was dissolved in the course of administrative restructuring in Rhineland-Palatinate in 1968. Since 1 January 1972, Niederstaufenbach has belonged as an Ortsgemeinde to the Verbandsgemeinde of Altenglan.

=== Population development ===
At the time of the 1609 Oberamt of Lichtenberg ecclesiastical visitation, 11 families lived in Niederstaufenbach, made up of 22 married people, 30 children, one widower, one maid and one manservant, and thus 55 inhabitants all together. At that time, no distinction was made between Niederstaufenbach and "Mittelstaufenbach".

The following table shows population development over the centuries for Niederstaufenbach, with some figures broken down by religious denomination:

Year	1609	1825	1835	1871	1905	1939	1961	2003	2006
Total	55	164	218	183	280	287	265	219	300
Catholic	–	87					96
Evangelical	55*	77					156
Other	–	–					13

*This figure dates from before the 1818 Protestant Union and thus actually represents Lutherans and Calvinists.

=== Municipality's name ===
The word Stauf can mean either "chalice" or "crag"/"cliff"/"mountain". In Niederstaufenbach's and Oberstaufenbach's case, the word obviously refers to the mountain called the Heidenburg within Oberstaufenbach's limits. It is likely that the Reichenbach in the Heidenburg area was once called the "Staufenbach". Thus, the brook drew its name from the mountain, and then the villages were named after the brook. Besides the two villages of Niederstaufenbach and Oberstaufenbach (whose prefixes mean "nether"/"lower" and "upper" respectively), old documents sometimes mentioned Mittelstaufenbach (whose prefix means "middle"). This was not a village as such, but rather a smaller part of the village of Niederstaufenbach that did not belong to the Amt of Bosenbach, but rather to the Amt of Reichenbach. The village was mentioned as Stauffenbach in 1322 and 1377, as nieder Stauffenbach in 1393 and as Loch Stauffenbach in 1567. The word Loch that appears before the name in that last mention is most likely not the current German word Loch (generally understood to mean "hole", and not related to the Gaelic word loch), but rather an old word meaning "light forest". This may have been the way that Niederstaufenbach and Oberstaufenbach were distinguished from each other in the Late Middle Ages. According to another version of events, Lochstaufenbach was the part of the village that had belonged to the Duchy of Palatinate-Veldenz, but passed to the Duchy of Palatinate-Zweibrücken in a "regional reform" in 1600.

== Religion ==
Beginning with the Reformation and until the Thirty Years' War ended, all Niederstaufenbach's inhabitants belonged first to the Lutheran faith, and then as of 1588 to the Calvinist (Reformed) faith. Only after the war were members of other denominations once again allowed to settle here. The settling of Catholic Christians was encouraged during French King Louis XIV's wars of conquest through his Politique des Réunions. The village's Protestant Christians originally belonged to the parish of Deinsberg (Theißberg). When Bosenbach was raised to parish in its own right after the Reformation, Niederstaufenbach was grouped into it as a branch. Alongside the Reformed parish, there was also as of 1709 also once again a Lutheran parish in Bosenbach. The Lutherans and Calvinists were united by the 1818 Palatine Union. The united Protestant parish of Bosenbach remained in existence until 1971. The Protestants of Niederstaufenbach and Bosenbach nowadays belong to the Evangelical parish of Jettenbach. The village's Catholics have belonged to the Catholic parish of Reichenbach ever since it was resurrected about 1700.

== Politics ==
=== Municipal council ===
The council is made up of 6 council members, who were elected by majority vote at the municipal election held on 7 June 2009, and the honorary mayor as chairman.

=== Mayor ===
Niederstaufenbach's mayor is Karl Hahnenberger.

=== Coat of arms ===
The municipality's arms might be described thus: Or issuant from base and dexter crags sable and to sinister a lion rampant crowned gules armed and langued azure, on a chief of the second a fess wavy of the first.

Niederstaufenbach's arms bear the same charges in the same composition as Oberstaufenbach's. This was apparently done on purpose. The only heraldic difference lies in the tinctures. The tinctures sable and Or (black and gold) are a reference to the village's former allegiance to the Counts of Veldenz or Palatinate-Zweibrücken, depending on the source, while the lion in gules (red) refers to another former lord, the Duchy of Palatinate-Zweibrücken or the Rhinegraves of Grumbach, again, depending on the source. The crags and the wavy fess on the chief are canting charges for the municipality's name, Stauf being an archaic word for "crag" in German (the usual word is Fels or Felsen), and the wavy fess standing for a brook, or in German, Bach, namely the Reichenbach. The crags to which the arms refer are the Heidenburg. Nieder means the same as its English cognate "nether", namely "lower".

The arms have been borne since 1976 when they were approved by the now defunct Rheinhessen-Pfalz Regierungsbezirk administration in Neustadt an der Weinstraße.

== Culture and sightseeing ==
=== Regular events ===
Niederstaufenbach holds its kermis (church consecration festival) on the first weekend in August. Otherwise, the village has no customs that set it apart from neighbouring villages.

=== Clubs ===
As of 2000, Niederstaufenbach has a music club (no longer active), a men's singing club, a local history club, a women's choir and a Stammtisch.

== Economy and infrastructure ==
=== Economic structure ===
Originally, there were only a few well off farmers living in Niederstaufenbach. The Niederstaufenbacher Mühle (mill), which has been shut down, was named in 1743 and mentioned as having two overshot waterwheels, and the rental price for each wheel was two Malter of corn (wheat or rye) and oats. Alongside the few farmers, few could claim to be craftsmen. As agriculture lost its importance, the number of workers rose. Beginning in the late 18th century, the Potzberg's outlying hills were being prospected for quicksilver. Furthermore, a coal mine was being worked in Niederstaufenbach. In the 19th and 20th centuries, many villagers were employed as quarrymen at the Heidenburg quarry near Oberstaufenbach and at the quarries on the Schneeweiderhof. Today, the village's businesses are an automobile repair shop, a window manufacturing company, a private engineering company for construction and two inns.

=== Education ===
Until the 18th century, Niederstaufenbach's schoolchildren had to attend school in Bosenbach. Both the Protestants' and the Catholics' efforts to hire their own schoolteacher for Niederstaufenbach failed. Several times in records, clues crop up suggesting that both denominations had, for short terms only, hired so-called Schulmeister. These cannot be considered scholastic institutions, however. Only in 1833 did Niederstaufenbach build its own schoolhouse. By that time, the Catholics already had their own schoolteacher, and meanwhile, the Protestant schoolchildren had still been attending classes in Bosenbach. The new schoolhouse in Niederstaufenbach, however, was to be run as a denominationally communal school. A new schoolhouse was built in Niederstaufenbach about 1960. Nowadays, those from Niederstaufenbach attending school go to either the primary school in Rammelsbach or the Hauptschule (Regionale Schule) in Altenglan.

=== Transport ===
Running through the bedroom community of Niederstaufenbach is Landesstraße 367, which was expanded in the mid 19th century. In the village centre, a linking road, Kreisstraße 34, branches off to Bosenbach. To the southwest runs the Autobahn A 62 (Kaiserslautern–Trier). The nearest Autobahn interchanges lie 15 and 25 km away. Serving Altenglan 5 km away is Altenglan station, which is on the Landstuhl–Kusel railway and is served by Regionalbahn service RB 67, called the Glantalbahn (the name of which refers to the Glan Valley Railway, which shared some of the route of the Landstuhl–Kusel line, including the former railway junction at Altenglan). The station in Kaiserslautern lies 30 km away.
