= Potzberg Tower =

Coordinates: 49°31′14″N 7°28′49″E

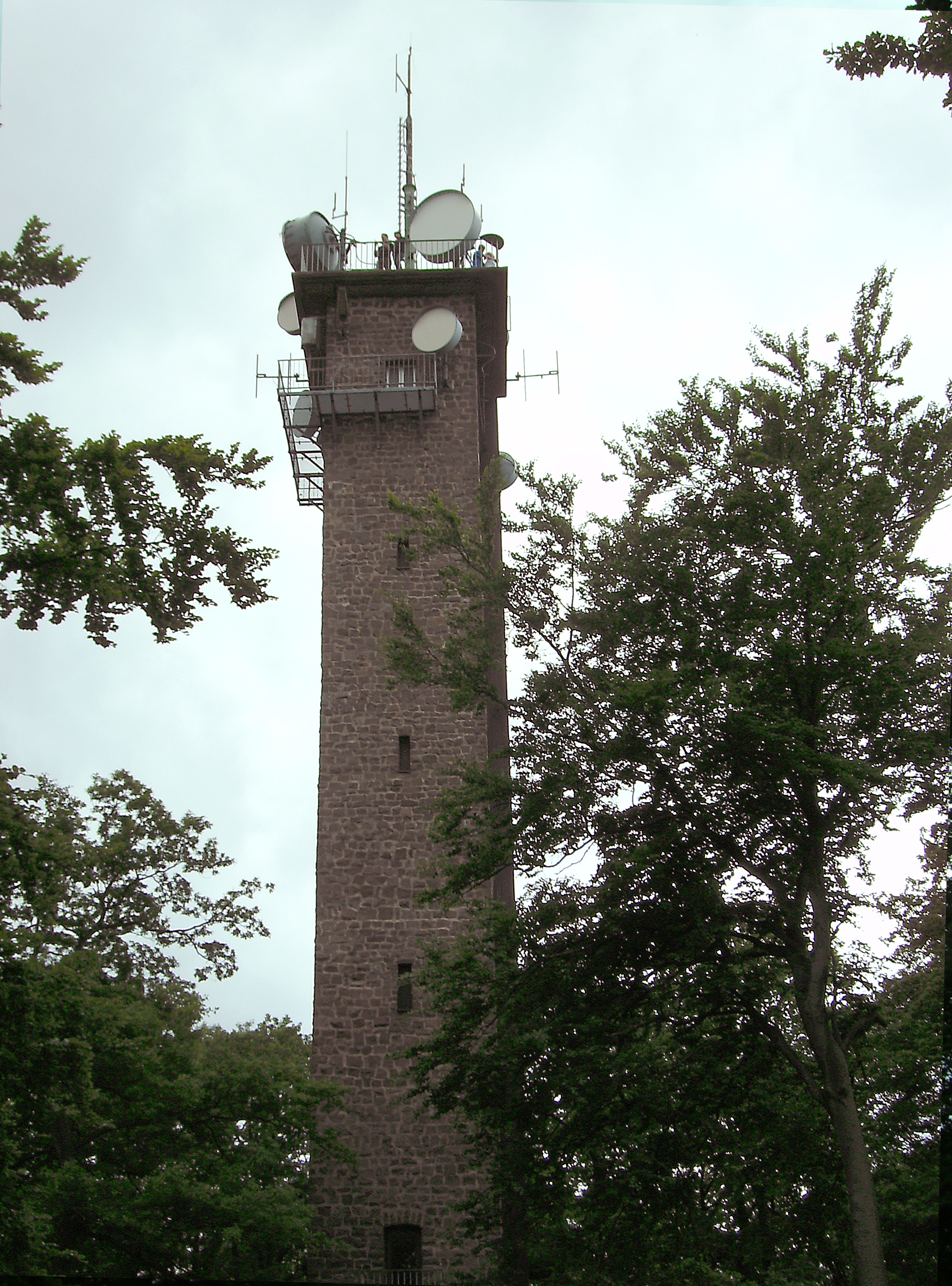
Potzbergturm.

The Potzberg Tower (German: Potzbergturm) is a 53.5-metre-high lookout and transmitting tower on the Potzberg at Föckelberg, Rhineland-Palatinate, Germany. It was built between 13 October 1951 and 2 December 1951 and consists of a 35-metre-high bricked tower with a footprint of 4 by 7 metres, on which are 18.5-metre-high radio towers. The tower was inaugurated on 13 July 1952.

== See also ==
List of towers
