= Jettenbach =

- Municipality
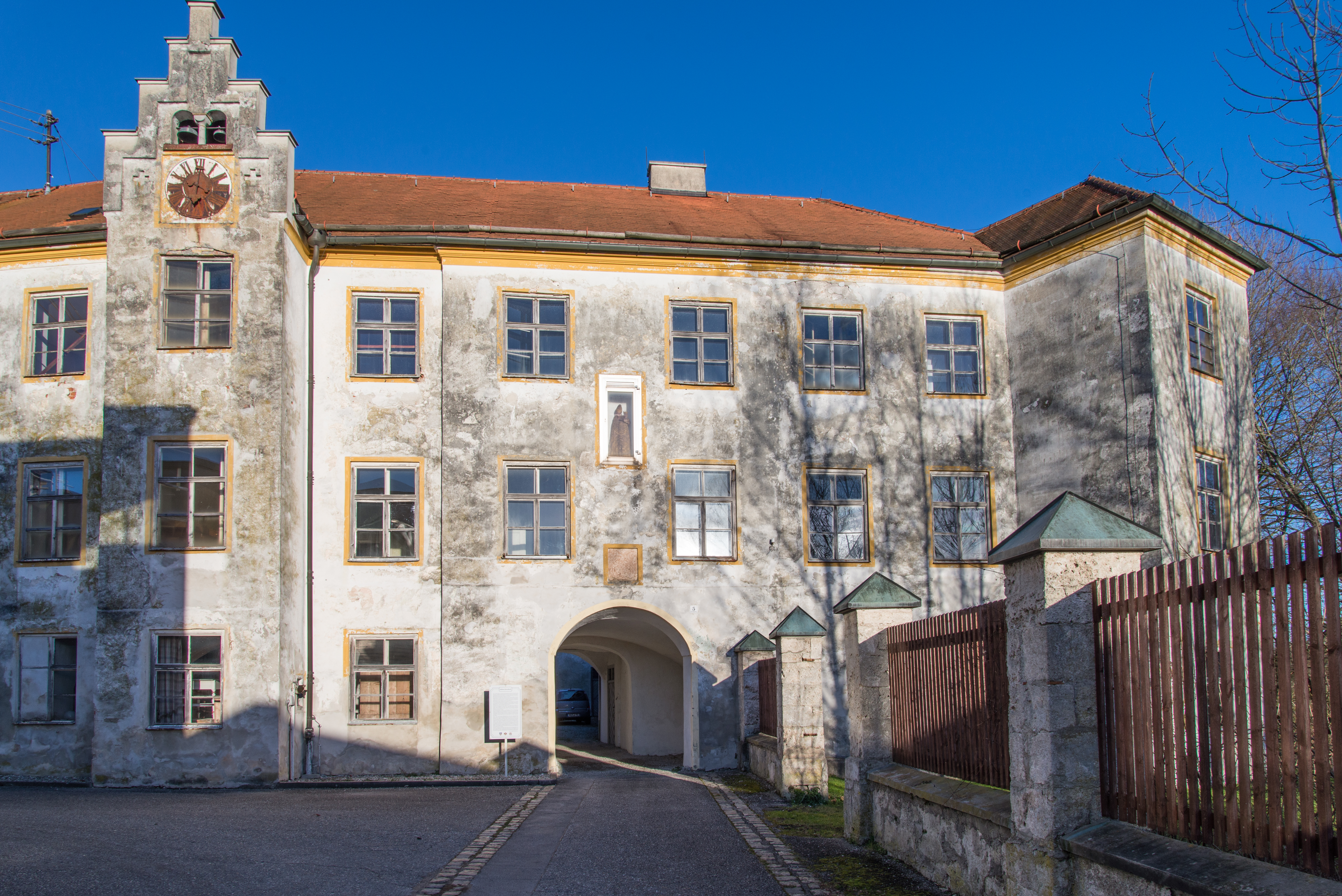
- Jettenbach Castle

- Coat of arms

- Location of Jettenbach within Mühldorf am Inn district
- Interactive map of Jettenbach
- Location within Germany Location within Bavaria
- Coordinates: 48°10′N 12°23′E
- Country: Germany
- State: Bavaria
- Admin. region: Oberbayern
- District: Mühldorf am Inn
- Municipal assoc.: Kraiburg am Inn

Government
  - Mayor (2020–26): Maria Maier

Area
  - Total: 9.18 km^{2} (3.54 sq mi)
- Elevation: 418 m (1,371 ft)

Population (2025-12-31)
  - Total: 782
  - Density: 85.2/km^{2} (221/sq mi)
- Time zone: UTC+01:00 (CET)
  - Summer (DST): UTC+02:00 (CEST)
- Postal codes: 84555
- Dialling codes: 08638
- Vehicle registration: MÜ
- Website: www.jettenbach-am-inn.de

Jettenbach (German pronunciation: [ˈjɛtn̩bax]) is a municipality in the district of Mühldorf in Bavaria, Germany. It lies on the river Inn.
