= Reichenbach-Steegen =

- Municipality
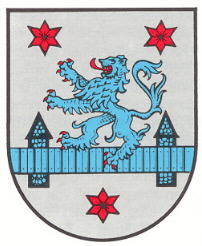
- Coat of arms

- Location of Reichenbach-Steegen within Kaiserslautern district
- Interactive map of Reichenbach-Steegen
- Location within Germany Location within Rhineland-Palatinate
- Coordinates: 49°30′10″N 7°32′11″E
- Country: Germany
- State: Rhineland-Palatinate
- District: Kaiserslautern
- Municipal assoc.: Weilerbach
- Subdivisions: 4

Government
  - Mayor (2019–24): Dirk Wagner (SPD)

Area
  - Total: 15.13 km^{2} (5.84 sq mi)
- Elevation: 280 m (920 ft)

Population (2025-12-31)
  - Total: 1,442
  - Density: 95.31/km^{2} (246.8/sq mi)
- Time zone: UTC+01:00 (CET)
  - Summer (DST): UTC+02:00 (CEST)
- Postal codes: 66879
- Dialling codes: 06385
- Vehicle registration: KL
- Website: www.reichenbach-steegen.de

Reichenbach-Steegen (German pronunciation: [ˈʁaɪçn̩bax ˈʃteːɡn̩]) is a municipality in the district of Kaiserslautern, in Rhineland-Palatinate, western Germany. It has a twin town in France, Magny-en-Vexin.
