= Glan-Münchweiler station =

Railway station in Glan-Münchweiler, Germany

Glan-Münchweiler
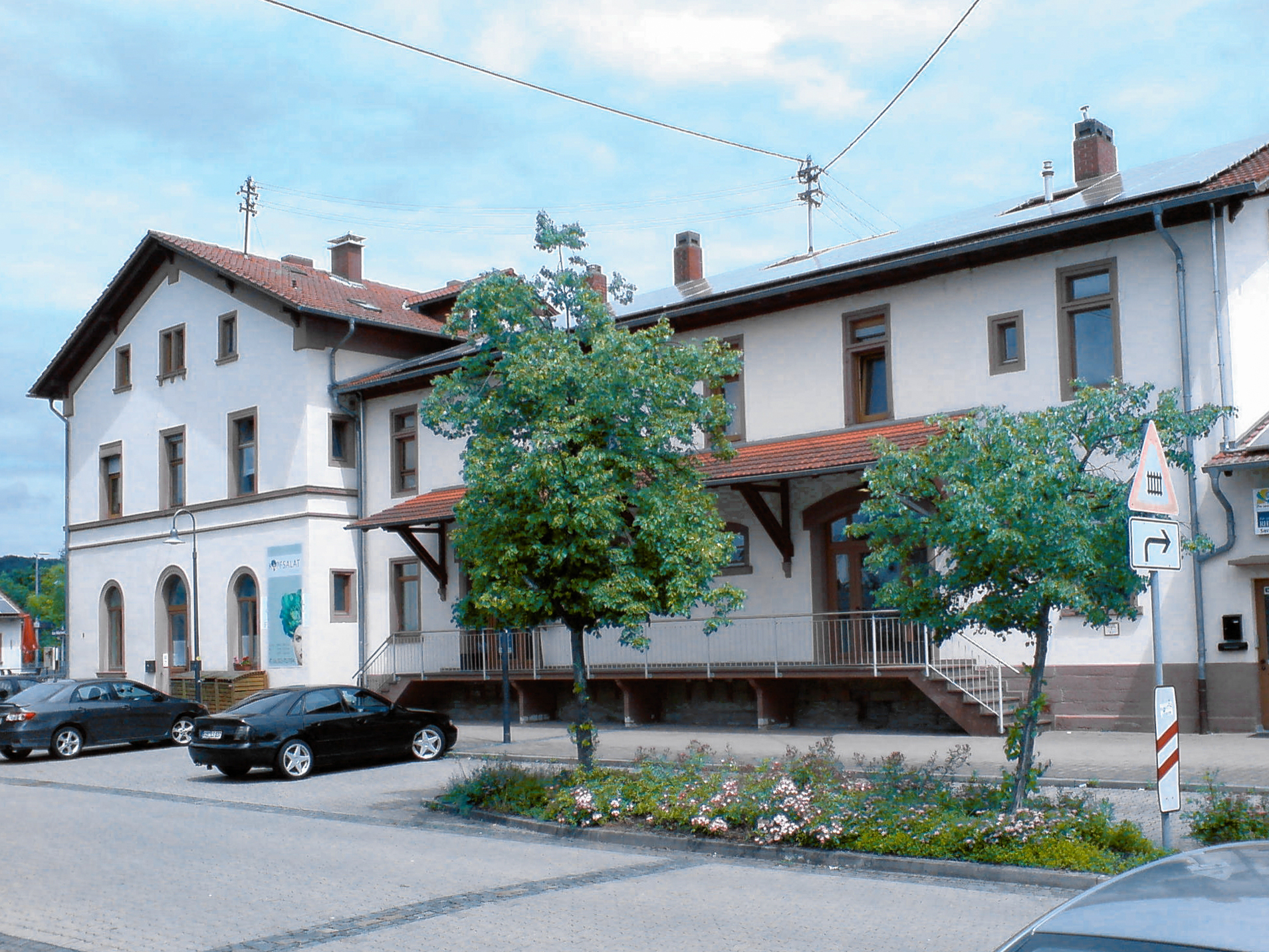

General information
- Location: Bahnhofstr. 3, Glan-Münchweiler, Rhineland-Palatinate; Germany
- Coordinates: 49°28′13″N 7°26′41″E
- Lines: Landstuhl–Kusel (13.9); Homburg–Bad Münster (21.8 km)
- Platforms: 2

Construction
- Accessible: Yes

Other information
- Station code: 2136
- DS100 code: SGM
- IBNR: 8002286
- Category: 6
- Fare zone: VRN: 790
- Website: www.bahnhof.de

History
- Opened: 22 September 1868

Services
Preceding station	DB Regio Mitte	Following station
Rehweiler towards Kusel	RB 67	Niedermohr towards Kaiserslautern Hbf
Location

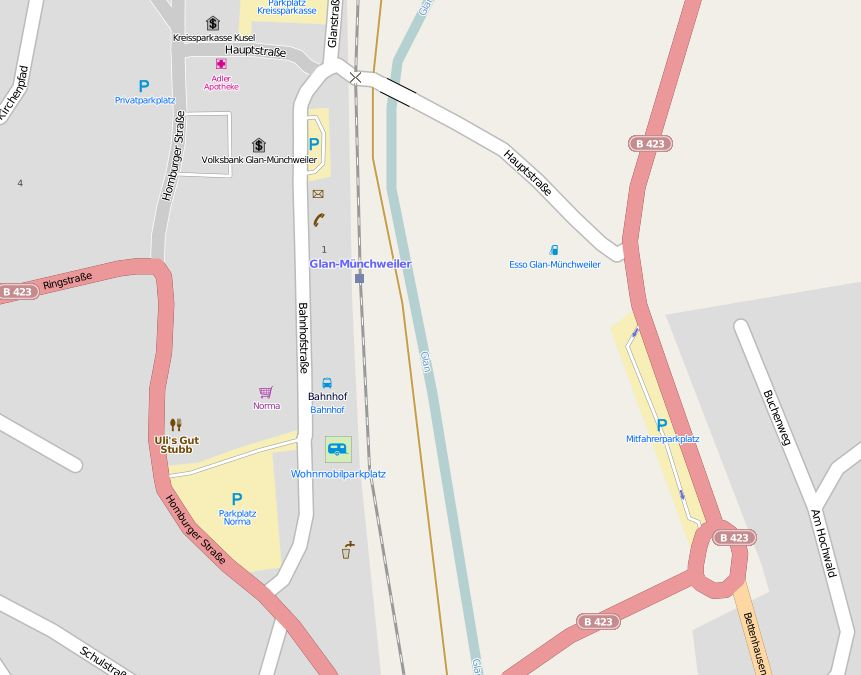
Map of the Glan-Münchweiler station area

Glan-Münchweiler station (officially called Glanmünchweiler until 1900 and also from 1943 to 1947) is the station of the town of Glan-Münchweiler in the German state of Rhineland-Palatinate. It is classified by Deutsche Bahn as a category 6 station and has two platforms and sidings. The station is located in the network area of the Verkehrsverbund Rhein-Neckar (Rhine-Neckar Transport Association, VRN). The address of the station is Bahnhofstraße 3.

It was created on 22 September 1868 as a through station with the opening of the Landstuhl–Kusel railway. With the completion of the Glan Valley Railway (Glantalbahn), running from Homburg to Bad Münster, on 1 May 1904, which was built as a strategic railway, it became a junction station. It lost this function when the traffic on the latter between Schönenberg-Kübelberg and Glan-Münchweiler was discontinued in the early 1980s and the tracks were subsequently dismantled.

== Location ==
The station has two platform tracks, a bus stop, a parking area and barrier-free access. It is located on the eastern outskirts of Glan-Munchweiler, with the railway line running parallel to Bahnhofstraße. To the north of the station area is the Haupstraße (main street) coming from the west, to the east of the line is Namen Mühlstraße. Just south of the entrance building there is a parking area for camping vans and the local volunteer fire service. To the south of the station area, federal highway 423 crosses the railway line. East of the station is the district of Bettenhausen. The Glan-Blies Way cycling and hiking trail passes just to the east of the station, running to the south along the former Glan Valley Railway to Waldmohr and to the north over long sections of the now dismantled second track of the line to Kusel. In addition, the station is the starting point of the Barbarossa cycling trail, running to the west.

=== Railways ===
The railway line from Landstuhl to Kusel runs to the station from the south-east. The station is at 213.3 metres above sea level and lies between the stations of Niedermohr (chainage: 11.3 km from Landstuhl) to the southeast and Rehweiler (chainage: 23.7 km from Homburg via the closed Glan Valley Railway) to the north.

From 1904 until the mid-1980s, the Glan Valley Railway came from the south-west and connected with the line from Landstuhl just before the station and both lines continued to the north towards Altenglan.

Originally the chainage on the Landstuhl–Kusel line was continuous. After the opening of the Glan Valley Railway, the Glan-Münchweiler–Altenglan section was integrated with it, and initially the chainage started in the west from Scheidt and ran via Glan-Münchweiler and Altenglan to Bad Münster and the chainage at Glan-Münchweiler station was accordingly fixed at 45.6 km. The chainage from Landstuhl ends at Glan-Münchweiler at 13.9 km. Later, the chainage was recalculated on the Glan Valley Railway to start from Homburg and these chainages still apply between Glan-Munchweiler and Altenglan; accordingly the station now has the chainage of 21.8 km.

== History ==
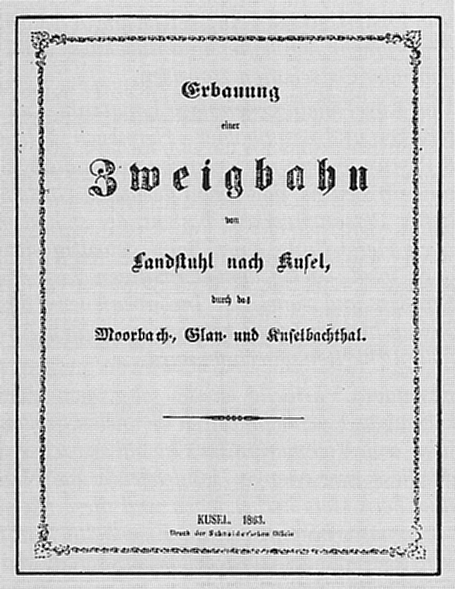
Title page of the memorandum on the construction of the line in 1863

In the early 1860s, the towns of Ramstein and Kusel, which at the time were part of the Kingdom of Bavaria, formed committees to promote the construction of a railway. According to a memorandum published in Kusel in 1861, the railway would branch from the Palatine Ludwig Railway (now the Mannheim–Saarbrücken railway) in Landstuhl and run through the Mohrbach, Glan and Kuselbach valleys to Kusel. In the memorandum, it was argued that, among other things, the railway construction would improve the rather poor economic and social conditions of the region. The construction of the proposed Landstuhl–Kusel line under a concession issued in 1866 was funded by an issue of shares for a total of 1,740,000 guilders. The company also was given a government guarantee on its interest.

The construction of the 28.7 km stretch from Landstuhl to Kusel was largely uncomplicated. Cuttings were only necessary in the country around Rammelsbach, where the work force encountered a diorite deposit, which was mined in the following years and gave an additional impetus to rail transport. The Rammelsbach Tunnel was the largest building project along the line. Construction on the section between Glan-Munchweiler and Kusel was delayed because not enough workers could be recruited. The first freight train ran on 28 August 1868.

Glan-Münchweiler station was officially opened on 20 September 1868 with the Kusel–Landstuhl line. On this day, a special train also ran from Ludwigshafen to Kusel, which carried, apart from officials of the Palatinate Railway (Pfalzbahn), the former Bavarian Minister of State for Trade and Public Works, Gustav Schlör. The new line was very well received by the population, as it improved the infrastructure of the rural region northwest of Kaiserslautern. Two days later, the line was released for regular traffic. There were a total of ten intermediate stations along the line through Glan Munchweiler.

=== Plans a strategic railway (1868–1904) ===
Initially no trains crossed in Glan-Münchweiler and it was only later used for train crossings. Although the possibility of a railway along the Glan, connecting the Saar region and the region around Bingen, would have been obvious from a geographical perspective, the fact that in the 19th century it would have run across the territory of several countries prevented the realisation of the project for some time. In addition, the border between Bavaria and Prussia in the middle and lower Glan valley, especially from Altenglan to Staudernheim, was very irregular, making construction difficult.

Already during the licensing of the Kusel line, there were new efforts to establish a line through the whole length of the Glan valley. As Alsace and Lorraine were incorporated in the German Empire in 1871 as a result of the Franco-Prussian War, the fear that France would start another war in order to regain Alsace-Lorraine developed in Germany and some argued for a railway in the north-south direction along the Glan for strategic military reasons. Prussia, in particular supported this idea. The first draft plan was made for the line in 1871, which essentially corresponded to the line as built, but the proposal quickly failed. Another argument for the construction of the line was that it would create the shortest possible connection between Homburg and Bingen. A connection to the Mannheim–Saarbrücken line at Bruchmühlbach or Hauptstuhl was considered.

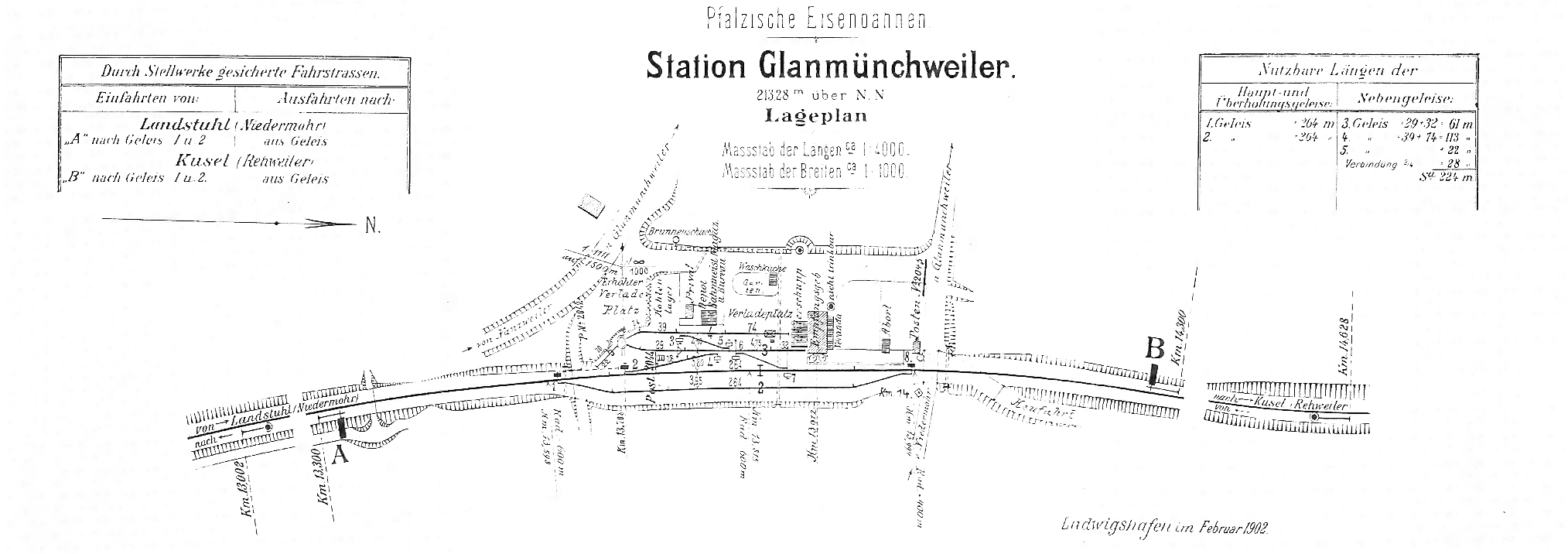
Track plan of 1902

Towards the end of the nineteenth century Bavaria finally abandoned its resistance to the construction of a strategic railway, as Franco-German relations had deteriorated significantly in the meantime. While the Fortress of Metz had already been connected by several lines, the connection from the Rhine was very awkward. After an option running to the south-east was eliminated, the plan for a railway from Mainz via Bad Münster along the Glan, sharing the Kusel line between Altenglan and Glan-Münchweiler was adopted. In 1897, the crossing loop at the station was extended to a total of 500 metres, in order to allow for the crossing of military trains ahead of the planning for the strategic line. In 1899, Glan Munchweiler—like all stations along the line—received completion signals. The new strategic railway was built with two tracks from the outset.

=== Further development (1904–1945) ===
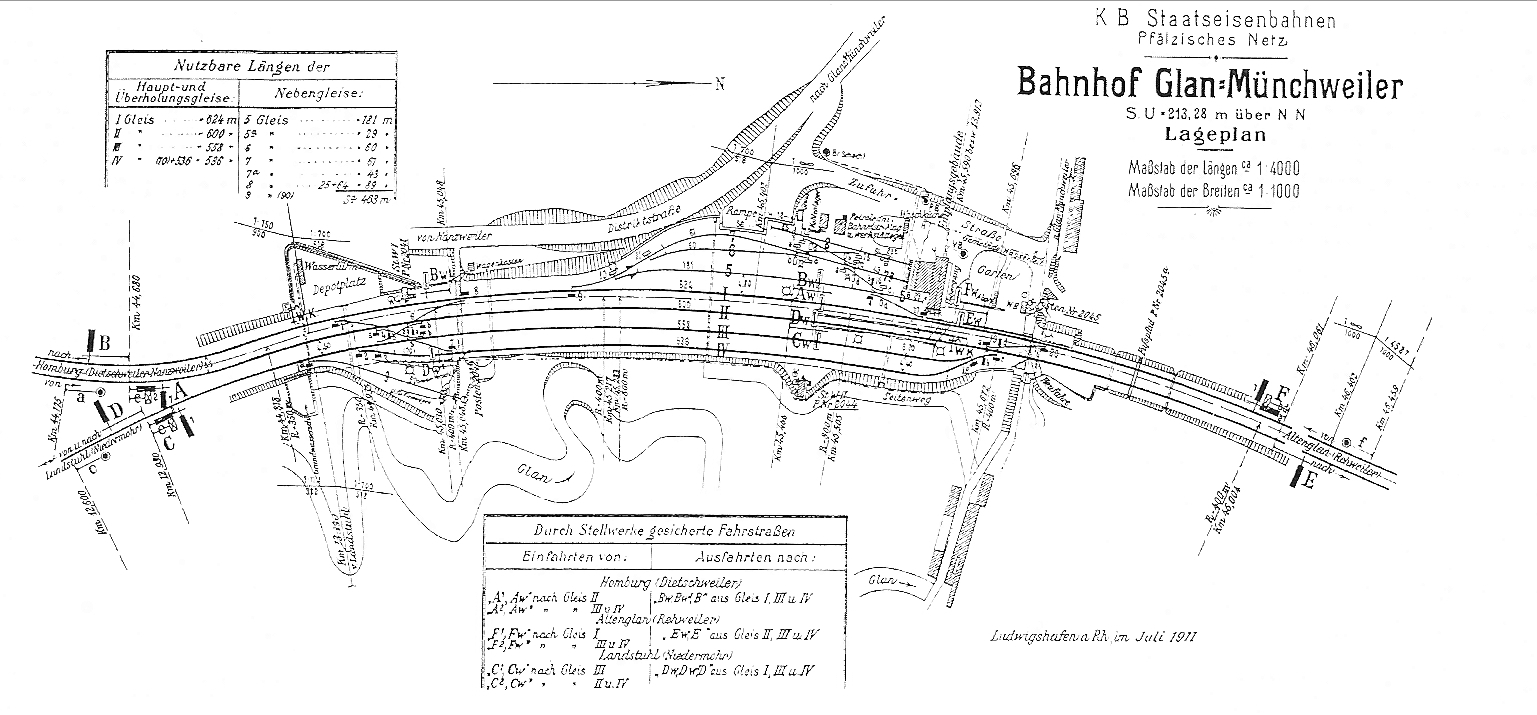
Track plan of 1911

The Glan Valley Railway from Bad Münster to Homburg was opened throughout on 1 May 1904; from Glan-Münchweiler to Altenglan it ran together with the Kusel–Landstuhl railway. This turned Glan-Münchweiler into a railway junction. With the construction of the Glan Valley Railway, there was also a significant extension of the tracks in the station. The timetable of 1913 and 1914 was the only timetable ever which involved one train overtaking another at the station. In it, the stopping passenger train to Homburg had to wait for a faster train from Bad Munster to overtake it.

Between 24 and 27 September 1938, a military exercise was held in the Palatinate. Troop trains from Frankfurt were despatched to various stations, including, among others, Glan-Münchweiler.

Since, during the Second World War, the timetable could often not be met, a directory of “essential trains" was published on 5 May 1941. This included at least six trains per day between Glan Münchweiler and Altenglan and four trains per day between Homburg and Glan-Münchweiler each way.

In 1943 the station was renamed Glanmünchweile, but just four years later it reverted to Glan-Münchweiler.

=== Deutsche Bundesbahn (1949–1993) ===
The fact that the Saarland was removed from Germany after the Second World War, largely contributed to the fact that the traffic between Homburg and Glan-Münchweiler fell steadily in the following years. So from 1956 only five pairs of trains ran between Homburg and Glan-Münchweiler. In the mid-1950s, the local track master’s office (Bahnmeisterei) was closed. In the early 1960s, the second track was dismantled between Glan-Münchweiler and Schönenberg-Kübelberg. In 1962, Sunday traffic was discontinued on the Homburg–Glan-Münchweiler section.

In 1975, Deutsche Bundesbahn applied to formally close freight operations between Glan-Münchweiler and Schönenberg-Kübelberg from 31 December 1975, but this was initially refused. Nevertheless, there already was no freight traffic on this section at that time.

On 30 May 1981, passenger traffic between Homburg and Glan-Münchweiler was discontinued after it had already been reduced to one train running north. This was accompanied by the end of all operations on the Schönenberg-Kübelberg–Glan-Münchweiler section; its total closure took place on 3 June 1984. In order to prevent the operation of local train services, DB removed several hundred metres of track from the section in 1984 without going through a formal closure procedure. Although it had no longer been used as a main line railway for decades, the Glan-Münchweiler–Odernheim section of Glan Valley Railway was not officially downgraded to a branch line until 29 September 1985. Between 28 March and 19 April 1989, one track was removed from the previously double track section between Glan-Münchweiler and Altenglan, although it had already been converted to a single-track operation a year earlier. Subsequently Glan-Münchweiler was closed for freight operations and the number of tracks at the station was reduced to two.

=== Deutsche Bahn (since 1994) ===
A committee was formed in 1994, which had the ultimate goal of reactivating the Glan Valley Railway between Homburg and Glan-Münchweiler. In this context, the tracks would be maintained between Homburg and Waldmohr and the dismantling of the line from Waldmohr would be prevented. So plans were developed to create a cycling path on it.

In 2000, like the entire Western and Anterior Palatinate, the station became part of the area of the newly established Westpfalz-Verkehrsverbundes (Western Palatinate Transport Association, WVV), until it was absorbed six years later into the Verkehrsverbund Rhein-Neckar (Rhine-Neckar Transport Association, VRN). On 18 May 2002, the Glan-Blies-Weg cycling and hiking trail was opened on the now dismantled line between Waldmohr and Glan-Münchweiler; it was gradually completed during the 2001–2006 period.

The modernisation of the station began in the autumn of 2003. This included the rebuilding of the platforms that enabled barrier-free access to trains with a height of 55 centimetres above the rail, the renewal of the lighting, the signals and the telephones, the demolition of the pedestrian bridge running over the railway tracks, the construction of new shelters and the erection of a new access to platform 2. The state of Rhineland-Palatinate provided a subsidy of about €692,999 for these works.

== Buildings ==
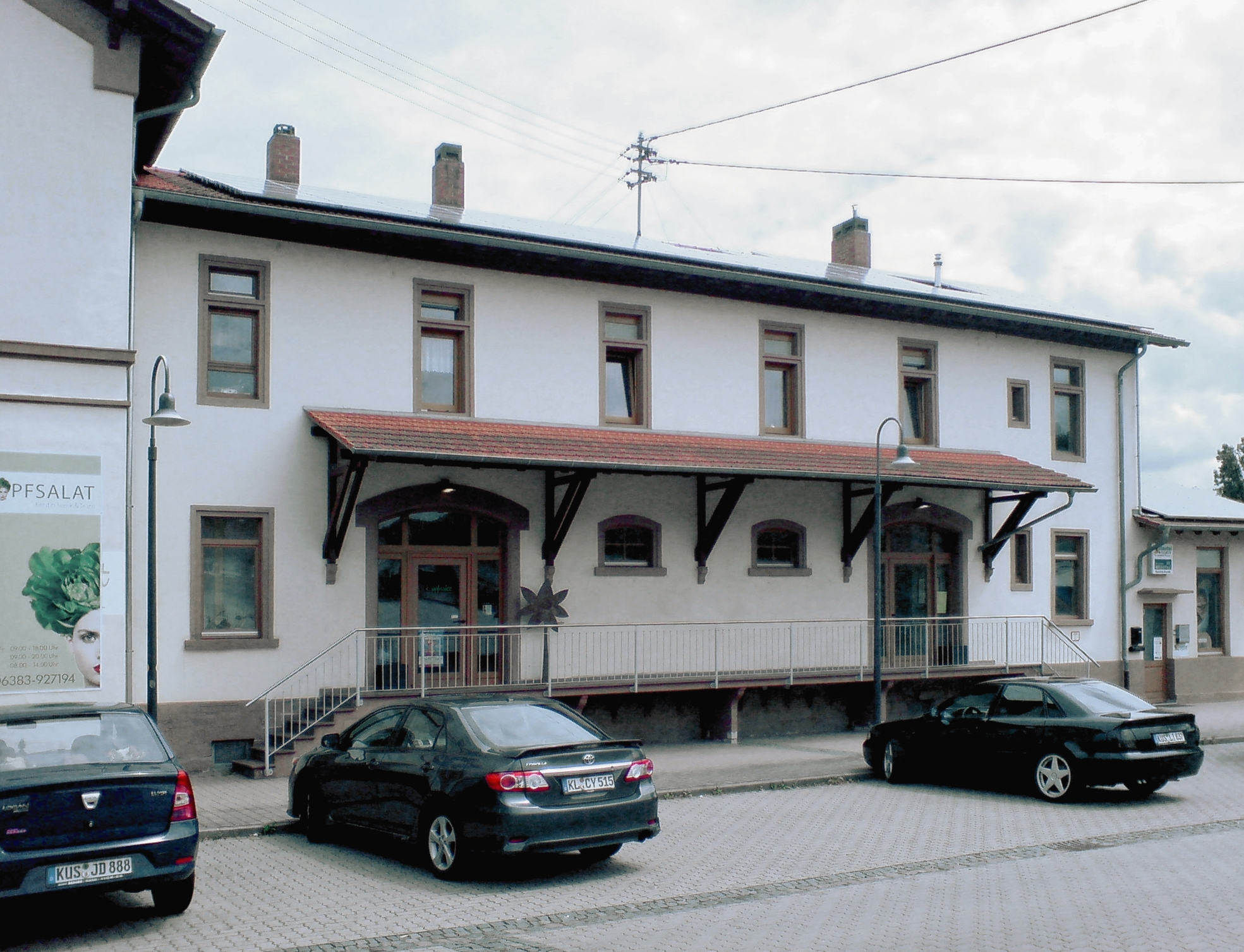
Station annex

The station received a two and a half storey entrance building at its opening, built in the style of the other Palatine stations that were built in the 1860s and 1870s, inspired and equipped accordingly with external plasterwork. In accordance with the importance of the station it has a relatively large gable facing the tracks and the street and corresponded as far as possible the station buildings of Altenglan and Kusel, which were also built at the time of the construction of the line. It has two and a half floors that were originally equipped with rooms for staff accommodation and administrative offices. Directly next to it there was a two-storey goods shed, which was created with the slope of the roof facing the track.

Both the station and the goods shed experienced some structural changes and the latter was also expanded in the coming decades. There was a wooden porch at the western end of the station building, which was pulled down in the 1990s. The station building is no longer used for rail operations. It is, privately owned and has been restored along with its immediate environment.

=== Platforms ===
During its first three and a half decades, the station possessed only a single platform. After the establishment of the Glan Valley Railway, two platforms were added, which were located between tracks 1 and 3. In the 1960s, track 3 was removed and the two newer platforms were replaced by an island platform. Since the closure of the Glan Valley Railway the station has had only two outside platforms, which have been accessible for the disabled since 2004.

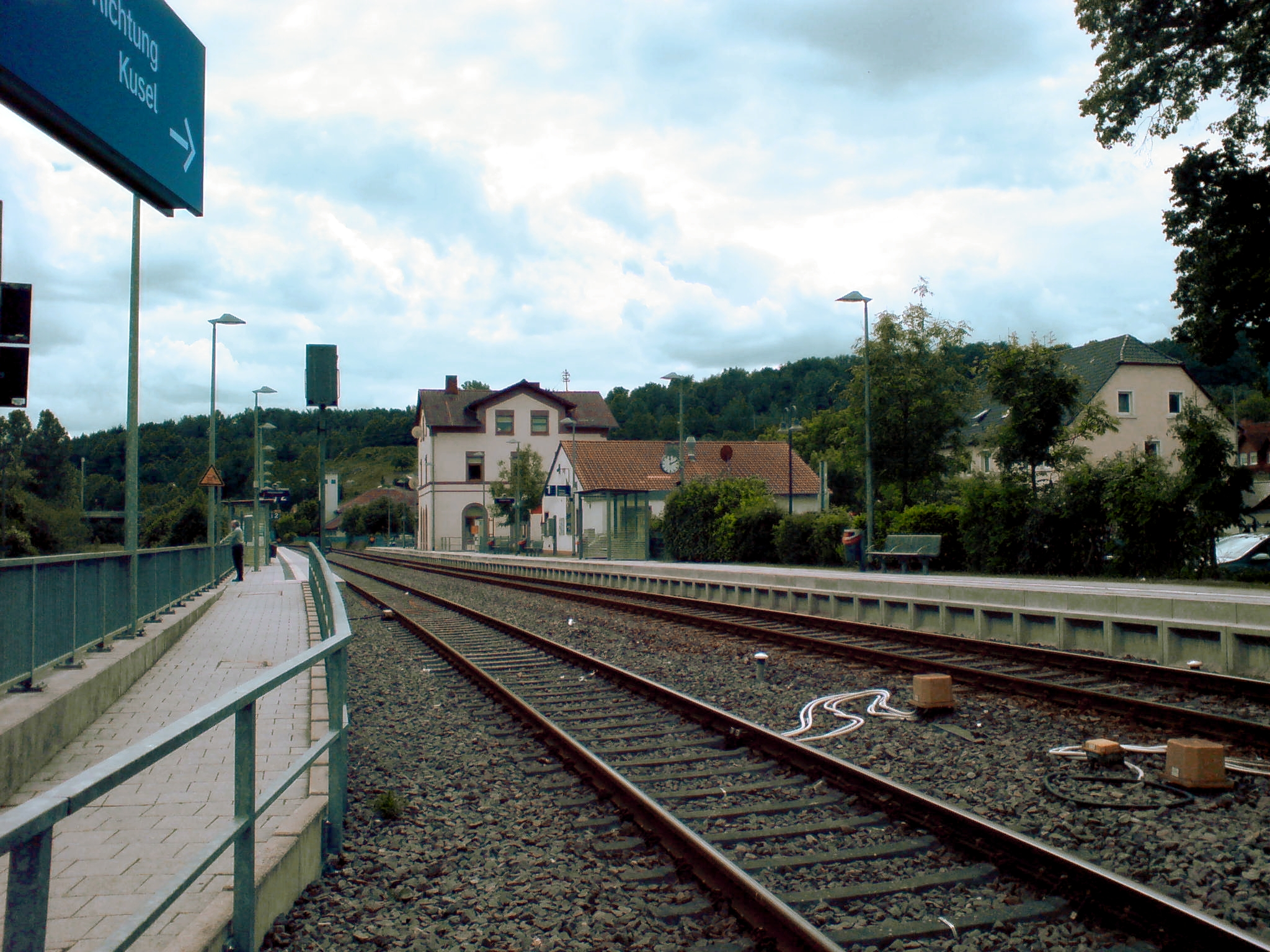
Platforms, station building behind

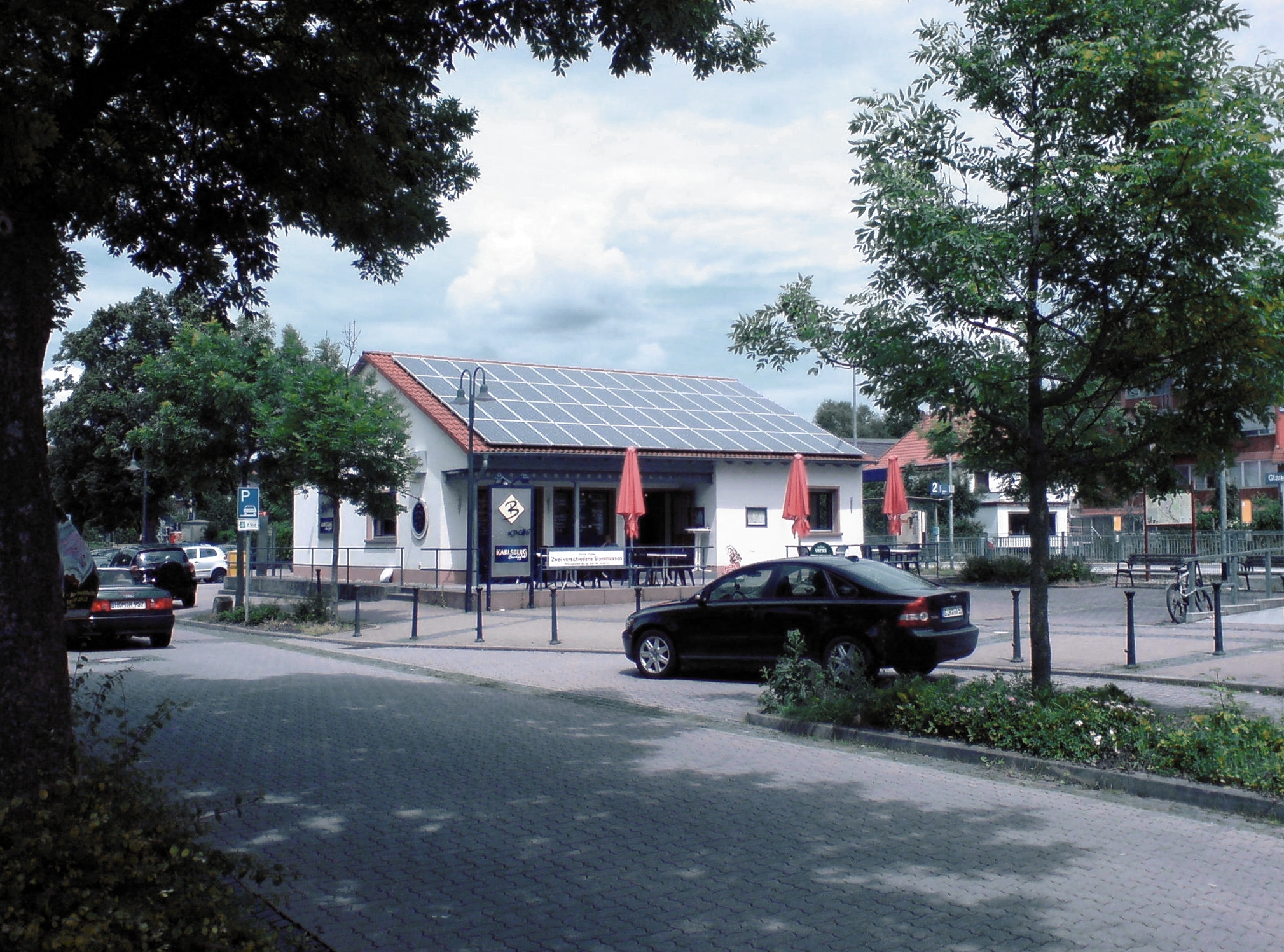
Station area

Platforms
Tracks	Usable length	Platform height	Current use
1	130 m	55 cm	Regionalbahn services towards Kusel
2	130 m	55 cm	Regionalbahn services towards Landstuhl

== Operations ==
=== Passengers ===
From the opening of the Kusel–Landstuhl line, it was operated with two mixed and two ordinary passenger trains. In the first year of the Glan Valley Railway between Homburg and Glan-Munchweiler, it was served by four services towards Bad Münster and four towards Homburg. This included only three pairs of trains from Homburg to Bad Munster; the other pair ran only between Homburg and Altenglan. In 1905, Glan-Münchweiler station sold a total 26,653 tickets.

A few years later services ran between Homburg and Kusel, which mainly served miners commuting from the region around Kusel to the Saar region. With the separation of the current Saarland from Germany after the Second World War, access to the Saarland was prohibited for the common people.

There was a gap of four hours in the services between Altenglan and Glan Munchweiler in the 1909 timetable. This prompted the office of the Kusel district to apply for it be closed. Then, a carriage for third and fourth class passengers was attached to a freight train between Altenglan and Theisbergstegen. Especially in the 1930s, the timetable included several routes that operated over sections of different lines, such as the Homburg–Glan-Münchweiler–Ramstein route.

From the early 1950s, a so-called Städteschnellzug ("city express", a supplement-free express train) ran between Kusel and Heidelberg, stopping in Glan-Münchweiler. In 1954, it was downgraded to a semi-fast train (Eilzug). It was discontinued in 1979.

At the same time, the services were reinforced by Uerdingen railbuses, including sub-class VT 98, which ran until the mid-1970s. After the closure of passenger traffic between Homburg and Glan-Münchweiler, the railbuses also disappeared from the line to Kusel.

In 1965 two pair of express services were established between Zweibrücken and Mainz, running via the Glan Valley Railway and stopping in Glan-Münchweiler. These were operated with diesel locomotives of class V 100.20 hauling so-called Silberling carriages. The initiator of this service was the then mayor of Zweibrücker, Oscar Munzinger, who was also at this time in the parliament of Rhineland-Palatinate and wanted to have a service between his two work places. In the vernacular, these trains were therefore referred to as the "Munzinger Express". Due to the already missing link between Odernheim and Bad Münster these trains had to run to Staudernheim and reverse there to use the Nahe Valley Railway to run to the east. In 1967, there was another pair of services between Homburg and Gau Algesheim. From 1970, these links were officially classified as only regional rapid-transit (Nahschnellverkehrszüge) services and they were terminated in 1979.

==== Current services ====
Since 2006, the station is served hourly by the Glantalbahn (Regionalbahn 67) service and is incorporated in the fare system of the VRN.

Train class	Route	Frequency
RB 67	Kaiserslautern – Landstuhl – Glan-Münchweiler – Altenglan – Kusel	Hourly

=== Freight ===
Unlike at many other stations on the Glan Valley Railway and the line to Kusel, freight transport played a minor role at Glan-Münchweiler. In 1905, a total of 8198.73 tons of goods was received or despatched. In 1969, 75 wagon loads were despatched and 479 wagon loads were received. Especially in the first decades these were mainly loaded with coal from a nearby mine in Steinbach am Glan. In the early days there were mixed freight and passenger trains, so that the movement of freight in the first years was performed using two pairs of mixed trains.

In 1920, a local freight train (Nahgüterzug) ran from Kaiserslautern to Kusel and another ran from Ebernburg freight yard on the Alsenz Valley Railway along the Glan Valley Railway serving all stations between Lauterecken-Grumbach and Homburg. In the 1990s the stations on Landstuhl–Kusel line—apart from Theisbergstegen and Rammelsbach stations, which continued to be served by trains to the nearby quarries—was served only by a freight exchange train (Übergabegüterzug). Glan-Münchweiler station now has no freight operations.

=== Buses ===
There is a bus stop at the station. It is served by the following bus routes:

- 282 (Gimsbach–Matzenbach–Rehweiler–Glan-Münchweiler–Quirnbach–Liebsthal–Sangerhof–Wahnwegen–Herschweiler-Pettersheim–Krottelbach
- 283 (Glan-Wünchweiler–Quirnbach–Henschtal–Steinbach am Glan–Brücken (Pfalz)–Schönenberg-Kübelberg–Waldmohr–Homburg
- 285 (Glan-Wünchweiler–Nanzdietschweiler–Börsborn–Gries (Pfalz)–Schönenberg-Kübelberg–Waldmohr–Homburg.

All lines are operated by Saar-Pfalz-Bus GmbH, a subsidiary of DB.
