= Lauter Valley Railway =

Railway line in Germany

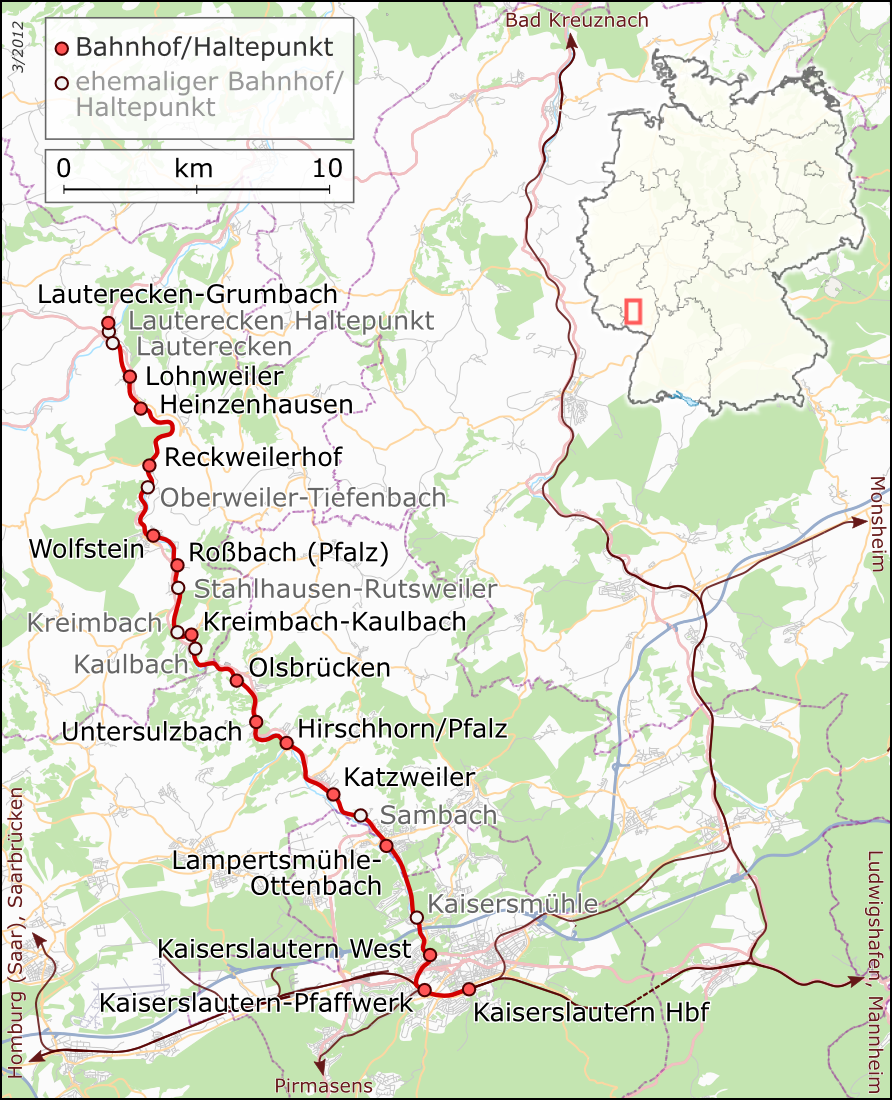

Overview
- Native name: Lautertalbahn
- Line number: 3302
- Locale: Rhineland-Palatinate
- Termini: Kaiserslautern; Lauterecken-Grumbach

Service
- Route number: 673

Technical
- Line length: 34.5 km (21.4 mi)
- Track gauge: 1,435 mm (4 ft 8 1/2 in) standard gauge
- Minimum radius: 185 m (607 ft)
- Maximum incline: 1.4%

The Lauter Valley Railway (German: Lautertalbahn) is a branch line in the German state of Rhineland-Palatinate. It runs from Kaiserslautern along the Lauter river to Lauterecken. The railway, which was opened in 1883, has only regional importance. Deutsche Bundesbahn planned in the 1980s to close the line. Its existence has now been secured since the establishment of Deutsche Bahn. While freight traffic was discontinued in the 1990s, there has been growth in passenger demand.

== History ==
In about 1860, a committee was formed called the Notabeln des Glan- und Lautertales (Notables of the Glan and Lauter valleys), which was based in Wolfstein. It campaigned for a railway line that would branch off from the Palatine Ludwig Railway in Kaiserslautern and continue along the Lauter and the lower Glan valleys, connecting in Staudernheim with the Rhine-Nahe Railway, which was completed in 1860. A concession for the line was granted in the mid-1860s. The committee sent a proposal to the Ludwigshafen-based headquarters of the Palatine Ludwig Railway Company (Pfälzische Ludwigsbahn-Gesellschaft). The project was in competition with the line along the Alsenz. After the opening, in 1870, of the Alsenz Valley Railway (Alsenztalbahn), which at the beginning was seen as a route for long-distance traffic, the probability of a rail link via the Lauter dropped significantly.

A plan for a main line railway was prepared in 1874. The estimated cost of a line along the Lauter including a branch to Otterberg totalled 3.58 million guilders. At first, there was a dispute over the route. For example, the town of Otterberg, which is located outside the Lauter valley, advocated a route through Otterberg. A new petition of the communities on the Lauter in 1877 supported a route along the Lauter. It was decided to build the Lauter Railway as a secondary line and the plan for a branch to Otterberg was postponed.

The Palatine Northern Railway Company (Gesellschaft der Pfälzischen Nordbahnen), which had been part of the Palatinate Railway (Pfalzbahn) since 1870, received a concession for the line on 9 May 1880. The plans were delayed because of disagreements over the route and problems in acquiring the necessary land. On 18 February 1882, work began with a groundbreaking ceremony on the site of today's Kaiserslautern West station. Due to the expected heavy freight traffic at the original Kaiserslautern West station (Westbahnhof), the section to this station was designed as a main line railway, while the remaining section to Lauterecken was designed as a secondary line with lighter trackwork. The railway was not built gradually from the south to the north, but instead it was built relatively simultaneously by different companies. The line opened on 15 November 1883 after a test run had confirmed its capacity for operations as early as 17 September.

=== Further development (1883–1911) ===
In the first decades there was a structural and operational oddity at Kaiserslautern West station: the part handling passenger services was built as a terminal station so that passenger trains to Lauterecken had to reverse into the station. Trains running in the opposite direction had to reverse out the station and run backwards to Kaiserslautern Hauptbahnhof (Hauptbahnhof).

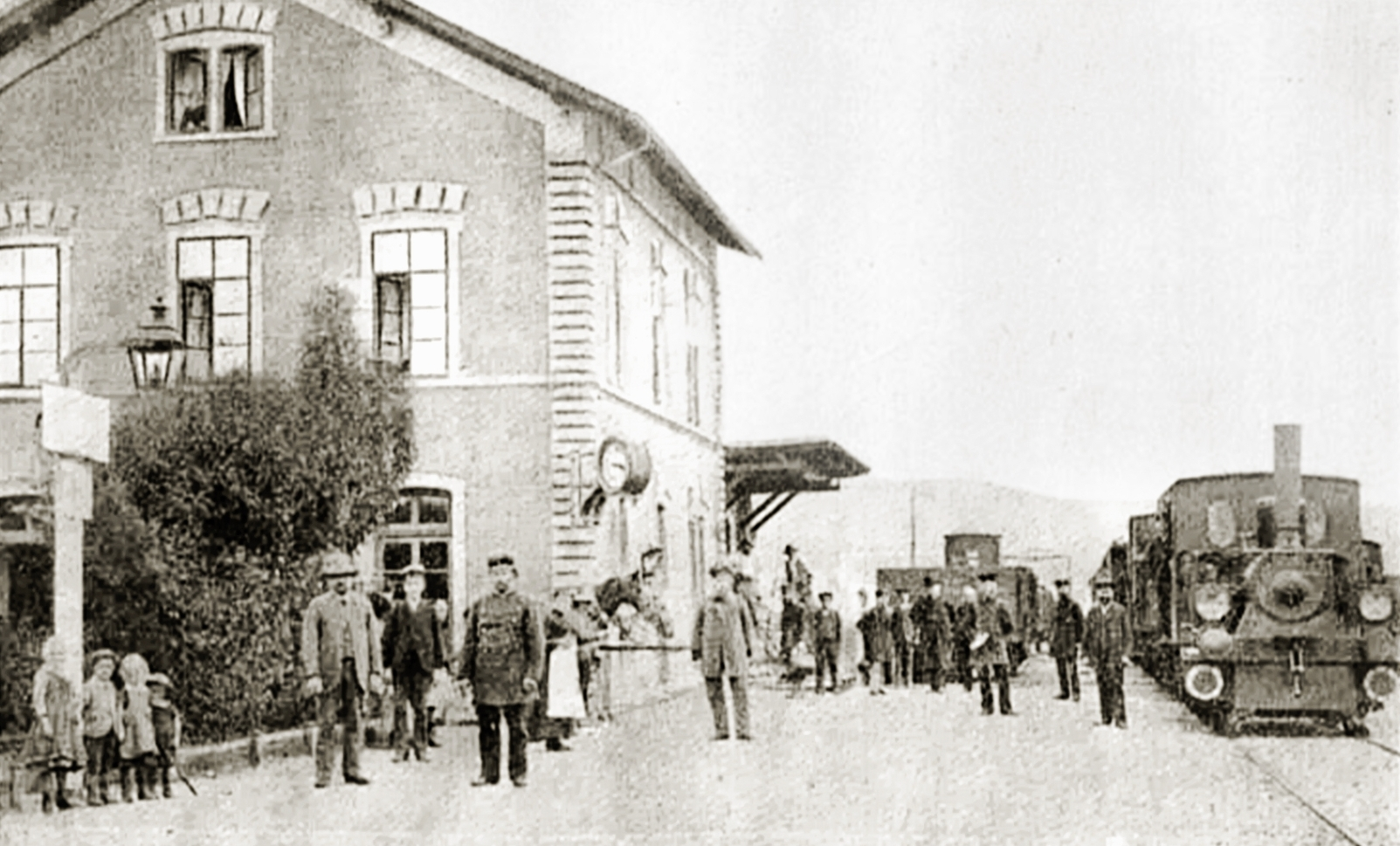
Lampertsmühle-Otterbach station in 1887

In 1895, the superstructure of the Lauter Valley Railway was reinforced to adapt to the requirements for the operation of freight trains because of the construction of the lower Glan Valley Railway from Lauterecken. The Lauterecken–Odernheim line opened in 1896 was the direct continuation of the Lauter Valley Railway. To the north of the original terminus at Lauterecken an additional halt (Haltepunkt) was built in the district of Veldenzstadt to give access for the residents at the northern edge of the town and to the central Glan valley. From 1897, it was connected to the Rhine-Nahe Railway at Staudernheim.

In order to link the Altenglan–Lauterecken section of the Glan Valley Railway opened in 1904, Lauterecken-Grumbach station was opened at the junction in the same year as an interchange station. Otherwise, it would have been necessary to build the Glan Valley Railway on a more complex and expensive route through Lauterecken. Until the completion of Glan Valley Railway in 1904, there were through trains from Kaiserslautern to Staudernheim. The former Lauterecken station was then reduced to the status of a halt and the Lauterecken halt opened in 1896 just to the south of the junction was closed.

On 1 January 1909, the Lauter Valley Railway, along with the other railway lines within the Palatinate, was taken over by the Royal Bavarian State Railways. In 1912, the stations of Kaisersmühle, Sambach, Oberweiler-Tiefenbach and Lauterecken were abandoned for lack of profitability. By May 1912, the barriers had been removed at 42 level crossings, as a result of rationalisation. Two years later, Stahlhausen-Rutsweiler station also had to be closed because of low usage.

=== World wars and the interwar period (1911–1949) ===
The opening of the branch to Otterbach in 1911, and the Bach Railway (Bachbahn, so called because all of its stations had names ending in “bach”, i.e. “brook”) to Weilerbach, which was extended in 1920 to Reichenbach, gave the Lauter Valley Railway greater importance, especially its southern stretch, since the passenger trains on either route often continued to Kaiserslautern. On 1 November 1917, during the First World War, the intermediate stops in Kaulbach and Lohnweiler were closed. Eleven months later, however, they were reactivated. In 1920, the line became part of the newly founded Deutsche Reichsbahn.

In 1922, there were plans for the stations in Kaulbach, Lohnweiler and Rossbach-Stahlhausen to close due to low use, but local protests prevented this. In 1923 and 1924, so-called Regiebetrieb ("directed operation" of the railways by the Allied military during the Occupation of the Ruhr) was imposed under the control of France, which had occupied the Palatinate. The local population boycotted the railway during the occupation. Therefore, reinforced German Post Office bus routes and private trucks were used as an alternative to the French-controlled railways. In addition, the German Ministry of Transport refused to cooperate with the occupiers in the operation of the railway, so the French took rail operations into their own hands. Since the military officers involved did not fully understand the German operating instructions and the safe-working systems, railway operation during this time were hazardous. The time required to travel over the whole Lauter Valley Railway at that time was almost two hours.

The Reichsbahndirektion (railway division of) Ludwigshafen founded in 1922, to which the Lauter Valley Railway had belonged, was dissolved in 1936. Apart from Lauterecken-Grumbach station, which henceforth belonged to the Reichsbahndirektion Mainz, along with the adjacent northern Glan Valley Railway, the line came under the control of the Reichsbahndirektion Saarbrücken.

Since the timetable could often not be met during the Second World War, a "list of essential services" appeared in 1941. Therefore, at least three trains had to run between Kaiserslautern and Lauterecken. In December 1944, Lauterecken-Grumbach station, due to its function as a railway junction, was the victim of a series of air raids, which among other things burnt down the roundhouse. In March 1945, there was another air raid.

=== Deutsche Bundesbahn (1949–1993) ===
After the Second World War Deutsche Bundesbahn (DB) took over operations on the line and incorporated them into the railway division of Mainz. The latter received those sections controlled by the former railway division of Saarbrücken that were located within the newly created federal state of Rhineland-Palatinate. In 1951 a new station called Kaiserslautern-Pfaffwerk was opened at the Pfaff factory between the Kaiserslautern Hauptbahnhof and Kaiserslautern West station. As part of the dissolution of the railway division of Mainz in 1971, the line was transferred to the control of the railway division of Saarbrücken again. Sunday traffic was abandoned on the Lauter Valley Railway and replaced by buses in 1975. The operation of steam locomotives on the line ended on 26 September 1975. In 1983, the Lauter Valley Railway celebrated its 100th anniversary with a Trans Europ Express service between Kaiserslautern and Lauterecken.

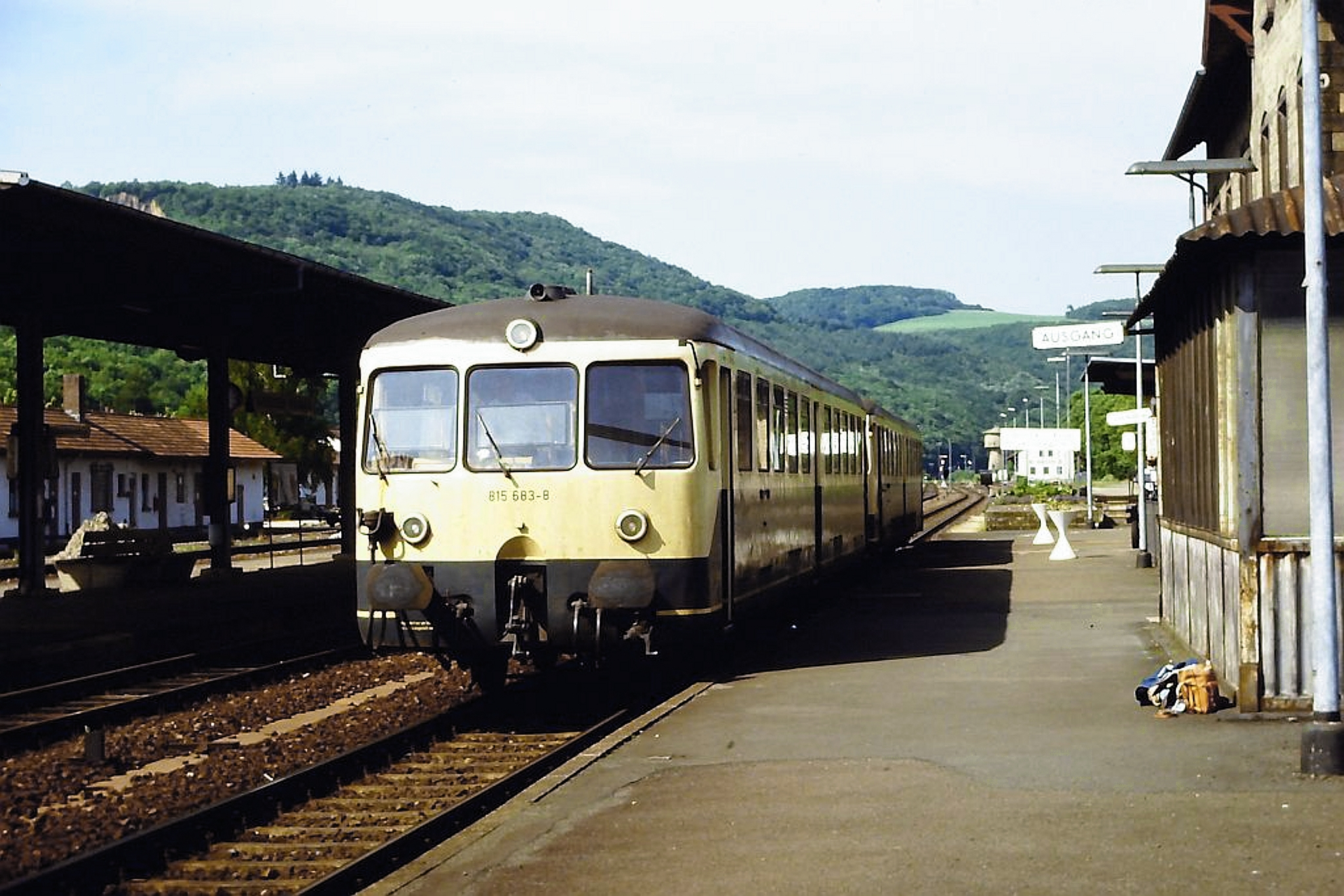
Battery electric multiple unit DB Class ETA 150 in Lauterecken-Grumbach station in 1986

Since the 1950s, passenger services have been abandoned on several adjacent lines in the western North Palatine Uplands—including the Lampertsmühle-Otterbach–Otterberg branch line (1954) and the line to Reichenbach (1972)—and the closure of the Lauter Valley Railway was also under discussion. This intention was expressed mainly by the railway division of Saarbrücken, which also gradually ended services on the adjacent Glan Valley Railway at the same time. After passenger services were discontinued on the northern section of the Glan Valley Railway from Lauterecken-Grumbach to Staudernheim in 1986, the Lauter Valley Railway and the Landstuhl–Kusel railway were the only lines that were spared from the wave of closure of branch lines in the region. On 9 June 1986, Deutsche Bundesbahn and Rhineland-Palatinate entered into an agreement, which divided all the railway lines in the state into three categories. This allowed the efficiency of the Lauter Valley Railway to be verified. In the following years the Lauter Valley Railway was threatened with closure, but the public and local politicians managed to preserve the line.

In 1969, Deutsche Bundesbahn ended passenger services at Kaiserslautern West station and replaced it with a new station of the same name. This is right at the junction of the spur to the original terminus. In the late 1980s, the terminus was closed as a freight yard, but for several years it still operated as a siding.

In 1991, plans were developed to allow the Lauter Valley Railway to run within Kaiserslautern as a "City Railway" (Citybahn). The trains from the West Station would operate on a route through the city centre to terminate near the town hall at a newly built "City Station” (Citybahnhof). There would also have been a branch from the Lauter Valley Railway to return passenger services to Weilerbach. However, financial constraints and a lack of political support prevented the implementation of these plans.

=== Deutsche Bahn (since 1994) ===
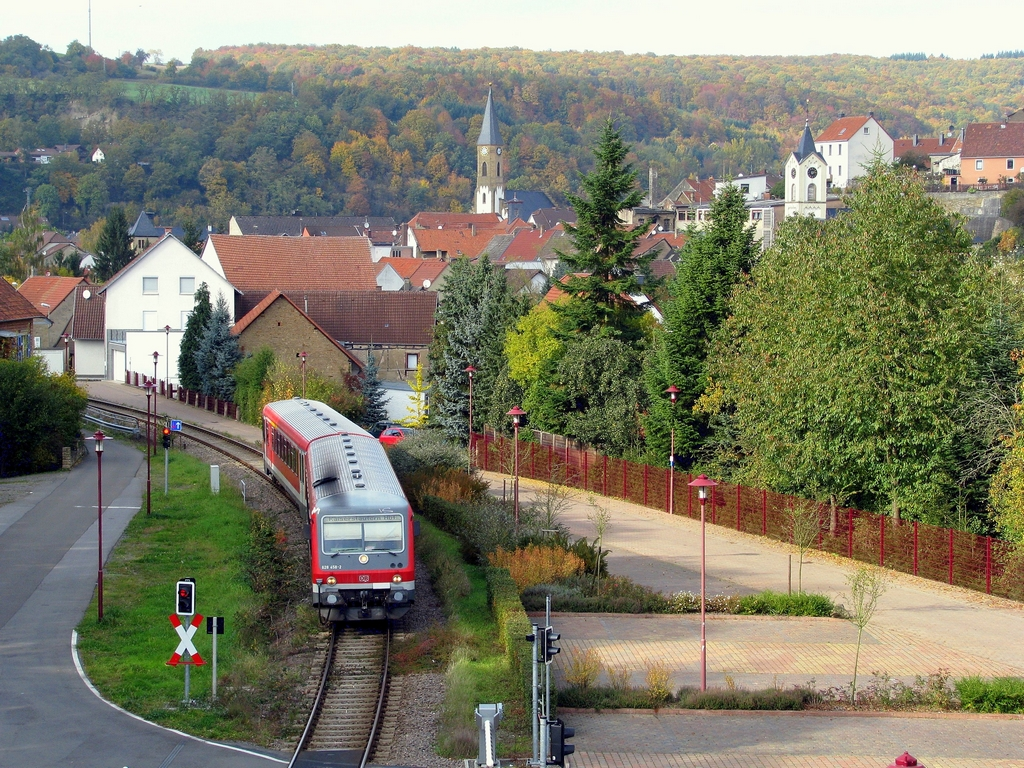
628 458 in Lauterecken

On 1 January 1994, the German railway reform came into force and ownership of the line was transferred from Deutsche Bundesbahn to Deutsche Bahn AG. As the states were now responsible for local transport, the line was no longer under the threat of closure. On 20 August 1995, the first "car-free day in the Lauter valley" (Autofreies Lautertal) was celebrated with the reintroduction of Sunday services. The trains were very busy that day.

In 2000, the Lauter Valley Railway, along with the entire Western Palatinate, was initially part of the Westpfalz-Verkehrsverbundes (Western Palatinate Transport Association, WVV), but six years later this was absorbed by the Verkehrsverbund Rhein-Neckar (Rhine-Neckar Transport Association, VRN). In the same year, the Kreimbach-Kaulbach station was opened, replacing the existing stations in Kreimbach and Kaulbach. Also in 2005, the platforms at the stations of Olsbrücken, Lampertsmühle-Otterbach, Heinzenhausen and Wolfenstein were upgraded to make them accessible for the disabled.

At the same time Deutsche Bahn, carried out a pilot project to install a system for controlling train operations by radio, but was unsuccessful. In the period from 16 to 18 December 2005, the previous mechanical interlocking technology on the Lauter Valley Railway, which had been used for over 100 years, was replaced by an electronic interlocking technology of the "Bruchsal G" type, which had originally been planned to be installed in the autumn of the previous year. Since then the railway facilities have been controlled by an electronic interlocking at Neustadt an der Weinstraße. This has reduced costs on the line.

== Route ==
The route follows the entire length of the Lauter river. Shortly before Kaiserslautern West, it runs through a cutting and then passes under the Lauter viaduct of Autobahn 6. The only tunnel along the line is the 91 metre-long Eisenknopf Tunnel in Wolfenstein. Shortly before reaching the terminus at Lauterecken-Grumbach, the line crosses a bridge over the Glan.

First, the line runs through the city of Kaiserslautern, from Lampertsmühle-Otterbach to Olsbrücken it runs through the district of Kaiserslautern. The rest of the line is located in the district of Kusel.

== Operations ==
=== Passengers ===
At the time beginning of operations, three pairs of trains services ran between Kaiserslautern and Lauterecken. In 1896, services were extended with the opening of the lower Glan Valley Railway to Odernheim and its extension to Staudernheim in 1897. Continuous services from the Lauter Valley Railway to Staudernheim ended with the opening of the remaining sections of the Glan Valley Railway in 1904. From 1906, some trains ran only on part of the line, such as between Lauterecken and Wolfenstein, between Kaiserslautern and Olsbrücken and between Kaiserslautern West and Lampertsmühle-Otterbach. After the Bach Railway and the line to Otterberg were opened for passengers, their trains ran mostly to Kaiserslautern, so the Kaiserslautern–Lampertsmühle-Otterbach section had increased traffic. From 1966 to 1969, two daily express trains ran towards Kaiserslautern. Sunday services ended in 1975 and Saturday services ended seven years later. Sunday services were restored in 1995.

Mostly trains ran via Lauterecken to the lower Glan Valley Railway. Thus, the summer timetable of 1971 included two pairs of trains on the line bound for Staudernheim or Meisenheim.

The line is listed in the Deutsche Bahn time table as route number (KBS) 673 and as Regionalbahn line 66 of the Verkehrsverbund Rhein-Neckar (Rhine-Neckar Transport Association, VRN) network. In 2000, during the State Garden Show in Kaiserslautern, the Karlsruhe–Kaiserslautern Regional-Express service was extended to Lampertsmühle-Otterbach to cope with the number of visitors.

Train crossings took place in Lampertsmühle and Wolfstein until 2008. Since the timetable change in December 2008, trains no longer cross at these stations, but instead cross mainly at Olsbrücken station. Thus, the average travel time was shortened by six minutes, but there is now a shorter guaranteed time to transfer to and from Rhine-Neckar S-Bahn services in Kaiserslautern.

=== Freight ===
Freight always had a minor role on the line. The Lauter Valley Railway had a greater role in freight only during the two world wars. In the first years of its existence, there were no separate freight trains, but instead there were mixed trains at most.
