= Lauterecken-Grumbach station =

Railway station in Lauterecken, Germany

Lauterecken-Grumbach
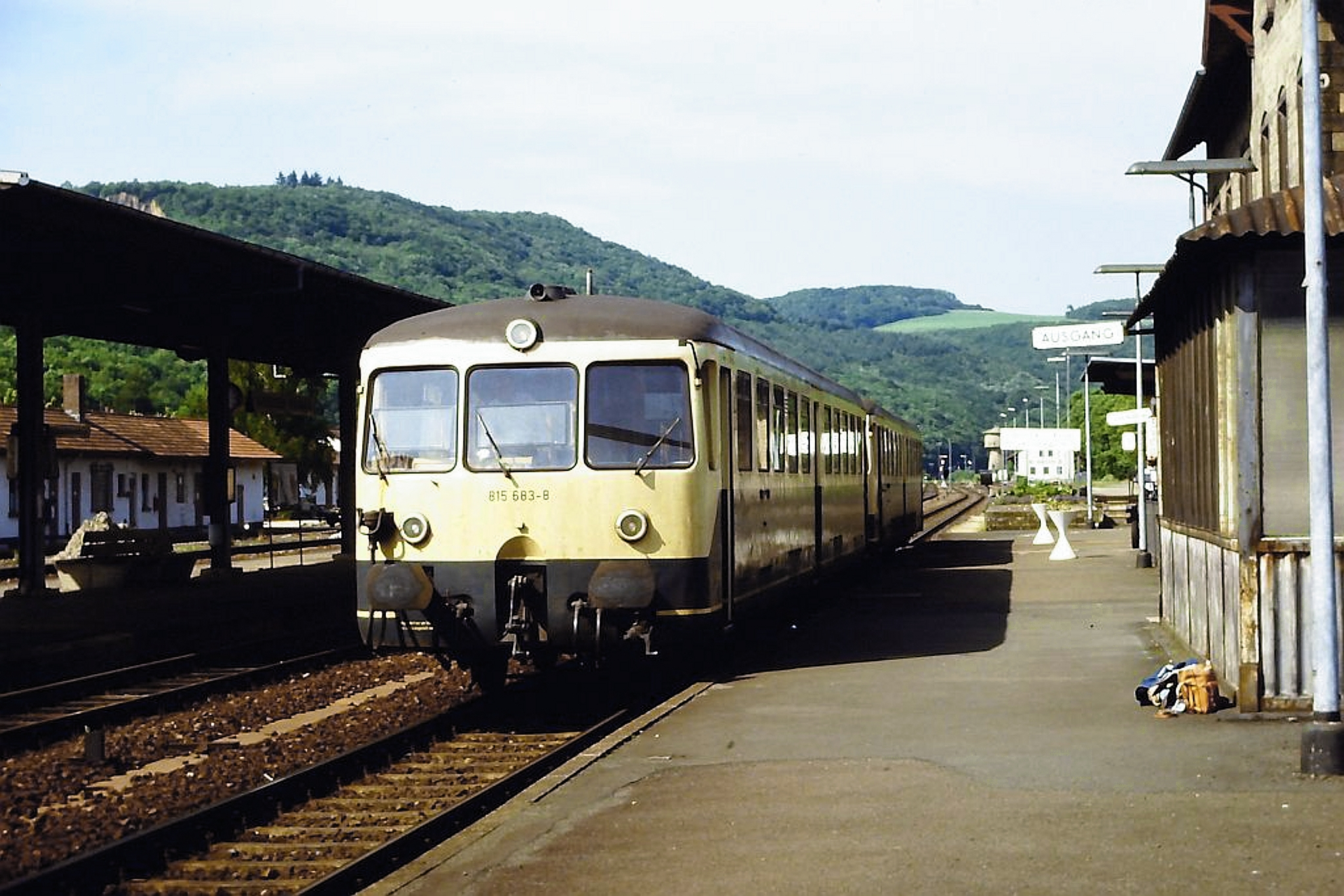
- Battery multiple unit of classes 515 and 815 in Lauterecken-Grumbach station (1986)

General information
- Location: Bahnhofstr. 1, Lauterecken, Rhineland-Palatinate; Germany
- Coordinates: 49°39′14″N 7°35′27″E
- Lines: Lauter Valley Railway (34.5); Glan Valley Railway (75.2 km) (closed)
- Platforms: 2

Construction
- Accessible: Yes

Other information
- Station code: 3605
- DS100 code: SLKG
- IBNR: 8000547
- Category: 6
- Fare zone: VRN: 793
- Website: www.bahnhof.de

History
- Opened: 1 May 1904

Services
Preceding station	DB Regio Mitte	Following station
Terminus	RB 66	Lohnweiler towards Kaiserslautern Hbf
Location

Lauterecken-Grumbach station is a railway station in the town of Lauterecken in the German state of Rhineland-Palatinate. It is classified by Deutsche Bahn as a category 6 station and has two platform tracks. The station is located in the network area of the Verkehrsverbund Rhein-Neckar (Rhine-Neckar Transport Association, VRN) and it is in fare zone 793. Its address is Bahnhofstraße 1.

The station's name reflects the fact that the station also originally served Grumbach, which is a few kilometres away. It was opened on 1 May 1904 as a junction station on the Glan Valley Railway (Glantalbahn), which was completed on the same day over its full-length from Homburg to Bad Münster, and the Lauter Valley Railway, which starts in Kaiserslautern and was opened in 1883. The Glan Valley Railway was shut down gradually around Lauterecken from the mid-1980s, and since then the station has only been the terminus of the Lauter Valley Railway. Since 2000, it has been a station on the draisine operation on the former Glan Valley Railway between Altenglan and Staudernheim.

== Location ==
The station is located on the northwestern outskirts of Lauterecken. It has parking, a bus stop and toilets. Barrier-free access is only partially available.

=== Railway lines ===
The now disused Glan Valley Railway ran through only on the northwestern edge the town of Lauterecken. The still operational Lauter Valley Railway passes by the south-eastern suburbs, which it bypasses in an arc to Lauterecken-Grumbach station, where it formerly connected with the Glan Valley Railway.

== History ==
At the opening of the Lauter Valley Railway in 1883, a station was opened on the southwestern outskirts of Lauterecken. When choosing its location, care was taken that it was feasible to build a connecting line to the already proposed Glan Valley Railway.

The station remained well-situated after the opening of the northern section of the line later called the Glan Valley Railway to Odernheim in 1896, as a direct extension of the Lauter Valley Railway. In the same year Lauterecken halt (Haltepunkt Lauterecken) was built as a request stop between Friedhofsweg and the current federal highway 270 to improve access to northern Lauterecken and the surrounding communities. It had a small building to serve passenger services and operations.

=== Creation of Lauterecken-Grumbach station ===
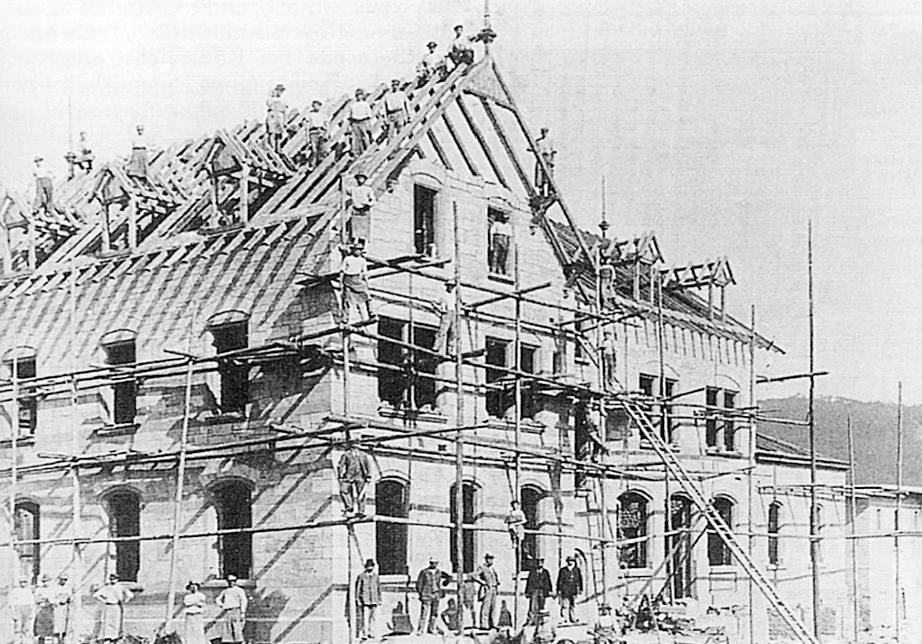
Entrance building of Lauterecken-Grumbach station during the construction phase

During the planning of the remainder of the Glan Valley Railway between Altenglan and Homburg, however, it turned out that Lauterecken station was poorly located for a junction of the two lines. It was decided that the new station at the junction of the Lauter and the Glan line would be called Lauterecken-Grumbach and lie on the north-western outskirts just 200 metres north of Lauterecken halt, which had opened in 1896. Its construction proved to be very costly. The station's railway yards were very long, covering a whole kilometre and its embankment had to be built two metres high due to the high risk of flooding from the adjacent Glan. A total of 250,000 cubic metres of material was obtained from nearby quarries. In the northern area, it received a two road roundhouse, a turntable, with a diameter of about 16 metres, a water tower including a water crane, a coaling point, an inspection pit and overnight accommodation for railway staff.

The superstructure was largely completed on 21 January 1904 and a test run was held on 25 March between Homburg and Lauterecken-Grumbach. The new station was finally put into operation with the opening of the entire Glan Valley Railway from Homburg to Bad Munster on 1 May 1904. The new line had a total of 26 stations. The country town of Lauterecken, which then had approximately 2000 inhabitants, briefly had three stations, but Lauterecken halt was soon closed. The former Lauterecken station lost its original function and was demoted to the status of a halt and then abandoned due to lack of profitability in 1912.

=== Developments up to the Second World War (1913–1945) ===
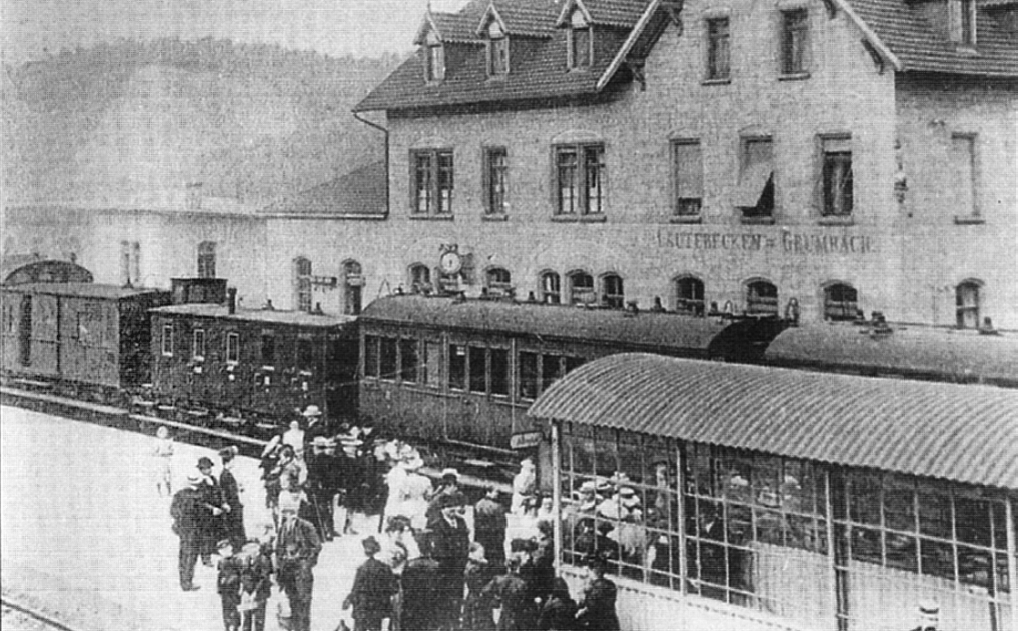
Station in 1910

In 1913 a wooden hut was built between the signal box and the track supervisor's office (Bahnmeisterei). A year later, at the outbreak of the First World War, the military authorities operated troop trains over the line every 90 minutes. It was said that a lavatory with a capacity for 100 people had been built behind the hut for this operation.

After the First World War, the southern part of the Glan Valley Railway between Homburg and Jägersburg became part of the Saar, which was controlled by the United Kingdom and France. To adjust to the establishment of the Saar Railway (Saareisenbahn), the new Deutsche Reichsbahn had to operate trains to Homburg. For this purpose, it was necessary to accommodate two more locomotives at Lauterecken. This led to plans to expand the roundhouse, which, however, were not realized.

The Reichsbahndirektion (railway division of) Ludwigshafen founded in 1922, to which the station had belonged, was dissolved in 1937. In contrast to the rest of the Lauter Valley Railway, which was allocated to the Reichsbahndirektion Saarbrücken, it, together with the section of the Glan Valley Railway that was north of Altenglan, was allocated to the Reichsbahndirektion Mainz. Between 24 and 27 September 1938 a military exercise was held in the Palatinate. Troop trains from Frankfurt were despatched to stations including Lauterecken-Grumbach.

In the period between 6 and 31 December 1944, several air raids were made on the station. All the tracks in the vicinity of the No 2 signal box were destroyed. The locomotive shed was burnt and was not repaired in the following period; only the accommodation for train drivers was put back into operation after the war. In March of the following year there was another heavy air raid on the station, which also affected several houses of the town.

=== Deutsche Bundesbahn (1945–1993) ===
The locomotive depot was closed on 1 October 1948. In the late 1970s, the Lauterecken track supervisor's office, which for decades had been in charge of the maintenance of the Glan Valley Railway and the Lauter Valley Railway near the town, was closed. In 1983, the Lauter Valley Railway celebrated its centenary and for this purpose a Trans Europ Express (TEE) service ran between Kaiserslautern and Lauterecken-Grumbach.

After the Homburg Glan Munchweiler section (1981) and the Altenglan-Lauterecken-Grumbach section (1985) of the Glan Valley Railway were closed for passenger services, the line between Glan-Münchweiler and Odernheim was officially downgraded to a branch line on 29 September 1985. As goods operations between Ulmet and Offenbach-Hundheim had previously disappeared, there were now no regular operations south of Offenbach-Hundheim and some years later freight operations in the Lauterecken area also ended. Between Lauterecken-Grumbach and Staudernheim passenger services were closed on 30 May 1986. The last train arrived late at the station at 18:38. As Meisenheim and Odernheim were the only stations that handled freight on this section and the former was approached from the south, the section between Meisenheim and Odernheim subsequently also had no regular traffic.

As a result, the Lauter Valley Railway and the Kusel–Landstuhl railway were the only lines in the region that were spared from the wave of branch line closures in the region. On 9 June 1986, Deutsche Bundesbahn and the state of Rhineland-Palatinate came to an agreement, which divided all the railway lines in the state into three categories. While the costs of operating the Lauter Valley Railway could still be addressed, there was now no question of discontinuing passenger services between Landstuhl and Kusel.

In 1992, the closure process for the Altenglan–Lauterecken section was initiated, but this was affected by the conversion of Deutsche Bundesbahn into Deutsche Bahn on 31 December 1993. On 6 July 1993, a weed-spraying made the last run over the section. On 27 February 1993, the operation of freight to Meisenheim also ended.

=== Deutsche Bahn and the opening of the Draisine line (since 1994) ===
In the 1990s, the station was the only one on the Lauter Valley Railway that had a platform canopy. During the same decade, the “home” platform was renovated and raised to 55 cm.

The Altenglan–Lauterecken-Grumbach section of the Glan Valley Railway was closed at the turn of 1995/1996. On 10 May 1996, the Federal Railway Authority also approved the closure of the northern section of the Glan Valley Railway to Staudernheim, which came into force on 1 July 1996.

Meanwhile, a report was prepared which concluded that the reactivation of the Lauterecken–Staudernheim section of the Glan Valley Railway was economically viable, but it was not realised for financial reasons. Students of the Kaiserslautern University of Technology proposed the establishment of a draisine operation on the Altenglan–Staudernhein section of the line to prevent its final closure and the dismantling of its track. The supporters of this project included a councillor of Kusel district, Winfried Hirschberg. It was implemented in 2000. Since 2000 Lauterecken-Grumbach station is, along with Altenglan and Staudernheim, one of three stations offering draisine rides on the Glan line.

In January 2001, the redesigned station forecourt was inaugurated, which was already used for the operation of regional bus routes. In the period from 16 to 18 December 2005, the signal box, which had previously been operated with mechanical interlocking technology for over 100 years, was replaced by an electronic interlocking technology of the “Bruchsal G” type. Since then the railway facilities have been controlled by an electronic interlocking at Neustadt an der Weinstraße. The signal box at Lauterecken was taken out of service at this time.

== Infrastructure ==
=== Entrance building ===
Lauterecken-Grumbach station received a bigger entrance building than most other stations on the strategic railway because of its importance for rail traffic. Like most of station buildings along the Glan Valley Railway, the building is built of sandstone, as was typical for the Palatine Northern Railway Company (Gesellschaft der Pfälzischen Nordbahnen). It has a rectangular plan. It was built partly with eaves and partly with gables facing the tracks and the street.

The main building has a roof that was built as a false cross. There is an extension, which originally consisted of only one storey with a one-sided hip roof on the north side. To accommodate drivers, the building was expanded with an extension, in keeping with the architecture of the rest of the building. The roof has several small dormer windows, which were decorated with wood.

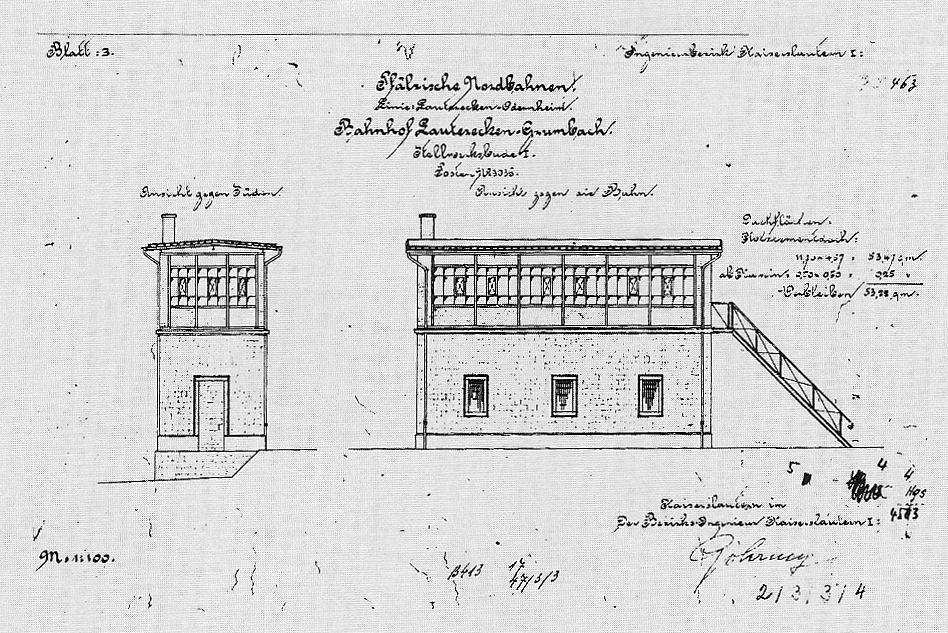
Signal box at Lauterecken-Grumbach station

=== Signal boxes ===
The station also had two Signal boxes, one of which still exists and is protected as a monument. It is built of ashlar with three portals on the long sides. Its floor is made of bricks and it has iron rooms. In addition, it had a clamping room (Spannwerk) in the basement to ensure correct tensions on the interlocking cables.

=== Water tower ===
The northern part of the station yard had a water tower, which was constructed of steel and was equipped with a casing of concrete. It was demolished in 1989, provoking criticism. Originally, there was another water tower, built of steel, between the junction of the Glan and Lauter Valley Railways. During World War II, it was often a target for allied aircraft and was damaged. Nevertheless, it continued to be used during this time, especially in the summer by children as a kind of shower after air raids.

=== Platforms ===
Platforms
Platform	Usable length	Platform height	Current use
1	111 m	55 cm	Regionalbahn services toward Kaiserslautern
2	147 m	26 cm	Not used in scheduled services

=== Other buildings ===
Already at the time of its creation it was decided to build a two road roundhouse in the northern part of the station yard. It was built in the style of most entrance buildings on the Glan Valley Railway. In front of it there was a turntable and directly next to it there was an annex that accommodated railway employees at night. The latter was equipped with eight bedrooms, a lounge, a laundry room and two toilets. There was also an outside toilet.

In the early 1980s, a charging station for Class ETA 150 battery railcars was built in Lauterecken-Grumach. The latter operated on the lines to Lauterecken but only until the end of the decade.

== Services ==
=== Long-distance services ===
Neither the Lauter Valley Railway nor the Glan Valley Railway were ever used to an appreciable extent by long-distance services. In 1945 and 1946, a pair of express services ran between Saarbrücken and Koblenz, with only limited access for civilian traffic. This was also the last continuous service over the Glan Valley Railway, including the Odernheim–Bad Münster am Stein section, which was closed in the early 1960s; this train stopped in Altenglan and Lauterecken-Grumbach.

=== Local services ===
At the time of its opening in 1904, six pairs of trains operated on the Glan Valley Railway. In the following decades, there was hardly any through traffic between Homburg and Staudernhem or Bad Münster; instead parts of the line were served, such as Altenglan–Lauterecken-Grumbach or Lauterecken-Grumbach–Staudernheim. From 1904 to 1934, there were between four and six pairs of trains on the Lauter Valley Railway each day. In 1906, there were additional services between Lauterecken and Wolfenstein. Especially in the 1930s, the timetable included several routes that operated over sections of different lines, such as the Kaiserslautern–Lauterecken-Grumbach–Altenglan–Kusel route. In 1905, a total of 32,966 tickets were sold at the station at Lauterecken-Grumbach station. In 1934 the number rose to 41,215.

In 1965, two train pairs were established between Zweibrücken and Mainz, running on the Glan Valley Railway and stopping in Lauterecken-Grumbach. The initiator of this service was the then mayor of Zweibrücker, Oscar Munzinger, who was also at this time in the parliament of Rhineland-Palatinate and wanted to have a service between his two work places. In the vernacular, these trains were therefore referred to as the "Munzinger Express". Due to the already missing link between Odernheim and Bad Münster these trains had to run to Staudernheim and reverse there to use the Nahe Valley Railway to run to the east. In 1967, there was another pair of services between Homburg and Gau Algesheim. From 1970, these links were officially classified as only regional rapid-transit (Nahschnellverkehrszüge) services and they were closed in 1979.

Currently Regionalbahn services (RB66) operate to Kaiserslautern hourly.

=== Freight ===
In 1920, the station was served by a local freight train (Nahgüterzug) from Ebernburg on the Alsenz Valley Railway that stopped at the stations between Bad Münster and Lauterecken-Grumbach and then ran without stopping to Homburg. Another local freight trains was responsible for serving stations between Lauterecken-Grumbach and Homburg. If necessary, another through freight train ran from Homburg to Lauterecken-Grumbach. In Odernheim there was a siding to the local oil mill, which was served by a freight exchange train (Übergabegüterzug). After freight traffic on the Glan Valley Railway was significantly reduced after the Second World War, the sections with freight traffic were served by a freight exchange train.

The numerous quarries in the immediate vicinity of the station had a great importance for freight traffic. So there was, for example, towards Wiesweiler a loading point for the Holzer quarry, which was connected to the actual quarry by a light railway with a gauge of 600 millimetres. North of the station there was a siding owned by the Holzmann quarry, which originally ended shortly after crossing a road that is now part of Federal Highway 420. After a cable car was built from the two quarries, the siding was shortened since, from then on, loading took place between the railway and the road. Several important buildings were built from materials excavated in the quarries, such as the headquarters of the railway division of Ludwigshafen, the Frankfurt Opera and parts of the Reichstag building in Berlin.

From 12 December 1948, freight trains transported gravel from nearby quarries to France. The trains began in Kirn on the Nahe Valley Railway and ran on the Glan Valley Railway to Sarreguemines, with wagons being attached in Lauterecken-Grumbach station. The building material supplier, Bahn-Schneider, also owned a siding, which has not been used since about 1990. Textilwerk Lauterecken (textile factory) founded in 1949 built two sidings in 1950. Around 400 tons of cotton was shipped to it from Bremen each month, although it despatched very little by rail. The last freight train to a customer in Lauterecken ran on 31 March 1993.

A total of 70,357.92 tons of freight was received or despatched in 1905. After the Second World War, however, a significant decline in freight traffic in Lauterecken-Grumbach was recorded. In 1972, it received 9,823 tons and despatched 1,156 tons; these amounts were reduced ten years later to 8,092 and 398 tons.

=== Buses ===
For many decades, there has been a bus stop on the station forecourt.

It is served by the following bus routes:

- 266 (Lauterecken–Wiesweiler–Offenbach am Glan–Glanbrücken–Obereisenbach–Kirrweiler–Homberg–Unterjeckenbach–Herren-Sulzbach–Grumbach/Deimberg–Buborn–Hausweiler
- 268 Offenbach am Glan–Wiesweiler–Lauterecken–Medard/Cronenberg–Ginsweiler–Reipoltskirchen–Nußbach–Adenbach–Odenbach–Meisenheim–Bad Sobernheim
- 270 (Kusel–Rammelsbach–Altenglan–Patersbach–Bedesbach–Erdesbach–Ulmet–Rathsweiler–Niederalben–Eschenau–Sankt Julian–Glanbrücken–Offenbach am Glan–Wiesweiler–Lauterecken),
- 271 (Kusel–Rammelsbach–Altenglan–Patersbach–Erdesbach–Ulmet–Rathsweiler–Niederalben–Eschenau–Sankt Julian–Gumbsweiler–Glanbrücken–Offenbach am Glan–Wiesweiler–Lauterecken).

All lines are operated by Saar-Pfalz-Bus GmbH, a subsidiary of DB.

=== Draisine service ===
Lauterecken-Grumbach station is, along with the stations of Altenglan and Staudernheim, one of three stations that rent draisine vehicles. Thus, it can, like the other two stations, be used as the starting point for draisine rides, as well as the end point for tours beginning in Altenglan or Staudernheim.
