= Kaiserslautern Hauptbahnhof =

Railway station in Kaiserslautern, Germany

Kaiserslautern Hbf
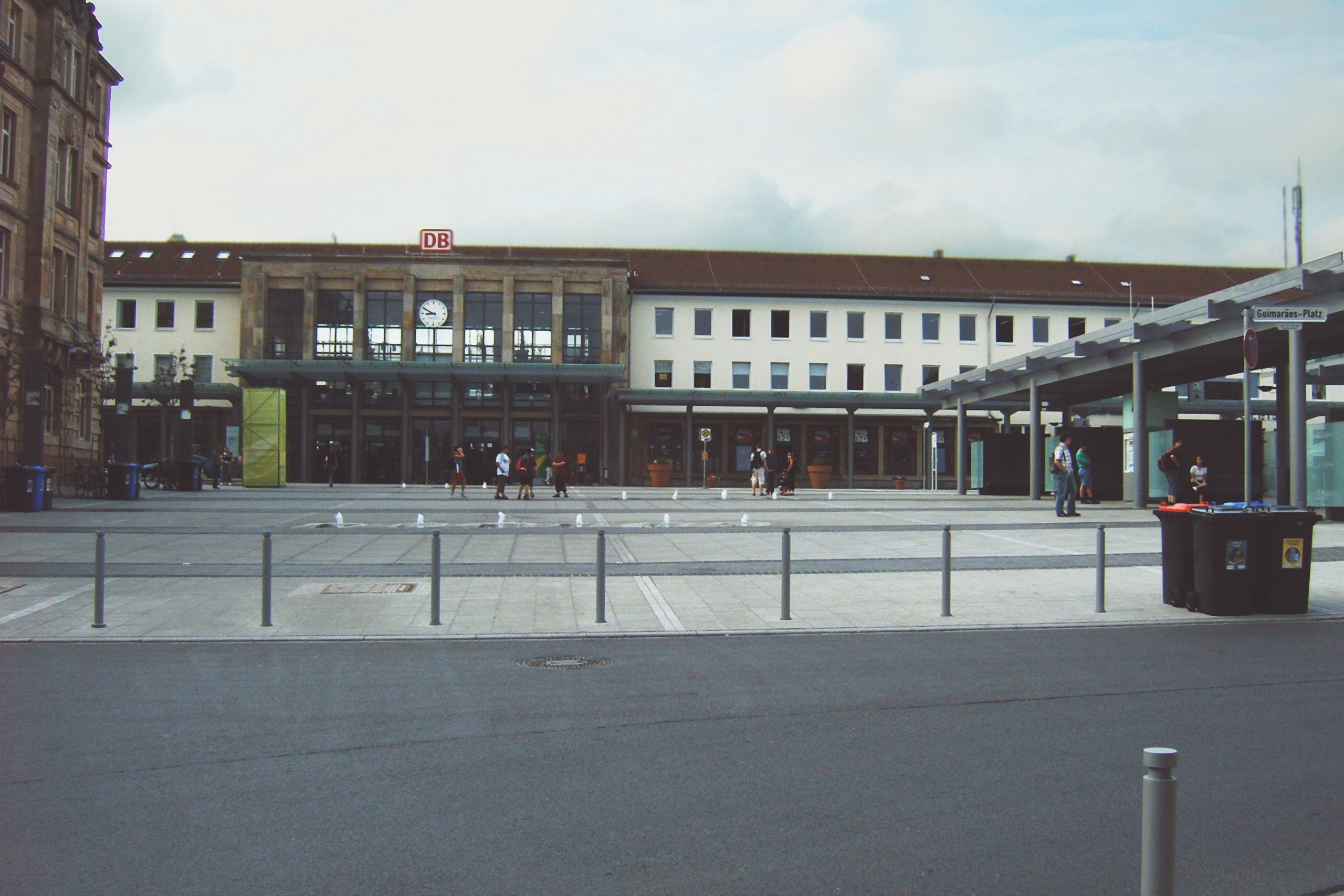

General information
- Location: Bahnhofstr. 1, Kaiserslautern, Rhineland-Palatinate; Germany
- Coordinates: 49°26′9″N 7°46′8″E
- Owner: DB Netz
- Operator: DB Station&Service
- Lines: Saarbrücken–Mannheim (km 43.7) (KBS 665.1/665.2/670); Kaiserslautern–Enkenbach (km 0.0) (KBS 672); Lauter Valley Railway (km 0.0) (KBS 673); Biebermühl Railway (km 0.0) (KBS 672)
- Platforms: 13: 7 through tracks; 6 terminal tracks

Construction
- Accessible: Yes

Other information
- Station code: 3082
- DS100 code: SKL
- IBNR: 8000189
- Category: 2
- Fare zone: VRN: 800
- Website: www.bahnhof.de

History
- Opened: 1848

Services
Preceding station	DB Fernverkehr	Following station
Homburg (Saar) Hbf towards Saarbrücken Hbf	ICE 3 Sprinter	Neustadt (Weinstraße) Hbf towards Berlin Südkreuz
Homburg (Saar) Hbf towards Saarbrücken Hbf	ICE 15	Neustadt (Weinstraße) Hbf towards Ostseebad Binz
Landstuhl towards Saarbrücken Hbf	ICE 60	Neustadt (Weinstraße) Hbf towards München Hbf
Saarbrücken Hbf towards Paris Est	ICE/TGV 82	Mannheim Hbf towards Frankfurt (Main) Hbf
Preceding station	DB Regio Mitte	Following station
Landstuhl towards Koblenz Hbf	RE 1 Südwest-Express	Neustadt (Weinstraße) Hbf towards Heidelberg Hbf
Terminus	RE 6	Hochspeyer towards Karlsruhe Hbf
Galgenschanze towards Pirmasens Hbf	RB 64	Terminus
Terminus	RB 65	Enkenbach towards Bingen Hbf
Kaiserslautern Pfaffwerk towards Lauterecken-Grumbach	RB 66	Terminus
Vogelweh towards Kusel	RB 67	Terminus
Kindsbach towards Merzig (Saar)	RB 70	Terminus
Preceding station	Vlexx	Following station
Winnweiler towards Koblenz Hbf	RE 17	Terminus
Preceding station	Rhine-Neckar S-Bahn	Following station
Kennelgarten towards Homburg (Saar) Hbf	S1	Hochspeyer towards Osterburken
Terminus	S2	Hochspeyer towards Mosbach (Baden)
Location

Kaiserslautern Hauptbahnhof is a through-station in the German city of Kaiserslautern and one of seven stations in the city. It is a stop on the Rhine-Neckar S-Bahn and Deutsche Bahn’s Intercity-Express network and a hub for all the regional trains of the western Palatinate. On 10 June 2007, the Rhealys high-speed rail consortium established a service with a stop in Kaiserslautern, reducing travel time to Paris to two and a half hours.

In 2003, the station building was renovated and it now houses among other things, a service point and several shops. The station provides step-free access to all platforms. The redesigned Kaiserslautern station forecourt includes a busy bus station, allowing a convenient transfer between bus and rail. Buses run to the University of Kaiserslautern, Betzenberg and the central bus interchanges at Schillerplatz and Rathaus, where there are connections to all bus routes.

Prior to the closure of the Einsiedlerhof marshalling yard, Kaiserslautern was a significant rail freight hub.

== History ==
Kaiserslautern Hauptbahnhof was opened in 1848 along with the Homburg–Kaiserslautern section of the Palatine Ludwig Railway. The Palatine Ludwig Railway is still the most important line serving the station.

On 16 May 1871 the Alsenz Valley Railway was completed from Bad Münster to Hochspeyer; its trains ran into Kaiserslautern. To shorten the route for long-distance traffic, a line was opened on 15 May 1875 between Kaiserslautern and Enkenbach (at the closest point on the Alsenz Valley Railway), allowing trains to run between Kaiserslautern, Bad Kreuznach and the Ruhr and between Kaiserslautern, Worms and Frankfurt without having to pass through Hochspeyer.

It received a new entrance building in 1879. The Lauter Valley Railway was opened on 15 November 1883 between Kaiserslautern and Lauterecken-Grumbach. In 1913 the Kaiserslautern–Waldfischbach line opened, completing the Biebermühl Railway to Pirmasens.

The second station building was badly damaged in the Second World War and demolished after the war. The current station building was completed in the early 1950s. It was rebuilt in 2003.

== Connections ==
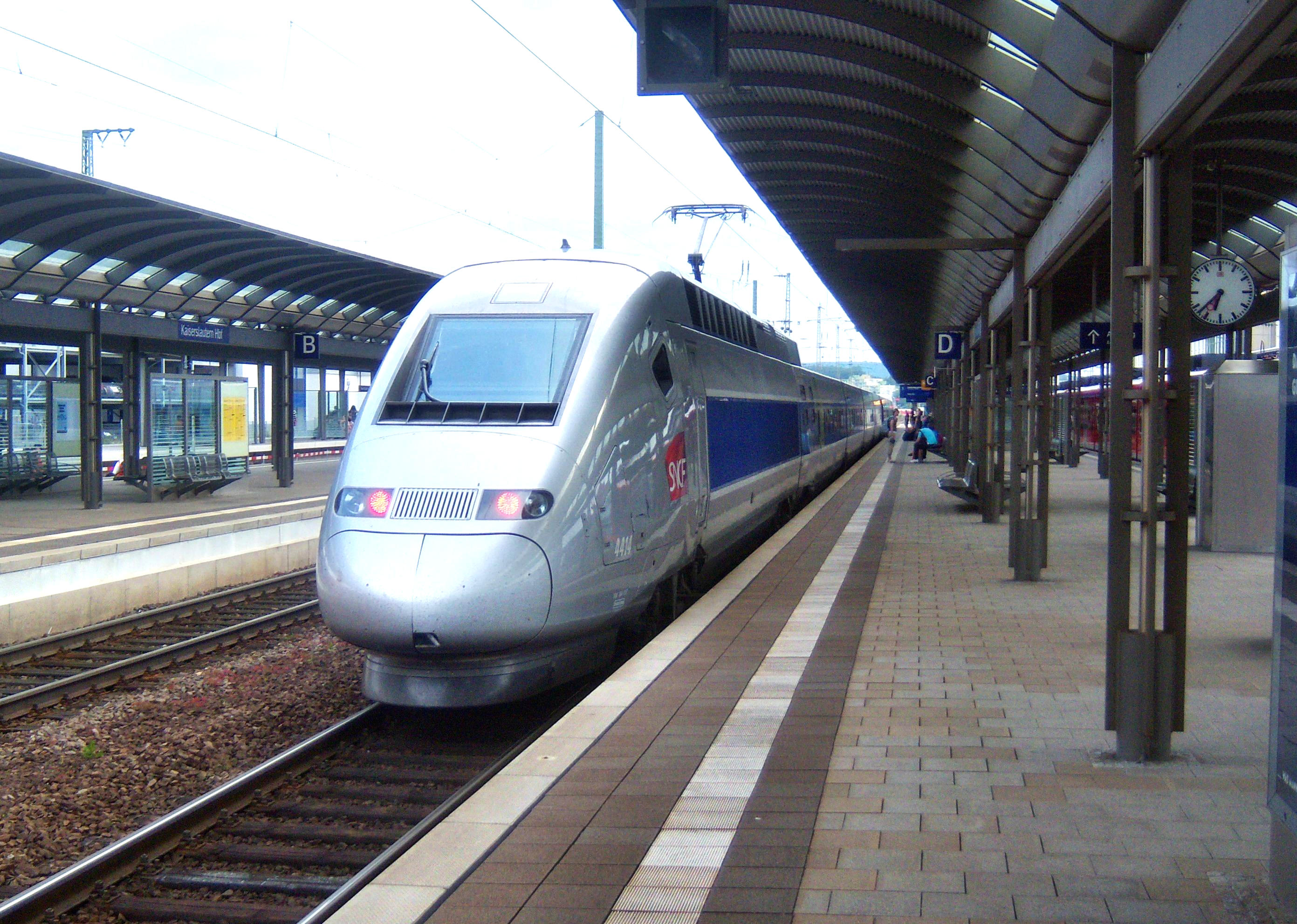
TGV on the way to Paris

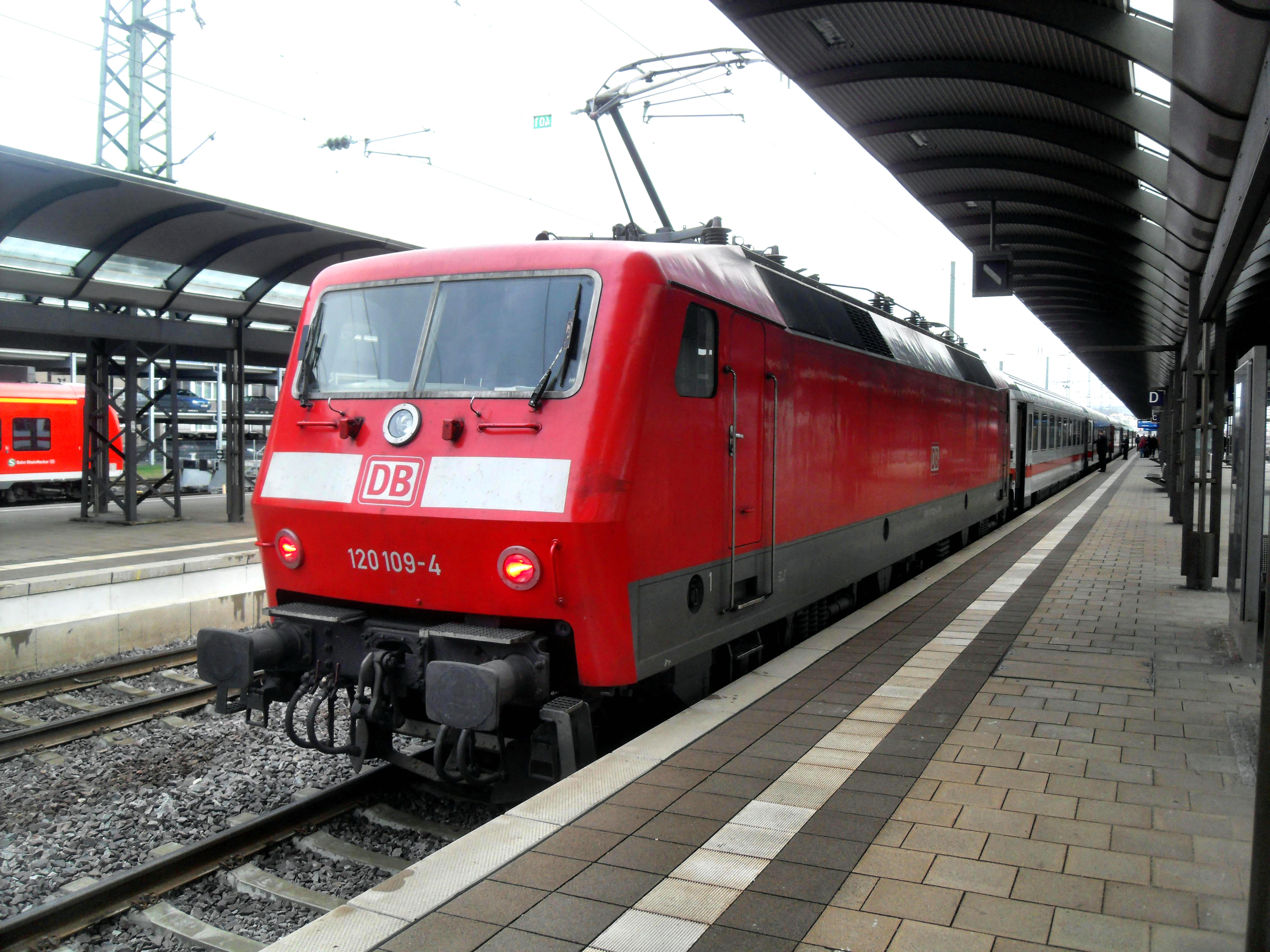
InterCity train hauled by DB Class 120 locomotive in Kaiserslautern on the way to Saarbrücken

In the 2026 timetable, the following services stop at the station:

=== Long distance ===
Line	Route	Frequency
ICE 3	Saarbrücken – Kaiserslautern – Mannheim – Frankfurt – Berlin – Berlin Südkreuz	One train pair
ICE 15	Saarbrücken – Kaiserslautern – Mannheim – Darmstadt – Frankfurt – Erfurt – Halle – Berlin – Eberswalde – Stralsund – Binz	One train pair
ICE 60	Saarbrücken – Kaiserslautern – Mannheim – Stuttgart – Ulm – Augsburg – Munich	2 train pairs
ICE/TGV 82	Paris – Saarbrücken – Kaiserslautern – Mannheim – Frankfurt	5 train pairs

=== S-Bahn and DB regional ===
Line	Route	Interval
S1	Homburg – Kaiserslautern – Neustadt – Schifferstadt – Ludwigshafen – Mannheim – Heidelberg – Eberbach – Mosbach-Neckarelz – Osterburken	60 minutes
S2	Kaiserslautern – Neustadt – Schifferstadt – Ludwigshafen – Mannheim – Heidelberg – Eberbach – Mosbach-Neckarelz – Mosbach	60 minutes
RE 1	Koblenz – Trier – Saarbrücken – Homburg – Kaiserslautern (– Neustadt – Mannheim)	60/120 minutes
RE 6	Kaiserslautern – Neustadt – Landau – Winden – Wörth – Karlsruhe	120 minutes
RE 17	Kaiserslautern – Winnweiler – Rockenhausen – Alsenz – Bad Münster am Stein – Bad Kreuznach – Bingen (Rhein) – Koblenz	120 minutes
RB 64	Kaiserslautern – Schopp – Waldfischbach – Pirmasens Nord – Pirmasens	60 minutes
RB 65	Kaiserslautern – Enkenbach – Winnweiler – Rockenhausen – Alsenz – Bad Münster am Stein – Bad Kreuznach – Langenlonsheim – Bingen	60 minutes
RB 66	Kaiserslautern – Lampertsmühle-Otterbach – Olsbrücken – Wolfstein – Lauterecken-Grumbach	60 minutes
RB 67	Kaiserslautern – Landstuhl – Glan-Münchweiler – Altenglan – Kusel	60 minutes
RB 70	Kaiserslautern – Landstuhl – Hauptstuhl – Bruchmühlbach-Miesau – Homburg – Limbach – Kirkel – Saarbrücken	60 minutes

== Sources ==
=== References ===
- Emich, Hans-Joachim; Becker, Rolf (1996). Die Eisenbahnen an Glan und Lauter [The railways on the Glan and the Lauter] (in German).
- Engbarth, Fritz (2007). Von der Ludwigsbahn zum Integralen Taktfahrplan – 160 Jahre Eisenbahn in der Pfalz [From the Ludwig Railway to the Integral Timetable—160 years of Railways in the Palatinate] (in German).
- Sturm, Heinz (2005). Die pfälzischen Eisenbahnen [The Palatine Railways] (in German). Ludwigshafen am Rhein: pro MESSAGE. ISBN 3-934845-26-6.
