= Altenglan station =

Railway station in Altenglan, Germany

Altenglan
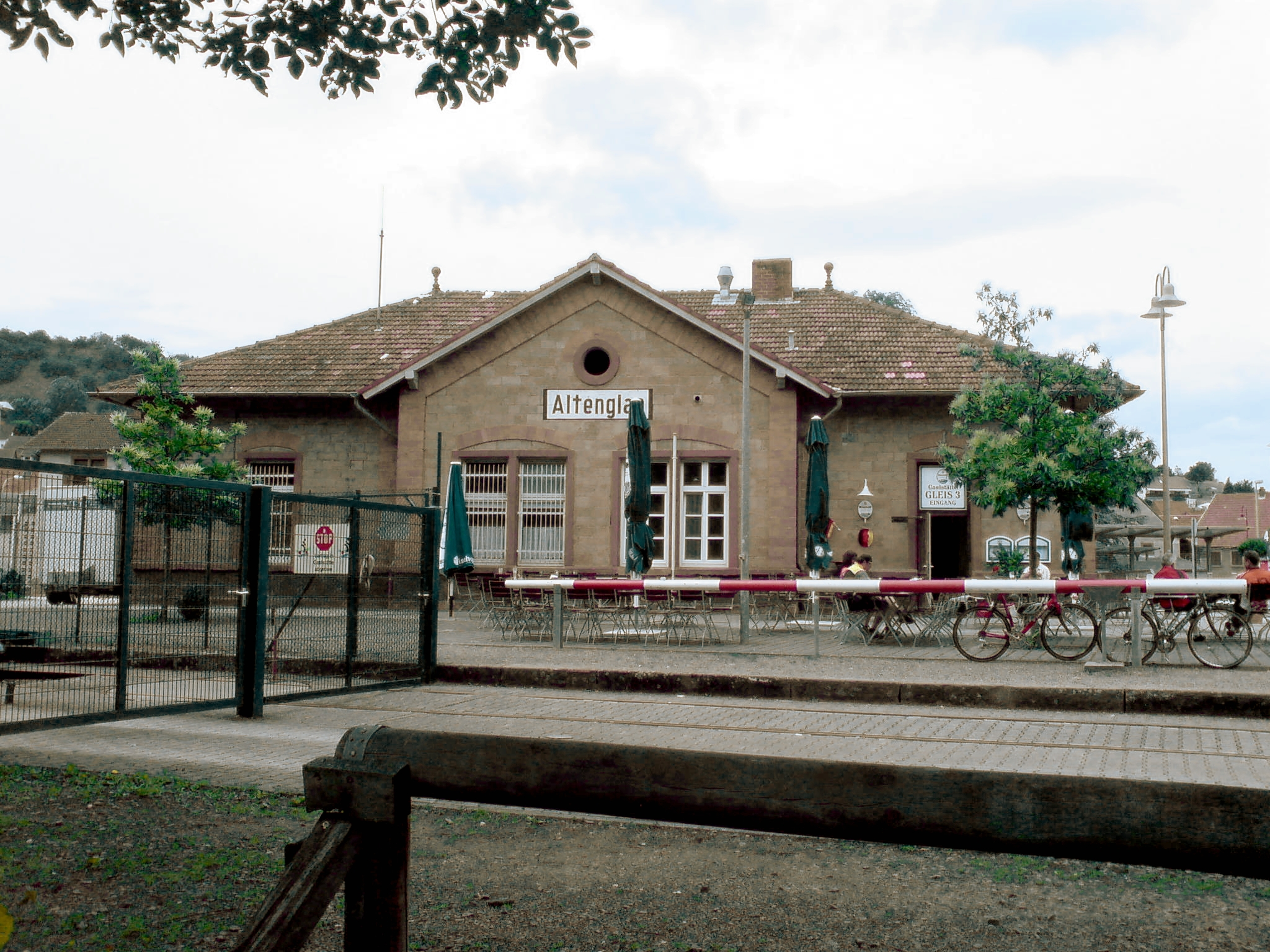

General information
- Location: Bahnhofstr. 45, Altenglan, Rhineland-Palatinate; Germany
- Coordinates: 49°32′51″N 7°27′45″E
- Lines: Landstuhl–Kusel (13.9) (Note: The line originally had a continuous chainage from Landstuhl. The station was therefore at 24.1 km. With the opening of the Glan Valley Railway a new chainage was introduced starting in the west at Scheidt on the Mannheim–Saarbrücken railway, which ran via Glan Munchweiler and Altenglan to Bad Münster. The chainage from Landstuhl has since ended at Glan-Munchweiler. Chainage on the Altenglan-Kusel section has since started at 0.0 km. The Glan Valley Railway later received a new chainage, starting in Homburg.); Homburg–Bad Münster (32.0 km)
- Platforms: 2

Construction
- Accessible: Yes

Other information
- Station code: 96
- DS100 code: SALG
- IBNR: 8000491
- Category: 6
- Fare zone: VRN: 788
- Website: www.bahnhof.de

History
- Opened: 22 September 1868

Services
Preceding station	DB Regio Mitte	Following station
Rammelsbach towards Kusel	RB 67	Theisbergstegen towards Kaiserslautern Hbf
Location

Altenglan station is the station of the village of Altenglan in the German state of Rhineland-Palatinate. It is classified by Deutsche Bahn as a category 6 station. and has two platforms and sidings. The station is located in the network area of the Verkehrsverbund Rhein-Neckar (Rhine-Neckar Transport Association, VRN). The address of the station is Bahnhofstraße 45.

It was created on 22 September 1868 as a through station with the opening of the Landstuhl–Kusel railway. It became a junction station with the completion of the Glan Valley Railway (Glantalbahn), Homburg–Bad Münster on 1 May 1904, which was built as a strategic railway. It lost this function when traffic between Altenglan and Lauterecken-Grumbach on the Glan Valley Railway was closed at the end of 1995. Since 2000, it has also been the southern end of a section of the Glan Valley Railway from Altenglan to Staudernheim that is used for a recreational draisine operation. (Note: The Glan Valley Railway branched in Odernheim as the section to Staudernheim that was built in 1897 and the section opened in 1904 along the Nahe to bad Münster. The latter was closed in 1961 and later dismantled.)

== Location ==
The station is located on the southern outskirts of Altenglan. It has a parking area, bicycle parking, bus connections to the surrounding countryside, a turning loop for buses as well as barrier-free access.

=== Railways ===
Just before reaching Altenglan station, the line from Landstuhl to Kusel and the largely-disused Glan Valley Railway came together and both lines continue to the south towards Glan-Münchweiler. The tracks of the Glan Valley Railway no longer connect with the other tracks in Altenglan; a draisine operation has run between Altenglan and Staudernheim since 2000.

== History ==
The first attempts to have a railway built through the western North Palatine Uplands towards Kusel go back to 1856. During the construction of the Rhine-Nahe Railway (Rhein-Nahe Eisenbahn), a route was proposed by the Bavarian Palatinate, which would have run from near Boos on the Nahe along the Glan via Lauterecken and Altenglan, then along the Kuselbach via Kusel to Sankt Wendel or along the Oster to Neunkirchen. However, the efforts were unsuccessful since Prussia preferred to have such a railway line primarily on its own territory.

A memorandum appeared in Kusel in 1863, supporting a railway that would branch from the Palatine Ludwig Railway in Landstuhl and run through the Mohrbach, Glan and Kuselbach valleys to Kusel. It noted among other things that a wire nail factory and a textile factory were located in Altenglan and claimed that the nail factory could double its annual production of 10,000 Zentner if the railway was built. It was argued that, among other things, the railway construction would improve the rather poor economic and social conditions of the region.

The construction of the 28.7 km stretch from Landstuhl to Kusel was largely uncomplicated. Cuttings were only necessary in the country around Rammelsbach, where the work force encountered a diorite deposit, which was mined in the following years and gave an additional impetus to rail transport. The Rammelsbach Tunnel was the largest building project along the line. Construction on the section between Glan-Munchweiler and Kusel was delayed because not enough workers could be recruited. The first freight train ran on 28 August 1868.

=== Further development and construction of the Glan Valley Railway ===
The Kusel-Landstuhl railway was officially opened on 22 September 1868. In 1899, Altenglan—like all stations along the line—received completion signals.

Even before the opening of the line, the communities in the valley north of Altenglan called for a rail connection, but at first they were unsuccessful. The project initially failed because Prussia and Bavaria, through which the line would mainly run, had different ideas on how to guarantee interest on it. After the Franco-Prussian War of 1870/71, a railway line along the Glan was supported for military reasons, particularly in Prussia. The first draft plan was made for the line in 1871, which essentially corresponded to the line as built, but the proposal quickly failed. Another argument for the construction of the line was that it would create the shortest possible connection between Homburg and Bingen. However, because the border between Prussia and Bavaria would have hindered the construction, there were at the time plans for a branch line from Altenglan to St Julian, which would have run exclusively through Bavarian Palatinate.

Towards the end of the nineteenth century Bavaria finally abandoned its resistance to the construction of a strategic railway, as Franco-German relations had deteriorated significantly in the meantime. While the Fortress of Metz had already been connected by several lines, the connection from the Rhine was very awkward. After an option running to the south-east was eliminated, the plan for a railway from Mainz via Bad Münster along the Glan, sharing the Kusel line between Altenglan and Glan-Münchweiler was adopted. The latter would be duplicated on this section at a total cost of 1.108 million marks. Construction began in July, 1902, with the work divided into several sections, including the Altenglan–Lauterecken section. This work was carried out by Italian day labourers.

=== World War I and the interwar period (1904–1939) ===
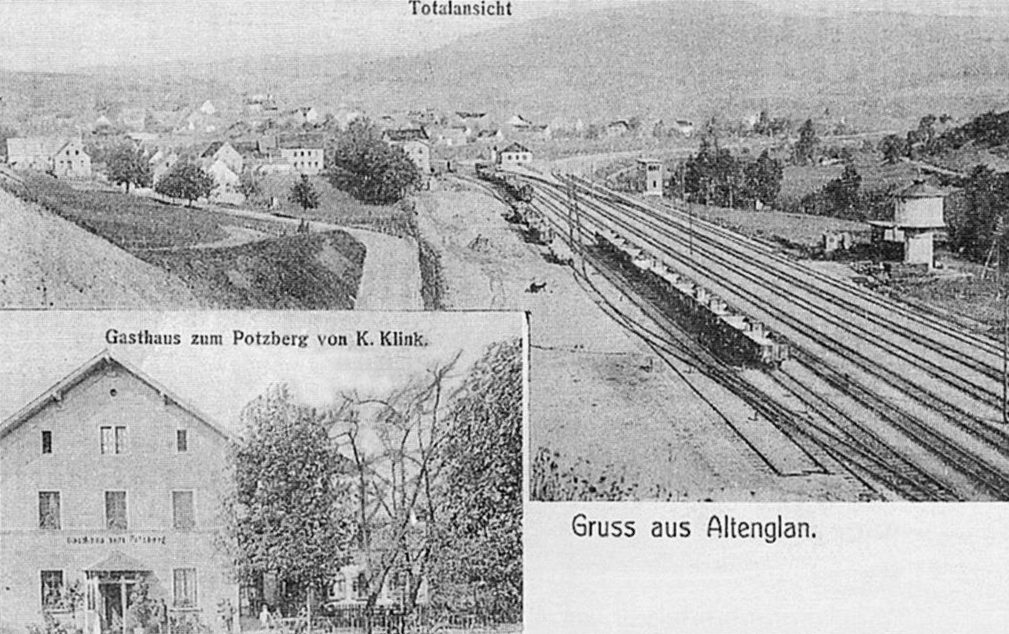
Track plan of Altenglan station in 1908

The Glan Valley Railway from Bad Münster to Homburg was opened throughout on 1 May 1904; from Glan-Münchweiler to Altenglan it ran together with the Kusel–Landstuhl railway. Altenglan was rebuilt as a “wedge station” (Keilbahnhof) and it also received a new entrance building. There was a total of 26 stations along the new line through Altenglan.

The line between Altenglan and Rammelsbach was changed since the Rammelsbach tunnel had proved to be too narrow for freight trains. This meant that it was often necessary to tranship freight to Kusel from wagon to wagon. The new line opened in 1936 ran around the Remigiusberg (hill) instead. In the same year an extension was completed from Kusel to Türkismühle for strategic reasons, yet for the time being no through trains ran between Altenglan and Türkismühle. Due to the dissolution of the Reichsbahndirektion (railway administration of) Ludwigshafen and the division of the Glan Valley Railway between the Reichsbahndirektion Mainz (immediately north of the station) and the Reichsbahndirektion Saarbrücken (from Homburg to Altenglan), the track supervisor’s office (Bahnmeisterei) of Altenglan, which had existed since 1904, was closed in 1937. Between 24 and 27 September 1938, a military exercise was held in the Palatinate. Troop trains from Frankfurt were despatched to stations including, among others, Altenglan.

=== World War II and post-war period (1939–1949) ===
Since during the Second World War, the timetable could often not be met, a directory of “essential trains" was published on 5 May 1941. This included at least six trains per day between Glan-Münchweiler and Altenglan and four trains per day between Homburg and Glan-Münchweiler each way. On 28 August 1944, the station was attacked by fighter-bombers. Between 28 September and 2 December 1944, there were further air raids. As a result, the signal box was destroyed and the chief signalman was killed. On 15 January 1945, there was another air raid on the station.

In 1945, the capacity of the Glan Valley Railway was almost fully utilised by the many Allied military trains. The troops trains were forced to make longer stops in Altenglan. Many locals took advantage of this to trade with the soldiers.

=== Deutsche Bundesbahn (1949–1993) ===
In 1952, the track supervisor’s office in Altenglan was re-established. It was responsible originally for the Eisenbach-Matzenbach–Niedereisenbach-Hachenbach section of the Glan Valley Railway and between Altenglan and Schwarzerden. In the years that followed its remit changed several times; in 1958 it was responsible along the Glan Valley Railway from Jägersburg to Altenglan and between Altenglan and Bedesbach-Patersbach. In 1976, it was responsible for the entire Landstuhl–Kusel line and between Jägersburg and Bedesbach-Patersbach. On 12 September 1957, there was a strong storm in the area and some unattached wagons escaped from Kusel station. It was only stopped by chocks in Altenglan station after it had been running for about 20 minutes.

In the early 1960s, the second track was dismantled between Altenglan and Odernheim am Glan. On 5 December 1965 there was a flood in Kusel, in which the railway facilities were affected, so the traffic between Altenglan and Kusel had to be stopped in the evening and on the following day. As early as 1968, Deutsche Bundesbahn (DB) first proposed that the Glan Valley Railway be closed, but this failed due to the opposition of the provincial governments of Rhineland-Palatinate and the Saarland. A new application by DB from 1973 to close freight traffic between Altenglan and Lauterecken on 31 December 1975 was also not approved. In 1977, the Altenglan track supervisor’s office was dissolved. From 27 January of that year a block signalling system was instituted on the line between Altenglan and Kusel.

Although it had no longer been uses as a main line railway for decades, the Glan-Münchweiler–Odernheim section of Glan Valley Railway was not officially downgraded to a branch line until 29 September 1985. Between 28 March and 19 April 1989, one track was removed from the previously double track section between Glan-Münchweiler and Altenglan, although it had already been converted to a single-track operation a year earlier. On 18 June 1990, DB introduced Signalisierter Zugleitbetrieb (SZB, a system of train control for low-speed branch lines using simplified signalling technology) on the line, which up to that time had only been used on the Nagold Valley Railway.

Freight was also discontinued on the Altenglan–Ulmet section in 1991. In 1992, the closure process for the Altenglan–Lauterecken section was initiated, but this was affected by the conversion of Deutsche Bundesbahn into Deutsche Bahn on 31 December 1993. On 6 July 1993, a weed-spraying made the last run over the section.

=== Deutsche Bahn and draisine operation (since 1994) ===
In 1994, there was a prospect for reactivating the Glan Valley Railway between Altenglan and Bedesbach for the transport of gravel. For this reason Deutsche Bahn engineers inspected the section in October 1994 to see what work would have to be carried out on it. The Altenglan-Lauterecken-Grumbach section of the Glan Valley Railway was closed at the end of 1995.

Students of the Kaiserslautern University of Technology proposed the establishment of a draisine operation on the Altenglan–Staudernhein section of the line to prevent its final closure and the dismantling of its track. The supporters of this project included a councillor of Kusel district, Winfried Hirschberg. After an examination of the draisine lines in Templin in Brandenburg—at that time the only one in Germany—and near Magnières in Lorraine, detailed planning began, which was implemented in 2000. Since 2000 the Altenglan station of the southern starting point of the trolley route and, along with Lauterecken-Grumbach and Staudernheim, one of three stations offering trolley rentals.

At the end of 2003, reconstruction work began at the station. This included, among other things, the raising and extension of the two remaining platforms to provide passengers with barrier-free access to the trains. At the same time a bus station was built with a reversing loop. The rebuilt station was officially opened in April 2004.

Between 2009 and 2011, information for passengers at the station was also improved, mainly in the form of the installation of an electronic passenger information system.

== Buildings ==
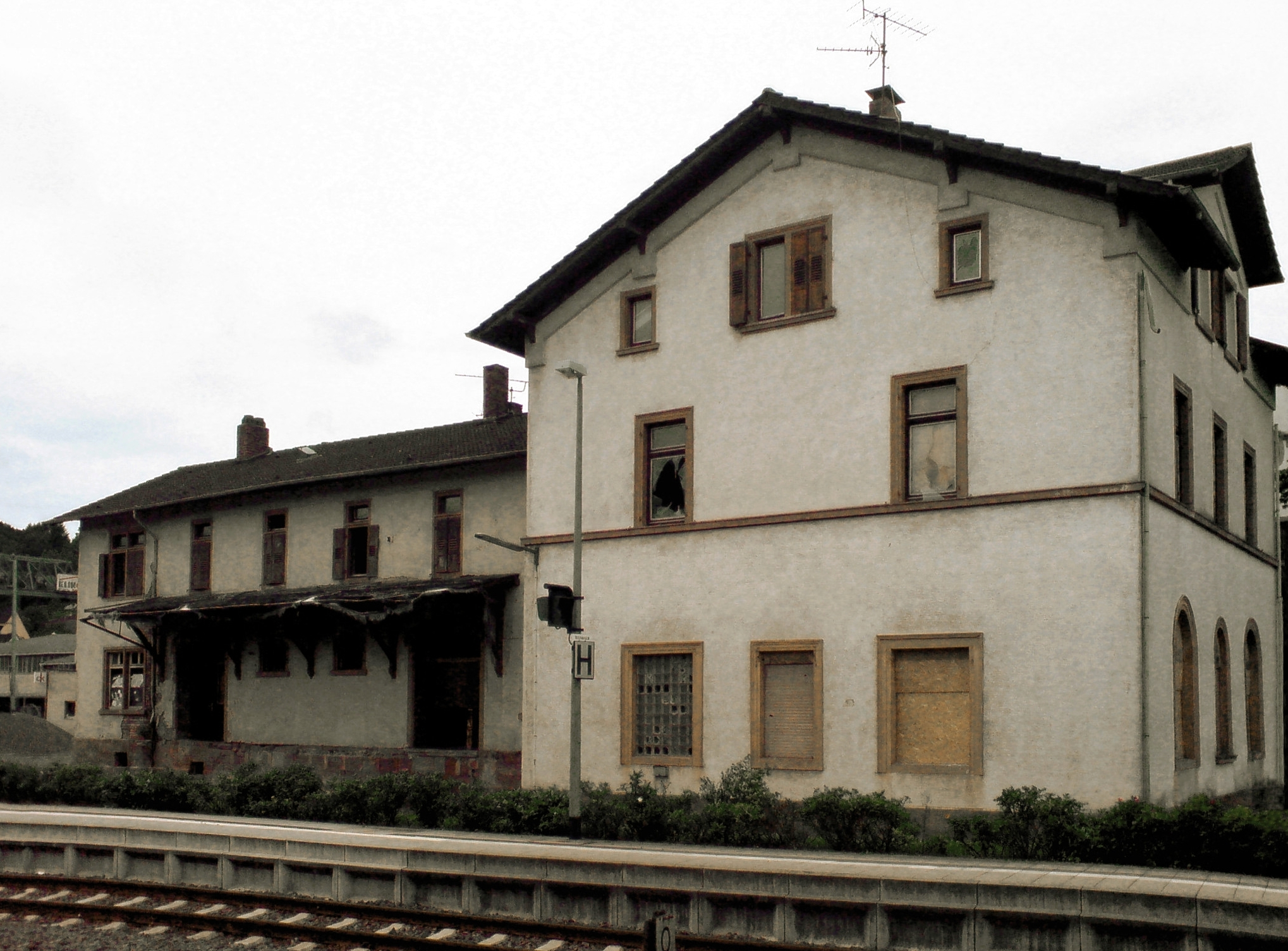
Original station building, later used for freight handling, now a historic monument, in front of the platform for traffic towards Landstuhl

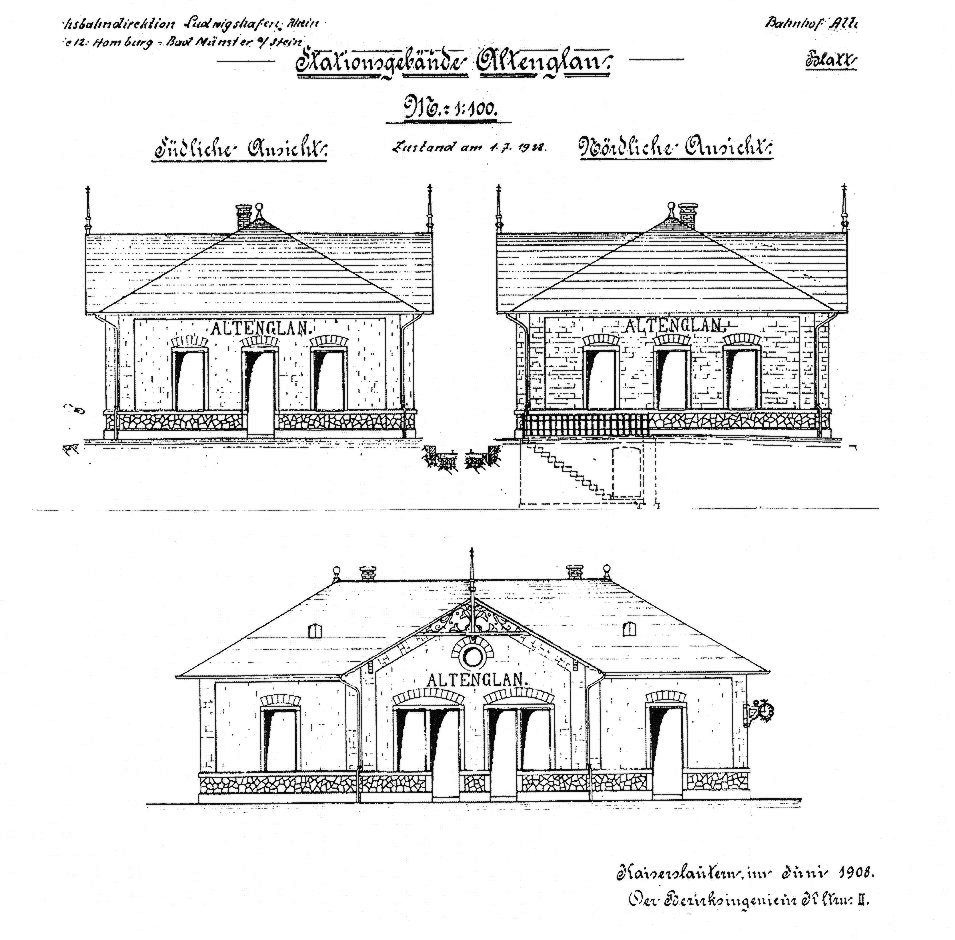
Profile of the second station building

During the construction of a line to Kusel between 1862 and 1868, the station received a two and a half storey entrance building to the west of the tracks, which were originally equipped with rooms for staff accommodation and administrative offices. The architectural style contains elements of neo-classicism and was built in the style of the other Palatine stations that were built in the 1860s and 1870s, such as the Alsenz Valley Railway opened in 1870 and 1871 and the Germersheim–Landau railway opened in 1872. Due to the importance of the station, the execution was carried out exactly as in Glan Munchweiler and Kusel on a relatively large scale. The ground floor has windows and doors built in the round arch style (Rundbogenstil). Plasterwork is applied to the exterior walls. Later, the station underwent some structural changes. Originally it had a wooden porch, which was dismantled in the meantime. The main building is connected by a loading ramp to a freight shed, which was built with the slope of its roof facing the track. This building was later extended. The precinct has heritage protection. Its address is Eisenbahnstraße 3.

=== Second entrance building ===
During the opening of the Glan Valley Railway, Altenglan station received a new entrance building and platforms were built between the line to Kusel and the line towards Lauterecken-Grumbach. The sandstone building was built in an architectural style that borrows from the great northern railways that were connected by the strategic railway. Nevertheless, its architecture was completely different from the other stations in the entire Palatinate. Thus, the symmetrically-constructed building has only one storey and the lines of the tops of its roof form a cross. A restaurant is now housed in it.

=== Platforms ===
Platforms
Tracks	Usable length	Platform height	Current use
4	130 m	55 cm	Regionalbahn services towards Kusel
5	135 m	55 cm	Regionalbahn services towards Landstuhl

=== Trans regio depot ===
Trans regio which ran had the contract for the operation of passenger services on the line from Landstuhl to Kusel from 2000 to 2008, had its depot in the south-eastern part of the station area. Its address is Bahnhofstraße 81.

=== Other buildings ===
In the first half of the 20th century the station had a kiosk. It was closed in 1933, when Adolf Hitler and the Nazi Party came to power, as it was considered to be a meeting place of left-wing forces. In addition, the station still had two signal boxes in the 1960s, but these are now out of service. In the course of the installation of the Signalisierter Zugleitbetrieb system in 1989, a cube of concrete was built on the platform, which houses the current signalling equipment.

== Operations ==
=== Passengers ===
==== Long-distance services ====
Neither the Kusel line nor the Glan Valley Railway have ever been used by significant long-distance services. Since Altenglan was a junction of the Kusel line and the Glan Valley Railway and was relatively centrally located on the latter, all long-distance services that ran on the Glan Valley Railway stopped at the station. So in 1926 and 1927, the Calais-Wiesbaden-Express ran over the Glan Valley Railway (but only towards Wiesbaden) with a stop in Altenglan. In November 1942 there was a pair of fast services on the Berlin–Kassel–Frankfurt–Altenglan–Homburg–Metz route for troops on leave, but only with special arrangement. In 1945 and 1946 a pair of express trains ran on the route between Saarbrücken and Koblenz for the last time, but access to it for civilian traffic was restricted. This was also the last continuous passenger service over the Glan Valley Railway, including the Odernheim–Bad Münster section, which was closed in the early 1960s.

==== Local services ====
From the opening of the Kusel–Landstuhl line, it was operated with two mixed and two ordinary passenger trains each day. In the first year of the Glan Valley Railway between Homburg and Glan-Munchweiler, it was served by four services towards Bad Münster and four towards Homburg. This included only three pairs of trains from Homburg to Bad Munster; the other ran only between Homburg and Altenglan. The services between Landstuhl and Kusel were supplemented by trains on the Altenglan–Kusel section that established with to the opening of the line.

30,507 tickets were sold at the station in 1905. In 1920, there was a train from Altenglan to Saarbrücken on Saturdays and there were trains between Homburg and Kusel and between Saarbrücken and Bad Münster. Especially in the 1930s, the timetable included several routes that operated over sections of different lines, such as the Kaiserslautern–Lauterecken–Altenglan–Kusel route. Although the line to Kusel was extended to Türkismühle at the end of 1936, it was not until a year later that a through train ran between Altenglan and Türkismühle.

In 1965, two pair of express services were established between Zweibrücken and Mainz, running via the Glan Valley Railway and stopping in Altenglan. These were operated with diesel locomotives of class V 100.20 hauling so-called Silberling carriages. The initiator of this service was the then mayor of Zweibrücker, Oscar Munzinger, who was also at this time in the parliament of Rhineland-Palatinate and wanted to have a service between his two work places. In the vernacular, these trains were therefore referred to as the "Munzinger Express". Due to the already missing link between Odernheim and Bad Münster these trains had to run to Staudernheim and reverse there to use the Nahe Valley Railway to run to the east. In 1967, there was another pair of services between Homburg and Gau Algesheim. From 1970, these links were officially classified as only regional rapid-transit (Nahschnellverkehrszüge) services and they were closed in 1979.

==== Current services ====
Since 2006, the station is served hourly by the Glan Valley Railway (Regionalbahn 67) in the fare system of the VRN.

Train class	Route	Frequency
RB 67	Kaiserslautern – Landstuhl – Glan-Münchweiler – Altenglan – Kusel	Hourly

=== Freight ===
As at most nearby stations, the carriage of quarried material formed a large part of the freight. In 1905, 42,348.12 tonnes were sent or received, for example.

In 1920, a local freight train (Nahgüterzug) ran between Lauterecken-Grumbach and another between Altenglan and Kusel. A through freight train (Durchgangsgüterzug) ran between Altenglan and Homburg and, if necessary, another one ran from Kaiserslautern to Altenglan.

In the early 1920s, a workers colony was established at a quarry at Schneeweiderhof in the municipality of Eßweiler, which had been connected by a ropeway conveyor to Altenglan station in 1919. Therefore, several loading tracks were established north of Altenglan station. In 1976, the ropeway conveyor was dismantled and the loading tracks were dismantled. There was a loading facility located north-west of the station near the former Rammelsbach tunnel, which was connected by a ropeway conveyor, built around 1900, to the quarry of Hugo Bell on the slopes of the Remigiusberg.

In the 1990s it was served in the evenings by a freight exchange train (Übergabegüterzug) from Kaiserlsuatern-Einsiedlerhof station on the Mannheim–Saarbrücken railway via Altenglan to Kusel. All freight tracks have since been removed and there are now no freight operations at the station.

=== Buses ===
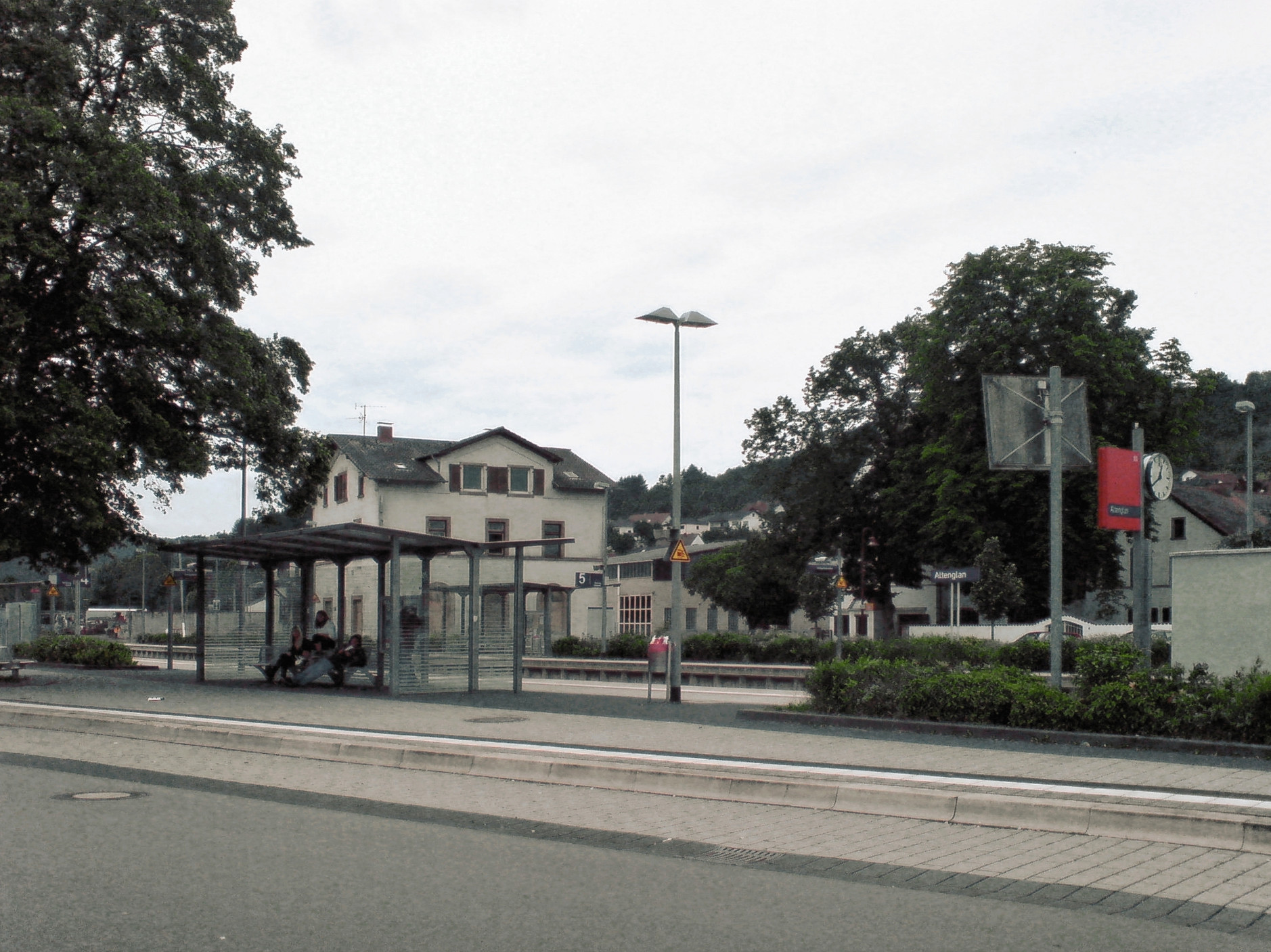
Platforms of the railway station, the bus station in the foreground and the former freight office in the background

There is a bus stop at the station, which is built next to the second entrance building. It is served by the following bus routes:

- 270 (Kusel–Rammelsbach–Altenglan-Patersbach-Bedesbach–Erdesbach–Ulmet–Rathsweiler–Niederalben–Eschenau–Sankt Julian–Glanbrücken–Offenbach am Glan–Wiesweiler–Lauterecken),
- 271 (Kusel–Rammelsbach–Altenglan–Patersbach–Erdesbach–Ulmet–Rathsweiler–Niederalben–Eschenau–Sankt Julian–Gumbsweiler–Glanbrücken–Offenbach am Glan–Wiesweiler–Lauterecken),
- 274 (Kusel–Rammelsbach–Altenglan–Welchweiler–Elzweiler–Horschbach–Hinzweiler–Rothselberg/Wolfstein)
- 275 (Kusel–Rammelsbach–Altenglan–Friedelhausen–Bosenbach–Niederstaufenbach–Eßweiler/Jettenbach (Pfalz)–Rothselberg–Kreimbach-Kaulbach–Olsbrücken/Rutsweiler an der Lauter–Roßbach (Pfalz)–Wolfstein
- 276 (Kusel–Rammelsbach–Altenglan–Mühlbach am Glan–Rutsweiler am Glan–Theisbergstegen–Gimsbach–Haschbach am Remigiusberg–Kusel
- 277 (Altenglan–Friedelhausen–Bosenbach–Niederstaufenbach–Oberstaufenbach–Neunkirchen am Potzberg–Föckelberg–Etschberg)
- 2977 (Ruftaxi) (Altenglan–Wildpark Potzberg

All lines are operated by Saar-Pfalz-Bus GmbH, a subsidiary of DB.

=== Draisine service ===
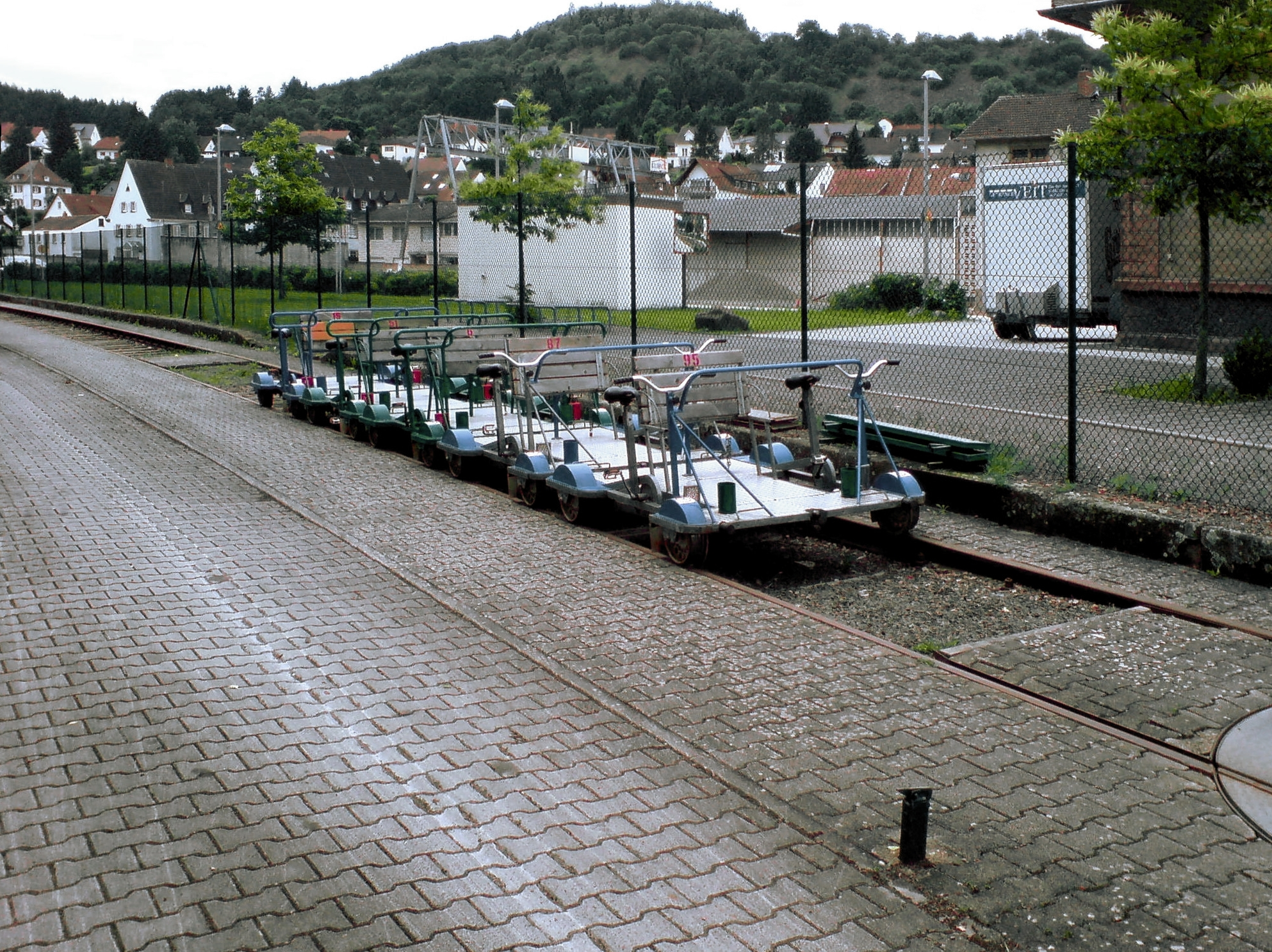
Draisines in Altenglan station

Altenglan station is, along with the stations of Lauterecken-Grumbach and Staudernheim stations, one of three stations that rent draisine vehicles. Thus, it can, like the other two stations, be used as the starting point for draisine rides. The office for hiring draisines and the starting point for draisine operations are located on the disused track towards Lauterecken-Grumbach, which has been separated from the tracks of the Kusel-Landstuhl line.

== Sources ==
- Hans-Joachim Emich, Rolf Becker (1996). Die Eisenbahnen an Glan und Lauter (in German). Waldmohr: Self-published. ISBN 3-9804919-0-0.
- Fritz Engbarth (2007). Von der Ludwigsbahn zum Integralen Taktfahrplan - 160 Jahre Eisenbahn in der Pfalz (2007) (PDF) (in German). Archived from the original (PDF; 6.2 MB) on 13 December 2015.
- Wolfgang Fiegenbaum, Wolfgang Klee (1997). Abschied von der Schiene. Stillgelegte Bahnstrecken von 1980-1990 (in German). Stuttgart: Transpress Verlag. pp. 207–209. ISBN 3-613-71073-0.
- Christian Schüler-Beigang, ed. (1999). Kreis Kusel (in German). Vol. 16. Worms: Kulturdenkmäler in Rheinland-Pfalz. Denkmaltopographie Bundesrepublik Deutschland/Werner. ISBN 3-88462-163-7.
- Heinz Sturm (2005). Die pfälzischen Eisenbahnen (in German). Ludwigshafen am Rhein: pro MESSAGE. ISBN 3-934845-26-6.
