= Scheidt (Saarbrücken) =

- Stadtteil of Saarbrücken
- Interactive map of Scheidt
- Location within Germany Location within Saarland
- Coordinates: 49°14′42″N 7°03′32″E
- Country: Germany
- State: Saarland
- District: Saarbrücken
- Town: Saarbrücken

Population (2020)
  - Total: 4,087
- Time zone: UTC+01:00 (CET)
  - Summer (DST): UTC+02:00 (CEST)
- Postal codes: 66133
- Dialling codes: 0681
- Vehicle registration: SB

Scheidt (German pronunciation: [ʃaɪt]) (Palatine German: Schääd [ɕɛːt]) is a borough (Stadtteil) of the city of Saarbrücken, in the southwest of Germany. Population (2020): 4,087.
