= Altenglan =

- Municipality
- Coat of arms

- Location of Altenglan within Kusel district
- Interactive map of Altenglan
- Location within Germany Location within Rhineland-Palatinate
- Coordinates: 49°33′01″N 7°27′39″E
- Country: Germany
- State: Rhineland-Palatinate
- District: Kusel
- Municipal assoc.: Kusel-Altenglan

Government
  - Mayor (2019–24): Yvonne Draudt-Awe

Area
  - Total: 13.61 km^{2} (5.25 sq mi)
- Elevation: 225 m (738 ft)

Population (2025-12-31)
  - Total: 2,730
  - Density: 201/km^{2} (520/sq mi)
- Time zone: UTC+01:00 (CET)
  - Summer (DST): UTC+02:00 (CEST)
- Postal codes: 66885
- Dialling codes: 06381
- Vehicle registration: KUS
- Website: www.altenglan.de

Altenglan is an Ortsgemeinde – a municipality belonging to a Verbandsgemeinde, a kind of collective municipality – in the Kusel district in Rhineland-Palatinate, Germany. It belongs to the Verbandsgemeinde of Kusel-Altenglan. Altenglan is a recognized tourism community. Also, named after the municipality is the Altenglan Formation, a lithostratigraphic entity, and by extension, so is Altenglanerpeton, a microsaur whose fossil remains were found therein.

== Geography ==
=== Location ===
The municipality lies in the uplands in the Western Palatinate on the river Glan, which is the village's namesake, at an elevation in the valley of some 200 m above sea level, although the elevations within municipal limits reach almost 400 m (Bistersberg 387 m on the Glan's left bank; Kalmet 390 m on the Glan's right bank), and on the slopes of the Potzberg within the formerly self-administering municipality of Mühlbach almost 500 m. Altenglan lies roughly 5 km northeast of the district seat and nearest town, Kusel, and 25 km northwest of Kaiserslautern. In Altenglan, the Kuselbach and the Reichenbach empty into the Glan. The dale here forms a broad bowl, although the pattern is broken somewhat by the two streams that meet the Glan here, one from each side. Part of the Potzberg massif lies within Altenglan as does part of the long Remigiusberg ridge, although these hills' summits all lie outside the municipality's boundaries. The municipality has an area of 1 362 ha, of which 237 ha is wooded.

=== Neighbouring municipalities ===
Altenglan borders in the north on the municipality of Bedesbach, in the northeast on the municipality of Welchweiler, in the east on the municipality of Bosenbach, in the southeast on the municipality of Föckelberg, in the south on the municipalities of Rutsweiler am Glan and Theisbergstegen, in the southwest on the municipality of Rammelsbach, in the west on the town of Kusel and the municipality of Blaubach and in the northwest on the municipality of Erdesbach. Altenglan also meets the municipalities of Elzweiler and Haschbach am Remigiusberg at single points in the east and south respectively.

=== Constituent communities ===
Altenglan's Ortsteile are Altenglan, Mühlbach am Glan and Patersbach.

=== Municipality’s layout ===
The original settlement of Altenglan stretched along the higher parts of the left banks of both the Glan and the Kuselbach, along today's Glanstraße from the graveyard with the old church to the T-junction formed by today's Bahnhofstraße. This can clearly be seen in a stock book compiled in the mid-18th century. Other settlements on Bahnhofstraße had also already arisen by the 18th century. The last house before the bridge was the one that is now the rectory, and across the bridge (known as the Pfarrbrücke – “Parochial Bridge” – or the Schmiedebrücke – “Smithy Bridge”) stood a smith's workshop. Likewise already standing by the 18th century were houses in the area of today's Ringstraße, which the stock book describes as a gemeiner Weg – “common way”. Thus, a big triangle stretching back from the forks of the Glan and Kuselbach was settled at the time when the original cadastral survey was done in 1848. The settlement began to spread out in the 19th century towards Eckstraße and Tränkstraße, towards Neuwiesenstraße and today's Schulstraße. In the early 20th century, houses were built on Kuseler Straße. Altenglan station was built in 1868 along with the railway line between Kusel and Landstuhl. New, bigger residential areas arose after the Second World War west of Bahnhofstraße (Bildstock, Am Köpfchen, Gartenstraße) and to the side of Kuseler Straße (Alte Straße, Am Heiligen Spiegel, An den Rödwiesen). A new rectory was built in 1934 on Kuseler Straße, after the old one had been sold. The town hall, in its original form, the then municipality had built after the Second World War. Expansions took place after the founding of the Verbandsgemeinde. Most of the shops, supermarkets, banks and inns stand on the main street along with Austraße, and on Glanstraße, while the school with its gymnasium and event hall and the Verbandsgemeinde administration building (town hall) stand on Schulstraße. Adjoining the school (Gustav-Schäffner-Schule, a Regionale Schule) is a sporting ground. The sport and leisure swimming pool lies east of the village off the main road going towards Bosenbach. The mediaeval church stands in the middle of the graveyard in the village's northeast at the end of Glanstraße and across Kuseler Straße.

As a very old village, Altenglan has a relatively large municipal area, great swathes of which were opened up to development after the Second World War. The biggest tract of woodland is the Bruderwald, a typical mixed forest once owned by the Remigiusberg Monastery. Besides cropraising and livestock breeding, the municipality also worked at winegrowing to a limited extent in the time before the Second World War.

== History ==
=== Antiquity ===
The Altenglan area was settled as early as the last period in the New Stone Age and on into Gallo-Roman times, bearing witness to which are archaeological finds. Since the name Glan is of Celtic origin, it could be that the centre was settled continuously up to the Frankish takeover of the land. From Roman times, too, traces have been preserved, such as a sculpture of a woman, the so-called “Venus of Glan”, which has since disappeared.

=== Middle Ages ===
The name Gleni appears along with the name Cosla (Kusel) in the historical work from the Archbishopric of Reims compiled by the early mediaeval historical writer Flodoard. According to the greater Remigiustestament, which is included in this work, the so-called Remigiusland with Kusel and Altenglan had supposedly already been bequeathed by King Clovis to Saint Remigius as a donation. This forgery was made possibly with the object of reinforcing the claim to Reims holdings in what is today the Western Palatinate through a reference to the famous bishop Remigius. It is highly likely that King Childebert II transferred the Remigiusland with the villages of Cosla and Gleni to Bishop Giles about 590. On these grounds, the municipality celebrated its 1,400-year jubilee in 1989. Altenglan surely exercised an important midpoint function in the Remigiusland.

In the time that followed, Altenglan's history corresponded with the Remigiusland’s. In 1112, the Remigiusland was taken over as a Vogtei by the Counts of Veldenz. In 1444, it passed as a Vogtei to the Dukes Palatine Zweibrücken, which bought the region – a Vogtei was only a protective function – in 1552. In connection with the Remigiusland, Altenglan was also mentioned in one of Louis the German’s documents, which was issued in 865, although it is only known today from a 13th-century copy. The name’s first mention in an original document, one bearing witness to an exchange of holdings by the Bishop of Worms, dates from 992.

According to Prüm Abbey’s directory of holdings, the Prümer Urbar, this abbey in the Eifel owned near a place called Glan a major holding. It is disputed today whether this meant the village of Altenglan. It is likewise disputed whether a knight named Straßenraub lived in Altenglan or indeed in Neuenglan, believed to have been the same place as today’s Hundheim. Straßenraub’s actual family name, however, was Hettenberg. Since it is known that the noble family Hettenberg had holdings at Altenglan, it is at least possible that Straßenraub lived here.

The first Schultheiß, Dylen (Till), was named in 1388. As well, a 1364 document, in which Count Heinrich I of Veldenz set forth the conditions for the support of his son, also named Heinrich, and his wife Lauretta, Altenglan was mentioned as an Amt seat along with Brücken near Ulmet. It can be assumed that Altenglan had had this administrative function since the founding of the County of Veldenz in the earlier half of the 12th century. In 1410, the two Ämter were merged, and the new seat was Pilsbach, a place on the Glan’s right bank that was later swallowed up by Ulmet. Altenglan thereby lost its central function, which it had likely had since the Early Middle Ages.

=== Modern times ===
Johannes Hoffmann’s 1588 description of Altenglan may be exaggerated, but it nevertheless gives today’s reader a little glance at the village’s original importance. Hoffmann described the village of Alten-Glan as “quite an old place” that had been built, like Trier and some other towns, more by “heathens” than anyone else, and these heathens had apparently built Altenglan into a “very great town”, girding it each side of the river Glan with ringwalls, so that the river flowed through the middle of the town.

Altenglan's first known municipal charter dates from 1567, and was renewed in 1581. At the time of the 1609 ecclesiastical Visitation, there were 37 families in the village. As a result of the Plague, the population shrank greatly even before the Thirty Years' War broke out. According to the Huberweistum, a 1630 Weistum (a Weistum – cognate with English wisdom – was a legal pronouncement issued by men learned in law in the Middle Ages and early modern times), there were then only 30 families still living in the village. That same year, Imperial troops plundered Altenglan. As in the whole swathe of countryside around Kusel, especially because of the wartime events of 1635, very few people in Altenglan survived this frightful war, and almost all the houses had been destroyed. For a long time, it was not even worth the trouble of holding church services in the church. Even after the population had built itself back up somewhat through newcomers to the village, there was more war, this time King Louis XIV's wars of conquest. About 1680, Altenglan was said to be “burnt”. Nevertheless, during the 18th century, the population once again rose quickly by both migration to the village and natural growth, and according to the 1742 stock book, there were once more 47 houses in the village.

In the time of the French Revolution, French Revolutionary troops plundered Altenglan (1794), but otherwise left it unscathed. The village now belonged to the Department of Sarre, the Arrondissement of Birkenfeld, the Canton of Kusel and the Mairie (“Mayoralty”) of Ulmet.

==== Recent times ====
After the formation of the Bavarian Rheinkreis, as the Palatinate was known after the Congress of Vienna awarded it to Bavaria, Altenglan remained in the Canton of Kusel, but now formed the seat of its own Bürgermeisterei (“mayoralty”) to which Patersbach also belonged (which is now a constituent community of Altenglan). The original 1845 cadastral survey shows 85 houses. In the time of industrialization, cloth weavers from Kusel began walking their cloth in Altenglan. The Schleip machine factory set up a wire drawing works. Beginning in 1870, the hard-stone quarrying industry expanded. Along with those who earned their livelihood at agriculture, the number of workers at quarries and factories rose steadily. In 1890, a workers’ association was founded. The workforce held fast to its political outlook even after Adolf Hitler’s 1933 seizure of power, with 15% of the voters locally voting against Hitler at the November 1933 Reichstag elections at a time when voters throughout the Third Reich were voting 99% yes (the ballots offered no alternative to Hitler, the Nazis and their sympathizers).

Towards the end of the Second World War, Altenglan had to suffer steady Allied bombings, and villagers were killed. On 9 March 1945, American troops marched in. Post-war times brought a new territorial arrangement and Altenglan was grouped into newly founded state of Rhineland-Palatinate. The Bürgermeisterei of Altenglan was kept for the time being, within the district of Kusel. In the course of administrative restructuring in Rhineland-Palatinate in 1968, The village of Altenglan became an Ortsteil of a new municipality that likewise bore the name Altenglan, but also included Patersbach and Mühlbach besides. The original plan had called for Bedesbach to be part of this municipality, too, but the residents there successfully fought a campaign to keep themselves out of it. At the same time, Altenglan became the seat of a Verbandsgemeinde in 1972 to which all together 16 Ortsgemeinden belong.

=== Population development ===
In 1609, there were 37 families living in Altenglan and thus, the village had roughly 100 inhabitants. There was a drop in population, however, even before the Thirty Years' War, likely due to the Plague and other epidemics, and there were only 30 families living in Altenglan by 1630. Fewer than ten villagers survived the Thirty Years’ War, but repopulation came with newcomers, although this was interrupted, and perhaps even reversed, by King Louis XIV's wars of conquest. There was an upswing in numbers early in the 18th century. At the time when the 1749 stock book was compiled, some 50 families lived in Altenglan and thereby some 200 inhabitants. In the next one hundred years, the population doubled. By 1835, according to the original cadastral survey (dates for this vary because the survey took a long time to complete), there were some 400 people in Altenglan.

The following table shows population development over the centuries for Altenglan, with some figures broken down by religious denomination:

| Year | 1825 | 1835 | 1871 | 1905 | 1939 | 1961 | 2007 |
| Total | 455 | 509 | 621 | 979 | 1,088 | 1,840 | 2,948 |
| Catholic | 12 | | | | 176 |
| Evangelical | 422 | | | | 1,648 |
| Jewish | 21 | | | | – |
| Other | – | | | | 26 |

=== Municipality’s name ===
The oldest form of the municipality's name, Gleni, appears in the history of the Archbishopric of Reims by the mediaeval historical writer Flodoard, in a forgery of Archbishop Remigius's will no less, likely put together by Archbishop of Reims Hinkmar. This form of the name also crops up in one of Louis the German's documents from 865 or 866. Gleni is a Celtic word for flowing body of water. The name, therefore, refers to the river that flows by the village. The modern form Altenglan leads to the supposition that there must once have been another village elsewhere on the Glan, founded later, with the name Neuenglan (alt and neu are German for “old” and “new” respectively), which writer M. Dolch identifies as the village now called Hundheim. Other older forms of the name Altenglan are as follows: Aldenglane (992), Glene (1124), Glana (1138), Glannam (1154), Glayna (1342), Alden Glane (1364), Alttenglahn (1629).

== Religion ==
As early as the Early Middle Ages, it is likely that Altenglan was an ecclesiastical hub for the area between Rammelsbach and Erdesbach. It is, however, unknown when the parish acquired its first church. The Altenglan church had its first documentary mention in 1252, and in 1290 a village priest named Nikolaus was mentioned. Altenglan was also long regarded as the residence of the mediaeval Glan chapter. Only one archpriest of the Glan chapter, though, is known to have had his seat in Altenglan. His name was Jakob von Glayn, who was mentioned in 1365. It is assumed that the designation Glankapitel (“Glan chapter”) referred to the whole Glan region and not to the archpriest's seat in particular.

At the time of the introduction of the Reformation in 1537, the militant clergyman Nikolaus Dieburg was in office. He set about defending himself against the change, not only carrying out his ecclesiastical duties but also farming his glebe and taking the vineyards into the church's care. In 1558, the first ecclesiastical Visitation since the Reformation's introduction was undertaken, while others were now undertaken at seven-year intervals thereafter. Because so few people survived the Thirty Years' War, there was no resident clergyman in Altenglan for 111 years, until 1746, and consequently no church services, either. Towards the end of this era, though, the parish had the church renovated, preserving for the time being an old Romanesque steeple. In 1747, at what was then the edge of the village, a rectory was built on the Kuselbach; this is nowadays the Autohaus Lotter – a car dealership. In 1805, the Romanesque steeple had to be torn down because it had fallen into such disrepair. It was replaced with the roofed tower that still stands today. In 1860 or 1861, the church got new bells and in 1873, it had an organ for the first time. In 1934, the old rectory was sold and a new one was built on Kuseler Straße. In 1952, the church once again got new bells and in 1962 once again a new organ.

Catholic Christians once again settled in Altenglan beginning in the late 17th century, albeit in small numbers. Their religious needs were fulfilled by the Catholic church of the town of Kusel at first, but since about 1954, the church of Rammelsbach has been responsible for that.

A small Jewish community was established in the late 18th century. By the time that Hitler's Nazis began persecuting Jews in 1933, however, there were no longer any Jews in Altenglan. There never was a synagogue.

The Protestant parish of Altenglan is a merger of two parishes, one Altenglan and the affiliated centres of Bedesbach, Patersbach and Friedelhausen, together with the other, Mühlbach am Glan. The greater parish tends a flock of roughly 3,200, with 2,400 in Altenglan and 800 in Mühlbach.

== Politics ==
=== Municipal council ===
The council is made up of 20 council members, who were elected by proportional representation at the municipal election held on 7 June 2009, and the honorary mayor as chairman.

The municipal election held on 7 June 2009 yielded the following results:

| Year | SPD | CDU | BL | Total |
|---|---|---|---|---|
| 2009 | 11 | 4 | 5 | 20 seats |
| 2004 | 11 | 6 | 3 | 20 seats |

“BL” is a voters’ group.

=== Mayor ===
Altenglan's mayor is Yvonne Draudt-Awe. The two outlying centres each have representation on council through an Ortsvorsteher. For Patersbach, this is Harry Schwarz, and for Mühlbach, Diana Schmitt.

=== Coat of arms ===
The municipality's arms might be described thus: Tierced in mantle dexter azure Saint Remigius proper vested and mitred argent garnished Or bearing in his dexter hand a book gules garnished of the second and in his sinister hand a bishop's staff of the third, over his dexter shoulder a dove displayed reversed wings inverted proper, sinister argent a lion rampant of the first armed, langued and crowned of the third, in base gules the letter V surmounted by the letter V reversed, both of the third.

Alternatively, “the letter V reversed” might be called “the letter lambda”.

Saint Remigius on the dexter (armsbearer's right, viewer's left) side is a reference to the village's former allegiance to the Bishopric of Reims. A disputed version of the local history from the 9th and 10th century, however, holds that King Clovis I, the Frankish Kingdom's founder, after his 496 victory over the Alamanni, donated the so-called Remigiusland, including Kusel and Altenglan, to Saint Remigius himself, the Bishop of Reims, rather than simply to the abbey that Remigius oversaw. The dove symbolizes Clovis's baptism. The Veldenz lion on the sinister (armsbearer's left, viewer's right) side is a reference to the village's former allegiance to the County of Veldenz and later to the Duchy of Zweibrücken. The charge in base stems from the old Ulmet court seal, which was also once used to seal documents from Altenglan. However, another source identifies the charge as the letters A and V (although the crossbar seems to be missing from the A), supposedly standing for “Altenglan” and the seat of the Verbandsgemeinde.

== Culture and sightseeing ==
=== Buildings ===
The following are listed buildings or sites in Rhineland-Palatinate’s Directory of Cultural Monuments:

==== Altenglan (main centre) ====
- Kuseler Straße 2 – Protestant parish church; Baroque aisleless church with hipped roof, marked 1720, essentially older, ridge turret 1806; Romanesque sculpture fragment; thorough renovation 1956, architect Hans-Georg Fiebiger, Kaiserslautern; at the graveyard: warriors’ memorial 1914-1918, dying warriors, 1927 by A. Bernd, Kaiserslautern
- Bahnhofstraße 2 – Late Baroque house, marked 1785; lengthy building with half-hipped roof; characterizes village's appearance
- Eisenbahnstraße 3 – railway station; spacious reception building, one-floor goods shed with loading ramp, 1862/1868
- Eisenbahnstraße 8/10 – administrative and residential buildings of the post; two-floor winged buildings, one-floor garage wing, 1925, architects Heinrich Müller and colleagues
- Friedelhauser Straße 11 – former administrative building of the Basalt Aktiengesellschaft, Linz am Rhein; Baroque Revival building with hipped roof, 1921/1922, architects Heinrich Mattar and Eduard Scheler, Cologne; in the back shed and stable buildings
- Glanstraße 30 – former town hall; sandstone-framed building with half-hipped roof, 1856/57, conversion 1896; characterizes square's appearance

==== Mühlbach ====
- Moorstraße 13 – Protestant church; quarrystone aisleless church with belltower, Swiss chalet style, 1933/1934, architect Government Master Builder Stahl, Landau
- Near Genickelstraße 4 – former smithy; one-floor timber-frame building, partly solid, pitched-roof addition, whetstone, earlier half of the 18th century
- Mühlweg 3, Mühlbacher Mühle (monumental zone) – group of buildings from the former gristmill; seven-axis sandstone-framed plastered building, expansion 1892 and oilmill (1858), barn complex (after 1845) and the millstream diverted from the Glan
- Streitmühle 1 – former Seylsche Mühle (mill); Late Baroque sandstone-framed plastered building, latter half of the 18th century; weir complex; commercial buildings: shed and servants’ house, towards 1859, livestock barn and storehouse not as old; one-arched stone bridge, 1854, architect Johann Schmeisser, Kusel
- Water fountain, south of the village near Moorstraße – fountain facility, sandstone and cast iron, 1846, architect Karl Klee

==== Patersbach ====
- Hauptstraße 24 – sandstone-framed Quereinhaus (a combination residential and commercial house divided for these two purposes down the middle, perpendicularly to the street), 1864
- Near Zum Horst 6 – former smithy, plastered building with gabled, partial skillion roof, possibly about 1865; technical equipment
- Fockenmühle 2 – Fockenmühle (mill); former oilmill and gristmill; three-floor single-peak complex, essentially from the 18th century, marked 1864 and 1871 (conversions), floors added in 1922 and 1938, livestock barn 1871; technical equipment from the 1930s, millrace built leading underground and course of the Glan beginning at the mill's weir complex

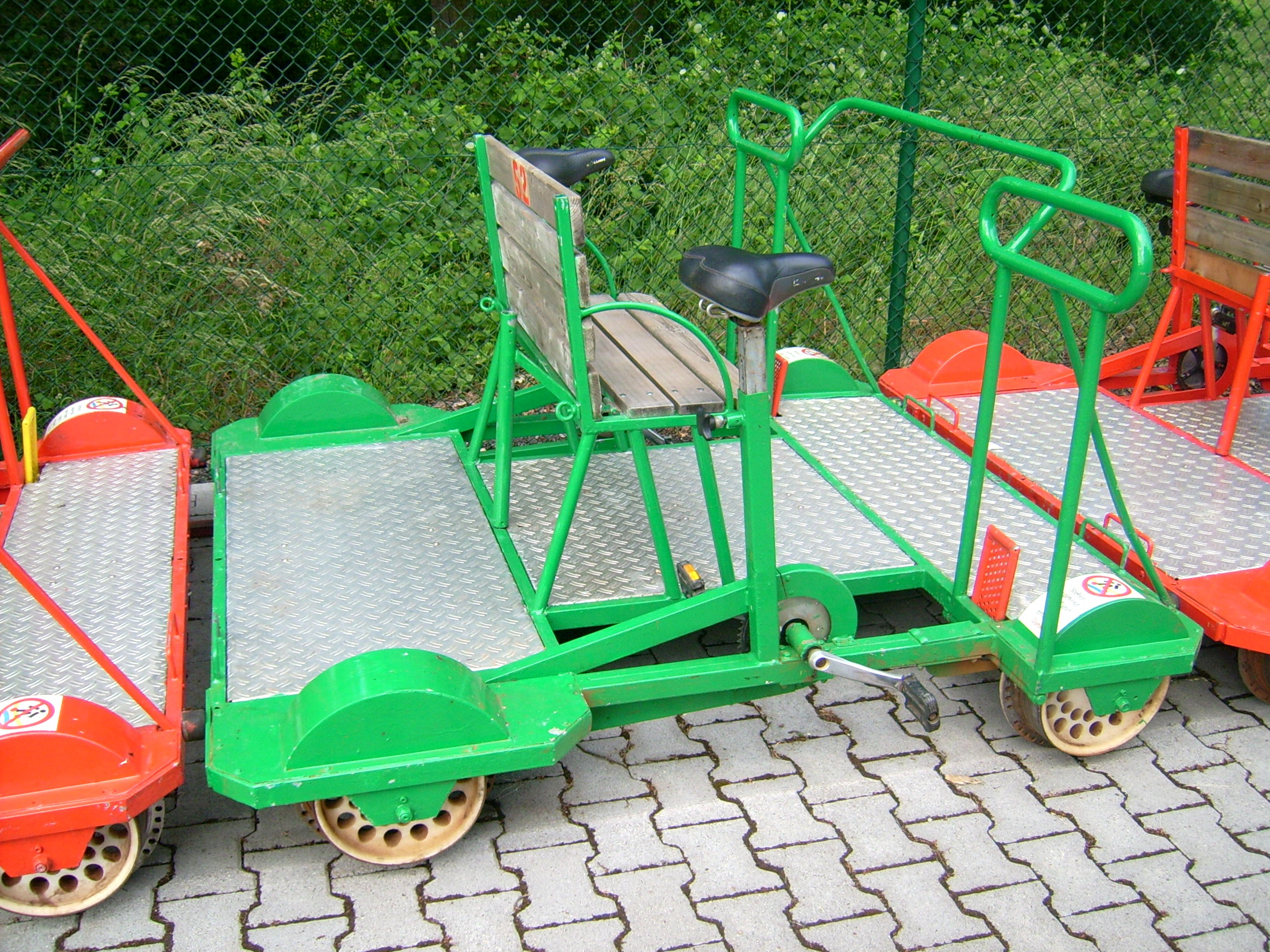
Draisine on the Altenglan-Staudernheim line

Altenglan is the starting and ending point of the Draisinenstrecke (railway upon which visitors can ride draisines). The outlying centre of Mühlbach lies at the foot of the Potzberg, on whose summit stands the Potzbergturm (tower); a game park can also be found here. From Altenglan's main centre, a pleasant hike can be taken up the Remigiusberg (mountain) to the old provost's residence.

=== Regular events ===
- Glaner Kerb, or dialectally the (Alten-)Glaner Kerwe, the yearly church consecration festival held on the third weekend in August since 1876
- Feuerwehrfest (“Fire Brigade Festival”), held every other year on the third weekend in September
- Herzdriggermarkt (market), held on the first weekend in June
- Weihnachtsmarkt (“Christmas Market”), held during the second week in Advent

=== Clubs ===
The Altenglaner Carneval-Verein (Carnival club) distinguishes itself each year with ambitious “Carnival sessions”. The Katastrophenorchester (“Catastrophe Orchestra”), a joke musical ensemble, is known far and wide. Other clubs include the following:

- Gewerbeverein Altenglan (commercial association)
- German Red Cross local chapter
- Sportverein Altenglan (sport club)
- Sportfischerverein Mittleres Glantal (angling)
- DLRG local chapter
- Imkerverein Altenglan (beekeeping)
- Gesangverein Liederkranz Altenglan (singing club)

== Economy and infrastructure ==
=== Economic structure ===
For many years, Altenglan was a village characterized by agriculture, but with certain administrative functions. Today, agriculture plays only a subordinate role. Industrial operations arose as early as the time after the Thirty Years' War, when chalk deposits within the municipal area were worked. This was, however, given up after the Second World War. In 1835, the Altenglan mill was taken over by clothmakers from Kusel, who built it into a walking mill. The wire-drawing mill, too, was established by entrepreneurs from Kusel. The wireworks is now out of business, and the building itself has since been torn down. In 1872, the municipality reached an agreement with the railway for the use of the quarry to mine ballast and crushed stone in Altenglan for railway and road building. Beginning in 1952, industries located in Altenglan, among them Mainmetall and a concrete works.

=== Established businesses ===
The biggest industrial concern in Altenglan is the firm Main Metall, which has a foundry in Altenglan that manufactures alloys of outstanding quality that are further processed for building machines, special vehicle axles, for instance.

Two big food markets, several other shops and inns, an optician’s shop, a pharmacy, five physicians’ practices, several workshops, carpentry shops, a varnisher and a scrapyard are all located in Altenglan.

Currently, the commercial-industrial park named “Im Brühl” is being opened up, and the fire brigade has already located there. The location's favourability towards transport is one reason why the park has been steadily developing. Among others, a carpentry business and a metal construction business have opened for business there.

=== Transport ===
Because two major brooks empty into the Glan here, Altenglan has always been a transport hub, lying as it does in or near several valleys. In Altenglan, Bundesstraße 423 ends at Bundesstraße 420, along which the Kusel interchange on Autobahn A 62 (Kaiserslautern–Trier) can be reached ten kilometres to the southwest. Bundesstraße 420 itself leaves the Glan valley here and leads to Kusel and Neunkirchen in the Saarland. Bundesstraße 423 leads through the middle Glan valley by way of Homburg and Zweibrücken to the French border near Sarreguemines. Another road leads through the Reichenbach valley to Kaiserslautern.

Serving nearby Altenglan is Altenglan station on the Landstuhl–Kusel railway. There are hourly trains at this station throughout the day, namely Regionalbahn service RB 67 between Kaiserslautern and Kusel, named Glantalbahn after a former railway line that shared a stretch of its tracks with the Landstuhl–Kusel railway.

=== Verbandsgemeinde institutions ===
Available among Verbandsgemeinde institutions are a Regionale Schule, a heated swimming pool for sport and leisure, the Verbandsgemeinde administration and public works and the fire brigade.

=== Education ===
The first efforts on the municipality's part to set up a school were undertaken even before the Thirty Years' War. These efforts, though, were forever foundering for lack of any rooms designed for school classes and, perhaps worse, for lack of anybody who could work as a teacher. Only in 1694 – several decades after the Thirty Years' War – did schooling at last begin in Altenglan, although an actual schoolhouse was not dedicated until 1740. It stood at the end of the village, just outside the graveyard. While surrounding villages had only winter schools (schools geared towards agricultural communities’ practical needs, held in the winter, when farm families had a bit more time to spare), Altenglan's school had year-round classes, and so children from those outlying villages came to school in Altenglan in the warmer months. In the course of the 19th century, the school acquired a third class. On the site of the old schoolhouse, a new, bigger building arose in 1828. Only after the Second World War, however, could a fourth class be added. Beginning in 1962, children from several neighbouring villages once again attended classes in Altenglan when attempts to set up a central school had been carried to fruition. The 1969 school reform split Grundschule (primary school) and Hauptschule. All children from Hauptschulen in the Verbandsgemeinde were gathered together in the 18 classes at the new school building. A central primary school came into being at Rammelsbach. The Altenglan Hauptschule introduced the 10th school year early and today has the status of a Regionale Schule. As for adult education, Altenglan has a location of the Kreisvolkshochschule Kusel.

There are also two kindergartens in Altenglan, the Protestantische Kindergarten in Altenglan and the municipal kindergarten in Mühlbach.

=== Firefighting ===
Located in Altenglan is the Verbandsgemeinde firefighting base. Altenglan's volunteer fire brigade has existed since 1880 and thus celebrated its 125th anniversary in September 2005. The youth fire brigade has existed since 1980 and hence celebrated its 25th anniversary in the same year. From here, all deployments, even ones handled by other local brigades, are backed up by the deployment centre at the Altenglan fire station. Each year, the Altenglan fire brigade handles more than 100 deployments. The number of firefighters, however, is shrinking steadily, as it is in other Verbandsgemeinden, leading thus far to the closure of three local fire stations in the Verbandsgemeinde of Altenglan.

== Famous people ==
=== Sons and daughters of the town ===
- Heinrich Müller (1892–1968), architect of the Postbauschule
- Rainer Hamm (1943– ), criminal defence lawyer and professor of criminal law.
- Jörg Matheis (1970– ), author
