= Haschbach am Remigiusberg =

- Municipality
- Coat of arms

- Location of Haschbach am Remigiusberg within Kusel district
- Interactive map of Haschbach am Remigiusberg
- Location within Germany Location within Rhineland-Palatinate
- Coordinates: 49°31′26″N 7°25′47″E
- Country: Germany
- State: Rhineland-Palatinate
- District: Kusel
- Municipal assoc.: Kusel-Altenglan

Government
  - Mayor (2019–24): Klaus Schubinski

Area
  - Total: 4.02 km^{2} (1.55 sq mi)
- Elevation: 240 m (790 ft)

Population (2025-12-31)
  - Total: 681
  - Density: 169/km^{2} (439/sq mi)
- Time zone: UTC+01:00 (CET)
  - Summer (DST): UTC+02:00 (CEST)
- Postal codes: 66871
- Dialling codes: 06381
- Vehicle registration: KUS
- Website: www.haschbach-am-remigiusberg.de

Haschbach am Remigiusberg is an Ortsgemeinde – a municipality belonging to a Verbandsgemeinde, a kind of collective municipality – in the Kusel district in Rhineland-Palatinate, Germany. It belongs to the Verbandsgemeinde of Kusel-Altenglan, whose seat is in Kusel.

== Geography ==
=== Location ===
The municipality lies in a hollow on the upper reaches of the Haschbach at the western foot of the Remigiusberg hill in the Western Palatinate, roughly 4 km southeast of Kusel. To the east lies the river Glan, into which the Haschbach flows. The municipality's elevation is roughly 260 m above sea level. The heights around the municipal area reach 375 m above sea level at the Langenberg to the west and 368 m above sea level at the Remigiusberg, which with its church and Michelsburg castle ruin is said to be a landmark of the Westrich, a historic region that encompasses areas in both Germany and France. Found mainly in the Remigiusberg area are great melaphyre quarries. The municipal area measures 402 ha, of which 14.6 ha is built up and 83 ha is wooded.

=== Neighbouring municipalities ===
Haschbach am Remigiusberg borders in the north the municipality of Rammelsbach, in the east on the municipality of Theisbergstegen, in the south on the municipality of Etschberg, in the southwest on the municipality of Schellweiler and in the west on the town of Kusel. Haschbach am Remigiusberg also meets the municipality of Altenglan at a single point in the northeast.

=== Constituent communities ===
Also belonging to Haschbach am Remigiusberg is the outlying homestead of Remigiusberg.

=== Municipality’s layout ===
Running through Haschbach is Hauptstraße (“Main Street”), which leads from Kusel to Theisbergstegen. The built-up area spreads up towards the Remigiusberg northeast of this street, while to the southwest it does likewise up towards the Langenberg. Besides the farmhouses with single roof ridges that are typical of the Westrich, there are also many simple workers’ houses. New building zones are found mainly in the south and west. The old church and castle ruin on the Remigiusberg as well as the Potzberg farther to the east offer a view over the village. Standing on the road leading to the Remigiusberg is a small country chapel from the late 19th century. The sporting ground lies towards the northwest, right at the municipal boundary with Kusel. On the road to Rammelsbach, outside the built-up area, lies the graveyard.

== History ==
=== Antiquity ===
The land both nearer Haschbach and somewhat farther away was settled in the late New Stone Age, the Bronze Age, the Iron Age and Roman times, bearing witness to which are archaeological finds from all the surrounding municipalities. In Haschbach itself, down from the village, going towards Theisbergstegen, early work on a quarry on both sides of the road unearthed an urn-grave burying ground, which likely dates from La Tène times.

=== Middle Ages ===
Haschbach lay in the so-called Remigiusland, and likely arose in the 11th century, and thus some 100 years before the first documentary mention from 1149. An exact year of founding, though, cannot be determined. The Remigiusland was originally part of the Imperial Domain (Reichsland) around Kaiserslautern, but was split away from it about AD 590 and likely given by Frankish King Childebert II to Bishop Egidius of Reims as a donation. A story that already appeared in the Archbishopric's history books in the Middle Ages that had King Clovis I making the donation to Bishop Remigius (Saint Remigius) himself is now no longer accepted by historians. In 952, the Bishopric of Reims transferred its holdings around Kusel – the Remigiusland – to the Abbey of Saint-Remi, also in Reims. In 1112, Count Gerlach I, whose father was a count from the Nahegau, founded the new County of Veldenz, also belonging to which, as a Vogtei, was the Remigiusland. At this time, monks from Reims, who in all likelihood had considered the town of Kusel their base since the Remigiusland was founded, may even have built the Monastery on the Remigiusberg. The monastery had its first documentary mention in 1127. Before it was founded, nobles from a neighbouring region had unlawfully built on the mountain a castle, which against a payment of compensation was now torn down. The original Latin text reads: “utili et salubri consilio sibi posterisque providentes eundem montem licet suum munitionem pretio redemerunt et destructo castro monasterium sibi cum claustralibus officinis ibidem construxerunt,…”. One of the invaders, likely a knight named Albert, himself ruefully joined the monastery. Tensions between the provosts at the Saint-Remi branch monastery on the Remigiusberg and the Counts of Veldenz arose soon after the monastery's founding and lasted centuries. According to the 1149 document that also mentions the name of the village of Haschbach for the first time (as Habbach), a delegation from the Abbey of Saint-Remi and the branch monastery on the Remigiusberg complained to King Conrad III about disputes between the Counts of Veldenz and the monastery. King Conrad issued a legal pronouncement in the monastery's favour, but this was never quite brought into force. Four of Count Gerlach's successors likewise bore the name Gerlach. Gerlach V died in 1259 after taking part in a mission to Castile, leaving behind a young daughter named Agnes. Serving as Agnes's regent was Count Heinrich of Zweibrücken, who was her grandfather and her late father's father-in-law. To safeguard the County of Veldenz, Count Heinrich had several castles built, thus flouting the monks at the Remigiusberg and also the Michelsburg, the castle right next to the monastery. In various Veldenz documents, the Michelsburg is mentioned. In 1387 and 1390, Count Friedrich II of Veldenz acknowledged that he had been enfeoffed with, among other things, Sant Michelsberg by Count Palatine Ruprecht the Elder. A similar thing was acknowledged in 1437 by Count Friedrich III of Veldenz with regard to his overlord Count Palatine Ludwig. This feudal arrangement shows that the Counts of Veldenz did not hold their fief directly from the king, but rather through the Electors Palatine who served as their overlords. Count Friedrich III was the last from the Hohengeroldseck family to rule Veldenz - that male line died out with him in 1444, and the county passed to his son-in-law Stephen, Count Palatine of Simmern-Zweibrücken (son of Rupert, King of Germany), widower of Frederick's daughter, Anna of Veldenz. Stephen, combining his lands, created the new County Palatine of Zweibrücken, which in the fullness of time came to be known as the Duchy of Palatinate-Zweibrücken. Stephen chose the town of Zweibrücken as comital residence.

=== Modern times ===
The Counts Palatine (Dukes) of Zweibrücken introduced the Reformation according to Martin Luther’s teachings to their subjects beginning in 1523, and in 1588, John I, Count Palatine of Zweibrücken forced his subjects to convert to John Calvin’s Reformed teachings (Calvinism). In 1543, Wolfgang, Count Palatine of Zweibrücken gave the County of Veldenz to his uncle and former regent, Rupert. During his regency, Rupert had resided at the castle on the Remigiusberg, the Michelsburg, which was forthwith swallowed into his new county's domain. The by now Lutheran church once belonging to the monastery, which had suffered dissolution in the time of the Reformation, served the princely family of Palatinate-Veldenz as a burying place. The village of Haschbach itself at first remained with the Duchy of Zweibrücken, but nevertheless likewise ended up with the newer County of Veldenz under the terms of the Recess of Meisenheim, proclaimed on 1 August 1600. As Lehmann wrote in 1867, “In August however, our Prince established two agreements with Georg Hannsen’s son, Count Palatine Georg Gustav of Veldenz; in the first, he transferred to the said count the mills at Mühlbach and Oberstaufenbach, two woods named Hochwald and Steinchen, then the villages of Hasbach (Haschbach) and Stegen, as well as many serfs and certain tithes, against which he (the Prince) received his share of Alsenz, the village of Reichartsweiler, the Veldenz share of the tithes in the Stolzenberg Valley along with many serfs.” The Thirty Years' War and French King Louis XIV's wars of conquest exacted great losses, and for a while, the village would have been almost empty of people. Newcomers boosted the population figures. The later Veldenz line died out with Count Palatine Leopold Ludwig's death in 1694. There then ensued a dispute over the succession between Palatinate-Zweibrücken and Electoral Palatinate, which was settled in the latter's favour by the 1731 Treaty of Marburg. Under its terms, the village of Haschbach along with the castle and the church were held by Electoral Palatinate until the country was occupied by French Revolutionary troops. During the 18th century, having been mentioned as early as 1590, the Remigiusberg Estate lay below the monastery and the castle, held by the House of Remigiusberg, that is, the Counts Palatine of Veldenz-Lichtenstein and from 1731 the Prince-Electors of the Palatinate. Bit by bit, not always without displeasure, the estate was given to various other landholders. In the time of the French Revolution, the French authorities seized all Electoral holdings as national property. The estate was sold to private buyers, but nevertheless did not last much longer: the original cadastral survey done in Bavarian times, not many years later, described it as a ruin.

==== Recent times ====
During the time of annexation of the German lands on the Rhine’s left bank by France, Haschbach belonged within the French First Republic – and then later within the First French Empire under Napoleon – to the Department of Sarre, the Arrondissement of Birkenfeld, the Canton of Kusel and the Mairie (“Mayoralty”) of Quirnbach. After the French were driven out, Haschbach then belonged within the Kingdom of Bavaria (to which the Congress of Vienna had awarded the Palatinate) to the Landkommissariat (district) and Canton of Kusel, and to a Bürgermeisterei (“mayoralty”) whose name changed according to where the mayor lived – sometimes in Godelhausen and sometimes in Theisbergstegen (the former is today a constituent community of the latter).

“From Theisbergstegen, through a narrow, wooded mountain gap we reach the hamlet of Haschbach, whose broadly strewn homesteads gleam with bright red tile roofs over the plateau, over which, towards the east the mountain ridge already described looms.”

Thus did Franz Xaver Remling report on a visit to the Remigiusberg in 1850. In the late 1920s and early 1930s, the NSDAP (Nazi Party) was becoming quite popular in Haschbach. In the 1928 Reichstag elections, only 0.6% of the local votes went to Adolf Hitler’s party, but by the 1930 Reichstag elections, this had grown to 11.3%. By the time of the 1933 Reichstag elections, after Hitler had already seized power, local support for the Nazis had swollen to 31.7%. Hitler’s success in these elections paved the way for his Enabling Act of 1933 (Ermächtigungsgesetz), thus starting the Third Reich in earnest. Once the state of Rhineland-Palatinate had been founded after the Second World War and the Palatinate had been split away from Bavaria, the broader territorial arrangements did not change at first, although from 1945 to 1949, Haschbach was itself seat of the mayoralty. Only with administrative restructuring in 1968 did Haschbach pass as an Ortsgemeinde to the newly founded Verbandsgemeinde of Kusel, with effect from 1972. In 1959, the municipality’s name, which hitherto had been simply Haschbach, was lengthened to the current form, Haschbach am Remigiusberg, to avoid confusion with Haschbach am Glan, an outlying centre of Henschtal, which lies nearby, in the same district.

=== Population development ===
Until the early 20th century, the villagers earned their livelihoods mainly at agriculture, although even before this, there had been workers (miners, for instance). With the rise of industry, in this region the foremost industry being stone quarrying, towards the end of the 19th century, social change became constant. Out of the farming village of Haschbach grew a village of stoneworkers where many workers long kept at their farming as a secondary occupation. They jokingly called themselves Steinarbeiterbauern – “stoneworker-farmers”. In time, though, quarrying, too, met with hard times, and rationalization measures meant that fewer workers were needed. It was therefore not hard to see that Haschbach's future would hold neither farmers nor stoneworkers. Indeed, of the 70 agricultural operations, run as either a main or secondary occupation, that existed in Haschbach in 1950, none is still in business. All were either closed or given up. While the quarry drew workers from outside the village in its heyday, today, more and more people from Haschbach must seek work elsewhere, commuting to Kusel and Kaiserslautern, or even farther afield to other industrial centres. There is little in the way of earning opportunities in Haschbach itself, for even service industries are nowadays found mostly outside the village. Today the village is held to be an aspiring rural residential community, defined by a good quality of living, and also by its proximity to the town of Kusel. The population figures show, from the early 19th century, a steady upward trend lasting through to 2000. Recently, though, stagnation seems to have set in. It is unknown how long this will last.

The following table shows population development over the centuries for Haschbach am Remigiusberg, with some figures broken down by religious denomination:

Year	1825	1835	1871	1905	1939	1961	1998	2003	2008
Total	271	297	307	382	546	618	775	707	715
Catholic	94					224			
Evangelical	177					372			
Other	–					22			

=== Municipality’s name ===
The name “Haschbach” may derive from the Old High German hase, which meant – as the same word in Modern High German still means – “hare”, which would mean that the name as a whole means “Harebrook”. Indeed, a pattern is seen in other placenames combining an animal's name with the very common —bach ending: Rehbach, Hirschbach, Fuchsbach (“Hindbrook”, “Hartbrook”, “Foxbrook”), etc. It was, however, the brook (Bach) itself that first bore the name. Only later was the name given the village that sprang up alongside.

The first syllable may, on the other hand, be a colour, from the Germanic hasa, hasan (Old English hasu), meaning “grey”, which would mean that the name as a whole means “Greybrook”. If so, another pattern is seen when the name is put alongside Blaubach, Schwarzbach, Rotenbach (“Bluebrook”, “Blackbrook”, “Redbrook”), etc.

Researchers Dolch and Greule put forth a further idea. They do not rule out that the first syllable in the name “Haschbach” may derive from an old German personal name that only accidentally mutated into something meaning “Harebrook”.

Even the oldest records of the name do not go far enough back, and are not clear enough, for the name's actual meaning to be precisely determined. Whatever its meaning or roots, the municipality's name underwent many changes over the ages:

Year	Name
1149	Habbach
1150	Casebach
1267	Hasebach
1364	Haßbach
1365	Haszbach unter dem Remigiusberg
1377	Hayspach
1378	Happach
1379	Hazebach
1380	Haspach
1381	Haispach
1382	Haszbach unter dem Remigiusberg
1383	Haschbach
1384	Remigs-Haschbach
1385	Hasbach, Aspach, Remigshaspach
1386	Remis Aspach
1387	Hasbach, or Remigshaspach
1388	Haschbach
1389	Haschbach
1440	Hasbach
1446	Happach
1456	Hazebach
1546	Haßbach
1588	Haßbach
1788	Remigshaspach
1837	Haschbach

Since about 1824, the spelling has been the modern one. Locally, it is pronounced with a “long A” (German pronunciation: [ˈhaːʃbax]).

The addition of the tag “am Remigiusberg” to the municipality's name came after council decided on 18 January 1959 to apply to change the name officially. A certificate granting this was issued on 4 November of the same year by the Rhineland-Palatinate Ministry of the Interior pursuant to “§ 4 Abs. 3” (Section 4, Paragraph 3) of the Gemeindeordnung.

=== Vanished villages ===
In the municipality's southwest, near where the Münchbach rises, once stood a small village named Wetzenhausen. It was a very small place that only had its first documentary mention in the 16th century, but then late that same century, Johannes Hoffmann described it as an untergegangene Dorfstatt – a “lost village place”. This village's name can be seen in rural cadastral toponyms such as Wetschhausen or Welschhausen. The name itself might originally have referred to a man named Wezzo, and therefore would have meant “Wezzo’s Farm” or “Wezzo’s House”.

== Religion ==
While Haschbach, like all other villages in the Remigiusland had dues to pay to the Monastery on the Remigiusberg, it nonetheless belonged according to ecclesiastical organization to the Diocese of Mainz. The Monastery on the Remigiusberg arose as a holding of first the Bishopric of Reims and then later the Abbey of Saint-Remi only in the earlier half of the 12th century, and all the time it had great difficulties asserting itself over the secular lordship. In the time of the Reformation, following the principle of cuius regio, eius religio, the Haschbach villagers, along with all subjects of the Duchy of Palatinate-Zweibrücken, adopted the Lutheran faith. In 1550, the Abbey of Saint-Remi under Abbot Robert de Lenoncourt sold the Remigiusland to the Duchy of Palatinate-Zweibrücken for a price of 8,500 Rhenish guilders, thus secularizing the Abbey. The Abbey's last provost, Johannes Peuchet, had died decades earlier, in 1520, but he had had a son out of wedlock who bore the same name, and who served in both Baumholder and Kusel as a Lutheran pastor. The church on the mountain, which had already been favoured as a burying place back in the time of the earlier Counts of Veldenz, was preserved and now members of this new County of Palatinate-Veldenz were buried here, too. During the Thirty Years' War, Benedictine monks temporarily moved into the monastery. Shortly thereafter, the buildings began to fall into disrepair. After the Thirty Years' War and during French King Louis XIV's wars of conquest, but mainly after 1713 after the County of Palatinate-Veldenz had passed to Electoral Palatinate, the Catholic faith once again began to spread in Haschbach and elsewhere. The church on the Remigiusberg was assigned to the Catholics in 1724, and in 1744, the autonomous parish of St. Remigius Remigiusberg came into being. The church's maintenance was very costly, which was why even before the French Revolution a few zinc coffins from the Electoral crypt at the provostry church were sold so that the needed renovation work could be done. When the French Revolution came, though, the comital burial place was utterly destroyed. In very recent times, those seeking to sort and identify the heaped-up comital bones have enjoyed some success. Under the Kings of Bavaria, the church was renovated and assigned as the Theisbergstegen Catholic congregation's community church. Catholic and Evangelical villagers nowadays belong to the corresponding church communities in Theisbergstegen and the corresponding deaconries of Kusel.

== Politics ==
=== Municipal council ===
The council is made up of 12 council members, who were elected by majority vote at the municipal election held on 7 June 2009, and the honorary mayor as chairman.

=== Mayor ===
Haschbach am Remigiusberg's mayor is Klaus Schubinski.

=== Coat of arms ===
The German blazon reads: Von Blau und Silber geviert, oben rechts eine silberne Kirche mit gotischem Schiff und romanischem Turm mit barocker Haube, oben links ein rotbewehrter und rotbezungter blauer Löwe, unten rechts eine doppeltürmige blaue Zinnenburg mit Tor und unten links ein silberner Fels.

The municipality's arms might in English heraldic language be described thus: Quarterly first azure a church with Gothic nave and Romanesque tower with Baroque roof argent, second argent a lion rampant of the first armed and langued gules, third argent a castle gateway with flanking towers embattled of the first and fourth azure issuant from base a crag of the second.

Looming over Haschbach is the Remigiusberg, the hub of the Remigiusland with its Propsteikirche (“Provostry Church”) and Michaelsburg (castle) held by the former Vögte, the Counts of Veldenz. The charges in the first three quarters stand for them (the lion for the Counts themselves). This mountain was, however, under threat from stone quarrying, once the mainstay of Haschbach's livelihood. The charge in sinister base, the crag, was chosen for this reason.

The arms have been borne since 5 July 1978 when they were approved by the now abolished Regierungsbezirk administration in Neustadt an der Weinstraße.

== Culture and sightseeing ==
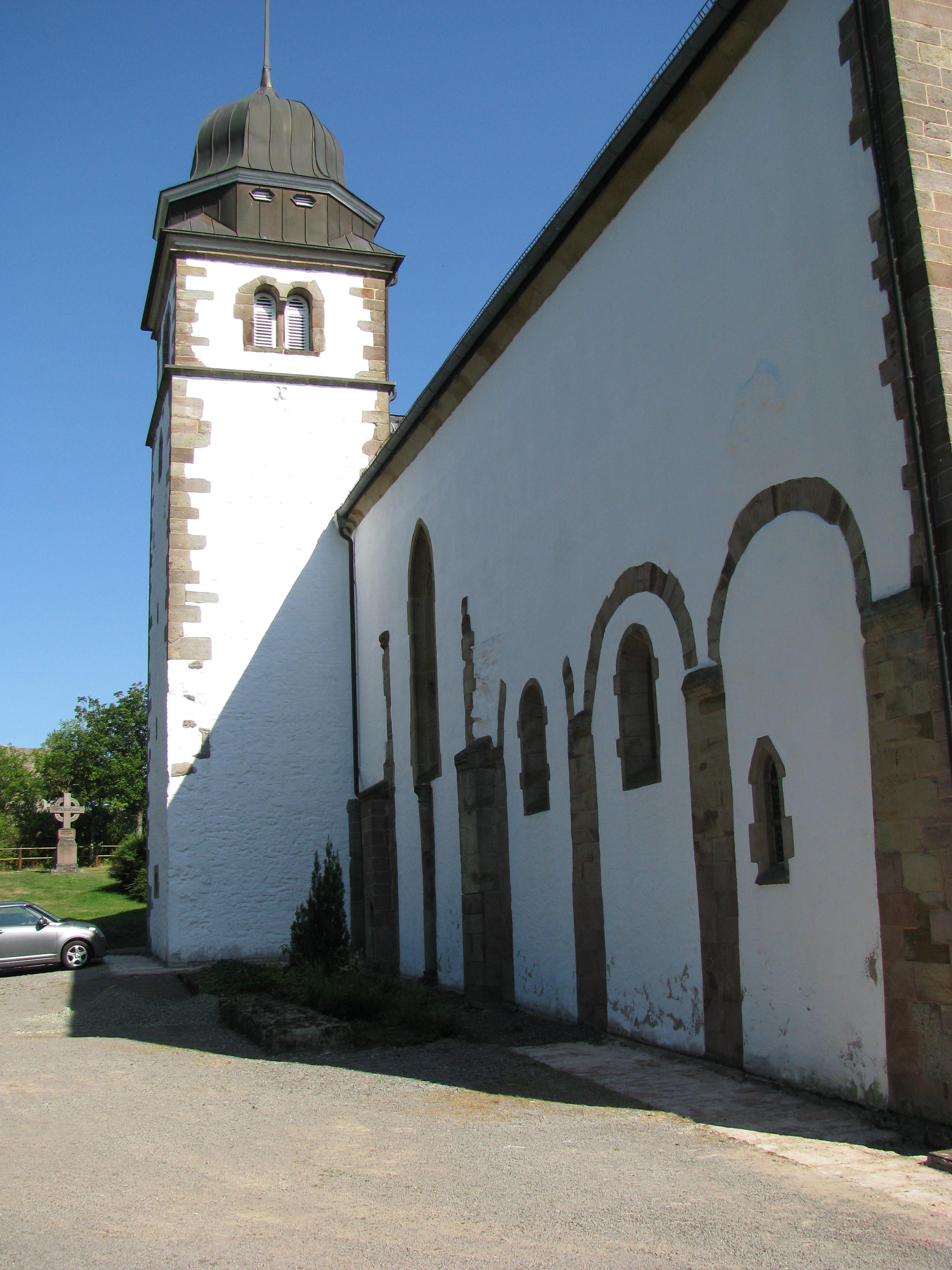
Propsteikirche

=== Buildings ===
The following are listed buildings or sites in Rhineland-Palatinate’s Directory of Cultural Monuments:

- Hauptstraße 34 – former school; eleven-axis sandstone-framed plastered building, 1928, architect Hermann Kohl, Kaiserslautern
- Westliche Münchtalstraße (no number) – spring chamber; building made out of sandstone slabs, 18th century
- Former Provostry Church (Propsteikirche), Remigiusbergstraße – crossing pillars, parts of the nave arcades and north flanking quire tower from the original building, 12th century; portal and tracery windows of the west façade, latter half of the 13th century; quire about 1330; chapel possibly from the 15th century; belfry with welsche Haube, 18th century, façade mainly from 1845; rectory, 1842/1843, architect Johann Schmeisser, Kusel
- Chapel in the cadastral area of Tunnelplatz, halfway to the Remigiusberg – stone block building with tent roof, 1881
- Michelsburg (monumental zone) – ruin, small castle complex, built about 1260 by Count Heinrich II of Veldenz, destroyed in 1689; high wall, shielding wall, north defensive wall, remnants of a round tower; monument to Saint Remigius, marked 1853, two neck ditches

=== Natural monuments ===
Haschbach am Remigiusberg has an old oaktree, the Hubertuseiche, which has been described as “possibly the oddest shape of tree in the Westrich”. It is very gnarled, and a writer named Julius Wilde wrote about it in 1936, naming it the Warzeneiche (“Wart Oak”). The “warts” are of course burrs. These have made any circumferential measurement of the tree rather problematic, for they have quite markedly distorted the trunk's shape: at 80 cm above the ground, the tree's girth is 4.50 m; only a bit higher, at chest-level, it measures 5.51 m; at its fattest point, about 2 m above the ground, the tree's girth reaches 6 m precisely. The Hubertuseiche stands at the edge of the Feistwald about 50 m from the Haschbach sporting ground over towards the municipal limit with Kusel.

=== Regular events ===
Haschbach holds its kermis (church consecration festival, locally known as the Kerb) on the third weekend in July. Formerly, the festival was held in two dancehalls, but now it takes place under a great marquee. The event still features the Straußbuben (“bouquet lads”) and nowadays also Straußmädchen (girls with the same function) who parade through the village, put the Kerwestrauß (“kermis bouquet”) up and hold the Straußrede (“bouquet speech”).

=== Clubs ===
The following clubs exist in Haschbach am Remigiusberg:

- Angelsportverein – angling (conducts its activities at the pond at the former quarry)
- FCK-Fan-Club "Belzekäppcher" – 1. FC Kaiserslautern fan club
- Förderverein der Freiwilligen Feuerwehr – volunteer fire brigade promotional association
- Freizeitclub – leisure club
- Katholische Frauengemeinschaft der Pfarrei Remigiusberg – Catholic parish women's association
- Landfrauenverein – countrywomen's club
- Männergesangverein "Frohsinn" – men’s singing club (no longer active)
- Obst- und Gartenbauverein – fruitgrowing and gardening
- SPD-Ortsverein – Social Democratic Party of Germany local chapter
- Sportverein – sport club
- VdK-Ortsgruppe Haschbach - Theisbergstegen – VdK local chapter (social advocacy group)

=== Culture ===
The local clubs could be said to be the village’s cultural sponsors. Nevertheless, there are also extensive cultural offerings in the district seat of Kusel, only 3 km away, with, among other things, its concerts and theatrical productions, the folk high school’s events and the district library.

== Economy and infrastructure ==
=== Economic structure ===
The early inhabitants earned their living, as everywhere else, through farming. They led lives full of hardship and deprivation. Eventually, though, some found work as lime burners at brickworks around the Remigiusberg, as miners in the surrounding coal and mercury mines or as textile workers in the new mills in Kusel. Others by then might already have worked at traditional occupations such as smith, cabinetmaker, cobbler, mason and carpenter.

Agriculture in Haschbach now, however, only plays a subordinate role in the village’s economic life. Formerly the odd villager worked at the mines in the surrounding area; with the rise of the stone industry on the Dimpel in Rammelsbach and on the Remigiusberg, quarrymen predominated. Within municipal limits were three hard-stone quarries, one of which was under municipal ownership. The oldest quarry, on the left side of the road that leads to Theisbergstegen was opened in 1868 by a schoolteacher, and later ended up under the ownership of several private firms. The quarry had a crusher and until 1954 a ropeway link to the railway station at Theisbergstegen. At this time, almost one hundred workers from Haschbach and the surrounding area were employed. About 1950, this quarry was shut down. The municipally owned quarry on the other side of the road was opened in 1877 and had as many as 130 workers about 1938. At this quarry, work ceased soon after the Second World War. On its lands, a pond arose. The third quarry was run from 1902 to 1930 in the heights of the Remigiusberg between the church and the Michelsburg (castle). This one had to shut down in 1930 for reasons relating to monument protection.

Shortly before the First World War, some 80 of the village’s inhabitants were employed at the stone quarries. By this time, there were only 21 fulltime farmers. Beyond this, the local employment picture included 2 cobblers, 1 cabinetmaker, 1 tailor, 2 blacksmiths, 1 stonemason, 1 midwife, 1 baker, 1 barber-surgeon, 3 innkeepers, 1 butcher, 1 meat inspector, 2 grocers and 1 confectioner.

After the Second World War and the downsizing of the workforce at the stone quarries, many sought work in the Saarland’s coalmines, service positions with the United States Armed Forces, jobs in administration and positions in retail shops and the industrial works in the surrounding area, both nearby and farther afield. The shift in economic structure since the war has wrought a great change in Haschbach am Remigiusberg. The village is now mainly residential.

=== Education ===
The earliest beginnings of efforts to establish a school in Haschbach in the early 17th century could not be brought to fruition mainly because of the frightful events of the Thirty Years' War. Owing to Haschbach’s incorporation into the County Palatine of Veldenz, very little information has reached the present day from the time before the 19th century. Something is, however, known about school life for Haschbach children during the course of the 18th century. Until the beginning of the 19th century, Haschbach schoolchildren attended classes in Theisbergstegen. Haschbach’s first schoolhouse was opened in 1821. It did not have to be built, for the municipality simply bought an existing house and used it as a schoolhouse. A purpose-built schoolhouse, which the municipality had built, finally arose in 1878 with one classroom, a teacher’s dwelling, a stable and a barn. At that time, farming served the teacher as a secondary occupation. Only in 1928 did another schoolhouse arise, one that truly earned its name as such. It had two classrooms with central heating, and even a public bath was housed in the building. The first known teacher, from 1821 to 1837, was Georg Adam Klensch. For the time that followed, all teachers’ names are known from their appearance in school journals. Some were known well beyond the village. Friedrich Forster, teacher in Haschbach from 1843 to 1850, was called to account by the Bavarian government for his participation in the 1849 Palatine Uprising. Fritz Kleinschmidt (1926-1929), as a well known local historian, long tended the Stadt- und Heimatmuseum (“Town and Local History Museum”) in Kusel. After the Second World War, Hans Moster (1937-1939) led the well known Pfälzer Weinkehlchen (a singing club). Hermann Cassel, who compiled a paper about school in Haschbach, came in 1947. In 1966, he successfully vied for the post of headmaster at the newly formed Hauptschule in Altenglan. At this time, the Haschbach school was closed, and schoolchildren have been attending the combination primary school-Hauptschule in Kusel ever since. Also found in the district seat is every other kind of school, including a school for students with learning difficulties and a school for mentally handicapped students. For a time, the Kusel primary school used the classrooms in Haschbach for external classes. Since then, the old schoolhouse has become a village community centre.

=== Transport ===
Haschbach lies on the linking road between Kusel and Theisbergstegen. The nearest stations are Kusel station, about 3 km to the north, and Theisbergstegen, about 3 km to the southeast. Kusel is the terminus of the Landstuhl–Kusel railway and both stations are served by Regionalbahn service RB 67, called the Glantalbahn (the name of which refers to the Glan Valley Railway, which shared some of the route of the Landstuhl–Kusel line, including Theisbergstegen station). To the southwest runs the Autobahn A 62 (Kaiserslautern–Trier), and the nearest interchange, “Kusel”, lies some 5 km away from the village.

== Famous people ==
=== Sons and daughters of the town ===
- Georg Gustav (1564–1634), Count Palatine of Veldenz
