= Rammelsbach =

- Municipality
- Coat of arms

- Location of Rammelsbach within Kusel district
- Interactive map of Rammelsbach
- Location within Germany Location within Rhineland-Palatinate
- Coordinates: 49°32′40.12″N 7°26′37.88″E
- Country: Germany
- State: Rhineland-Palatinate
- District: Kusel
- Municipal assoc.: Kusel-Altenglan

Government
  - Mayor (2019–24): Thomas Danneck

Area
  - Total: 2.64 km^{2} (1.02 sq mi)
- Elevation: 212 m (696 ft)

Population (2025-12-31)
  - Total: 1,462
  - Density: 554/km^{2} (1,430/sq mi)
- Time zone: UTC+01:00 (CET)
  - Summer (DST): UTC+02:00 (CEST)
- Postal codes: 66887
- Dialling codes: 06381
- Vehicle registration: KUS
- Website: www.rammelsbach.de

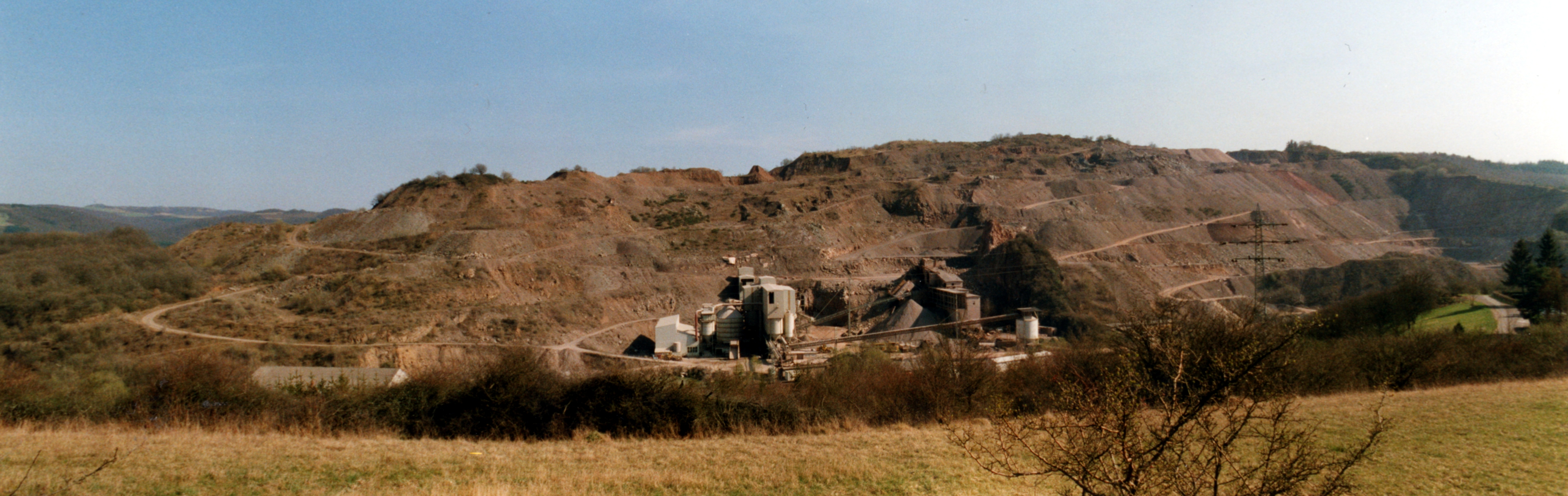
The Rammelsbach quarry (1998)

Rammelsbach is an Ortsgemeinde – a municipality belonging to a Verbandsgemeinde, a kind of collective municipality – in the Kusel district in Rhineland-Palatinate, Germany. It belongs to the Verbandsgemeinde of Kusel-Altenglan, whose seat is in Kusel.

== Geography ==
=== Location ===
The municipality lies within the Kusel Musikantenland (“Minstrels’ Land”) in the Western Palatinate. Rammelsbach lies in the Kuselbach valley between Kusel and Altenglan and also stretches into the valley of the Rammelsbach, which flows to the Kuselbach from the south. In its upper reaches, the Rammelsbach is known as the Tiefenbach. The Kuselbach valley floor lies at 215 m above sea level. Prominent elevations on the Kuselbach's right bank are the Rammelsbacher Kopf (256 m) and the Remigiusberg (368 m), while over on the left bank is the Hinzigberg, which near the Schlichterhof reaches a height of almost 300 m. The great basalt quarry, locally known as “Dimpel”, spreads over the whole Rammelsbacher Kopf. An electronics factory stands in the village's west end between Bundesstraße 420 and the Kuselbach. The industrial lands in this area have over time come to abut those in Kusel. The municipal area measures 264 ha, of which 31 ha is wooded.

=== Neighbouring municipalities ===
Rammelsbach borders in the north and east on the municipality of Altenglan, in the south on the municipality of Haschbach am Remigiusberg and in the west on the town of Kusel. Rammelsbach also meets the municipality of Theisbergstegen at a single point in the southeast.

=== Constituent communities ===
Also belonging to Rammelsbach are the outlying homesteads of Haus Menges, Kreuzhof, Rechenhäuschen and Schlichterhof.

=== Municipality’s layout ===
Rammelsbach was originally made up of only a few houses and was even once called the Rammelsbacher Hof (“estate” or “farm”). The village core spread out until the 19th century over both banks of the Rammelsbach, and only the mill stood on the Kuselbach. Beginning in the 17th century, the village began to spread outwards, but only slowly at first. A small outlying centre arose in the 19th century, the Rechenhäuschen, on the Kuselbach's left bank. This centre has since grown together with the village itself. Another outlying centre, the Schlichterhof, is an Aussiedlerhof, an agricultural settlement established after the Second World War to increase food production. Even by 1819, the village of Rammelsbach only had 30 houses. The original cadastral survey done in 1848 showed that Rammelsbach had grown by 10 houses. Since the villagers earned their livelihoods mainly at farming through to the mid 19th century, old farmhouses can still be spotted in the original village core, all of them Einfirsthäuser (“single-roof-ridge houses”), as was customary in the Westrich, an historic region that encompasses areas in both Germany and France. After the great stone quarry was opened in 1868, the village began growing rather quickly. About 1888, new houses sprang up on the old village street leading to the bridge, and even beyond the bridge all the way to the road running through the Kuselbach valley. Beginning in 1894, the valley location down at the Kuselbach was opened for building. About 1901, Steinbruchstraße (“Quarry Street”) was built, as was what is nowadays called Friedrich-Ebert-Straße about 1905. Beginning in 1902, it was mainly workers who settled on the slopes of the lower Hinzigberg. More new houses were built on Flurstraße and Höhweg at about the turn of the 20th century, although these streets were not actually expanded until 1932. Since the Second World War, particular effort has gone into opening further new residential areas. There came the “Tiefenbachsiedlung” and the new housing estate on the upper Hinzigberg. Some gaps in the built-up area were opened to building, and thus the building in the already existing streets was expanded. Rammelsbach is first and foremost a residential community. The built-up parts of the municipality could to a great extent be described as workers’ settlements. The graveyard stretches over a slope on the Kuselbach's left bank in the village's east end. The Evangelical church stands nearby, while the Catholic church stands in a new building zone on a slope on the Kuselbach's right bank. Both churches were built in 1954. The building that is now the primary school for the Verbandsgemeinde of Altenglan came into being in 1964 at first as a replacement for three other schoolhouses in the village. Nearby stands the kindergarten. A great sporting ground can be found in the village's south, west of the road leading to Haschbach am Remigiusberg. A shooting sport clubhouse with a shooting range stands near the Rechenhäuschen.

== History ==
=== Antiquity ===
After the First World War, a cylindrical stone hatchet made of diorite was found on the Rammelsbacher Kopf that dated from the New Stone Age. During building work on the Catholic church in 1954, workers unearthed a great many Roman-era potsherds. It is likely that this church now stands on the foundations of a Gallo-Roman villa rustica.

=== Middle Ages ===
Rammelsbach lay in the Remigiusland. While it is assumed that the places Kusel and Altenglan already existed by the time that this landhold was donated to the Bishop of Reims, likely about 590 by King Childebert II to Bishop Egidius (not to be confused with Saint Giles, also sometimes known as Egidius), Rammelsbach was only founded some 200 years after this donation. In the 12th century, the Counts of Veldenz took on the Vogtei over the Remigiusland and founded the County of Veldenz. Rammelsbach and the whole Remigiusland were subject for centuries at once to the Abbey of Saint-Remi in Reims and the Counts of Veldenz. In 1444, the County of Veldenz met its end when Count Friedrich III of Veldenz died without a male heir. His daughter Anna wed King Ruprecht's son Count Palatine Stephan. By uniting his own Palatine holdings with the now otherwise heirless County of Veldenz – his wife had inherited the county, but not her father's title – and by redeeming the hitherto pledged County of Zweibrücken, Stephan founded a new County Palatine, as whose comital residence he chose the town of Zweibrücken: the County Palatine – later Duchy – of Palatinate-Zweibrücken. Rammelsbach now found itself in this state. In 1552, the Dukes of Zweibrücken acquired the Remigiusland through sale, thus becoming the sole rightful owners. In 1364, Rammelsbach had its first documentary mention in a document that Count Heinrich II of Veldenz issued for his son Heinrich III and his wife Loretta of Sponheim. According to details in this document, Rammelsbach then belonged to the Veldenz Unteramt of Brücken/Altenglan. In Castle Lichtenberg's taxation rolls, a man named Hans von Rammelsbach was mentioned about 1450.

=== Modern times ===
In line with Zweibrücken Ducal ecclesiastical policy, the Reformation according to Martin Luther’s teaching was introduced into Rammelsbach about 1537. Beginning in 1588, Count Palatine Johannes I forced all his subjects to convert to Reformed belief as espoused by John Calvin. At the time of the 1609 ecclesiastical visitation, there were seven families with all together 27 inhabitants living in the village. During the Thirty Years' War, the village was utterly destroyed, and only one woman survived the war. Newcomers settled, and repopulation was furthered by French King Louis XIV’s policies later on in the century. At the time of Louis XIV’s politique des Réunions, the Catholic faith once more gained a foothold in the village. Rammelsbach belonged, as before, to Palatinate-Zweibrücken, and would until that state was swept away in the course of the French Revolution.

==== Recent times ====
While limestone had been quarried in the Rammelsbach area since the Middle Ages, a proper limestone industry only developed in the 18th and 19th centuries, contributing to the village’s growth and creating jobs in such occupations as lime burning and goods transport, alongside the traditional farming. Rammelsbach underwent a thorough shift towards being an industrial village after 1886, when large-scale quarrying of basalt began. The population first doubled and then trebled before the 19th century ended. Hard work characterized village life for both men and women. After Revolutionary France had annexed the German lands on the Rhine’s left bank, Rammelsbach lay in the Mairie (“Mayoralty”) of Kusel, the Canton of Kusel, the Arrondissement of Birkenfeld and the Department of Sarre. The village also remained tightly bound with Kusel after it was united with the Kingdom of Bavaria in 1818. It also now belonged to the Landkommissariat (later Bezirksamt, then Landkreis or “district”), Canton and Bürgermeisterei (“Mayoralty”) of Kusel. In the late 1920s and early 1930s, the Nazi Party (NSDAP) did not become quite as popular in Rammelsbach as in some other places in the district. In the 1924 Reichstag elections, only 0.2% of the local votes went to Adolf Hitler’s party, and in the 1928 Reichstag elections, only 2.0% but by the time of the 1933 Reichstag elections, after Hitler had already seized power, the Nazis fared no better than 26% in terms of local support (as against 92.5% in Horschbach or 90% in Ehweiler, for instance). Until 1933, though, the Social Democratic Party of Germany had always enjoyed an absolute majority in federal elections locally, and even though they lost that in this election, they still outpolled the Nazis by quite a hefty margin (38.5%). Nevertheless, Hitler's overall success in these elections paved the way for his Enabling Act of 1933 (Ermächtigungsgesetz), thus starting the Third Reich in earnest. Also in 1933 came another merger with Kusel instigated by the Nazis, but this was undone in 1945, when Rammelsbach once more became a mayoral seat. In 1954, both Rammelsbach's current churches were consecrated. A new schoolhouse was built in 1963, and in 1966, Grundig opened a plant in Rammelsbach. In the course of administrative restructuring in Rhineland-Palatinate, Rammelsbach became an Ortsgemeinde within the Verbandsgemeinde of Altenglan in 1972. The old mayoralty was dissolved and the municipality became one of 16 Ortsgemeinden within the Verbandsgemeinde. In 1984, Grundig closed its Rammelsbach plant, and in 1986, TDK took over Grundig's old workshops. In 1999, it concentrated its Compact Cassette production in Rammelsbach. In 2003, though, TDK closed the workshops and RME (Ritek Media Europe), a daughter company of a Taiwan-based business, moved into the premises.

=== Population development ===
Living in Rammelsbach until the time of the Thirty Years' War were mainly farmers, as in all other villages in the area. In the course of the new settlement that came in the wake of the 17th century's frightful wars, however, the newcomers at first worked in the mines and the several still small stone quarries. Since the mineral products – limestone, coal, paving stones and gravel – had to be transported to users, transport businesses sprang up, especially in the days before the railway came – and some villagers earned their livings doing this. Later, when a great number of workers were employed at the village's only large-scale quarry, more and more people came to settle nearer their jobs. The small farming village was changing ever more noticeably into a workers’ village. Since then, however, the quarry's economic importance to the villagers has shrunk, and it no longer plays a great part in the local economy. Even when new industrial operations located in Rammelsbach, long-term jobs could not be created in great numbers. The local “quarryman” stereotype now belongs to the past as more and more villagers must commute elsewhere to jobs. This development is partly reflected in the population figures. The developmental peak with more than 2,000 inhabitants in the mid 20th century is now bygone, and Rammelsbach's population is now shrinking, as it is in most villages in the area.

The following table shows population development over the centuries for Rammelsbach:

Year	1609	1648	1675	1772	1824	1880	1890	1900	1910	1939	1961	1998	2005
Total	20	1	20	100	309	664	841	1,108	1,575	2,006	2,102	1,952	1,792

=== Municipality’s name ===
In 1364, the village was called Ramelspach, in 1430 Ramelsbach, in 1452 Rammelsbach, in 1588 Rammelsbacher Hof and thereafter always Rammelsbach. For a time it was assumed (by, among others, Ernst Christmann) that the village's name somehow stemmed from the name Remigiusberg, still given a nearby mountain today. This theory, though, has been dismissed. The prefix is now thought to stem from a Germanic name (Rammel, Remmel, Hrabnal or Hrabnil). The ending —bach (“brook”) crops up in many local placenames, and likely means that Rammelsbach was founded in the 8th century.

== Religion ==
According to municipal statistics on 30 June 1997, 579 (60%) of Rammelsbach's inhabitants were Evangelical, 259 (27%) were Roman Catholic, 38 (4%) would not state their religious affiliation, 67 (7%) claimed no religious faith and 2% of the inhabitants belonged to various smaller religious communities. Worshippers belonging to the two traditional big denominations (Evangelical and Catholic) were traditionally members of the parishes centred in Kusel. Only in the time after the Second World War did both the Evangelical and Catholic Christians form their own communities locally. After both the churches were built in 1954, these communities became autonomous, first as an Evangelical vicariate and a Catholic curacy, and then as of 1964, as independent parishes.

== Politics ==
=== Municipal council ===
The council is made up of 16 council members, who were elected by proportional representation at the municipal election held on 7 June 2009, and the honorary mayor as chairman.

The municipal election held on 7 June 2009 yielded the following results:

Year	SPD	CDU	Total
2009	9	7	16 seats
2004	9	7	16 seats

=== Mayor ===
Rammelsbach's mayor is Thomas Danneck.

=== Coat of arms ===
The municipality's arms might be described thus: Per fess argent issuant from the line of partition a bishop's staff sinister azure and a demilion of the same armed, langued and crowned gules, and azure issuant from base a crag sable between a pickaxe per pale and a sledge per pale, the handle embowed to dexter, both of the first.

The arms unite the village's mediaeval history with its more recent history in quarrying. Rammelsbach was the main centre of stone quarrying on the Remigiusberg (mountain). The escutcheon's upper field symbolizes its former feudal allegiances to the Bishopric of Reims, represented by Saint Remigius’s staff on the dexter (armsbearer’s right, viewer’s left) side, and to the Counts of Veldenz and the Dukes of Palatinate-Zweibrücken, represented by the lion on the sinister (armsbearer’s left, viewer’s right) side. Rammelsbach’s very name, once believed to have sprung from the form Remigiusbach, marked it as part of the old Remigiusland, which was subject first to the Bishop of Reims and later to the Abbey of Saint-Remi in Reims, thus explaining the bishop’s staff charge. The Counts of Veldenz and the Dukes of Palatinate-Zweibrücken are represented by not only the lion, but also by the tinctures that prevail throughout the arms, argent and azure (silver and blue). The lower field shows a basalt crag as well as a stonemason’s tools, referring to the village’s stone quarrying tradition. The arms have been borne since 1970 when they were approved by the now defunct Rheinhessen-Pfalz Regierungsbezirk administration in Neustadt an der Weinstraße.

== Culture and sightseeing ==
=== Regular events ===
Nothing much is left of old customs in this former quarrying village. Now bygone are the days when, at Whitsun, young Rammelsbach lads would go from house to house to ask for eggs and bacon while observing the old custom of the Pfingstquack (this is still practised, with variations, in some of the district’s villages; see Henschtal for more). The Carnival (Fastnacht) custom that likewise saw children going door to door reciting their Shrovetide saying, has been forsaken. On the other hand, other customs for children have sprung up: the Star boys’ singing, the Saint Martin's Day Parade and even Halloween. The kermis (church consecration festival, locally known as the Kerb) is held on the second weekend in September. Since 1980, there has also been a village festival on the last weekend in June, and from the beginning, it has been earning greater appeal than the kermis.

=== Clubs ===
Rammelsbach distinguishes itself with a lively club life. The foremost of the village's clubs are listed here. Founded in 1991 was the Turnverein Rammelsbach (Gymnastic Club), which today contains many departments and also plays tennis. The sport club founded in 1922 pays particular attention to football. A shooting club arose after the Second World War. Of particular importance today is the entertainment club “Die Wackepicker”. This club arose from a Carnival club that was founded in 1956. The club even today organizes the local Carnival events, but far beyond Rammelsbach's limits, “Die Wackepicker” are known as a singing group who show up at events both in Rammelsbach and elsewhere. The music club was founded in 1928. It maintains a big wind orchestra. Also worth mentioning is the German Red Cross’s local chapter, which had forerunners as long ago as the First World War and the 1930s, but was newly founded in 1948.

=== Museums ===
Rammelsbach also has its Wilhelm-Panetzky-Museum, housed in the building that formerly housed the quarry administration. It has exhibits relating to the Rammelsbach quarry’s history and methods of recovering the stone. There are also many kinds of quarrying equipment on display.

== Economy and infrastructure ==
=== Economic structure ===
Agriculture. which originally defined Rammelsbach’s commercial life, is nowadays of secondary importance. Limestone quarrying within Rammelsbach’s limits began in the village back in the Middle Ages. For a time there were 20 lime kilns and also brickworks, but after the Second World War, limestone quarrying was no longer worth the effort. Only the stone quarries, which had defined the village for a century and still ensured income, still employ a few people even today, while the municipality lets out the 50 ha melaphyre quarry lands to earn money. Given its great importance in the past, the stone industry needs to be described more thoroughly. At the time when the road was built along the Kuselbach, the hard stone on the Rammelsbacher Kopf, or “Dimpel”, proved itself especially suitable for building roadbeds as far back as 1840. Not least of all for the quarrying and transport of this stone did the Nordpfälzische Eisenbahngesellschaft (“North Palatine Railway Company”) build the Landstuhl–Kusel railway, which opened in 1868. In that same year, the municipality of Rammelsbach concluded an agreement with the railway for using the yield from the quarries. Henceforth, stone would be quarried for railway ballast and crushed stone for roadbuilding, and also for making paving stones. In 1902, more than 900 people were working at the quarry, among them many women, too, who were expected to perform heavy work as surely as the men were. Year, after year, though, as advances came in mechanization, rationalization and automation, the number of quarrymen and quarrywomen shrank. Today, 40 workers can make the same amount of ballast and crushed stone that would have taken 100 workers in bygone years. Making paving stones was also an important activity until the onset of the Second World War. For decades now, however, a company right near the quarry has been making ready-mix concrete. New industries in past decades had to compensate for the potential of the labour force. In 1966, the firm Grundig set up a plant for making audio- and videotape. When this plant was shut down in the wake of rationalization measures at Grundig, the Japanese company TDK founded a new plant in 1986 that likewise made audio- and videotape, but also ceramic components for electronic devices. Employed at this plant in 2003 were more than 300 workers. However, TDK closed the Rammelsbach plant in March 2003, throwing 320 people out of work. Next came “Ritek Media Europe” (RME), a daughter company of Ritek Corporation Taiwan, which at first used the empty factory building to stamp out and package CDs and DVDs, which only employed about 70 people. Since April 2005, this plant has been working with only a small fraction of its original staff complement, and it now only ships CDs and DVDs that have been made elsewhere.

=== Education ===
After the Reformation was introduced, a school was founded in Kusel that could be attended by schoolchildren from all villages within the parish of Kusel, and as of 1544 also by schoolchildren from Rammelsbach. Only a few children would have availed themselves of the opportunity. Only in the late 18th century did Rammelsbach, too, open a winter school (a school geared towards an agricultural community's practical needs, held in the winter, when farm families had a bit more time to spare). Christian Krieger from Aulenbach (a village erased in 1937 when the Nazis set up the Baumholder Troop Drilling Ground) is known to have been the first teacher in Rammelsbach. He was actually a craftsman and a day labourer who could read and write with some competence, and who held his classes in one or other of the village's few houses. With the introduction of compulsory schooling in the early 19th century, Rammelsbach got a diplomaed teacher, but there was still no schoolhouse. It was 1843 before the first such building appeared, on Höhweg (a street). It had two classrooms, one for Evangelical schoolchildren and the other for Catholic. Although the number of schoolchildren grew quickly in the time that followed, municipal council was at first not ready to build a new schoolhouse or expand the old one. Hence, for years, two innkeepers put their dancehalls at the school's disposal to handle the overflow. In 1889, a new schoolhouse was built on Glanstraße, but the number of schoolchildren still kept growing, making it necessary to build yet another in 1904. This third schoolhouse was partly used as the mayor's office. This building has since been renovated and expanded, now serving as the town hall. One of the schoolteachers at that time was named Heinrich Haag, who would later become the Kusel district's first school inspector. There was still a sharp divide between the Catholic school and the Evangelical school. As early as 1933, at a time when Adolf Hitler and the Nazis were solidifying their hold on Germany, there were efforts to establish a Christian community school, against which the village's Catholics fought energetically. Opposition notwithstanding, this community school was instituted in 1938, but it only lasted until October 1945. Classes began again after the Second World War with four Evangelical classes and two Catholic, but with only three teachers, and of the three schoolhouses, only one was now available for use. Many of the children suffered hunger, and often there was not enough heating fuel. The Evangelical school head at that time was the well known Heimatforscher (roughly “local historian”) Albert Zink, while the Catholic school head was Mrs. Erna Giloth. Schooling eventually expanded to ten classes, scattered over the village at, now, all three schoolhouses, making it quite clear that a single, big school building was needed. This was dedicated in 1964. In February 1965, the schoolchildren's parents voted on the reintroduction of the community school model that had been used during the Third Reich. Protestant parents voted overwhelmingly in favour of the proposal, while many Catholic parents were against it. Nonetheless, more than half the Catholic parents favoured it. Therefore, community school was introduced at the beginning of the 1965-1966 school year. Despite this, there were still wholly Catholic classes for children whose parents disagreed with the idea of their children being taught together with Evangelical children. Beginning in the 1969-1970 school year, there were only denominationally mixed classes. The upper level of this system was also attended by pupils from Etschberg. In the course of scholastic reorganization, the Christian community school was dissolved at the beginning of the 1971-1972 school year. A Hauptschule for all students in the newly founded Verbandsgemeinde of Altenglan was opened in Altenglan. The primary schools of 11 villages in the Verbandsgemeinde could now be gathered together under one roof at Rammelsbach's newest school building. This is still the local primary school structure today.

=== Transport ===
During the 18th century, Rammelsbach earned importance to transport technology when the Ulmet-Kusel stretch of the Meisenheim-Zweibrücken road, which had originally run along a rather short but very steep mountaintop alignment, was realigned through the valley, proceeding directly south from Rammelsbach. Heavy loads borne by traffic in those days (wood and wine) were hindered by the ever-damaged Rammelsbach Bridge over the Kuselbach. In 1840, the valley road was expanded by the Kingdom of Bavaria (then the local power) and once more directly linked with Kusel. Later, the road became part of the army road that was expanded in 1938 between Oppenheim and Neunkirchen in the Saarland while the Siegfried Line was being built. This road is now Bundesstraße 420, 10 km along which is the Autobahn A 62 (Kaiserslautern–Trier). The village has had its own railway connection since 1868. Rammelsbach station lies on the Landstuhl–Kusel railway and is served by the hourly Regionalbahn service RB 67, called the Glantalbahn, even though this name refers to a largely closed railway line, part of which is still used by this service, which also runs through to Kaiserslautern. Owing to the shipping of stone from the quarries, Rammelsbach could count itself during the 19th century as ranking sixth among the busiest stations in the whole Palatinate in terms of freight turnover. Stone shipping might also be to thank for this railway's continued existence.

== Famous people ==
=== Sons and daughters of the town ===
- Friedrich Ludwig Philipp von Lüder (b. 1795; d. 1862)

Well known as a Bavarian general, von Lüder played a great part in the 19th century in building up the Bavarian military. He escorted Prince Otto to Athens when he was to assume the Greek crown.

- Alois Bebiolka (b. 1910; d. 1999 in Steinwenden)

Bebiolka worked as a medical doctor in various places, and from 1961 he was a delegate in the Rhineland-Palatinate State Physicians’ Chamber. He was also cofounder of the Hartmannbund (a German medical professional association) and founder of the Kusel chapter of the Rotary Club. Bebiolka held many distinctions, among them the Order of Merit of the Federal Republic of Germany.

- Johannes Menges (b. 1910; d. 1970)

A Cistercian priest and missionary, Menges studied theology, then first joined the Cistercian order before later changing to the Missionaries of the Precious Blood. In their service he was sent to Brazil in 1937, and it was there that he was ordained a priest. As a pastor and a missionary, he worked in the Lower Amazon in the parish of Porto de Moz, which stretched over a broad area. After decades of working in this unhealthy tropical region, Father Menges became ill with leprosy and was sent to the leper colony at Manituba. Although he recovered from this illness, he then came down with tuberculosis and died of a lung tumour.

- Hartwig Bartz (b. 21 February 1936; d. 29 April 2001)

Modern jazz drummer.

- Matthias Arnold (b. 1968)

Germany’s youngest choirmaster at 14, according to the Guinness Book of Records.

- Dieter Niebergall (b. 1950)

Bundesliga referee, 1980–81 season to 1984–85 season, all together 47 Bundesliga assignments.

=== Famous people associated with the municipality ===
- Hans Werner Moser (b. 24 September 1965 in Kusel)

Bundesliga footballer and trainer.
