= Remigiusberg =

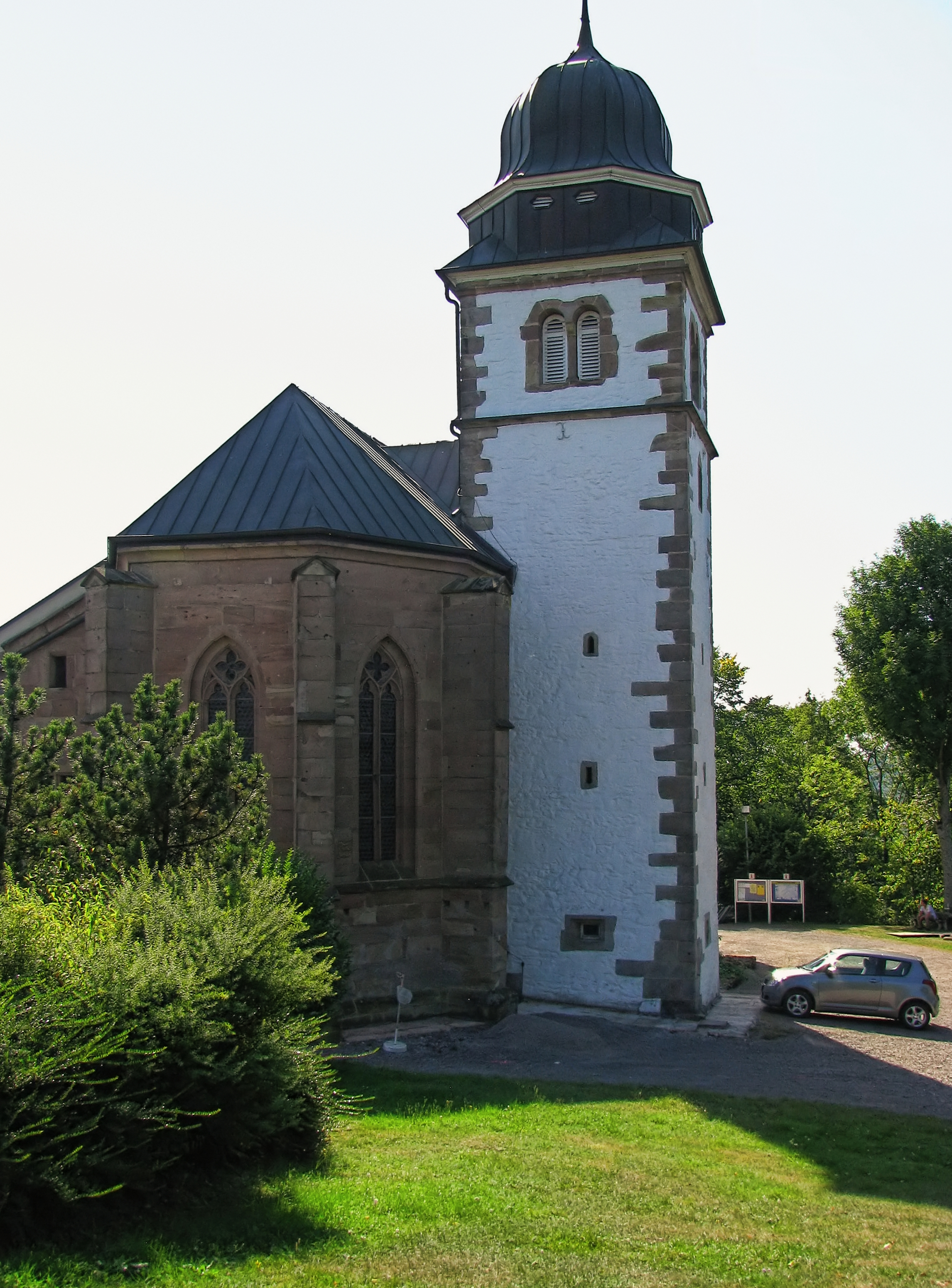
- Propsteikirche St. Remigius auf dem Remigiusberg

Highest point
- Elevation: 368 m above sea level (NN) (1,207 ft)
- Listing: On the summit: priory church and Michelsburg Castle
- Coordinates: 49°31′21″N 07°26′26.4″E

Geography
- Location within Rhineland-Palatinate
- Location: West Palatinate (Germany)
- Parent range: North Palatine Uplands

The Remigiusberg in the county of Kusel in the German state of Rhineland-Palatinate is a hill, 368 metres high, which belongs to the western part of the North Palatine Uplands and only stands above the surrounding terrain by 120 metres.

On its summit dome are the priory church of St. Remigius, the only surviving building of the old eponymous priory, and the ruins of Michelsburg Castle, which are close to one another and only separated by a shallow basin.

== Geography ==
The hill rises in the extreme northwest of the Palatinate region. It is the centre of the area known as the Remigiusland and extends west of the River Glan in the parish of the village of Haschbach; 3 kilometres east on the far side of the Glan is the 562-metre-high Potzberg. Access to the Remigiusberg is from the north via the Kreisstraße 69, which branches off Kreisstraße 21 between Haschbach and Rammelsbach. South of the summit of the Remigiusberg, the Landesstraße 362 runs from west to east connecting Haschbach and Theisbergstegen.

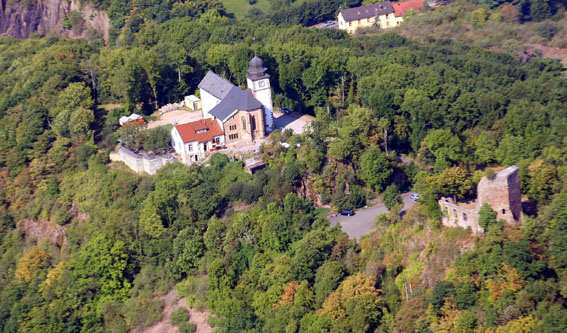
2009 aerial photograph

== History and sights ==
Priory church – a predecessor castle from the 11th century had to give way in 1127 to the construction of an abbey. It was a branch of the Benedictine Abbey of Saint-Remi in Reims and was consecrated to Saint Remigius. Both the priory church and the local area were named after Remigius, even though the saint, who lived in the 5th and 6th centuries, had never visited the area The monastery existed until 1526, when it was dissolved in the wake of the Reformation. The bones of 15 members of the House of Palatinate-Veldenz (County of Veldenz) rest in the priory church.

Michelsburg – In 1260, a second castle was built near the abbey which took its name from the patron saint of the castle chapel, St. Michael and which, today, is a ruin. The castle belonged initially to the County of Veldenz, later to the Wittelsbach Duchy of Palatinate-Zweibrücken. The castle was badly damaged both during the Thirty Years' War and in the War of the Palatine Succession. After it had been finally laid to waste in the 1790s by French Revolutionary troops, in 1794 permission was granted to use it as a quarry. In 1973/74, restoration work was carried out.
