= Theisbergstegen =

- Municipality
- Coat of arms

- Location of Theisbergstegen within Kusel district
- Interactive map of Theisbergstegen
- Location within Germany Location within Rhineland-Palatinate
- Coordinates: 49°31′06″N 7°26′51″E
- Country: Germany
- State: Rhineland-Palatinate
- District: Kusel
- Municipal assoc.: Kusel-Altenglan

Government
  - Mayor (2019–24): Stefan Klein

Area
  - Total: 5.01 km^{2} (1.93 sq mi)
- Elevation: 244 m (801 ft)

Population (2025-12-31)
  - Total: 674
  - Density: 135/km^{2} (348/sq mi)
- Time zone: UTC+01:00 (CET)
  - Summer (DST): UTC+02:00 (CEST)
- Postal codes: 66871
- Dialling codes: 06381
- Vehicle registration: KUS

Theisbergstegen is an Ortsgemeinde – a municipality belonging to a Verbandsgemeinde, a kind of collective municipality – in the Kusel district in Rhineland-Palatinate, Germany. It belongs to the Verbandsgemeinde of Kusel-Altenglan, whose seat is in Kusel.

== Geography ==
=== Location ===
The village of Theisbergstegen, which grew together from the two former villages of Theisberg and Stegen, lies on both sides of the river Glan in the bottom of the dale at an elevation of some 209 m above sea level. On the Glan's right bank (Theisberg), the southwest slope of the Potzberg with its extensive forest within municipal limits – and a castle that is now nothing more than a heap of stones in the woods – rises up steeply to an elevation of 480 m above sea level. Theisberg itself sits on this slope. Left of the Glan looms the 368 m-high Remigiusberg with its castle ruin and church, presenting a picturesque view, which was immortalized as long ago as the early 19th century in a now famous steel engraving. The two historic buildings, however, stand within neighbouring Haschbach's municipal limits. The Glan valley here narrows sharply between the slopes of the Potzberg and the Remigiusberg, which are quite close together. Stretching south from the Remigiusberg is the valley of the Röderbach, which near Theisbergstegen empties into the Glan. Stegen spreads across this likewise narrow side valley and also along the long ridge that stands between the two dales. Running alongside the river Glan are Bundesstraße 423 on the right bank and the railway on the left. The outlying centre of Godelhausen also lies in the Glan valley, with the Potzberg and the Remigiusberg right across the river on the other side, on the outliers of Wackenhübel and Röderwald that edge the Glan valley on the west. The built-up area lies on the comb of a high ridge that drops off smoothly into the dale, while also forming the southern flank of another side valley, through which two more brooks flow on their way to empty into the Glan. Buildings are grouped loosely about a staggered crossroads formed by Bergstraße (“Mountain Road”) coming down the slope and Hauptstraße (“Main Street”) running over the dale's western flank. The municipal area measures 501 ha, of which 128 ha is wooded.

=== Neighbouring municipalities ===
Theisbergstegen borders in the north on the municipality of Altenglan, in the northeast on the municipality of Rutsweiler am Glan, in the east on the municipality of Neunkirchen am Potzberg, in the southeast on the municipality of Matzenbach, in the south on the municipality of Rehweiler, in the southwest on the municipality of Etschberg and in the northwest on the municipality of Haschbach am Remigiusberg. Theisbergstegen also meets the municipality of Rammelsbach at a single point in the north.

=== Constituent communities ===
Theisbergstegen's Ortsteile are Theisberg, Stegen and Godelhausen.

=== Municipality’s layout ===
Today's Ortsteil of Theisbergstegen was originally made up of three villages, Theisberg (Deinsberg) on the Glan's right bank and Oberstegen and Unterstegen over on the left bank, all of which have now grown together. As early as 1715, Theisberg and Stegen were merged into a single municipality. The village as a whole still has the outward appearance of an agricultural structure, which defined life well into the 20th century. In the former Theisberg, people settled mainly along the village thoroughfare (Bundesstraße 423). Next to that, over time, parallel streets arose, one of which runs up to the mountain, reaching the former Theisberg Evangelical school and the Protestant parish church. The latter building stands on a former graveyard and has its beginnings in the Middle Ages. It has, however, undergone many changes, especially with the addition of a steeple during the 20th century. A bridge links Theisberg to Stegen, whose old village core stands along Kuseler Straße in the Rödelbach valley. The newer housing developments, meanwhile, stretch along the Glan, especially on Schulstraße (which rather unsurprisingly, for its name is German for “School Street”, leads to a school, although this is in outlying Godelhausen) and on Bahnhofstraße (“Railway Station Street”). The development along the road to Godelhausen is gradually being built up. On the mountain slope at the side of Kuseler Straße stands the Art Nouveau former Catholic rectory with its built-on chapel. The railway station is found north of the Glan bridge. The sporting ground lies in the north of the former village of Stegen. Far outside the village on the slope of the Potzberg, somewhat hidden, lies the Deinsberg Castle ruin, nowadays known as Alte Burg (“Old Castle”).

== History ==
=== Theisberg and Stegen ===
Deinsberge (Theisberg), which lies east of the river Glan, had its first documentary mention in 992. Stegen, which lies across the river, on the other hand, arose later and was not mentioned until 1364 as Stegin. Theisberg was the seat of the Amt of Deinsberg-Reichenbach and belonged until the early 14th century to the Imperial Domain (Reichsland) around Kaiserslautern. As in Kübelberg and Wolfstein, it could be that a castle was built at Theisbergstegen in Emperor Barbarossa's time to safeguard the western frontier; it also, as “Deinsburg”, gave a family of lesser nobility its name. After a newer castle, the Michelsburg, was built on the Remigiusberg, the older one was called, fittingly enough, Alte Burg (“Old Castle”). Stegen still belonged to the Remigiusland and more locally to the Schultheißerei of Pfeffelbach. In 1600, the Duchy of Palatinate-Zweibrücken ceded the village to its sideline Palatinate-Veldenz, who assigned it to the Schultheißerei of Reichenbach in the Oberamt of Lauterecken.

On 10 July 1715, the village of Theisberg was merged with the village of Stegen. In the early 19th century (1802), there were 144 inhabitants living in Theisbergstegen, whose numbers climbed to 228 persons in 60 households by 1867. Today, 392 people live in Theisbergstegen's main centre (not counting Godelhausen).

The historical built-up area can be found near the church, in the area around the mill at the bridge across the Glan and north of the Rödelbach on the slope of the Remigiusberg. Standing in Theisberg in the mid-19th century were mostly great, individual estate complexes, for instance, the huge Quereinhaus (a combined residential and commercial house divided for these two purposes down the middle, perpendicularly to the street) at Hauptstraße 17 and the Quereinhaus built in 1835 at Friedhofweg 7/9, whereas over in Stegen stretched a whole row of small, even tiny, properties. Between the two villages stood the village mill, which had been rebuilt in the 18th century, and which in 1868 was converted, and run in the early 20th century as a sawmill. The weir that lay before the mill, like the old bridge, has since disappeared. In the latter half of the 19th century, a fire engine hall was built in Theisberg at the foot of Kirchstraße (near no. 2 on that street).

=== Godelhausen ===
The village of Godelhausen, nowadays an Ortsteil of Theisbergstegen, first found mention in a document in 1364 as Godelsauwe. It belonged to the Schultheißerei of Pfeffelbach in the Oberamt of Lichtenberg. Before the Thirty Years' War, in 1609, there were 56 people here in 15 households. By 1675 – the war had ended in 1648 – only three families had settled once again in Godelhausen. In 1677 the village was destroyed once again in the Franco-Dutch War. In the early 19th century (1802), there were 98 inhabitants living in Godelhausen, whose numbers climbed to 217 persons in 44 households by 1867. Today, 329 people live in Theisbergstegen's outlying centre of Godelhausen. Standing in Godelhausen in the mid-19th century were a few great Quereinhäuser (plural of Quereinhaus), standing mostly in a row, gable-to-gable, along Bergstraße. Although a number of estates with forward gables had already been springing up along the road that leads to Theisbergstegen, the village actually first began spreading out from the schoolhouse, built in 1829, towards the south. Only in the early 20th century did the built-up area spread northwards across the brook. The oldest building still standing in the village is the dwelling wing of a former Quereinhaus (Hauptstraße 33), which was built in 1769. The rest of the buildings in Godelhausen today have a 19th-century appearance. At Hauptstraße 67 stands the Godelhausen Mill, which was renovated in 1788 and in 1903 converted to a waterworks for Kusel according to plans by Regional Master Builder (Bezirksbaumeister) Kleinhans.

=== Antiquity ===
The Potzberg area was already settled in prehistoric times, to which archaeological finds bear witness. There have never been any confirmed prehistoric finds within Theisbergstegen's current limits. However, potsherds and bones from prehistoric times have supposedly been found, although their origins, and even their current whereabouts, are now unknown. Also apparently found was a “Gaulish coin”, which has disappeared. There was a Roman settlement whose whereabouts are no longer known, but it has yielded cremation graves, unearthed in the course of building work, and two pieces of stone in the outer wall masonry at Saint Peter's Church (Peterskirche) that are spolia from grave monuments. Two pieces of a Viergötterstein – a Jupiter Column base – that until 1834 were to be found in the church's quire are now kept at the Historisches Museum der Pfalz (Historical Museum of the Palatinate) in Speyer.

=== Middle Ages ===
According to old descriptions, the area on the Glan's left bank lay in the Remigiusland while the area on the Glan's right bank lay in the free Imperial Domain (Reichsland) around Kaiserslautern. Thus the village of Stegen belonged to the Remigiusland while the village of Theisberg belonged to the Imperial Domain. Just when the two villages were founded nobody can say. Certainly, though, Theisberg is older than Stegen. Theisberg's 992 first documentary mention was in a document issued by Emperor Otto III in which Bishop Hildibald of Worms transferred to Count Wolfram the tithes from all the bishopric's holdings in the wooded lands on the Rhine’s left bank against which the bishopric took ownership of commodities in the area of the villages of Altenglan and Deinesberge (Theisberg). This, however, does not seem to make much sense, and it would also seem that the Bishop of Worms took liberties in this deal to which he was not entitled. Whatever the truth is, a village named Deinsberg near a castle of that same name already existed at the time that the document was issued. Indeed, it might have been founded centuries earlier. In the free Imperial Domain around Kaiserslautern, to which Theisberg belonged, though, the record shows no episcopal holdings. What the record does show, however, is that Theisberg was not only an ecclesiastical centre but also the seat of an Amt in an Unteramt of the free Imperial Domain, possibly taking turns in that function with Reichenbach.

It is likely that Stegen had not yet arisen by 992. Since the so-called Remigiusland was always endangered by neighbouring free nobles’ encroachment, it was given over in the early 12th century to Count Gerlach from the Nahegau as a lordly protectorate, a Vogtei. It was at this time that the Monastery on the Remigiusberg came into being, and it can be assumed that until this time, the area had been governed by a branch of the Abbey of Saint-Remi in Reims. Count Gerlach, out of his own holdings and the Vogteien that he held over extensive ecclesiastical holdings, founded the County of Veldenz, to which, right from the beginning, Stegen belonged, whereas Theisberg across the Glan – that is, the border – remained in the free Imperial Domain. In 1345, there was a change in the territorial arrangement when Count Georg I acquired by pledge the Amt of Reichenbach or Deinsberg (its name depended on where the seat happened to be at any given time), within which lay Deinsberg (Theisberg). This swept the Glan border away, and both Theisberg and Stegen found themselves under the same lordship, albeit for now within different Unterämter. In 1364, Count Heinrich II's son, also named Heinrich – indeed he later became Count Heinrich III of Veldenz – lived together with his young wife Lauretta of Sponheim at Lichtenberg Castle. All villages that then belonged to the Veldenz Unteramt of Altenglan had to pay tribute to this young comital couple. Accordingly, Count Heinrich II had a document drawn up that listed every village in what was then the Unteramt of Altenglan, including Stegen. In 1444, Count Friedrich III, the last Count of Veldenz, died. His daughter Anna had been married to Count Palatine Stephan since 1409. He took his inherited holdings from the Electorate of the Palatinate and the County of Veldenz that Anna had just inherited and combined them to found a new County Palatine, known in the fullness of time as the Duchy of Palatinate-Zweibrücken.

=== Modern times ===
In 1543, in the so-called Treaty of Marbach, Duke Wolfgang of Zweibrücken transferred to his uncle Ruprecht lands for the founding of his own County Palatine. These were the village of Veldenz on the Moselle, Lauterecken and the Ämter of Jettenbach and Reichenbach (Deinsberg). The new County Palatine, which later also included Lützelstein (now called La Petite-Pierre) in Alsace, bore the name Palatinate-Veldenz, and later Palatinate-Veldenz-Lützelstein. At first, the only residence town was Lauterecken, but later Lützelstein, too, grew into another residence town. The founding of this new County Palatine once again put a border along the river Glan, even as Count Palatine Ruprecht lived at the Michelsburg (castle) on the Remigiusberg. Theisberg and Stegen were once again split asunder. Through the so-called Recess of Meisenheim in 1600, though, the villages of Haschbach and Stegen, too, passed to Palatinate-Veldenz-Lützelstein, putting Theisberg and Stegen under the same lordship once more, and indeed it would only be just over a century before the two villages were lastingly united into one municipality.

In the meantime, wars ravaged the land: the Thirty Years' War and the wars with France under King Louis XIV. As in all the villages around Kusel, the two villages on the Glan suffered losses among their inhabitants. The County Palatine of Veldenz-Lützelstein died out in the late 17th century, which triggered disputes over ownership of the defunct county's holdings between Palatinate-Zweibrücken and the Electorate of the Palatinate. It was in the midst of these disputes, in 1715, that Theisberg and Stegen were united into one municipality. In the so-called Mannheim Compromise of 1735, Palatinate-Veldenz-Lützelstein was assigned to the Electorate of the Palatinate. In 1788, the geographer Goswin Widder wrote of Theisbergstegen, now in the Electorate of the Palatinate Oberamt of Lauterecken: “Deinsberg and Stegen together make up a municipality and are commonly written Theisberg-Stegen. … In both hamlets one counts no more than 25 families, 130 souls. Nevertheless, 1 church, 1 rectory, 2 schools, 22 townsmanly and mean houses are on hand.”

==== Recent times ====
The French Revolution swept away the old order of feudal lordships. After the founding of the French Department of Sarre with its capital at Trier in 1801, Theisbergstegen lay in the Canton of Kusel in the Arrondissement of Birkenfeld. In the Bavarian time that followed, the village first belonged to the Landkommissariat of Kusel and took turns with Godelhausen as seat of a Bürgermeisterei (“mayoralty”).

The municipality that exists today was newly formed on 7 June 1969 out of the municipalities of Theisbergstegen and Godelhausen as a result of administrative restructuring in Rhineland-Palatinate.

=== Population development ===
Both Theisberg and Stegen were originally farming villages, but in the latter half of the 19th century, the number of working families was already growing quickly with the opening of the quarries on the Remigiusberg. Working families moved to the village, which explains why the population rose so quickly, and also partly why the Catholic share of the population also swelled, from its original 20% to 40% in the mid-20th century. Even before this, Stegen had grown in the 18th century to be the bigger of the two villages. Today, neither agriculture nor stone quarrying employs many workers. Theisbergstegen has grown into a residential community for people of the most varied professions, of whom only a few actually work in the village, and who often must commute far to their jobs. The proportion of pensioners in Theisbergstegen is relatively high.

The following table shows population development over the centuries for Theisbergstegen, with some figures broken down by religious denomination:

Year	1825	1833	1871	1905	1939	1961	2003	2007
Total	208	200	240	323	445	545	774	716
Catholic	43					197
Evangelical	165					348

=== Municipality’s name ===
The name Theisbergstegen is a fusion of two villages’ names, Theisberg and Stegen. The name Theisberg, first mentioned as Deinesberge in a 992 document from Emperor Otto III, might have been an earlier name for the Potzberg, on whose slope a castle and a village arose. The ending —berg still means “mountain” in Modern High German, and as for the syllable prefixed to it, writer Martin Dolch traces this to a personal name, Degin or Dagin. An earlier writer, Ernst Christmann, interpreted the first part of name as Donar, particularly as the village's church was consecrated to Saint Peter (see “Donar's Oak”). Other forms of the name that have been used are: Denesberc (1219), Deynsberg (1221), Denisberg (1253), Deusberch (1309), Deinßberg (1567), Theisberg (1788), Deinsberg (1822).

The name Stegen first appears as Stegin in a well known document from 1364 from Count Heinrich II of Veldenz, according to which the dwellers of the Unteramt of Altenglan-Ulmet had to lend material support to the young Count Heinrich and his wife Lauretta. It dealt with the settlement by a small bridge that led across to the village of Theisberg. The name also crops up later, with only the odd minor variation.

=== Vanished villages ===
Rural cadastral names in the area point to a village named Wetzenhausen, although this lay within Haschbach's current limits. Other vanished villages are unknown.

== Religion ==
Saint Peter's Church (Peterskirche), the church of Theisberg (Deinsberg), functioned as early as the High Middle Ages as the hub of a great parish that reached east of the Glan from Nanzdiezweiler over to Mühlbach, within which there were branch churches in Bosenbach, Neunkirchen am Potzberg and Niedermohr. Also grouped into this parish was the village of Stegen in the Remigiusland, which belonged to the church on the Remigiusberg. Meanwhile, Saint Peter's Church in Theisberg can be regarded as one of the oldest churches in the Glan valley. It was considerably older than the church on the Remigiusberg and without a doubt was preceded by a wooden structure. The first stone building might have arisen at the turn of the 12th century. While other churches were remodelled from the ground up in the time of Gothic architecture, Saint Peter's Church in Theisberg underwent conversions in almost every subsequent style epoch. The original steeple was said to be in disrepair at the end of the Second World War and was thus torn down in 1945 and then replaced with a new one in 1954.

Even after the Reformation, little in the church's organization changed at first. The Reverend Johannes Röber (from Rehborn), at first still a Catholic priest, was mentioned in a 1538 church Visitation protocol as “Lutheran pastor on the Petersberg”. Other Evangelical pastors in these early times were Gottfried Sutoris and Johannes Limbach, the last Abbot of Disibodenberg, who had also already worked as a Lutheran pastor in Odernheim am Glan. While the Lutherans of the Duchy of Palatinate-Zweibrücken had to convert to Calvinism in 1588 on Duke Johannes I's orders, this change did not come off in the County Palatine of Veldenz-Lützelstein. Since the inhabitants of Stegen were only annexed to Veldenz-Lützelstein in 1600, they were obliged to reconvert to Lutheranism, since the conversion to Calvinism had been completed in the intervening twelve years. Stegen now likewise belonged to the parish of Theisberg. After the Thirty Years' War, the principle of cuius regio, eius religio, which had, among other things, brought about the bizarre series of forced conversions in Stegen, was abolished, and once again, Catholic settlers could be found in the villages. Catholics’ numbers were further swollen during the Electorate of the Palatinate rule and by the arrival of Catholic newcomers in the industrial age. In 1724, the Protestants and Catholics came to an agreement to share the churches. The Lutherans from throughout the parish got Saint Peter's Church, whereas the Catholics got the former monastery church on the Remigiusberg. The priest's lonely life up on the mountain was not always easy for him, and at the turn of the 20th century, the wish arose within the Catholic parish to move the seat to Theisbergstegen. This came about in 1909 when the Catholic rectory and its chapel were consecrated. The Evangelical church of Theisbergstegen remained, until the 1818 Palatine Union, tied to Luther's teachings.

Today, roughly 60% of Theisbergstegen's inhabitants are Evangelical and roughly 40% are Catholic. Also belonging to the Theisbergstegen Evangelical parish within the Evangelical deaconry of Kusel are the villages of Haschbach and Etschberg. The Catholics regained their own parish in 1744. Belonging to today's Catholic parish of Remigiusberg, whose seat is in Theisbergstegen, within the Catholic deaconry of Kusel are the Catholics of Etschberg, Haschbach, Matzenbach and Altenglan.

== Politics ==
=== Municipal council ===
The council is made up of 12 council members, who were elected by majority vote at the municipal election held on 7 June 2009, and the honorary mayor as chairman.

=== Mayor ===
Theisbergstegen's mayor is Stefan Klein.

=== Coat of arms ===
The German blazon reads: In Silber durch einen blauen Wellenbalken geteilt, oben rechts eine goldbelegte, rote Mitra, oben links wachsend ein unbekleideter Wassermann in natürlichen Farben mit goldenem Haar, aus einem roten Krug blaues Wasser ausgießend, unten auf grünem Dreiberg eine blaue Kirche mit goldenen Fenstern und goldenem Kreuz.

The municipality's arms might in English heraldic language be described thus: Argent a barrulet wavy azure, in dexter chief a mitre gules garnished Or, in sinister chief issuant from the barrulet a waterbearer unvested proper crined of the fourth pouring water of the second from a jug of the third, issuant from base a mount of three vert upon which a church of the second with windows and cross of the fourth.

The mitre is a reference to the Bishops of Reims, the former owners of the Remigiusland, within which the formerly self-administering municipality of Stegen and the outlying centre of Godelhausen lay. The waterbearer is a charge drawn from Godelhausen's unofficial coat of arms; the meaning is unknown, but the waterbearer appeared on a Godelhausen village seal as early as 1775. The church is a reference to Saint Peter's Church (Peterskirche) in the formerly self-administering municipality of Theisberg.

== Culture and sightseeing ==
=== Buildings ===
The following are listed buildings or sites in Rhineland-Palatinate’s Directory of Cultural Monuments:

==== Theisbergstegen (main centre) ====
- Protestant parish church, Kirchstraße 31 – Remnants of a mediaeval aisleless church, 1833/1834, architect Johann Schmeisser, Kusel, thoroughly converted; unplastered tower, 1954, architect Chief Government Building Officer (Oberregierungsbaurat) Gollwitzer, Kaiserslautern; bell from 1430
- Kirchstraße 23/25 – former school; one-floor building with gable roof, 18th century, small building with hipped roof, 1843, commercial wing 1878
- Moorstraße 17 – ornately designed door with skylight, marked 1785, inscription tablet
- Zum Felsenwald 2 – Catholic rectory; building with hipped roof on rusticated-stone pedestal, one-floor chapel addition, 1908/1909, architect Regional Master Builder (Bezirksbaumeister) Kleinhans; characterizes village’s appearance

==== Godelhausen ====
- Bergstraße 2 – stately three-sided estate, 1870/1871; building with half-hipped roof, two-gated barn
- Bergstraße 4 – Quereinhaus (a combination residential and commercial house divided for these two purposes down the middle, perpendicularly to the street) with half-hipped roof, possibly from the earlier half of the 19th century, expansion in the last third of the 19th century
- Bergstraße 11 – sandstone-framed plastered building on stone-block pedestal, barn marked 1898; original fencing, farmhouse garden
- Hauptstraße 47 – former school; building with half-hipped roof and ridge turret, 1829, expansion in the latter half of the 19th century, pigsty 1902

=== Regular events ===
Theisbergstegen’s kermis (church consecration festival) is a three-day-long festival held on the last weekend in September.

=== Clubs ===
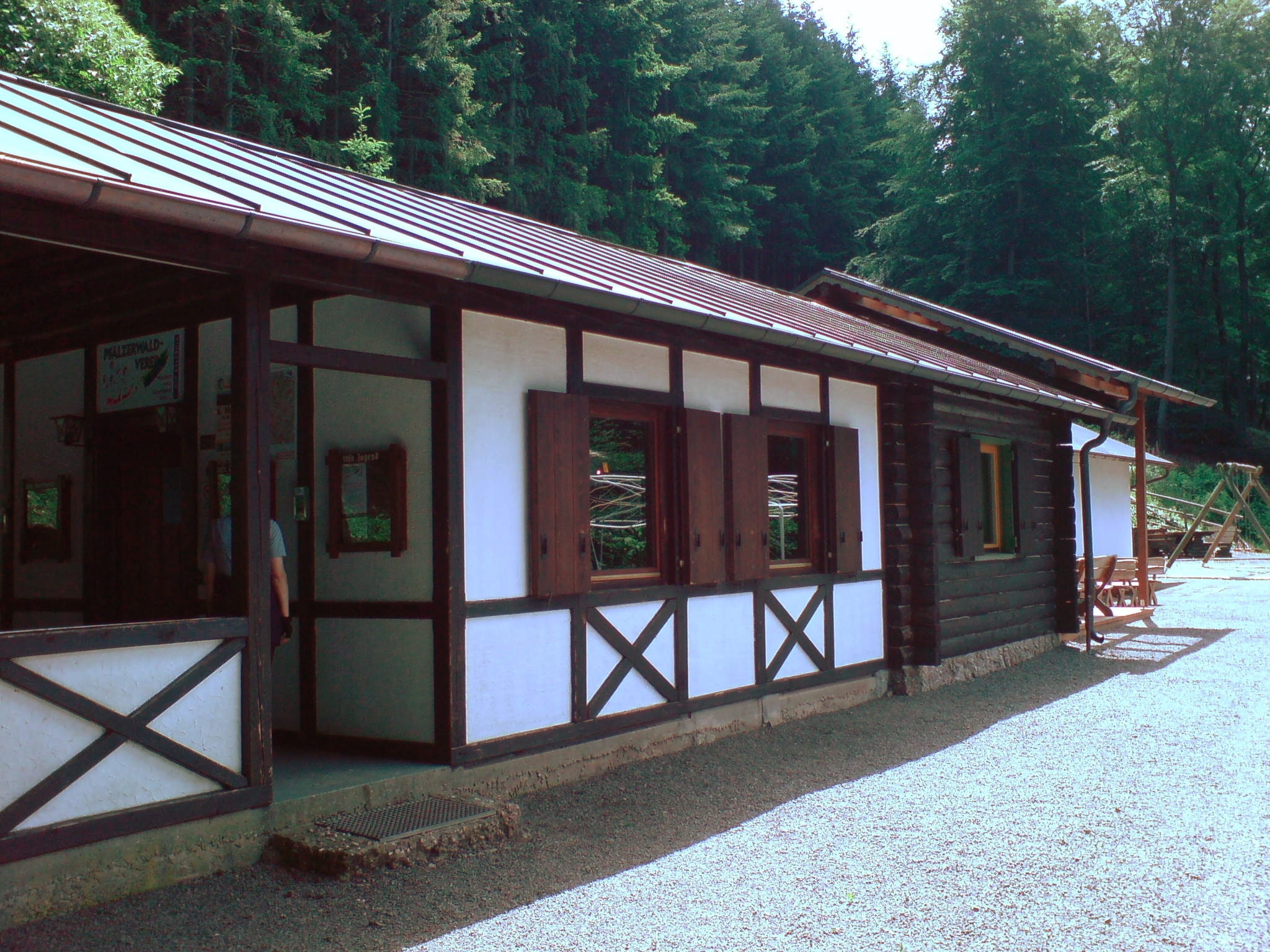
The Buchwaldhütte

The singing club was founded in 1897. The Spielvereinigung (“playing league”) came into being in 1946 and supports several football teams through lively youth work. A gymnastic club, which was founded after the First World War, can be seen as this club's forerunner. Likewise in the 1920s, a shooting club was founded. The Landfrauenverein (“countrywomen’s club”), founded in 1975, too, had a forerunner in the farm housewives’ club, founded in 1898. Also founded in 1975 was the Pfälzerwaldverein (“Palatinate Forest Club”), a hiking club. It maintains a cabin in the Buchwald (forest), the Buchwaldhütte. The newly founded Förderverein Pfalz-Veldenz (“Palatinate-Veldenz Promotional Club”) has its seat in Theisbergstegen.

== Economy and infrastructure ==
=== Transport ===
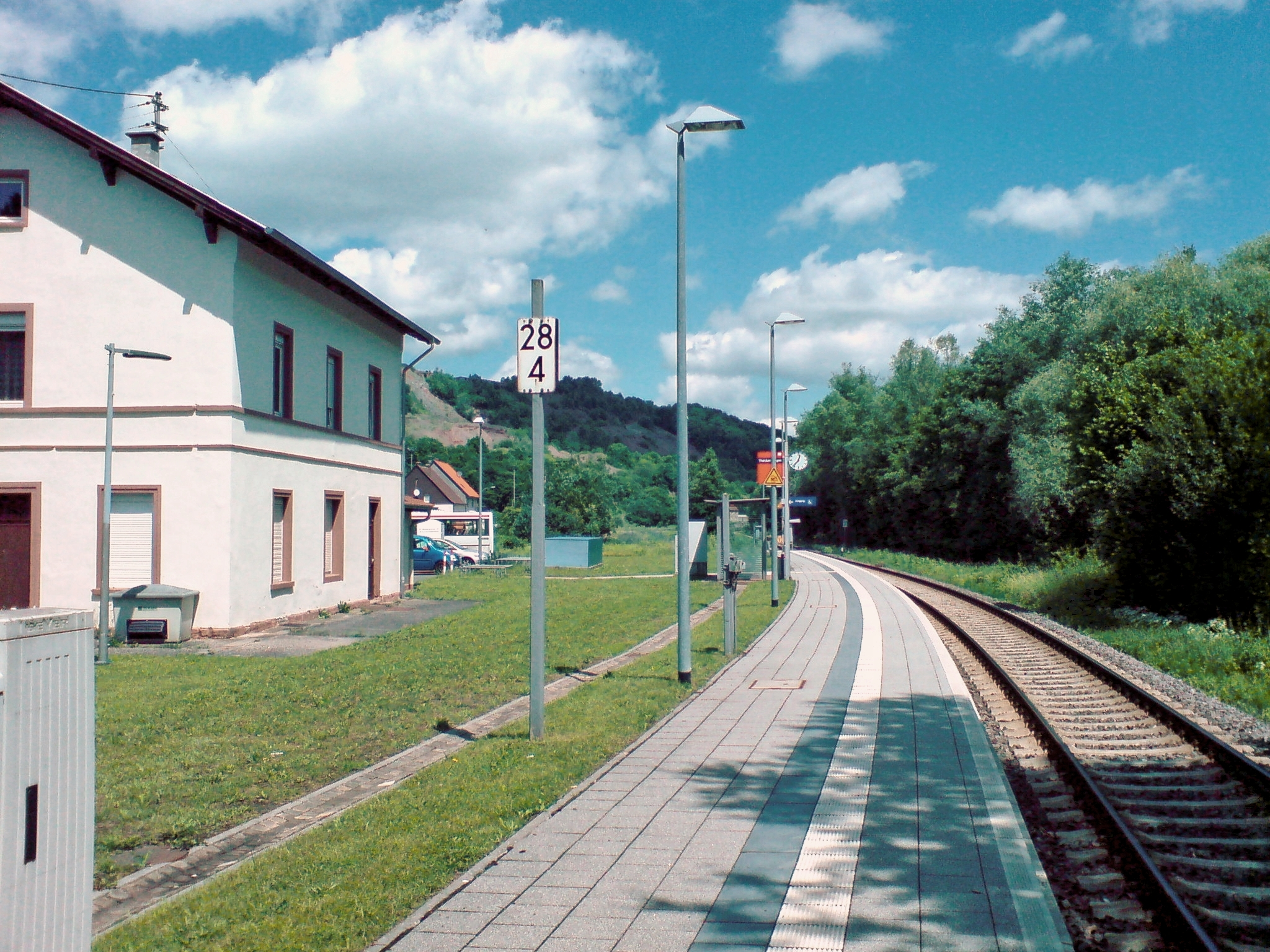
Theisbergstegen station

Running through Theisbergstegen, linking it to the national road network, is Bundesstraße 423 (Sarreguemines–Mandelbachtal–Altenglan). Within the village itself, Landesstraße 362 branches off linking the village by way of Haschbach with Kusel. Autobahn interchanges near Kusel and Glan-Münchweiler lie some 10 km away. The village lies on the one-track Landstuhl–Kusel railway and there are hourly trains at the station throughout the day, namely Regionalbahn service RB 67 between Kaiserslautern and Kusel, named Glantalbahn after a former railway line that shared a stretch of its tracks with the Landstuhl–Kusel railway, including Theisbergstegen station. The railway also serves to ship away the crushed porphyry quarried on the Remigiusberg.

=== Economic development ===
Theisberg and Stegen were originally held to be farming villages, even if the slopes of the Potzberg and also the steep sides of the Remigiusberg in the Glan valley here were not considered particularly fertile. Better yields were to be had from fields on the floodplain, on the less steep slopes elsewhere in the Glan valley and in the Röderbach valley. A more important economic factor was the one first mentioned in 1543: the mill. Over time, this was run as a gristmill, an oilmill or a sawmill, sometimes at the same time. Shortly before the turn of the 20th century, the mill burnt down; it was built again in 1900 in sober style. Already by the 18th century, the Potzberg mines were offering the populace jobs, as too were the quarries on the Remigiusberg's eastern slope by the 19th century. In 1862, the government in Speyer gave its approval for the opening of a quarry, which began work forthwith, although in the beginning it was not run very efficiently. In 1877, a few quarrymen opened another quarry under their own management, which did better for a time, until the Second World War broke out. Even so, it opened again after the war. Small and midsize businesses have located in the municipality, such as excavating and rubble transport, an automotive workshop, a hairstylist, a filling station, a tanning salon and racing businesses.

=== Public institutions ===
The municipality has a multipurpose hall.

=== Education ===
The efforts in the Duchy of Palatinate-Zweibrücken dating from the time of the Reformation to further schooling throughout the duchy, supported an independent interpretation of the Bible, disrupted by the war-filled times of the 17th century. A few schools existed, taught the year round, but were only found in larger towns. Smaller centres like Theisbergstegen, for the most part, had to make do throughout the 18th century with winter school (a school geared towards an agricultural community's practical needs, held in the winter, when farm families had a bit more time to spare), in which the winter school teacher would hold classes during the colder months, only to seek another livelihood in the warmer ones. Such an arrangement was to be found in Theisbergstegen.

By the early 19th century, though, there was a Lutheran-Evangelical school in the village on Kirchstraße, below the Evangelical rectory, and then there was the Catholic schoolhouse on the Glan's right bank near the bridge. Some things are also known about relations between teachers and the villagers. There was, for instance, a dispute between a teacher and a father in the early 20th century. The father claimed that the teacher had caned his son too hard and he furthermore offered up various insults to the teacher. The teacher then successfully sued his pupil's father for defamation, prompting the father, for his part, to lodge a complaint against the teacher for having caused bodily harm, but he was let off with only a warning. In 1955, the municipality built a “central school” in Godelhausen, where at first all primary school and Hauptschule students from Theisbergstegen were taught. Since the 1970 general school reform, this building serves strictly as a primary school for several villages in the Verbandsgemeinde of Kusel. Hauptschule students now attend classes on the Roßberg in Kusel. Other kinds of schools, such as Gymnasium, Realschule, Berufsbildende Schulen (vocational training schools) and Förderschulen (special schools), are also represented in Kusel.

The municipality has one kindergarten and one primary school.

== Famous people ==
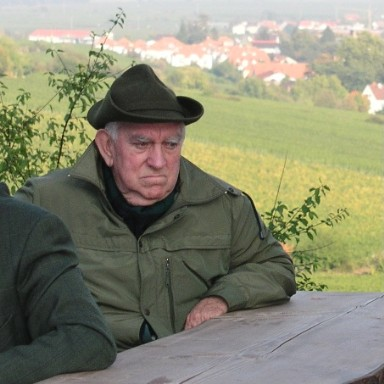
Paul Tremmel

=== Sons and daughters of the town ===
- Paul Tremmel (1929–), Palatine dialect poet
