= Rutsweiler am Glan =

- Municipality
- Coat of arms

- Location of Rutsweiler am Glan within Kusel district
- Interactive map of Rutsweiler am Glan
- Location within Germany Location within Rhineland-Palatinate
- Coordinates: 49°31′39.677″N 7°27′18.256″E
- Country: Germany
- State: Rhineland-Palatinate
- District: Kusel
- Municipal assoc.: Kusel-Altenglan

Government
  - Mayor (2019–24): Joachim Sander

Area
  - Total: 1.59 km^{2} (0.61 sq mi)
- Elevation: 210 m (690 ft)

Population (2025-12-31)
  - Total: 284
  - Density: 179/km^{2} (463/sq mi)
- Time zone: UTC+01:00 (CET)
  - Summer (DST): UTC+02:00 (CEST)
- Postal codes: 66887
- Dialling codes: 06381
- Vehicle registration: KUS
- Website: rutsweiler-glan.de

Rutsweiler am Glan is an Ortsgemeinde – a municipality belonging to a Verbandsgemeinde, a kind of collective municipality – in the Kusel district in Rhineland-Palatinate, Germany. It belongs to the Verbandsgemeinde of Kusel-Altenglan, whose seat is in Kusel. Rutsweiler am Glan is one of two places in the Kusel district named Rutsweiler. The other is Rutsweiler an der Lauter, lying some 13 km to the east-northeast.

== Geography ==
=== Location ===
Rutsweiler am Glan lies in the Kusel Musikantenland (“Minstrels’ Land”) in the Western Palatinate at the foot of the Potzberg on the river Glan's right bank in a north-south direction along Bundesstraße 423 (Altenglan–Glan-Münchweiler–Sarreguemines). The valley floor lies at an elevation of 207.0 to 203.3 m above sea level. The ground rises steeply up towards the Potzberg's summit to the east. The hilliness and the soil's poor quality hinder any intensive use. Living in the municipality are 371 inhabitants in an area of 159 ha, of which 144 ha is woodland, cropland and meadowland.

=== Neighbouring municipalities ===
Rutsweiler am Glan borders in the north on the municipality of Altenglan, in the east on the municipality of Föckelberg, in the southeast on the municipality of Neunkirchen am Potzberg and in the south and west on the municipality of Theisbergstegen.

=== Municipality’s layout ===
As can be seen on the 1850 village map, the built-up part of Rutsweiler am Glan was once concentrated loosely around the village well in the middle of the village. Until the late 1950s, the village's expansion thrust mainly to the north and south along Hauptstraße (“Main Street”). Only when new building zones were opened did the village begin spreading towards the Potzberg. All together, 65 new buildings arose after the Second World War. Out of what was originally a workers’ village with farming as a secondary occupation has today grown into almost exclusively a residential community for commuters.

== History ==
=== Antiquity ===
Rutsweiler am Glan is among the Middle Glan Valley's oldest villages. Before and during Roman times, the area was settled by Celts. After the Romans withdrew, Frankish settlers came thrusting into the land.

=== Middle Ages ===
Rutsweiler's founding may have happened in the 7th or 8th century when territorial changes took place with the donation of the Remigiusland. The prevailing version of the story about the donation of the Remigiusland by Frankish king Clovis I to the Bishop of Reims on the occasion of Clovis's baptism and conversion along with 3,000 other Franks in 496, has been called into question by historians, and is interpreted in various different versions. Undisputed, however, is that the donation, in whatever year it took place, went into effect very early on and the formerly kingly Imperial Domain passed into ecclesiastical ownership. The river Glan thereby became a border, with all the villages on the right bank, from Rehweiler to Altenglan still held by King Charlemagne (768-814). After the division of the Carolingian Empire in the 9th century, the Rutsweiler area became a German domain, whereas the Remigiusland remained under ownership of the Bishopric of Verdun. Endless disputes over succession as well as over borders led to continual friction between the secular rulers and the Church of Reims. Even the Counts of Veldenz, who from 1072 to 1444 ruled as two separate lordly families, who held considerable power in the Rutsweiler area and who bore responsibility for security in the Remigiusland as Schutzvögte, were no exception to this general rule. Their quest for broadened power eventually brought them the Schultheißerei of Reichenbach, to which Rutsweiler then belonged, in the form of an Imperial pledge. Together with the parish of Deinsberg, Rutsweiler am Glan originally belonged to the Imperial Domain (Reichsland) around Lautern (Kaiserslautern). Going by Rutsweiler am Glan's first documentary mention in 1303, it can be inferred that the village then found itself as a so-called Imperial pledged holding in the hands of the Landvogt of the Speyergau, Count Georg I of Veldenz. In 1444, the County of Veldenz met its end when Count Friedrich III of Veldenz died without a male heir. His daughter Anna wed King Ruprecht's son Count Palatine Stephan. By uniting his own Palatine holdings with the now otherwise heirless County of Veldenz – his wife had inherited the county, but not her father's title – and by redeeming the hitherto pledged County of Zweibrücken, Stephan founded a new County Palatine, as whose comital residence he chose the town of Zweibrücken: the County Palatine – later Duchy – of Palatinate-Zweibrücken.

=== Modern times ===
New territorial changes came by 1524, as manifested in the 1543 Treaty of Marburg, which established the Principality of Palatinate-Veldenz-Lützelstein. Among other things, this resulted in the Amt of Bosenbach, to which Rutsweiler, Mühlbach, Föckelberg, Gimsbach, Deinsberg and a number of other nearby places belonged, being incorporated into this new state, thereby making the Glan a border from Altenglan to Bettenhausen between Palatinate-Veldenz and Palatinate-Zweibrücken jurisdiction. There were border disputes, although these were resolved peacefully by a series of treaties in 1600 and 1607. Rutsweiler, together with the other places around the Potzberg, was transferred to Count Palatine Georg Gustav. With Count Palatine Leopold Ludwig's death in 1694, the family Palatinate-Veldenz died out in the male line after four generations. There was, of course, a dispute over who would inherit his “orphaned” estate, but it ended with the Settlement of Mannheim on 24 December 1733. The Schultheißerei of Reichenbach, which included Rutsweiler, would henceforth belong to the Palatinate.

==== Recent times ====
The rather haphazardly chosen borders, though, held true for none too long. No sooner had the French Revolution reached full swing than it spilt over into the Palatinate in 1792. In the fighting that followed, the French defeated the Austrian-Prussian alliance, and all sovereign boundaries on the Rhine’s left bank were swept away. The administration of the conquered areas was reorganized according to the French Revolutionary model. During the French occupation between 1801 and 1814, the village belonged to the Mairie (“Mayoralty”) of Neunkirchen am Potzberg, the Canton of Landstuhl, the Arrondissement of Deux Ponts (Zweibrücken) and the Department of Mont-Tonnerre (or Donnersberg in German). Under the Treaty of Paris (30 May 1814), the Palatinate passed to the Kingdom of Bavaria. The Landcommissariat of Kusel (as of 1862 the Bezirksamt of Kusel) consisted of the cantons of Kusel, Lauterecken and Wolfstein. Rutsweiler was grouped into this last canton and was administered by the Mayoralty of Neunkirchen until 1825, and then by the Mayoralty of Mühlbach from 1826 to 1853. After a petition in 1829, the municipality, together with Mühlbach and Bedesbach, was transferred out of the canton of Wolfstein on 1 January 1836 and into the canton of Kusel by reason of the better accessibility under this arrangement. Beginning in 1853 and until 1972, Rutsweiler belonged to the Mayoralty of either Godelhausen or Theisbergstegen. In 1845, the village got a schoolhouse. In 1899, it was given an upper floor and a belltower. Between 1893 and 1903, four trial bores were made on the Potzberg, two within Rutsweiler's limits, by prospectors seeking coal. On 15 May 1908, the waterworks (a cistern and a watermain) were brought into service. Electric light came to the village in 1921. On Christmas Eve 1944, the village was bombed by the Allies; two civilian villagers were killed. On 19 March 1945, United States troops took Rutsweiler am Glan. After the Second World War, the memorial at the graveyard was dedicated in 1953. A new schoolhouse was dedicated on 24 November 1962. In the course of administrative restructuring in Rhineland-Palatinate, Rutsweiler was grouped into the then newly founded Verbandsgemeinde of Altenglan in 1972. Rutsweiler was granted arms in 1978. In 1986, Rutsweiler am Glan participated in the contest Unser Dorf soll schöner werden (“Our village should become lovelier”), winning second place at the district level.

=== Population development ===
On 30 June 1997, the population's age breakdown in Rutsweiler am Glan was as follows:

- 19 or younger: 19%
- 20–59: 59%
- 60 or older: 32%

The oldest known listing of the population comes from a 1594 taxation roll for the Mey Bedt, or “May tax”, which lists 13 people who were liable to taxation, suggesting a total population of 50 to 55 inhabitants. Rutsweiler's losses in the First World War amounted to four fallen, and in the Second World War, 22 fallen in battle, killed in the village's one air raid or missing in action. Despite the many new houses, the population level has been stagnant for at least 30 years, and more recently seems to have been shrinking. Underlying this may be the declining birthrate, or perhaps a drop in numbers of people moving to the village. The local dialectal speech, which included French expressions, has largely died out now, and older villagers only ever still use it now and then, or can at least interpret it.

The following table shows population development over the centuries for Rutsweiler am Glan, with some figures broken down by religious denomination:

Year	1790	1825	1835	1871	1905	1939	1961	1986	1997	2005
Total	72	142	139	156	203	297	368	393	372	378
Catholic		13					21
Evangelical		129					344

=== Municipality’s names ===
Rutsweiler is one of the oldest villages in the Middle Glan Valley. Ernst Christmann presumed that the name quite possibly went back to the personal name Hruod (later Ruod). This man, Ruod – whoever he was – was surely one of the first (perhaps the first) to live at what is now the village of Rutsweiler am Glan. The village's name has undergone spelling changes quite a number of times, having formerly been known as Rützweiller in 1590 and Rudtsweiler am Glan about 1835. Other forms known to history are Routzweiler, Rutzweyler and Rußwilre. In June 1303, Rutsweiler had its first documentary mention. The actual document says: “Count Georg of Veldenz (Veldentie) gives his consent for Sir Heinrich, son of the knight Godebert of Zweibrücken (de Geminoponte), to bestow upon his wife Lyse his Veldenz fief in Rußwilre and lying around the mountain Deynesperg. – Datum anno domini 1303 post octavas Trinitas.” In other words, it was a widow's estate for his wife. Unfortunately, this document has gone missing, and despite intensive searching, it has not turned up in any state archive. There also seems to be some confusion as to the spelling used therein, with another source rendering it Ruzwilre.

The Potzberg may well derive its name from the word Putsch, but not in the meaning in which the Modern High German word Putsch is generally understood today. Rather, it is a form of the word Busch, cognate with the English word “bush”, and thus the name would mean a mountain with bushy growth on it.

The river Glan flows through the village from south to north. Its name is likely of Celtic origin. One story, though, has it that it draws its name from the fish Silurus glanis (the wels catfish or sheatfish).

== Religion ==
Rutsweiler am Glan has never had its own church. The villagers were formerly almost exclusively Protestant, and thus their religious past was always the same as for the church at Deinsberg (Theisbergstegen) on the Potzberg, whereas the Catholics always belonged to the parish of St. Remigius am Remigiusberg. The first breakdown by religion comes from the year 1802, according to which the population was made up of 9 Catholics, 99 Lutherans and 9 Calvinists. In 1837, it was 11 Catholics and 138 Protestants. According to the latest statistics from 1986 and 1997, the share of Evangelical Christians had shrunk from 82% to 76%, while the Catholic share of the population remained steady at 12%. Some 10% of the villagers now belong to another religious community besides these two, or they acknowledge membership in none.

== Politics ==
=== Municipal council ===
The council is made up of 8 council members, who were elected by majority vote at the municipal election held on 7 June 2009, and the honorary mayor as chairman.

=== Mayor ===
Rutsweiler's mayor is Joachim Sander.

=== Coat of arms ===
The German blazon reads: Auf grünem Dreiberg in Silber rechts ein blaues Merkurium-Zeichen, darüber ein ebenfalls blauer Reichsapfel, links ein rotbewehrter und rotbezungter blauer Löwe.

The municipality's arms might in English heraldic language be described thus: Argent issuant from base a mount of three vert, dexter a globus cruciger and a mercury symbol in pale, both azure, and sinister a lion rampant of the same armed and langued gules.

The arms group together charges representing the village's history. Rutsweiler's past as part of the Reichsland (Imperial Domain) and various Palatine lordships is symbolized by both the globus cruciger (called a Reichsapfel in the German blazon, “Imperial apple”) and the lion, both of which are shown in the tinctures borne by the County of Veldenz. The local mountain, the Potzberg, is represented by the mount of three, a charge known in German heraldry as a Dreiberg. The mercury symbol recalls the former quicksilver mining within municipal limits. The arms have been borne since 27 September 1978 when they were approved by the now defunct Rheinhessen-Pfalz Regierungsbezirk administration in Neustadt an der Weinstraße.

== Culture and sightseeing ==
=== Buildings ===
The following are listed buildings or sites in Rhineland-Palatinate’s Directory of Cultural Monuments:

- Hauptstraße 74 – former fire engine house; one-floor plastered building with jutting gable roof and ridge turret, possibly from the latter half of the 19th century

=== Regular events ===
Among folk festivals in Rutsweiler am Glan, the kermis (church consecration festival, held on the third Sunday in September) has survived, but is no longer considered important. Beginning in 1985 and for several years thereafter, a village festival was held on the second weekend in August. Dwindling attendance and people’s unwillingness to volunteer their help for the event brought about council’s decision to suspend the event for the time being. The municipality invites those aged 65 or older to a seniors’ celebration each year in December.

=== Clubs ===
Rutsweiler am Glan's club life can still be said to be lively, even though all clubs in the village suffer from the dearth of new, younger membership. The oldest club and cultural sponsor is the singing club, which was founded in 1904, and had to suspend its singing activities during both world wars. After the Second World War, the club started back up as a mixed choir. The conversation club, founded in 1950 stages theatre productions with periodic interruptions. The countrywomen's club, founded in 1973, distinguishes itself by offering activities such as cooking, sewing and handicraft courses.

== Economy and infrastructure ==
=== Economic structure ===
The greater part of Rutsweiler am Glan's population worked even into the 1950s at the stone quarries around the Remigiusberg. Agriculture was worked as a secondary occupation, for the scant soil never would yield up plentiful crops. Since that time, there has been a great shift in the economic base, and most villagers nowadays work in the service sector, administration and industry in Kusel and in the Kaiserslautern area. Most of the fields now lie fallow. Among independent businesses in Rutsweiler today are a bakery, a trout farming business, a building firm and an electrical installation firm. From 1893 to 1901, two deep-boring operations were undertaken on the Potzberg, whose purpose was to explore for the presence of coal. Even after two more exploratory bores in other municipalities, the results were unsatisfactory.

=== Education ===
In 1844, Rutsweiler am Glan got its first schoolhouse. Until then, schoolchildren had been attending denominational schools in Theisbergstegen. The building, which stood apart from others for its great size, also housed the teacher's dwelling. Even so, the thoroughly inadequate facilities forced the municipality to add an upper floor in 1897. During the Second World War, schooling was reduced bit by bit, and schoolchildren had to go to either Theisbergstegen or Godelhausen again. Rising numbers of children drove the municipality to build a new schoolhouse in 1960, this one with a separate teacher's dwelling. It was dedicated in November 1962. The forecast of having made a great investment for the future did not last very long, only ten years. With the end of the 1970/1971 school year, schooling was ended at the village school. Ever since, primary school pupils have been attending classes in Theisbergstegen while Hauptschule students have been going to Altenglan. Other types of secondary school, such as Realschule and Gymnasium, are available in Kusel. In 1988, the schoolhouse, which had stood empty for almost two decades, was converted into a village community centre.

=== Transport ===
Running through Rutsweiler is Bundesstraße 423 (Altenglan–Glan-Münchweiler–Sarreguemines). Besides this road, which runs along the village's length, Rutsweiler am Glan has five local streets, all of which but Wingertstraße are linked with each other as well as with Bundesstraße 423, also known locally as Hauptstraße (“Main Street”). It was also formerly known as Moorstraße, whose first syllable refers to Moor in the word's more usual German meaning of “low-lying wetland”. This old name likely owes itself to the street's lying right near the Glan, a river known for often flooding its banks, which were not secured in any way, and were boggy at the best of times. Furthermore, the peat that was cut in the Landstuhl Marsh was sometimes shipped along this road. The local streets are all named for the cadastral areas through which they pass. To the southwest runs the Autobahn A 62 (Kaiserslautern–Trier). Serving Altenglan and Theisbergstegen are railway stations on the Landstuhl–Kusel railway.
