= Recess (Holy Roman Empire) =

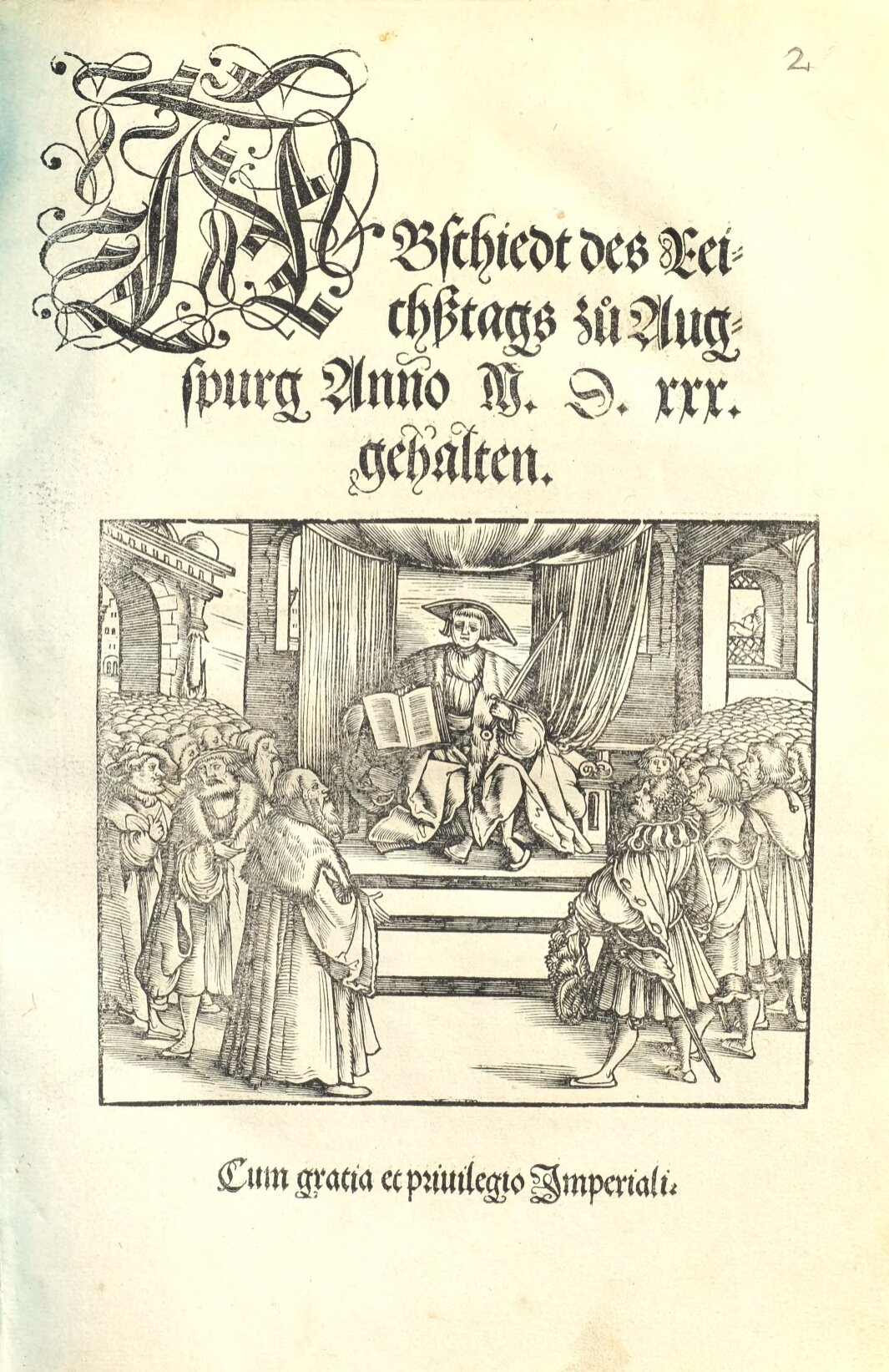
Cover of the Reichsabschied for 1530; Charles V, Holy Roman Emperor is enthroned with sword and book between the two religious factions (Catholic and Protestant).

A Recess (German: Reichsabschied, Reichsrezess) in the Holy Roman Empire was the document detailing all the decisions made by an Imperial Diet.

Until 1654, a Diet began, in addition to ceremonial rituals, with the reading of the Imperial Proposition—the agenda predetermined by the Emperor—and ended with the decisions being read by the Emperor and ratified, the Recess.

The last such Recess is called the Youngest Recess (Latin: recessus imperii novissimus) and contains the resolutions of the 1653/54 Diet of Regensburg.

Since the Perpetual Diet of Regensburg which began in 1663 was never formally concluded, its decisions could not be collected as a Recess. They were therefore issued in the form of so-called Imperial Conclusions (Reichsschlüsse). Ratification of these conclusions was usually carried out by the Emperor's representative in the Reichstag, the Principal Commissioner, in the form of an Imperial Commissioner's decree.
