= Horschbach =

- Municipality
- Coat of arms

- Location of Horschbach within Kusel district
- Interactive map of Horschbach
- Location within Germany Location within Rhineland-Palatinate
- Coordinates: 49°35′20″N 7°31′47″E
- Country: Germany
- State: Rhineland-Palatinate
- District: Kusel
- Municipal assoc.: Kusel-Altenglan

Government
  - Mayor (2019–24): Michael Herrmann

Area
  - Total: 7.05 km^{2} (2.72 sq mi)
- Elevation: 220 m (720 ft)

Population (2025-12-31)
  - Total: 237
  - Density: 33.6/km^{2} (87.1/sq mi)
- Time zone: UTC+01:00 (CET)
  - Summer (DST): UTC+02:00 (CEST)
- Postal codes: 66887
- Dialling codes: 06387
- Vehicle registration: KUS
- Website: horschbach.com

Horschbach is an Ortsgemeinde – a municipality belonging to a Verbandsgemeinde, a kind of collective municipality – in the Kusel district in Rhineland-Palatinate, Germany. It belongs to the Verbandsgemeinde of Kusel-Altenglan, whose seat is in Kusel.

== Geography ==
=== Location ===
The municipality lies at the foot of the Herrmannsberg hill in the Western Palatinate. Through Horschbach flows the village's namesake brook, the Horschbach. The village lies at an elevation of some 220 m above sea level on the north side of the Herrmannsberg (563 m above sea level) in the Horschbach valley, with most of its houses on the brook's right bank. The summit of the Herrmannsberg lies within the municipality's limits. Along the brook's left bank stretches the woodland known as the Großes Mayen, which reaches an elevation of 352 m above sea level. The Reibelsberg between Horschbach and Gumbsweiler reaches 309 m above sea level. The Spenzelberg down the valley is 305 m high. The municipal area measures 705 ha, of which 93 ha is wooded.

=== Neighbouring municipalities ===
Horschbach borders in the north on the municipality of Glanbrücken, in the northeast on the municipality of Hinzweiler, in the southeast on the municipality of Oberweiler im Tal, in the south on the municipality of Eßweiler, in the southwest on the municipality of Elzweiler, in the west on the municipality of Welchweiler and in the northwest on the municipality of Sankt Julian.

=== Municipality’s layout ===
Branching away from each other in Horschbach's village centre are the roads to Glanbrücken, Welchweiler and Hinzweiler, each one of which is only loosely built up. South of this mesh of roads is a housing development whose streets climb up the Herrmannsberg massif. In the village's east end stands the church, while north of the village, at the side of the road leading to Glanbrücken, lies the graveyard. Within the village itself are found the village community centre with the shooting club's clubhouse and a fire station for the villages of Horschbach, Elzweiler and Welchweiler.

== History ==
=== Antiquity ===
In 1910, some Roman coins, some potsherds and the foundations of a Roman settlement were unearthed on the Herrmannsberg. No prehistoric archaeological finds have ever come to light in Horschbach.

=== Middle Ages ===
The village likely arose in the 8th century in the broad Imperially immediate domain around the town of Kaiserslautern. Only in the 14th century did its name appear in a document (another source states that Horschbach's first documentary mention came in 1190). During the 13th century, great parts of the Imperially immediate domain were pledged to the counties at the edge of the Königsland (“King’s Land”). Horschbach then lay in the so-called Pflegschaft Hundheim (Pflegschaft means something like “trusteeship”), which was pledged to the Rhinegraves of Grumbach. The whole Pflegschaft, to which belonged all the villages of the Eßweiler Tal (dale), shared the Rhinegraviate's history for some 250 years. A mediaeval castle complex below the Herrmannsberg's peak was utterly destroyed long ago and lies at a rather unreachable spot in the mountain's woods. About the castle's history, nothing is known, and even its name has been forgotten over the ages.

=== Modern times ===
In 1595, the whole Pflegschaft of Hundheim, along with other villages in the area, was transferred to the Duchy of Palatinate-Zweibrücken. Horschbach, and also Niedereisenbach and Hachenbach (both nowadays outlying centres of Glanbrücken), along with Elzweiler remained with the Duchy until it was dissolved in the time of the French Revolution. The other villages in the Pflegschaft of Hundheim passed back to the Rhinegraviate in 1755. Even then, Horschbach was the seat of an Unteramt. One Schultheiß at that time for the whole Amt was Peter Simon Gilcher (1762).

==== Recent times ====
During the French Revolution and Napoleonic times, Horschbach lay within the Department of Mont-Tonnerre (or Donnersberg in German), whose seat was at Mainz, the Canton of Wolfstein and the Arrondissement of Kaiserslautern. After French rule ended and Napoleon met his ultimate political fate at Waterloo, the Congress of Vienna awarded a great swathe of territory in this region to the Kingdom of Bavaria, and by 1817, Horschbach found itself within this exclave, called the Bayerischer Rheinkreis (“Bavarian Rhine District”). More locally, it lay within the Landcommissariat (later Bezirksamt, later still Landkreis or district) of Kusel and the Canton of Wolfstein. Horschbach was also an administrative seat, home to the Bürgermeisterei (“mayoralty”) for the three Herrmannsberg municipalities of Horschbach, Elzweiler and Welchweiler, and from the beginning until 1838 also for Bedesbach, a village on the river Glan. Such was the uniting force of this arrangement that until 1853, the villages of Horschbach and Elzweiler were regarded as one village. In 1923, the warriors’ memorial for those who fell in the First World War was built. The following year, electric lighting was installed in Horschbach. At elections between 1920 and 1933 – in Weimar times – the strongest showings were among centre-right and rightwing parties, a common pattern in places with a strongly developed agricultural structure. Indeed, in the late 1920s and early 1930s, the Nazi Party (NSDAP) became quite popular in Horschbach. In the 1928 Reichstag elections, none of the local votes went to Adolf Hitler’s party, but by the 1930 Reichstag elections, this had grown to 23.9%. By the time of the 1933 Reichstag elections, after Hitler had already seized power, local support for the Nazis had swollen to 92.5%. Hitler’s success in these elections paved the way for his Enabling Act of 1933 (Ermächtigungsgesetz), thus starting the Third Reich in earnest. It was not until 1949 that the first tractor, owned by a man named Ernst Mäurer, made its appearance in Horschbach. Bavarian times ended with the Allied occupation after the Second World War and the region became part of the then newly founded state of Rhineland-Palatinate. The Bürgermeisterei of Horschbach, however, remained in force until 1968, when there was sweeping administrative restructuring in Rhineland-Palatinate. Horschbach then lost its administrative function, and since 1972 it has been an Ortsgemeinde within the Verbandsgemeinde of Altenglan. In 1956, a third schoolhouse was built. Like the first one, it is now used as a house. In 1968, 23 years after the war ended, the warriors’ memorial for those who fell in the Second World War was built. That same year, the church got a new organ. In a turnaround from what was the pattern in Weimar times, left-leaning parties now do somewhat better in local elections, if not as strongly as in the other Herrmannsberg municipalities of Elzweiler and Welchweiler. In 1972, the “Mühlgärten und Steinbach” building plan was set forth. In 1973, Horschbach came in second at the district level in the contest Unser Dorf soll schöner werden (“Our village should become lovelier”), and the renovated church (new pews and heating) became ready for use. Modern sewerage was laid in 1975. In 1976 came the last day of school. The local primary school was closed on 28 July, as the ones in Elzweiler (27 June 1973) and Welchweiler (30 November 1966) already had been. The schoolchildren thereafter had to go to school in Rammelsbach. Another building plan was set forth in 1998, “Am Hofacker”. A linking street was built to the site the following year. In 2009, a photovoltaic array was installed on the former schoolhouse's roof.

=== Population development ===
Of the three Herrmannsberg municipalities of Horschbach, Elzweiler and Welchweiler, Horschbach was at almost every time in history the biggest. Originally, most people earned their livelihoods at farming, though quite early on, some inhabitants began to specialize in crafts. According to a 1477 taxation roll, there were only three people in the village liable to pay taxes. In 1515, seven households were counted. It must be borne in mind, however, that as a result of deaths due to constant epidemics, the population figures sometimes underwent great swings. For 1609, documents from the ecclesiastical visitation show that there were 76 inhabitants living in 13 families. During the Thirty Years' War, the population once again shrank sharply, only to climb quickly in the early 18th century. In 1743, the village counted 132 souls at 26 hearths (that is to say, households). Of the 26 men who headed families, 19 worked at craft occupations. At the turn of the 19th century, the population figures were once again growing fast. The Kingdom of Bavaria announced the following population figures for Horschbach and Elzweiler together: 451 for 1827, 614 for 1835 and 662 for 1850. There was thus no continuous rise in the figures throughout the 19th century. On the contrary, it is believed that the village's population peaked at over 400 sometime in the earlier half of the 19th century. There must also have been heavy population losses due to emigration. As early as the 19th century, it is known that 13 families sought new lives abroad. Seven went to the United States while the other six went to lands in the Balkan Peninsula. As the 19th century wore on, emigration to the United States grew. By 1970, population figures were subject to only slight swings. Then came a sharp downswing towards today's level of about 300. This fall can be ascribed to the distance to economic centres and the rather unfavourable local transport links. The trend continues with people still moving out of Horschbach, although on the other hand, their favourably priced empty houses and flats ensure that there are also newcomers. This has led to a marked shift in the population's age structure towards greater ages.

The following table shows population development over the centuries for Horschbach:

Year	1875	1885	1900	1910	1939	1962	1967	1970	1971	1972	1973	1974	2007
Total	360	375	361	381	394	365	338	356	361	353	346	355	269

=== Municipality’s name ===
The name has taken the following forms over the ages: Horgesbach (1336), Horginsbach and Harrisbach (14th century), Hargessbach (1393), Hargessbach (1460), Harsbach (1480), Horrsbach (1528), Hornsbach (1550), Horßbach (1573), Horspach (1614), Horschbach (1824). In 1709, the current spelling of the village's name, Horschbach, appeared. The placename ending —bach (“brook”) is a very common one locally; most villages with names ending in —bach were founded sometime around the 8th century. To this ending is prefixed the syllable Horsch—, which goes back to a personal name. Researchers Dolch and Greule believe it to have been Hargun. There was another interpretation, now discounted by today's placename researchers, that held that it derived from the word Harun (“grove”; Modern High German, Hain). Yet another interpretation is found at Horschbach's own website, stating that the prefix derives from harges, a word for “sanctuary” or “place of worship”.

== Religion ==
Church history in the time of the Reformation was characterized by belonging to the Archbishopric of Mainz and the Glan chapter. Although Horschbach was the seat of an Unteramt as early as the Late Middle Ages, it was not the seat of a parish, and indeed until the late 18th century, it did not even have its own village church. In the Reformation, the villagers all converted in 1556, as Rhinegravial subjects, to Lutheranism, and were still Lutheran in 1595 when the village was ceded by the Rhinegraviate to the Duchy of Palatinate-Zweibrücken, which had already converted to Calvinism. Even so, most people in Horschbach also converted to Calvinism. After the Thirty Years' War, though, there were once again Lutheran villagers, and beginning in the late 17th century, also Catholic ones. Of the 132 inhabitants in 1743, 117 were Reformed (Calvinist), 11 were Lutheran and 4 were Roman Catholic. The high share of the population that was Protestant, roughly 97%, shrank only slightly in the centuries that followed, although in more recent times, the drop in the Protestants’ population share has been a bit more marked (96% in 1961, 86% in 1997). The mother church was originally the Hirsauer Kirche, a very old country church near Hundheim, and later it was the Church of Hinzweiler. The church in Horschbach itself was built in 1791 as a “chapel”; it included a 21 m-tall tower. It has Classicist style elements, but interior features all its own, characterized by the use of simple wooden beams. Said to be a particular jewel is the Stumm organ from 1792, which was built into the church in 1822. A bell was also added in 1792. Catholic Christians are tended by the Rammelsbach pastorate.

== Politics ==
=== Municipal council ===
The council is made up of 6 council members, who were elected by majority vote at the municipal election held on 7 June 2009, and the honorary mayor as chairman.

=== Mayors ===
At the 2004 mayoral election, there were no declared candidates, and so Michael Herrmann was chosen by council. In 2009, he was elected, this time by the voters, with 78% of the vote.

The mayors since the establishment of the Verbandsgemeinde have been as follows:

- 1972–1989: Erich Herrmann
- 1989–1998: Karl Schreiner
- 1998–2004: Erich Herrmann
- 2004–: Michael Herrmann

=== Coat of arms ===
The German blazon reads: In Schwarz ein rotgekrönter und bewehrter goldener Löwe, überdeckt von einem silbernen schräg linken Wellenbalken.

The municipality's arms might in English heraldic language be described thus: Sable a bend sinister wavy argent surmounting a lion rampant Or armed langued and crowned gules.

The lion is drawn from an old municipal seal, but also refer to the arms formerly borne by the Duchy of Palatinate-Zweibrücken, while the wavy bend sinister is a canting charge for the last syllable in the village's name (Bach means “brook” in German).

Horschbach formerly bore arms that showed a red tulip with green leaves on a gold field, growing out of green earth, a charge drawn from an 18th-century village seal. These arms, however, were never officially conferred, and only borne as a matter of custom.

The current arms were approved by the now abolished Regierungsbezirk authorities in Neustadt an der Weinstraße and have been borne since 18 July 1975.

== Culture and sightseeing ==
=== Buildings ===
The following are listed buildings or sites in Rhineland-Palatinate’s Directory of Cultural Monuments:

- Protestant church, Alter Weg 7 – aisleless church with ridge turret, 1791; furnishings, organ front 1792, Brothers Stumm; bell, 1792 by Jakob and Paul Klein, Ernstweiler

=== Regular events ===
The kermis (church consecration festival) is held on the third weekend in July. Other old customs have not been preserved in Horschbach.

=== Clubs ===
Horschbach has three clubs: the shooting club, a tennis club and the “Liederkranz” singing club, founded in 1872.

== Economy and infrastructure ==
=== Economic structure ===
In 1898, villagers got their water from two public wells, or one of the 55 private ones. By 1902, however, a watermain had been built. Even as late as 1950, 75% of Horschbach's population worked the land for their livelihoods. Earnings were also to be had in forestry. There was once even winegrowing in Horschbach: in 1879, the municipality had 6 ha of vineyards. There were also, even quite early on, rather a great number of craftsmen in the village. All these industries are in decline nowadays. Agriculture is today nobody's main source of income, with farms being run only as secondary businesses. Forestry is only of lesser importance, and as for crafts, they can hardly truly claim to have any footing in the village anymore. Thus, most workers must now seek their livelihoods elsewhere, commuting to jobs in other centres. Tourism might hold some promise for the future. Its beginnings may lie in gastronomy, which has already arisen in Horschbach.

=== Education ===
In the earlier half of the 18th century, Horschbach got a winter school (a school geared towards an agricultural community's practical needs, held in the winter, when farm families had a bit more time to spare), which was subject to the Hinzweiler “main school”. A report from 1752 says that the school was supported by the Palatinate-Zweibrücken’s quarterly collection. School season lasted from the grape harvest to Holy Week and lessons lasted six hours each day (1753). While other schools often had to be heated with coal, in Horschbach, firewood provided by the municipality was used. Although winter school was held in Horschbach, the municipality had to deliver to the main school in Hinzweiler, even if Horschbach pupils made no use of that school (it was allowed, though), one Malter, three barrels and one Sester of grain, along with a yearly payment of 4 Rhenish guilders, 13 Batzen and 7 Pfennige. For the year 1776, one Jakob Schneider was named as the schoolteacher. In 1820, Horschbach’s first schoolhouse was built. It still stands today, but is used as a house. In 1880, another schoolhouse was built, now somewhat ironically called the “Old Schoolhouse”. Beginning in 1962, Hauptschule students attended classes at the Zentralschule Sankt Julian, and as of 1969 at the Hauptschule Offenbach-St. Julian. The primary school pupils at first stayed in Horschbach. Further school reorganization came with the founding of the Verbandsgemeinden. Since 1974, Hauptschule students have been attending classes at the Hauptschule Altenglan (now the Regionalschule Altenglan), while the primary school pupils have been attending the Grundschule Altenglan in Rammelsbach. The Horschbach schoolhouse has since been torn down.

=== Transport ===
To the southwest runs the Autobahn A 62 (Kaiserslautern–Trier). Even so, Horschbach's location is not particularly favourable for transport. It lies on Landesstraße 368, which links Altenglan with Hinzweiler. Along this stretch of the road runs a public bus route. Linking Landesstraße 368 with Bundesstraße 420 near Glanbrücken is Kreisstraße 29. The Autobahn interchange near Kusel lies some 20 km away. It is 8 km by road to either of the two nearest railway stations at Altenglan and Wolfstein, the former on the Landstuhl–Kusel railway and the latter on the Lauter Valley Railway (Lautertalbahn).

== Famous people ==
=== Honorary citizens ===
- Erich Herrmann (2009) for 40 years of service in municipal politics
