= Elzweiler =

- Municipality
- Coat of arms

- Location of Elzweiler within Kusel district
- Interactive map of Elzweiler
- Location within Germany Location within Rhineland-Palatinate
- Coordinates: 49°34′47″N 7°30′53″E
- Country: Germany
- State: Rhineland-Palatinate
- District: Kusel
- Municipal assoc.: Kusel-Altenglan

Government
  - Mayor (2019–24): Hartmut Jung

Area
  - Total: 2.09 km^{2} (0.81 sq mi)
- Elevation: 250 m (820 ft)

Population (2025-12-31)
  - Total: 109
  - Density: 52.2/km^{2} (135/sq mi)
- Time zone: UTC+01:00 (CET)
  - Summer (DST): UTC+02:00 (CEST)
- Postal codes: 66887
- Dialling codes: 06387
- Vehicle registration: KUS
- Website: www.elzweiler.de

Elzweiler is an Ortsgemeinde – a municipality belonging to a Verbandsgemeinde, a kind of collective municipality – in the Kusel district in Rhineland-Palatinate, Germany. It belongs to the Verbandsgemeinde of Kusel-Altenglan, whose seat is in Kusel.

== Geography ==
=== Location ===
The municipality lies at the entrance to the Sachsbach valley in the Western Palatinate. The village lies at the foot of the 536 m-high Herrmannsberg at an elevation of some 270 m above sea level on the local thoroughfare. Lying right on this only a few hundred metres away in a side valley is the neighbouring village of Welchweiler. The Sachsbach rises some 2 km up from the village of Elzweiler near the Schneeweiderhof and empties into the river Glan near Glanbrücken. In its lower reaches, the stream bears the name Horschbach. The municipal area measures 209 ha, of which 95 ha is wooded.

=== Neighbouring municipalities ===
Elzweiler borders in the north and east on the municipality of Horschbach, in the southeast on the municipality of Eßweiler, in the south on the municipality of Bosenbach and in the west on the municipality of Welchweiler. Elzweiler also meets the municipality of Altenglan at a single point in the southwest.

=== Municipality’s layout ===
The village's houses stand on a spur road that branches off the Glanbrücken-Altenglan through road in the Sachsbach valley and ends behind the village's last houses and at several short sidestreets. As a general rule, houses are simple and often modernized, and belong to commuters. About half the houses were built before 1900. Owing to only slight population growth, the original built-up area has not significantly spread outwards.

== History ==
=== Antiquity ===
Signs of human activity in prehistoric or Roman times in Elzweiler have thus far not been confirmed.

=== Middle Ages ===
Elzweiler is believed to have been founded by the Franks, but an exact founding date for the village cannot be pinpointed, though it is certain that Elzweiler was founded after the Archbishopric of Reims had established the so-called Remigiusland. Going by the border description for the Remigiusland, the small village must have lain right on the border. It could even be that houses on the brook's right bank lay within the Free Imperial Domain (freies Reichsland) while houses on the brook's left bank lay within the Remigiusland. The border's exact 1355 alignment, however, cannot be fully gathered from this oldest surviving description, making much of the matter guesswork. What can be gathered is that the border ran along the brook down from Welchweiler as far as the forks with the Sachsbach, whence it doubled back upstream into the woods. With regard to Elzweiler's territorial allegiance, this had the effect of the village sometimes being seen as part of the Remigiusland and at other times part of the originally Imperially immediate Königsland (“King’s Land”). Apart from the mention of the “Elzweiler Bach” (that is, the Sachsbach) in this 1355 border Weistum (a Weistum – cognate with English wisdom – was a legal pronouncement issued by men learned in law in the Middle Ages and early modern times), the first documentary mention of the village itself is found in a 1364 document, according to which Count Heinrich II of Veldenz transferred the tithes from the villages in the Amt of Altenglan-Brücken, and later the Niederamt of Ulmet, to the newlywed comital couple Lauretta and Heinrich. This younger Heinrich would later become Count Heinrich II of Veldenz. According to this document, Elzweiler belonged to the Remigiusland within the County of Veldenz. As time wore on, though, the village came to be regarded as lying outside the Remigiusland, and it thereby shared a history with the neighbouring village of Horschbach and all those in the Eßweiler Tal (dale).

=== Modern times ===
According to Johannes Hofmann's 1588 description of the Amt of Lichtenberg, the border between the Grumbacher Gebiet and the County Palatine of Zweibrücken ran between the villages of Elzweiler and Welchweiler. In this description, Elzweiler is described as a Hof (“estate” or “farm”), thereby giving a clue as to the village's very small size at that time. Also named in the description is a Kaisermühle (“Emperor’s Mill”), which stood near Elzweiler on the Sachsbach. Another mill, the Lorenzenmühle, later stood between Elzweiler and Horschbach. During the Thirty Years' War, Elzweiler was utterly wiped out. Wartime events and sickness took their heavy toll on the villagers, and by the time the war had ended, there were no longer any people living in the village. Bit by bit, though, it was repopulated with new settlers. In 1594, the village passed together with Niedereisenbach, Hachenbach, Horschbach and the villages in the Eßweiler Tal to Palatinate-Zweibrücken in exchange for Kirchenbollenbach. Thereafter, Elzweiler remained with the County Palatine until its downfall after French Revolutionary troops began their occupation.

==== Recent times ====
During the time of French rule from 1801 to 1814, Elzweiler lay in the Department of Mont-Tonnerre (or Donnersberg in German), whose seat was in Mainz, in the Arrondissement of Kaiserslautern and in the Canton of Wolfstein. After the French had withdrawn in 1814 and Napoleon had been defeated at Waterloo, the Congress of Vienna awarded the Palatinate to the Kingdom of Bavaria. Within this state, Elzweiler lay in the Landkommissariat (later Bezirksamt, then Landkreis, or “rural district”) and the Bürgermeisteramt (“Mayoralty”) of Horschbach, even being merged with Horschbach in 1835 into a single municipality. In the early 1930s, the Nazi Party (NSDAP) was quite popular in Elzweiler. In the 1930 Reichstag elections, 30.6% of the local votes went to Adolf Hitler’s party. By the time of the 1933 Reichstag elections, after Hitler had already seized power, local support for the Nazis had swollen to 83.6%. Hitler’s success in these elections paved the way for his Enabling Act of 1933 (Ermächtigungsgesetz), thus starting the Third Reich in earnest. Since the end of the Second World War, when the Palatinate was split off from Bavaria, the village has lain in the then newly founded state of Rhineland-Palatinate. Originally part of the Bürgermeisterei (“Mayoralty”) of Horschbach, in the course of the 1968 administrative restructuring in Rhineland-Palatinate, Elzweiler was grouped into the Verbandsgemeinde of Altenglan.

=== Population development ===
According to a 1515 description of the Eßweiler Tal, Elzweiler was made up of only two residents, or perhaps households. It can be assumed that there were two farms, whose occupants worked land practically throughout what is now the municipal area, and to whose households belonged not only the farmers and their families, but also menservants and maidservants. Nevertheless, for 1477 and 1478, fifteen villagers who owed taxes were named, leading to the conclusion that the population must have shrunk drastically sometime about the beginning of the 16th century, perhaps as a result of an epidemic. Exact population figures for the village's early history are unknown. Only during the 18th century is it known for certain that there was population growth. According to a 1734 list of subjects, Elzweiler had 32 inhabitants living in seven families. There was also one further inhabitant, a Hintersasse (roughly, “dependent peasant”). Evidently, though, of the seven families then in the village, only two earned their livelihoods at farming. Six of the family heads were craftsmen: a cabinetmaker, a shoemaker, a miller, a blacksmith and a carpenter. The Hintersasse was a bricklayer. During the 18th century, seven families emigrated to Southeast Europe (as far as is known, none went to the Americas). Only because of industrial growth in the late 19th century and in the time before the First World War did workers, too, settle in the village. Eventually, they made up two thirds of the population. After the Second World War, a slight but continuous rise in population could be noted at first, which was followed beginning in 1975 by a likewise slight but continuous drop in population.

The following table shows population development over the centuries for Elzweiler:

Year	1871	1875	1885	1900	1910	1939	1950	1961	1970	1974	1997	2007
Total	164	152	166	173	196	185	185	194	205	217	177	126

=== Municipality’s name ===
The village's name has taken the following forms over the ages: Eltzenbach (1355), Eltzwijlre (1364), Eltzwiller (1512), Eltzwiler (1515), Eltzweiller (1593). The common placename ending —weiler, meaning “hamlet” or, originally, “homestead”, indicates that the village was founded sometime before the 12th century as a homestead. The prefix Elz— might be derived from a personal name. According to researchers Dolch and Greule, this name might have come from Agiwalt. This was later corrupted to Eiwalt and eventually shortened to Elt and Etz. If this holds true, the name's original meaning was “Agiwalt’s homestead”.

=== Vanished villages ===
Filhop, named in Hofmann's 1588 work mentioned above, had at that time already been abandoned. Its name still appears in rural cadastral toponyms within Elzweiler's limits, however.

== Religion ==
Today, it is hard to be sure of the villagers’ original ecclesiastical orientation. Right up until the late 18th century, the nearest church was the country chapel near Ulmet. After the placename Elzweiler appeared in the 1365 Veldenz document, the village may at least for a time have belonged to the Ulmet parish. During the time when Elzweiler belonged to the Rhinegraviate of Grumbach, however, it lay within the sway of the Eßweiler Tal and the Hirsauer Kirche (an ancient country church, still standing today, near Offenbach-Hundheim), and later the Church of Hinzweiler. At the time of the Reformation, the village belonged to the Rhinegraviate of Grumbach, and accordingly, under the principle of cuius regio, eius religio, Elzweiler's inhabitants, like all Rhinegravial subjects, had to convert to Lutheranism in 1556. When the village was incorporated into the County Palatine of Zweibrücken, the Zweibrücken subjects had already converted to Calvinism, and Elzweiler's inhabitants now had to follow suit. It can, however, be gathered from the 1734 list of subjects that of the then 33 inhabitants, 14 were Lutheran, 11 were Catholic and indeed only seven were Reformed. This rather striking variety in the denominations represented in the village can be explained by new settlers coming to repopulate the village after the Thirty Years' War and during French King Louis XIV's occupation. In the late 17th century, the French promoted the Roman Catholic faith, while the Swedish kings, who then held sway in the County Palatine, did the same with the Lutheran faith. Today, 90% of Elzweiler's inhabitants are Evangelical. The Evangelical Christians belong to the parish of Hinzweiler and attend the chapel of ease in Horschbach. The Catholic Christians are tended by the Church of Rammelsbach.

== Politics ==
=== Municipal council ===
The council is made up of 6 council members, who were elected by majority vote at the municipal election held on 7 June 2009, and the honorary mayor as chairman.

=== Mayor ===
Elzweiler's mayor is Hartmut Jung, and his deputy is Martin Knoblauch.

=== Coat of arms ===
The municipality's arms might be described thus: Per fess Or a demilion gules armed and langued azure and azure an anchor of the first.

The charge in base is an anchor, but this is of unknown meaning. The upper field shows the lion charge borne by the village's former lords.

The arms have been borne since 7 April 1975 when they were approved by the now defunct Rheinhessen-Pfalz Regierungsbezirk administration in Neustadt an der Weinstraße. Until that date, the municipality bore arms azure and anchor Or (a blue field charged with a gold anchor), without the lion, although these arms had never officially been granted.

Therefore, the municipality legally had no arms, nor even a seal. According to Otto Hupp in his Die Wappen und Siegel der deutschen Städte, Flecken und Dörfer, Heft 7: Die Ortswappen und Gemeindesiegel der Rheinpfalz (1928) p. 36, though, a 1738 legal document was sealed with the Eltzweiler Gemein Siegel (Siegel means “seal” in German), which bore an anchor as its only device. Hupp then drew an unofficial coat of arms, but it was In Blau ein goldener Adler (“Azure an eagle Or”, that is, a blue field charged with a gold eagle).

Elzweiler belonged until 1595 to the Waldgraves and Rhinegraves of Kyrburg, and thereafter to the Duchy of Palatinate-Zweibrücken, both of whose lords bore the lion as an heraldic device, the Palatines a gold one on a black field, and the Waldgraves a red one on a gold field. The current armorial design combines the anchor seal mentioned by Hupp (which apparently can no longer be confirmed) and the lion charge borne by the village's former lords. The Waldgraves’ red-on-gold version was adopted because it otherwise so seldom crops up in Palatine heraldry, and also, especially, because it was felt that using the Palatinate-Zweibrücken gold-on-black version would have made it necessary to modify the tinctures.

== Culture and sightseeing ==
=== Old walls ===
The old, now ruined, town walls can still be made out.

=== Regular events ===
The only old festival still held is the kermis (church consecration festival, locally known as the Kerb), on the third weekend in June. There is also a summer festival in July.

=== Clubs ===
The only club in Elzweiler currently is a countrywomen's club (Landfrauenverein).

== Economy and infrastructure ==
=== Economic structure ===
In 1970, Elzweiler's occupational structure broke down thus: agriculture and forestry 6.3%, manufacturing 41%, trade and transport 8.3%, service industries 10%, retired 34%. The field of agriculture has further shrunk since then, while the number of retired workers has grown. The great majority of people in the workforce must commute to jobs elsewhere.

=== Education ===
It is unknown when a school was first opened in Elzweiler. Children might have attended a winter school (a school geared towards an agricultural community's practical needs, held in the winter, when farm families had a bit more time to spare) in neighbouring Welchweiler in the course of the 18th century. During the 19th century, the village got its own schoolhouse and thereafter school was taught in one room. Beginning in 1962, Hauptschule students were taught at the central school in Sankt Julian (Zentralschule Sankt Julian), and as of 1969 at the Hauptschule Offenbach-St. Julian. Primary school pupils from Elzweiler and Welchweiler were still taught at the Elzweiler school at first, but even this school did not last very long, and with the introduction of Verbandsgemeinden, schooling was thoroughly reorganized. Since 1974, the Hauptschule students have been attending the Hauptschule Altenglan (now actually a Regionale Schule), while the primary school pupils have been attending the Grundschule Altenglan in Rammelsbach.

=== Transport ===
Elzweiler is a commuter community lying on Landesstraße 368 between Altenglan and Hinzweiler. To the southwest runs the Autobahn A 62 (Kaiserslautern–Trier); the nearest Autobahn interchanges, near Kusel and Glan-Münchweiler, each lie some 15 km away.

Serving Altenglan, 5 km away, is Altenglan station on the Landstuhl–Kusel railway. There are hourly trains at this station throughout the day, namely Regionalbahn service RB 67 between Kaiserslautern and Kusel, named Glantalbahn after a former railway line that shared a stretch of its tracks with the Landstuhl–Kusel railway.
