= Welchweiler =

- Municipality
- Coat of arms

- Location of Welchweiler within Kusel district
- Interactive map of Welchweiler
- Location within Germany Location within Rhineland-Palatinate
- Coordinates: 49°34′37″N 7°30′23″E
- Country: Germany
- State: Rhineland-Palatinate
- District: Kusel
- Municipal assoc.: Kusel-Altenglan

Government
  - Mayor (2019–24): Horst Christoffel

Area
  - Total: 3.48 km^{2} (1.34 sq mi)
- Elevation: 250 m (820 ft)

Population (2025-12-31)
  - Total: 178
  - Density: 51.1/km^{2} (132/sq mi)
- Time zone: UTC+01:00 (CET)
  - Summer (DST): UTC+02:00 (CEST)
- Postal codes: 66887
- Dialling codes: 06387
- Vehicle registration: KUS
- Website: www.welchweiler.com

Welchweiler is an Ortsgemeinde – a municipality belonging to a Verbandsgemeinde, a kind of collective municipality – in the Kusel district in Rhineland-Palatinate, Germany. It belongs to the Verbandsgemeinde of Kusel-Altenglan, whose seat is in Kusel.

== Geography ==
=== Location ===
The municipality lies on the west side of the 536-metre-high Herrmannsberg in the Western Palatinate. The village's elevation is some 300 m above sea level and it lies on a small stream called the Welchbach, which runs down into the Sachsbach. From the foot of the Herrmannsberg, Welchweiler is split by a narrow ridge and the valley of the Sachsbach. The Sachsbach empties into the river Glan and is known in its lower reaches as the Horschbach. Welchweiler lies only a few hundred metres from the village of Elzweiler, which itself lies in the valley of the Sachsbach. Welchweiler's municipal area measures 348 ha, of which 5 ha is wooded.

=== Neighbouring municipalities ===
Welchweiler borders in the north on the municipality of Horschbach, in the east on the municipality of Elzweiler, in the south on the municipality of Altenglan, in the southwest on the municipality of Bedesbach and in the northwest on the municipality of Sankt Julian. Welchweiler also meets the municipalities of Ulmet and Bosenbach at single points in the west and southeast respectively.

=== Municipality’s layout ===
Most of Welchweiler's houses stand alongside the Kreisstraße that runs from Glanbrücken to Altenglan on small village streets. The village expanded only slightly in the 19th century, and there was likewise not a great deal of growth after the Second World War. Most houses are farmhouses of the Einfirsthaus type (“one-roof-ridge house”), and there are also smaller workers’ houses.

== History ==
=== Antiquity ===
Thus far, no prehistoric archaeological finds have turned up in the Welchweiler area. It could be that the area west of the Herrmannsberg was only settled in early Frankish times.

=== Middle Ages ===
From the time of its founding, Welchweiler lay within the so-called Remigiusland, whose borders are laid out precisely in a 1355 Weistum (a Weistum – cognate with English wisdom – was a legal pronouncement issued by men learned in law in the Middle Ages and early modern times). The village was originally independent of the Archbishopric of Reims and the Abbey of Saint-Remi in Reims. After Gerlach I of Veldenz had founded the County of Veldenz in 1136 and been raised to Schutzvogt (roughly, “protector”) over the Remigiusland, the Counts of Veldenz were also deemed to be the local lords. In 1320, Welchweiler had its first documentary mention as Weldichwilre. According to the document itself, Archbishop Baldwin of Trier received three Rhinegravial Burgmannen, the brothers Heinrich, Gerhard and Simon from Heppenheim (today an outlying centre of Worms), as armed men in his service, enfeoffing them with, among other things, a piece of land near Welchweiler. Welchweiler was also mentioned in the well known 1365 document in which Heinrich II of Veldenz bequeathed to his son, who later became Heinrich III, and to his wife, Lauretta of Spanheim, the tithes from the whole Unteramt of Altenglan and Brücken. The Counts of Veldenz died out in the male line in 1444, and the last count's bequest was to his daughter Anna, who had earlier married Count Palatine Stephan, one of King Ruprecht's sons. Stephan merged his own Palatinate holdings with his wife's inheritance and founded the County Palatine of Zweibrücken, which eventually came to be known as the Duchy of Palatinate-Zweibrücken.

=== Modern times ===
Welchweiler now shared a history with the County Palatine of Zweibrücken until this state was swept away in the throes of the French Revolution in 1801. In the Thirty Years' War, the village was repeatedly occupied and destroyed by the various combatants. Warfare and the Plague decimated the populace. Indeed, it is likely that after the war the village had to be newly settled. In the 18th century there was noticeable growth in the population.

==== Recent times ====
During the time of Napoleonic French rule, from 1801 to 1814, Welchweiler belonged to the Mairie (“Mayoralty”) of Horschbach, the Canton of Wolfstein, the Arrondissement of Kaiserslautern and the Department of Mont-Tonnerre (or Donnersberg in German), whose capital was at Mainz. Even after the Palatinate had been awarded to the Kingdom of Bavaria at the Congress of Vienna, Welchweiler still belonged to the Canton of Wolfstein, but now this lay within the Landcommissariat of Kusel – later the Bezirksamt of Kusel, and later still the Landkreis (“rural district” – the designation it still bears today) of Kusel. Throughout Bavarian times (the kingdom came to an end with the German Kaiser's and the Bavarian king's abdications in 1918), Weimar times, the Third Reich and even into West German times up until 1968 – by which time Welchweiler found itself in the state of Rhineland-Palatinate – the village belonged to the Bürgermeisterei (“Mayoralty”) of Horschbach. In the late 1920s and early 1930s, the Nazi Party (NSDAP) became quite popular in Welchweiler, although support was not high early on. In the 1928 Reichstag elections, only 1.1% of the local votes went to Adolf Hitler’s party, and in the 1930 Reichstag elections, this had sunk to 0%. By the time of the 1933 Reichstag elections, though, after Hitler had already seized power, local support for the Nazis had swollen to 49.3%. Hitler’s success in these elections paved the way for his Enabling Act of 1933 (Ermächtigungsgesetz), thus starting the Third Reich in earnest. After the Second World War, the Palatinate ceased to be a Bavarian exclave and was incorporated into Rhineland-Palatinate. In the course of administrative restructuring in that state in 1968, Welchweiler was grouped as an Ortsgemeinde into the Verbandsgemeinde of Altenglan in 1972. The inhabitants’ voting patterns are distinguished by the tendency always to give the SPD a healthy majority. This pattern had in principle already been established before 1933.

=== Population development ===
The villagers originally made their living at agriculture, but later many earned their livelihood as day labourers and forestry workers. Today most of the villagers who are in the workforce are employed at jobs outside Welchweiler and must commute. Owing to the rather unfavourable transport conditions, the village's population has been shrinking for decades. At the time of the 1609 ecclesiastical Visitation by the Oberamt of Lichtenberg, there were 106 inhabitants. After the population was wiped out by sickness and the Thirty Years' War, the village needed to be settled all over again. In 1675, there were nine families, and by 1688 there were 14 once again. This fell again to 10 families in 1693 and 11 in 1704, mainly through the ravages of the wars waged by King Louis XIV.

The following table shows population development over the centuries for Welchweiler, with some figures broken down by religious denomination:

Year	1609	1675	1688	1825	1835	1871	1905	1939	1961	1997	2005
Total	106	~50	~80	254	318	313	390	395	350	242	209
Catholic				15					23
Evangelical				239					327

=== Municipality’s name ===
In 1320, the village's name was Weldichwilre, in 1364 it was Welchwijlre, in 1460 Welchwillr and in 1588 Welchweiler. The placename ending —weiler goes back to the Romance word villare and means homestead or farm (as a standalone German word, Weiler nowadays means “hamlet”). While only a few places with names ending in —weiler arose in the early days of Frankish settlement, new foundings – homesteads and little villages – whose names took this ending were being named as late as the 13th century. Nonetheless, Welchweiler might already have arisen by the 7th century as a single homestead. As for the prefix, this might have been a Germanic given name, Weldicho.

== Religion ==
Religious development in Welchweiler unfolded in step with the ecclesiastical history of the Remigiusland, the County of Veldenz and the Duchy of Palatinate-Zweibrücken, that is with conversion at the time of the Reformation in 1545 and a further conversion to Calvinism in 1588. To this day, the population is overwhelmingly Evangelical. Welchweiler belonged in the Middle Ages, within the Glan chapter, to the parish of Ulmet. The village does not have its own church. The Evangelical Christians today belong to the parish of Hinzweiler and attend church in Horschbach. Catholics are served by the parish of Rammelsbach.

== Politics ==
=== Municipal council ===
The council is made up of 6 council members, who were elected by majority vote at the municipal election held on 7 June 2009, and the honorary mayor as chairman.

=== Mayor ===
Welchweiler's mayor is Horst Christoffel, and his deputies are Volker Metzger and Manfred Forster.

=== Coat of arms ===
The German blazon reads: Von Schwarz und Silber gespalten, rechts zwei goldene übereinander gestellte ‚W‘, links ein rotbezungter und rotbewehrter blauer Löwe.

The municipality's arms might in English heraldic language be described thus: Per pale sable two Ws in pale Or and argent a lion rampant azure armed and langued gules.

The two Ws on the dexter (armsbearer's right, viewer's left) side are an abbreviation of the municipality's name, Welchweiler. This charge appeared on a village seal as early as 1742. The lion on the sinister (armsbearer's left, viewer's right) side is drawn from the arms formerly borne by the Duchy of Palatinate-Zweibrücken; it is the heraldic device of the House of Wittelsbach, which ruled Bavaria until 1918.

=== Regular events ===
Welchweiler holds its kermis (church consecration festival, locally known as the Kerwe) on the second weekend in August.

=== Clubs ===
Welchweiler's assortment of clubs is not particularly well developed, but there are three:

- Spielvereinigung Hermannsberg/Welchweiler (sport playing association)
- Obst- und Gartenbauverein Welchweiler/Elzweiler (fruitgrowing and gardening)
- Landfrauenverein Welchweiler (countrywomen's club)

== Economy and infrastructure ==
=== Economic structure ===
Agricultural operations in Welchweiler have to a great extent been given up. Work within the municipality (in forestry and quarrying) is losing importance. Most of the workers must thus commute to and from jobs outside the village. Tourism might offer the village a chance at prosperity.

=== Education ===
It is unknown when the village's first school was established in Welchweiler. At first, classes were only held at a winter school (a school geared towards an agricultural community's practical needs, held in the winter, when farm families had a bit more time to spare). In 1784, the 27-year-old teacher Johann Geibel from Erzweiler (a now vanished village near Ulmet forsaken by its last few inhabitants in 1974 after having been incorporated into the Baumholder Troop Drilling Ground by the Nazis in 1933) served to bolster the teaching staff at the winter school in Welchweiler. The local school was thereby subject to the Ulmet “main school”, to which the municipality had to send 5 barrels and 2 Sester of corn, and also money: 3 Gulden, 5 Batzen and 12 Pfennige. During the 19th century, the village acquired its own school building, and thereafter, classes were held in a single room. In 1962, the local school was closed, and then all Hauptschule students attended school at the Zentralschule Sankt Julian (as of 1969 Hauptschule Offenbach-St. Julian), while the primary school pupils went to the Elzweiler schoolhouse along with schoolchildren from that neighbouring village. From 1964 to 1966, the Welchweiler schoolhouse underwent a conversion into a community centre. Even the Elzweiler school did not last much longer, and with the establishment of Verbandsgemeinden came a thoroughly new school organization. Since 1974, Hauptschule students have been attending the Hauptschule (now Regionale Schule) Altenglan, while the primary school pupils have been attending the Grundschule Altenglan in Rammelsbach.

=== Transport ===
Welchweiler's transport situation is not particularly favourable. Landesstraße 368 between Altenglan and Hinzweiler runs through the village. Direct road links have been built to Bedesbach and Sankt Julian by way of Kreisstraßen 27 and 36. The nearest railway station is at Altenglan on the Landstuhl–Kusel railway (and formerly on the now closed Glantalbahn), 5 km away. The nearest Autobahn interchanges, at Glan-Münchweiler and Kusel, are each about 15 km away, on the A 62 (Kaiserslautern–Trier), southwest of Welchweiler.
