= Altenglan (Verbandsgemeinde) =

Coordinates: 49.550°N 7.461°E

Altenglan is a former Verbandsgemeinde ("collective municipality") in the district of Kusel, Rhineland-Palatinate, Germany. In January 2018, it was merged into the new Verbandsgemeinde Kusel-Altenglan. The seat of the Verbandsgemeinde was in Altenglan.

== Municipalities ==
The Verbandsgemeinde Altenglan consisted of the following Ortsgemeinden ("local municipalities"):

1. Altenglan
2. Bedesbach
3. Bosenbach
4. Elzweiler
5. Erdesbach
6. Föckelberg
7. Horschbach
8. Neunkirchen am Potzberg
9. Niederalben
10. Niederstaufenbach
11. Oberstaufenbach
12. Rammelsbach
13. Rathsweiler
14. Rutsweiler am Glan
15. Ulmet
16. Welchweiler
