= Saint-Julien, Côte-d'Or =

Saint-Julien
- Commune
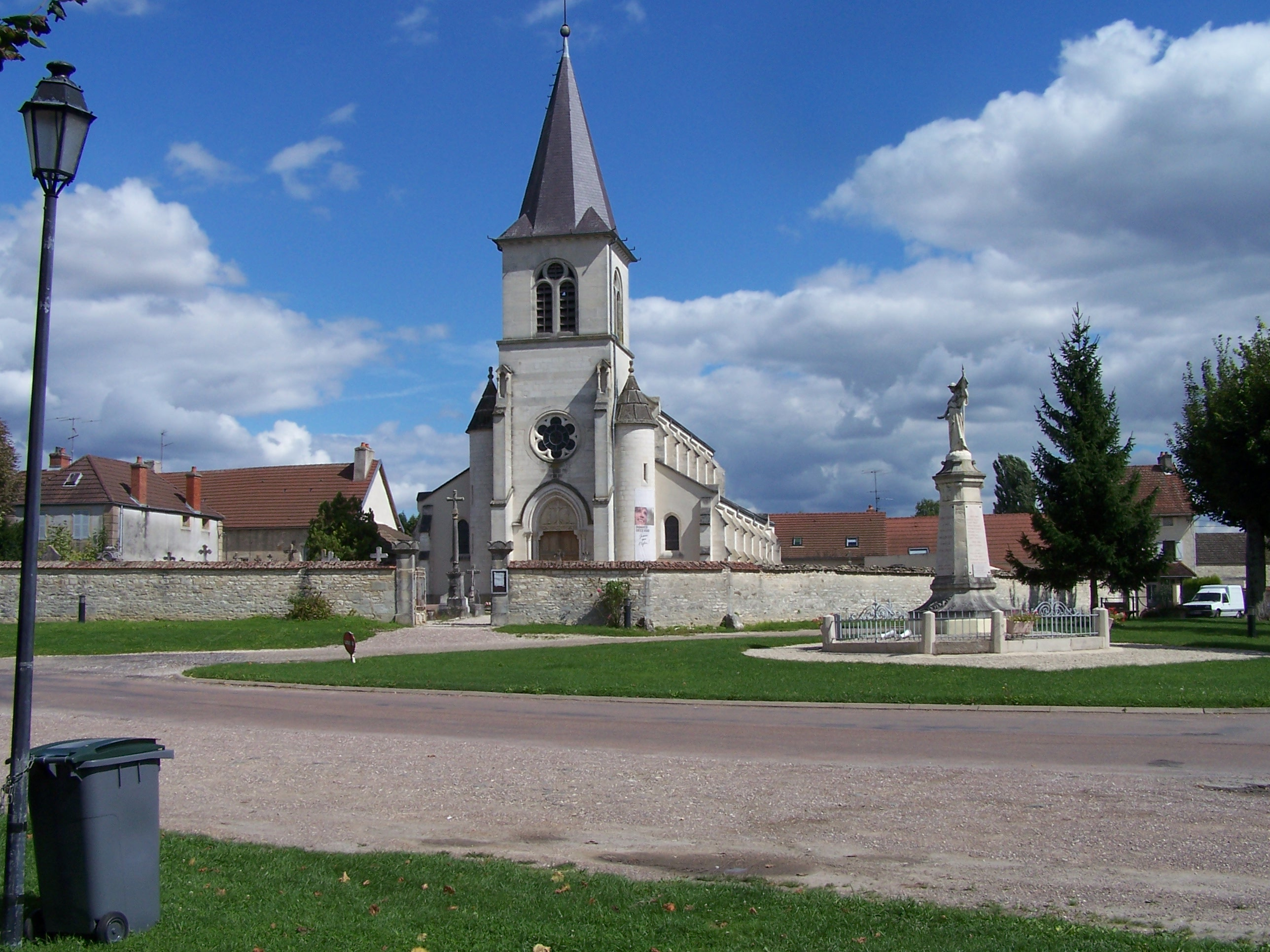
- The church in Saint-Julien

- Coat of arms
- Location of Saint-Julien
- Location within France Location within Bourgogne-Franche-Comté
- Coordinates: 47°24′06″N 5°08′39″E
- Country: France
- Region: Bourgogne-Franche-Comté
- Department: Côte-d'Or
- Arrondissement: Dijon
- Canton: Fontaine-lès-Dijon

Government
  - Mayor (2020–2026): Michel Lenoir
- Area^{1}: 16.43 km^{2} (6.34 sq mi)
- Elevation: 245 m (804 ft)
- Highest elevation: 273 m (896 ft)
- Lowest elevation: 225 m (738 ft)
- Population (2023): 1,864
  - Density: 113.5/km^{2} (293.8/sq mi)
- Time zone: UTC+01:00 (CET)
  - Summer (DST): UTC+02:00 (CEST)
- INSEE/Postal code: 21555 /21490
- ^{1} French Land Register data, which excludes lakes, ponds, glaciers > 1 km^{2} (0.386 sq mi or 247 acres) and river estuaries.

Saint-Julien (French pronunciation: [sɛ̃ ʒyljɛ̃]) is a commune in the Côte-d'Or department in eastern France.

== Population ==
Historical population
Year	Pop.	±% p.a.
1968	519	—
1975	731	+5.01%
1982	1,124	+6.34%
1990	1,221	+1.04%
1999	1,218	−0.03%
2007	1,377	+1.55%
2012	1,466	+1.26%
2017	1,477	+0.15%
2023	1,864	+3.95%
Source: INSEE

== Town partnerships ==
Saint-Julien fosters partnerships with Sankt Julian, Kusel district, Rhineland-Palatinate, Germany since 1985.

== See also ==
- Communes of the Côte-d'Or department
