= Bedesbach =

- Municipality
- Coat of arms

- Location of Bedesbach within Kusel district
- Interactive map of Bedesbach
- Location within Germany Location within Rhineland-Palatinate
- Coordinates: 49°33′57″N 7°27′26″E
- Country: Germany
- State: Rhineland-Palatinate
- District: Kusel
- Municipal assoc.: Kusel-Altenglan

Government
  - Mayor (2019–24): Peter Koch

Area
  - Total: 4.43 km^{2} (1.71 sq mi)
- Elevation: 200 m (660 ft)

Population (2025-12-31)
  - Total: 770
  - Density: 170/km^{2} (450/sq mi)
- Time zone: UTC+01:00 (CET)
  - Summer (DST): UTC+02:00 (CEST)
- Postal codes: 66885
- Dialling codes: 06381
- Vehicle registration: KUS
- Website: www.bedesbach.de

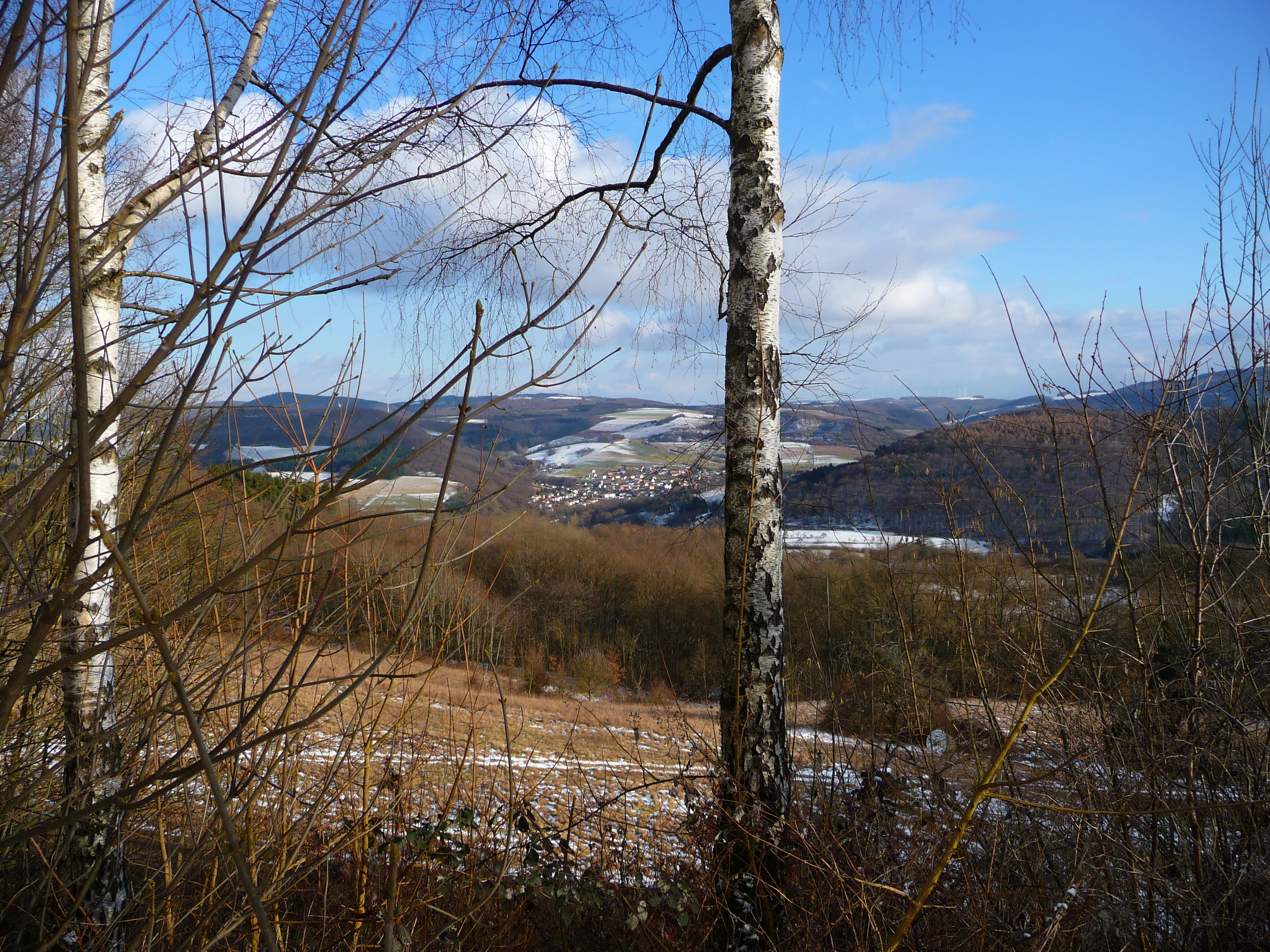
View of Bedesbach from the K22

Bedesbach is an Ortsgemeinde – a municipality belonging to a Verbandsgemeinde, a kind of collective municipality – in the Kusel district in Rhineland-Palatinate, Germany. It belongs to the Verbandsgemeinde of Kusel-Altenglan, whose seat is in Kusel. Bedesbach is also a state-recognized tourist resort.

== Geography ==
=== Location ===
The municipality lies in the Kusel Musikantenland (“Minstrels’ Land”) in the Western Palatinate on the river Glan. Bedesbach lies on the river's right bank, across from Patersbach over on the left bank, at an elevation of roughly 200 m above sea level.

The mountains that edge the valley reach elevations of about 400 m above from the sea level (Sulzberg 402 m, Hohenestel with cabin and lookout tower 399 m, Bächelskopf 357 m). The Sulzbach, which rises east of the village at the Birkenhübel (298 m), flows along a short course, emptying into the Glan downstream from the village. The municipal area measures 443 ha, of which 44 ha is wooded.

=== Neighbouring municipalities ===
Bedesbach borders in the north on the municipality of Ulmet, in the east on the municipality of Welchweiler, in the south and west on the municipality of Altenglan and in the northwest on the municipality of Erdesbach. Bedesbach also meets the municipality of Sankt Julian at a single point in the northeast.

Also belonging to Bedesbach is the outlying homestead of Sulzbacher Hof.

=== Municipality’s layout ===
The core of this village, which was originally a small clump village, lies on a low, flat elevation at the valley's edge, an expanse of land that is somewhat shielded against flooding. In this part of the village, the old houses built for farming that still stand out clearly. In the expansions before the Second World War down the valley and back from the river towards the mountains, a mixture of building forms arose. After the war, farther down the valley in the bow of the Sulzbach and on the mountain slope (Schleidchen), a new, looser housing development was built with many single-family dwellings, and a few multiple-family dwellings. Small industrial facilities are built into the residential area. Village renewal and property boundary rationalization (a kind of Flurbereinigung called Ortslagenflurbereinigung) were also undertaken to promote tourism. Bedesbach has several times been the district-level winner in the contest Unser Dorf soll schöner werden (“Our village should become lovelier”).

== History ==
=== Antiquity ===
Unearthed on a flat-topped hillock not far from the graveyard was a quartz knife blade, likely from the Stone Age. This archaeological find shows that the area was settled long before the village was founded. It is also certain that there were people in the area of what is now Bedesbach in the Bronze Age, the Iron Age and Roman times, as finds from these times bear witness.

=== Middle Ages ===
The village itself was founded in the Early Middle Ages, some 500 years before the thus far earliest known documentary mention in a 1364 document. Bedesbach lay in the so-called Remigiusland, which was transferred in the mid 12th century to the Counts of Veldenz as a Schutzvogtei, whereby the Counts were the territory's “protectors”. According to the 1364 document, all villages in the Amt of Altenglan-Brücken, and thereby also Bedesbach, had to pay for the provisioning of the newlyweds Heinrich (III) von Veldenz and Lauretta von Sponheim, who had chosen Lichtenberg Castle as their residential seat. Bedesbach stayed with the County of Veldenz until 1444, when the last Count of Veldenz died.

He did indeed have an heir, but it was a daughter, and she could not inherit her father's title. She was married to Count Palatine Stephan, who took his wife's inheritance and combined it with his own holdings to form a new state, which in time came to be known as the Duchy of Palatinate-Zweibrücken.

=== Modern times ===
Bedesbach shared this state's history until, like all other feudal states in the region, it was swept away under the tide of the French Revolution. Only a few villagers survived the Thirty Years' War, and the village itself had to be newly settled by newcomers. In the late 17th century, there were once more great losses, this time due to King Louis XIV's wars of conquest. Nevertheless, the village recovered during the 18th century. During the French Revolutionary and Napoleonic times from 1801 to 1814, Bedesbach lay within the Department of Mont-Tonnerre (or Donnersberg in German), in the Arrondissement of Kaiserslautern and in the Canton of Wolfstein. Bedesbach belonged then to the Mairie (“Mayoralty”) of Horschbach, but was also governed temporarily by the Mairie of Ulmet. Beginning in 1817, once the Palatinate had been granted to the Kingdom of Bavaria by the Congress of Vienna, the Canton of Wolfstein was grouped into the Landkommissariat of Kusel and Bedesbach at first remained in the Canton of Wolfstein and the Bürgermeisterei (“Mayoralty”) of Horschbach. In 1836, however, it passed to the Canton of Kusel and the Bürgermeisterei of Altenglan. This arrangement did not change until the 1968 administrative restructuring in Rhineland-Palatinate.

==== Recent times ====
During this 1968 reform, Bedesbach, which in the meantime had grown into a considerable tourism resort, had to fight hard to keep its autonomy. In the course of all the municipal mergers, Bedesbach was at first amalgamated with the neighbouring village of Patersbach and at the same time amalgamated along with Patersbach with Altenglan. The municipality disagreed with the administrative decision and as early as 1970 had got its autonomy back. Since then, Bedesbach has been an Ortsgemeinde within the Verbandsgemeinde of Altenglan.

=== Population development ===
Population figures from the Middle Ages are not available. According to the so-called 1609 Konken Protocols (Konker Protokolle), eleven families with 51 people were living in the village at that time. Only a few survived the Thirty Years' War, and only in the 18th century did the population begin once again to rise healthily. It is known that during this time, seven families emigrated, one to the United States and the other six to the lands in the Balkans. In the 19th century, the number of emigrations rose. The population figures themselves, though, kept rising, almost continuously as a result of the favourable location for living and transport, but also because of particular efforts by the villagers to improve their own economic structure.

The following table shows population development over the centuries for Bedesbach, with some figures broken down by religious denomination:

Year	1825	1835	1871	1905	1939	1961	1973	1997
Total	235	280	333	501	524	642	750	729
Evangelical	219					588
Catholic	10					41
Jewish	6					–

=== Municipality’s name ===
The village's name has taken these forms over the ages: Bechtenspach (1364), Bedesbach (1446), Bechtesbach (1453), Bertzebach (1456), Bettesbach (1593), Pfeddesbach (1573) and Bedesbach (1824). Researcher Ernst Christmann noted “The villages of Bedesbach and Patersbach, lying across from each other, each have a tributary emptying into the Glan here, and these (have) from persons their names.” The first part of Bedesbach's name is thus somebody's name, perhaps the Proto-Germanic name Berthin. According to this version, today's Sulzbach would originally have been the Bedesbach, and the original Sulzbach (today the Horchmannsgraben) would have been a tributary to this Bedesbach or Bechtelsbach.

=== Vanished villages ===
Northeast of Bedesbach, likely in the area where the Sulzbacherhof now lies, once lay the village of Sulzbach which, like Bedesbach itself, had its first documentary mention in 1364 in Heinrich II's document for his son, also named Heinrich, and daughter-in-law, Lauretta von Sponheim. From Sulzbach came the noble family of the Lords of Sulzbach and of Alben, whose representatives were the Habsburg emperor's influential retainers in the Late Middle Ages. In Johannes Hofmann's 1588 description of the Oberamt of Lichtenberg, this village was already described as having vanished. In 1491, it apparently had already fallen into decline. The estate of Sulzbacherhof takes its name from the old village, but is a later founding.

== Religion ==
Bedesbach lay in the Remigiusland, and thereby belonged from the time of its founding to the Church of Reims, although under ecclesiastical organization, it was assigned to the Archbishopric of Mainz. Within regional ecclesiastical organization, the village always belonged to the Church of Altenglan, but for those times when, owing to war, Altenglan ended up without a church. Thus, in the wake of the Thirty Years' War, the villagers were tended by the Church of Ulmet, Bosenbach or Eßweiler.

In the age of the Reformation, all the villagers had converted to Lutheranism by 1534, and then in 1588, on Count Palatine Johannes I's orders, everyone had to convert to Calvinism. Lutherans and Catholics could only set foot in the municipality once again in the late 17th century. The Catholics today belong to the parish of Rammelsbach. A few Jews came to Bedesbach, likely as far back as the 18th century, but already by the time after the First World War, there were no more Jews living in the village.

Of the 235 inhabitants living in Bedesbach in 1825, 219 (92%) were Evangelical, 11 (5%) were Catholic and 6 (3%) were Jewish. Of the 779 inhabitants living in Bedesbach in 1997, 630 (81%) were Evangelical and 62 (8%) were Catholic, while 25 (3%) belonged to other denominations and 62 (8%) professed no religion.

== Politics ==
=== Municipal council ===
The council is made up of 12 council members, who were elected by majority vote at the municipal election held on 7 June 2009, and the honorary mayor as chairman.

=== Mayor ===
Bedesbach's mayor is Peter Koch.

=== Coat of arms ===
The municipality's arms might be described thus: A bend sinister wavy azure between argent a lion rampant sinister issuant from the bend sinister armed and langued gules, and Or a dove wings erect tenné with an olive sprig proper in its beak.

The municipality of Bedesbach belonged in the Middle Ages to the County of Veldenz and later passed to the Duchy of Palatinate-Zweibrücken, with which it remained until the French Revolution. The wavy blue bend sinister (slanted stripe) is a canting charge referring to the last syllable in the municipality's name, —bach, which in German means “brook”. The blue Veldenz lion in silver recalls Bedesbach's past as a Veldenz, and later Zweibrücken, holding. Since Bedesbach also lay in the old Remigiusland, the dove with the olive sprig, Saint Remigius’s attribute, has been incorporated into the arms as a charge. The dove’s tincture, tenné, is not a common one, but is not considered unusual in heraldry, and it is always to be rendered as shown here.

The arms have been borne since 1970, when they were approved by the now defunct Rheinhessen-Pfalz Regierungsbezirk administration.

== Culture and sightseeing ==
=== Buildings ===
The following are listed buildings or sites in Rhineland-Palatinate’s Directory of Cultural Monuments:

- Hauptstraße 6 – Quereinhaus (a combination residential and commercial house divided for these two purposes down the middle, perpendicularly to the street), 1821, barn wing after 1842, commercial yard with well and walnut tree; characterizes village’s appearance
- Near Ringstraße 16 – former smithy; one-floor plastered building, whetstone, mid 19th century; technical equipment

The former schoolhouse was renovated in 2002 and now serves as the village community centre. Nesting in the loft are bats of the species Myotis myotis, the greater mouse-eared bat, Germany’s largest bat species.

=== Regular events ===
Old customs are today observed almost not at all. However, there is a Brunnenfest (“Fountain Festival”) in late May, a kermis (church consecration festival, locally known as the Kerb) on the first weekend in July and the Schmiedefest (“Smithy Festival”) on the last Sunday in August.

=== Museums ===
The old smithy houses a museum that displays the original blacksmithing equipment and keeps the memory of old crafts alive. Viewing and demonstrations can be arranged ahead of time.

=== Clubs ===
Bedesbach has many clubs, some of which even devote themselves to furthering tourism. Foremost among the village's clubs are:

- Countrywomen's club (Landfrauenverein)
- Fruitgrowing and gardening club (Obst- und Gartenbauverein)
- Gymnastic and sport club (Turn- und Sportverein)
- Model sport club (Modellsportclub “Mittleres Glantal” )
- Seniors’ club (Rentnerverein)
- Singing and conversation club (Gesang- und Unterhaltungsverein)
- SPD local club (SPD Ortsverein)
- Tennis club (Tennisclub)
- Transport club (Verkehrsverein)
- Volunteer fire brigade (Freiwillige Feuerwehr)

== Economy and infrastructure ==
=== Economic structure ===
Originally, the inhabitants earned their livelihood mainly at agriculture. Quite early on, though, they sought to exploit mineral wealth. As in many places in the Westrich, an historic region that encompasses areas in both Germany and France, there were also collieries in Bedesbach. Near the limit with Ulmet, as early as 1773, a substantial coal seam was discovered at the Hellerberg (mountain) by a farmer, which the Zweibrücken Chief Mountain Director (Oberbergdirektor) Stahl later had exploited, an endeavour at which over the years Stahl himself and the Duke of Zweibrücken (for his private estate) made a profit of more than 10,000 Gulden. The coal thus mined was used mainly by smiths and lime burners. Since the coal was dug to a certain extent destructively, the mine eventually caved in. A new gallery was built that was roughly 290 m long. The colliery at the Hellerberg was run until 1840, and again for a short while after the First World War. After 1800, there were three further galleries under the collective name Karlsgrube in the Kerzenbach and in the Grundwäldchen (wood). Employed here were four to six workers, who over time mined 2,600 metric tons of coal.

Within municipal limits, there was also lime mining and burning during the 19th century. Quicklime production had to be given up after the Second World War owing to unprofitability.

The attempt to further tourism by furnishing lodgings, putting together an adequate dining sector, creating local facilities and laying out hiking trails was enjoying success even decades ago. Sometimes there were 12,000 overnight stays each year. The tourism boom has, however, not held out.

=== Established businesses ===
Among major enterprises in Bedesbach, the “Baumrech” hard-stone quarry is still in business today, having been opened in 1919 by Eiserfelder Steinwerke. After 1920, the quarry employed for a time 80 workers and daily made from 300 to 400 metric tons of crushed stone. Also of importance was the making of paving stones, with some 60 metric tons being hewn each day. In the time when the Siegfried Line was being built, the quarry managed to raise its general output considerably. Before the Second World War, some 250 workers were employed at the quarry. After the war, production was started again, at first hesitantly, and the rather more insistently once again, although with the now customary economization and automation. Only a few workers now produce several times the amount of crushed stone as those who worked here in bygone days. Among other industries in Bedesbach is a tile-laying company, which also runs a tile wholesaling operation. There are also a planning and construction office, a business that manufactures precision parts for machine building, a big bakery, a stairway-building business and a metalworking business.

=== Transport ===
Bedesbach is well linked to the transport network. The village lies just across the Glan bridge from Bundesstraße 420, which runs through the neighbouring village of Patersbach, a constituent community of Altenglan. To the south lies the Autobahn A 62 (Kaiserslautern–Trier); the Kusel interchange lies some 12 km away. Kreisstraße 36 stands as a direct link to Welchweiler, while Kreisstraße 35 leads to Landesstraße 368, which links Altenglan with Kaiserslautern and leads to the Altenglan swimming pool.

Altenglan station is on the Landstuhl–Kusel railway and the now closed Glan Valley Railway (Glantalbahn). The stretch of the Glantalbahn (a railway formerly running all the way from Homburg in the Saarland to Bad Münster am Stein) running through Odenbach is out of service, having withdrawn service in 1985. On its tracks, visitors may ride draisines during the summer months.

=== Education ===
About the middle of the 18th century, the neighbouring villages of Bedesbach and Patersbach together shared a winter school (a school geared towards an agricultural community's practical needs, held in the winter, when farm families had a bit more time to spare). The first Schuldiener (“school server”) – that is to say, teacher – was, according to records, Johann Scherp, himself a teacher's son from Volksheim. The teacher's recompense consisted of 9 Gulden each year and free board. Each year, to the “Hauptschule” in Altenglan, 1 Malter and 4 Fass of grain had to be yielded up, along with 2 Malter, 3 Fass and 12 Sester of oats, and in money, 8 Gulden, 6 Batzen and 1 Pfennig. It goes without saying that during the time of French rule after 1800, the school was closed for a long time. Later in the 19th century, Bedesbach got its own school. Only in 1938 was it once again merged with the Patersbach school. The school now had three classes, with the lower level attending lessons in Patersbach and the middle and upper levels in Bedesbach. Since 1969, Hauptschule students have been attending the Regionalschule in Altenglan, while the primary school pupils have been attending the Grundschule Altenglan in Rammelsbach. A Realschule, a Gymnasium and vocational schools can be found in Kusel.

The schoolhouse became, after school reform in 1970, the village community centre, used for church services and club functions. It was later thoroughly renovated and then rededicated as the new village community centre in March 2002.

== Famous people ==
=== Sons and daughters of the town ===
- Julius Cappel (b. 1890 in Bedesbach; d. 1961 in Kirchheimbolanden)

Educator, 1946 President of the Evangelical State Synod of the Palatinate, 1949 Regierungsrat and Oberregierungsrat in the Regierungsbezirk administration of Pfalz, organized schooling and teacher training.

- Philipp Dunzweiler (b. 1880 in Bedesbach; d. 1944 in Berlin)

As a Communist, Dunzweiler opposed Adolf Hitler’s Nazi dictatorship during the Third Reich. After his work colleagues denounced him, he was seized, and after being sentenced by the Volksgerichtshof in 1944, he was put to death.
