= Regionale Schule =

German states with "Regionalschulen"

In Germany, a Regionale Schule or Regionalschule (English: "regional school") is a secondary school that allows attaining the graduation of Berufsreife (after nine years) or Mittlere Reife (after ten years). It doesn't include Gymnasium graduation (after 12 or 13 years) like "Integrierte Gesamtschule" and exists only in some states of Germany.

Regionale Schulen are a combination of Hauptschule and Realschule and thus do not allow attaining the "Allgemeine Hochschulreife."
