= Otto Schwarz =

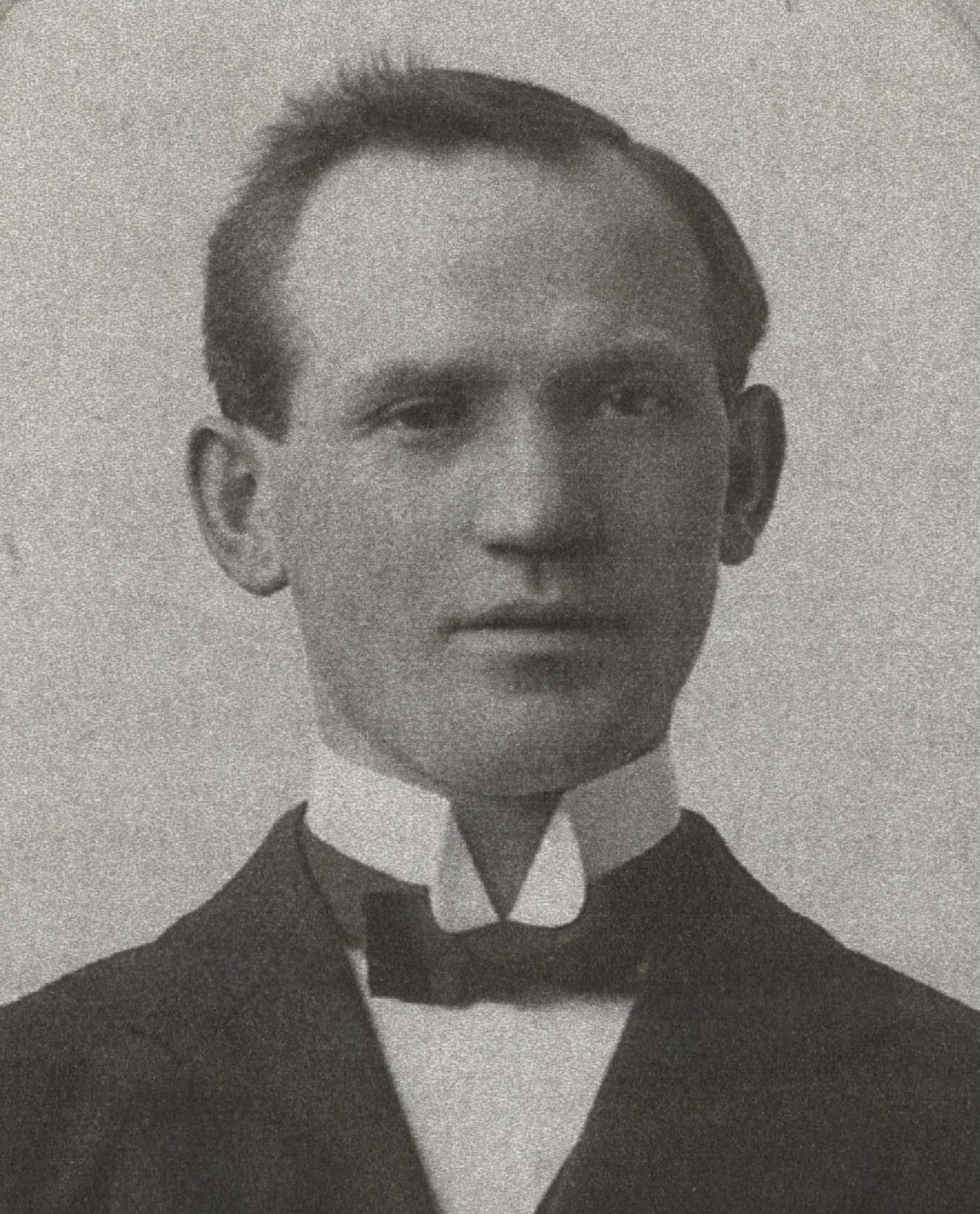
- Schwarz in 1900

Background information
- Born: 10 August 1876; Hinzweiler, Kingdom of Bavaria, German Empire
- Died: 1961 (aged 85) Hinzweiler, Rhineland-Palatinate, West Germany
- Genres: 19th- and 20th-century Bavarian band music
- Occupation: Band leader or Kapellmeister of the Bavarian String Band
- Instruments: Piccolo; clarinet; flute
- Years active: 1890–1914 in England

Otto Schwarz (10 August 1876 – 1961) was a German travelling musician. He was the leader, or Kapellmeister, of a small band of mixed instruments and sometimes vocalists called the Bavarian String Band, which performed in England in the summer months between 1897 and 1914. The band performed mainly outdoors, and primarily in Harrogate, North Riding of Yorkshire, besides other towns. It played Victorian and Edwardian parlour music, as well as extracts from symphonies and operas. At certain charity events, Schwarz would donate the band's collection of the day to local causes, such as hospitals.

At the onset of the First World War, Schwarz and his players were interned and transported to the Isle of Man. Schwarz died in Hinzweiler in 1961.

== Background ==
Otto Schwarz was born on 10 August 1876 in Hinzweiler, Rhineland-Palatinate, Germany. Before borders changed, Hinzweiler was in Bavaria, Germany. He was the son of bandleader Daniel Schwarz and Katharina Zink. (Note: Daniel Schwarz (1851–1885) and Katharina Zink (1852–1918). GRO Index: Deaths Mar 1885 Schwarz Daniel. 34 Knaresbro' 9a 85) On 20 November 1900 Schwarz married Amalia Merker, whom he had known from childhood in Hinzweiler. (Note: Amalia Merker (1877–1954)) They had three children: Wilhelm, Berthold and Marianne. (Note: Wilhelm Schwarz (1901–1986), Berthold Schwarz (1905–1977) and Marianne Schwarz (1911–1998)) On 2 April 1911, Schwarz was renting a house for his band at 13 Valley Road, Harrogate, with his wife Amalia, their son Berthold (born in Bavaria), his younger brother Gustav Adolf and four nephews. (Note: Gustav Adolf Schwarz (1878–1955), a musician in the band) Gustav and the nephews were musicians in the band, and all were born in Bavaria.

== Career ==
Schwarz was a wandermusikant, bandleader, composer, church organist, and music teacher.

=== Training and Jacob Hoffmann's band ===
Schwarz was eight years old when his father died, but he was assisted in following in his father's footsteps by his home town's "close-knit community" and musical culture. In Hinzweiler, the music club "played a strong and central role in public life ... The village music teacher took Otto as a pupil teaching him clarinet, flute and piccolo, for which he had an obvious aptitude". He was apprenticed from the age of 13 years, and travelled with a band during the winters. In England he received encouragement as a travelling musician from Hinzweiler, because in the 19th and early 20th centuries, the itinerant bandsmen or Wandermusikanten from the Upper Palatinate area of Bavaria were "famous in Europe ... Shortly before the First World War there were about 2,500 bands from the former Pfalz locality travelling outside Germany". Around 1890 he became a member of his uncle Jacob Hoffmann's itinerant band, and later travelled to Liverpool and Manchester as leader of one section of that band.

=== Bavarian String Band ===
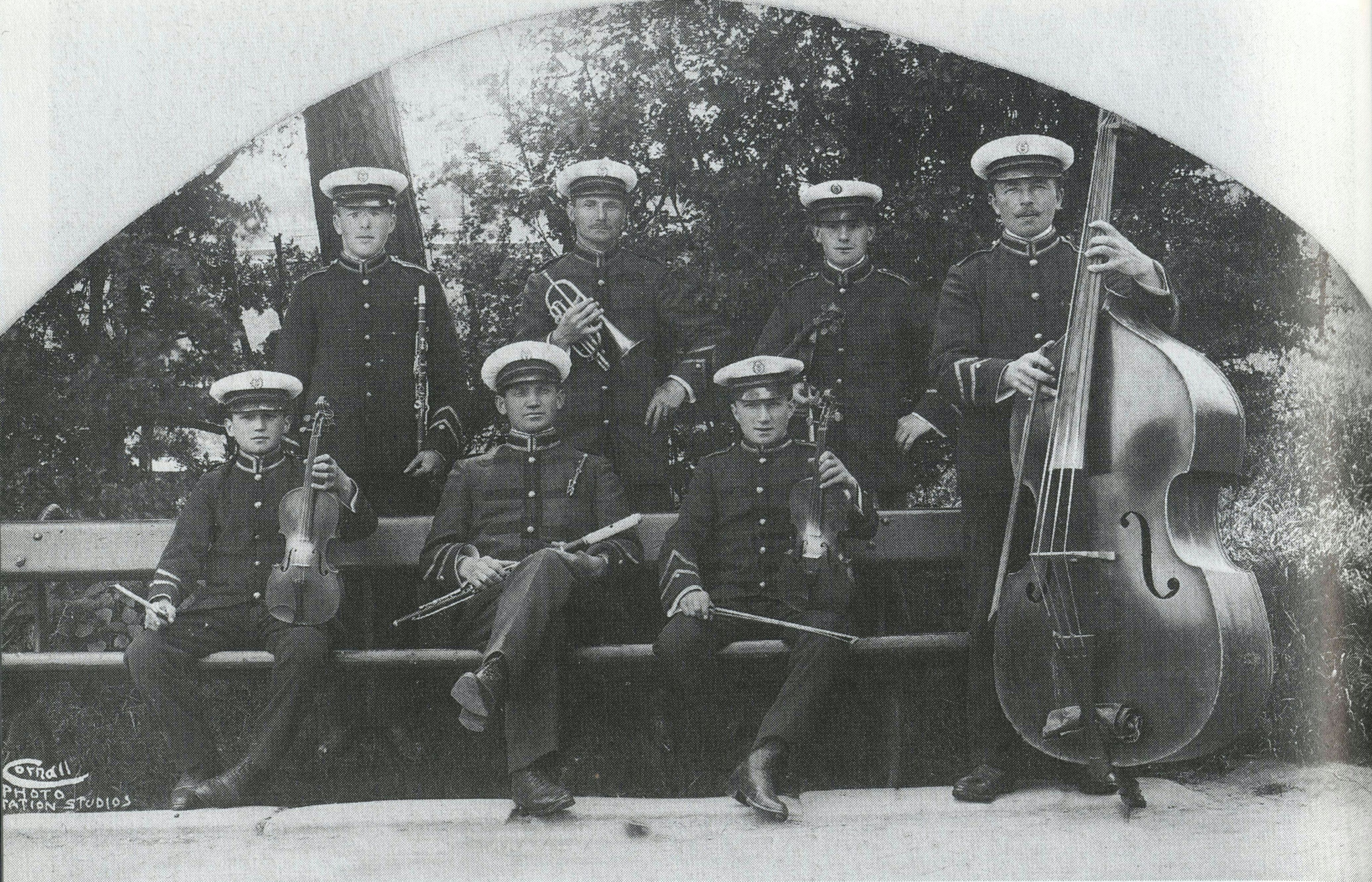
The Bavarian String Band at Harrogate, 1908

At twenty years old in 1897, Schwarz came back to England, performing in Whitby, Saltburn and Morecambe with his own seven-man band, the Bavarian String Band, which included his brother Gustav, four of his other relatives, and Ludwig Bollenbacher on double bass. He appeared in Harrogate, North Riding of Yorkshire, in 1902 as a "fresh musical phenomenon", and brought Amalia with him. Visitor numbers had increased at that time, and there were at least four council-owned bandstands available to those with official permission. He must have got permission, because the Harrogate Herald said, "I must say that the little German String Band which has so long been in residence in Harrogate plays exceedingly well a tasteful repertoire". He was also performing in hotels for rich guests, and outdoors at Bog's Field (now Valley Gardens), next to the Grand Opera house, and at Pierhead, Harrogate. In the 19th and early 20th century, money was collected from audiences at outside venues by bottling – walking around the audience during performances with a collecting-bottle or other receptacle. Schwarz performed from 1897 to 1914 in Harrogate, returning there from Germany during most summers. He rented many different terrace houses in the town for the band, for example in Bedford Row, Belmont Avenue, Valley Road, Strawberry Dale, Duchy Avenue and Valley Mount.

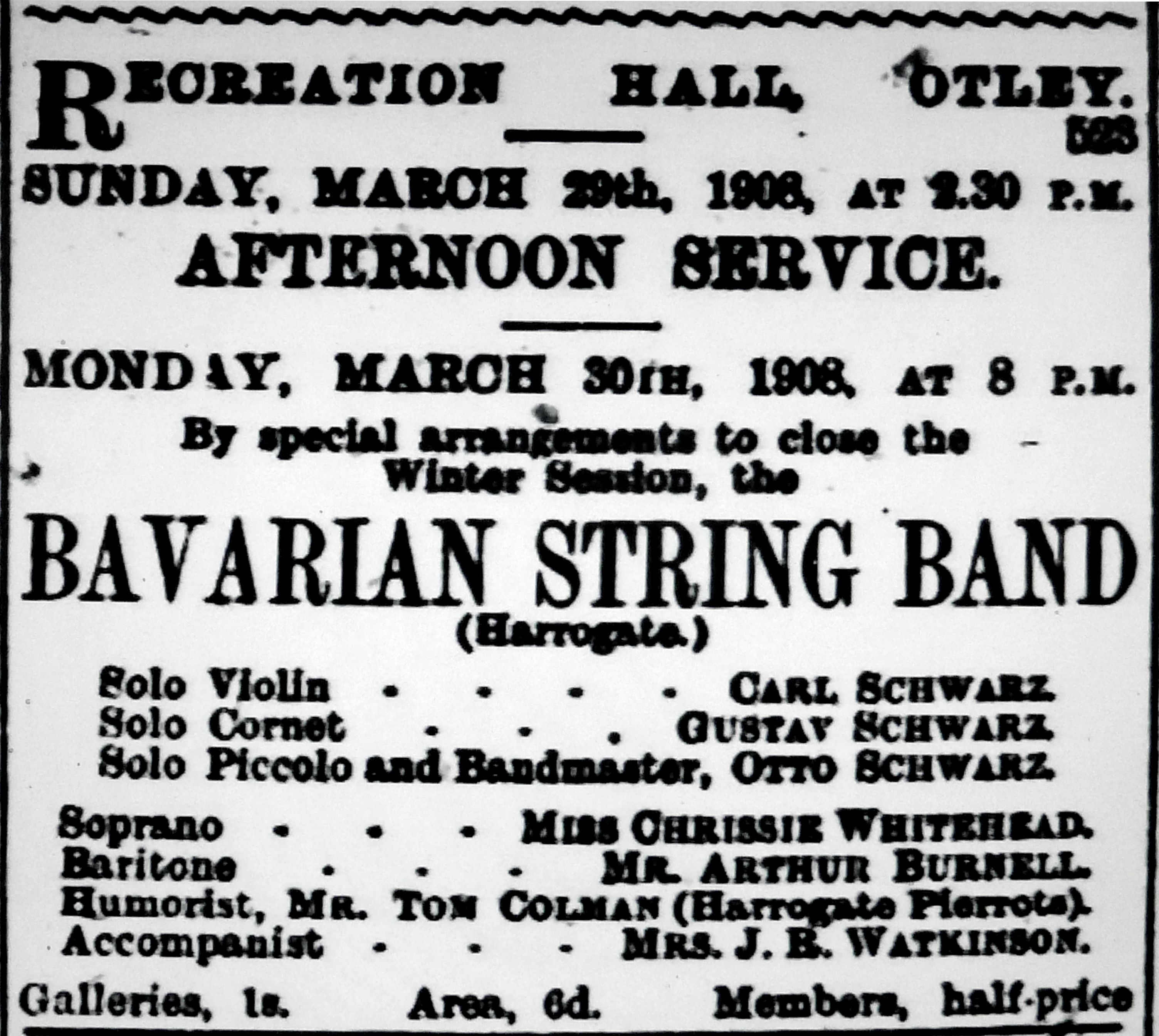
Advert for Schwarz's Otley performance, 1908

It was normal practice for bands such as Schwarz's to be resident all summer in one town, but to take extra bookings in nearby locations. On 16 August 1904. Schwarz and his band provided the music for the annual dinner of the United Billposters' Association, at the Crown Hotel, Harrogate. On 23 June 1906 at the Wells House Hotel and Winter Gardens, Ilkley, Schwarz and his band were one of several playing at the hotel's 50th anniversary celebrations. In 1907 the band – described as the "Blue Bavarian Band" – performed "A brief, though artistically-rendered programme" at the Queen's Hall, Otley. They were on their way to Blackpool, where Schwarz's father used to perform. On 30 March 1908, the Bavarian String Band performed at the Queen's Hall, Otley: the march from Tannhäuser, a Suppé overture, a Strauss waltz, The Gondoliers, Troop March by Lutz, and a fantasia from Lohengrin. Monday 28 March 1910 was a day of "glorious weather", in which bands and other entertainments played across Harrogate, to attract visitors at the spa. Those on Prospect Hill in daytime, and at the Kursaal in the evening, were "regaled by Otto Schwarz's Bavarian Band". On 28 July 1904 and 3 August 1912, Schwarz and his band provided the music at the annual sports day of Clifton College, Harrogate, on Harrogate Cricket Ground, in front of a "large and fashionable assemblage of spectators".

=== Charity performances ===
Schwarz was a philanthropist on a modest scale, in that he gave charity concerts for the benefit of poorer performers such as the Harrogate Glee Singers, and hospitals such as Harrogate Infirmary. At Hoad Hill, Ulverston, on 2 April 1905, Schwarz and his band gave a performance for "a large crowd". The programme included items from his father Daniel's repertoire: the march from Tannhäuser, and Messiah. The other items were selections from Lohengrin, the William Tell overture, Queen of Angels cornet solo, (Note: Queen of Angels (1897) was written by M. Piccolini, the pseudonym of Dublin-born Henry Theodore Pontet (1833–1902). See Lucerna Magic Lantern Web Resource, lucerna.exeter.ac.uk, item 6001505) the overture from Zampa, and selections from Cavalleria Rusticana, Half of the band's collection was donated to Ulverston Cottage Hospital. This effort was repeated on 7 May 1905, when the Bavarian Band played another set on Hoad Hill for the same cause. "A substantial sum was realised". In 1907, Schwarz donated 8s 5d, (equivalent to £4,368.37 in 2025) half his band's takings at Blackpool on 3 March, to Driffield Cottage Hospital. His band was playing as (or perhaps with) the Blackpool Band on that occasion.

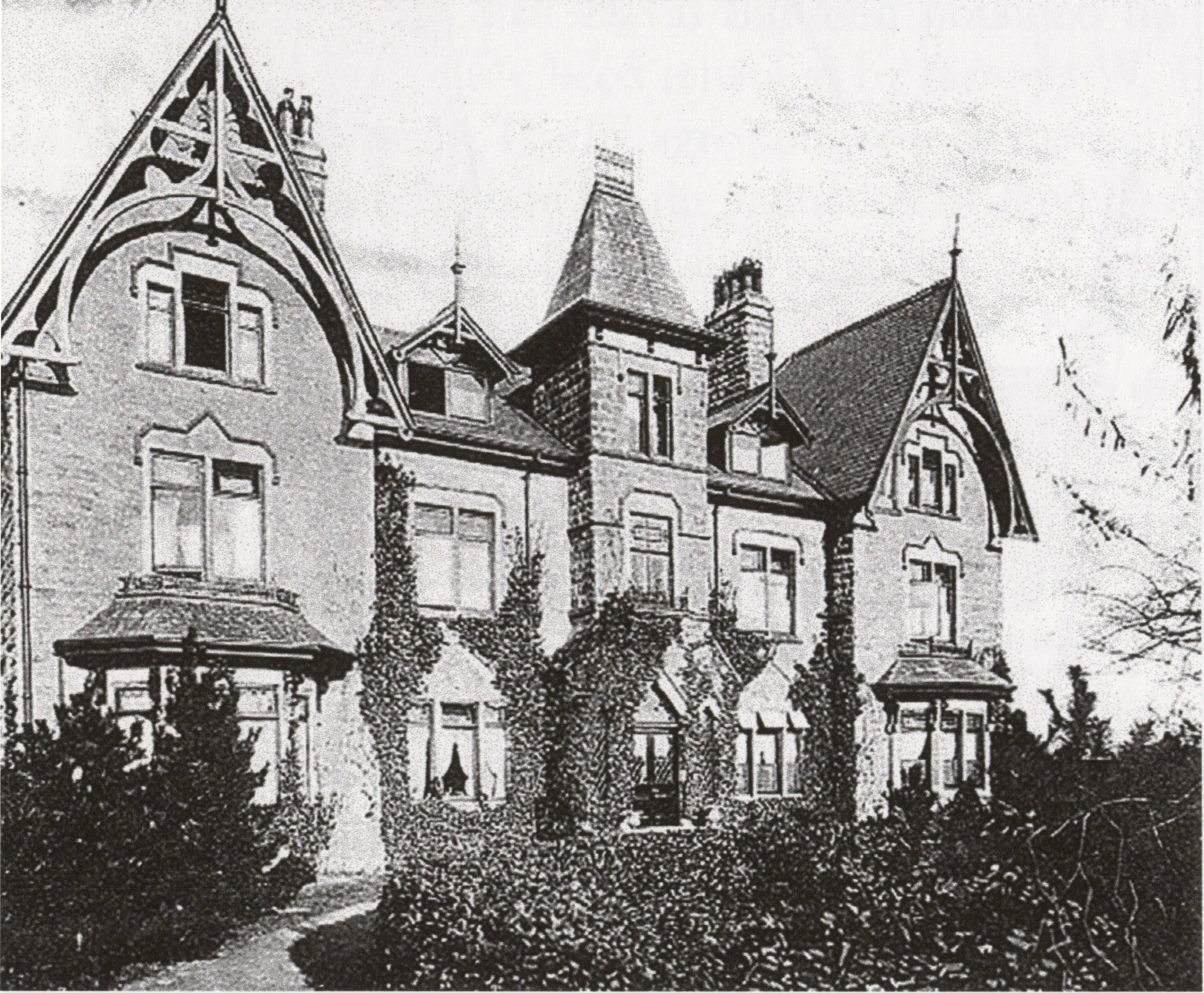
Waldernheath, where Schwarz performed in 1912

After a musician and friend of Schwarz – Wallace Henry Hartley – was drowned on the Titanic in 1912 while performing as its bandleader, Schwarz gave a benefit concert with carefully-chosen pieces, including the overture or march (reports vary) from Tannhäuser (about a travelling poet or musician), on 1 May, in memory of those lost in the disaster. It also featured baritone and tenor duets from 'Watchman, what of the Night and Excelsior, (Note: Watchman, What of the Night by Frederick Arthur Challinor, and Excelsior by Michael William Balfe (separate recordings), can be heard on YouTube's Andre Previn-topic channel) Old Kentucky Home, a cornet solo, and the overture from Poet and Peasant. The weather was bad, but they still had "a good audience". The concert brought £4 (equivalent to £395.02 in 2025), which Schwarz "handed over to the Lord Mayor of London". In July 1912, Schwarz and his band supported efforts to raise money for the Missions to Seamen at the school in the Waldernheath villa in Cornwall Road, Harrogate, by entertaining the paying visitors.

=== Winter work ===
For Schwarz, at home, there was work to be done on the farmland, but the musicians had extra work. On return to Germany for the winter, Schwarz would divide the summer's profits with the band, who had been paid basic wages during the tour. He would then prepare the band for the next season, purchasing new music sheets, practising with the band, and teaching apprentices.

== First World War ==
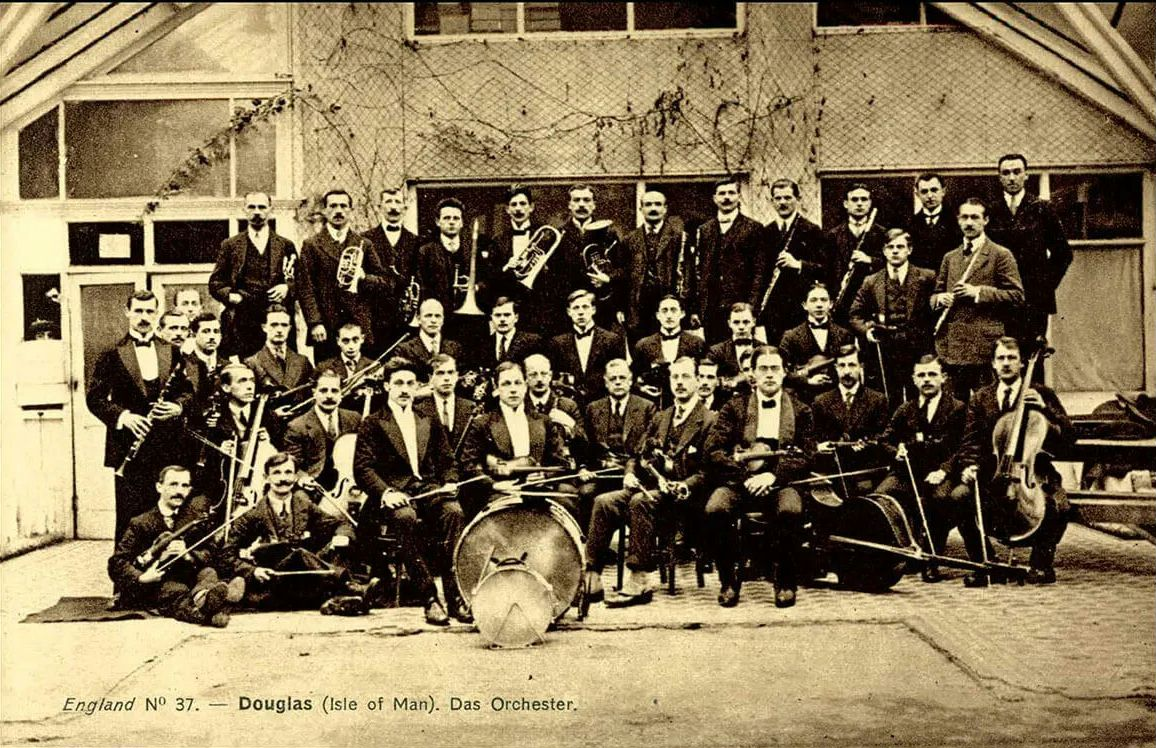
First World War prisoner of war orchestra, Isle of Man. The flautist on the far right is possibly Schwarz.

Schwarz continued to perform in Harrogate up to 4 August 1914 when the First World War was announced. On 5 August, Schwarz and his band walked to Harrogate Police station with luggage and instruments, and queued, as per government requirement, to be interned as enemy aliens. They were imprisoned, then transported to the Isle of Man, where there were two camps for internees, and the camp at Douglas had a prisoner of war orchestra. Historian Malcolm Neesam says, "Until the international calamity of 1914, Otto Schwarz and his band provided the town with musical entertainment at a very professional level, although their status as street entertainers meant that they seldom received the formal acknowledgement that their talents deserved". The Yorkshire Evening Post of 15 August 1914 elaborates further, with a slightly different story:

The war has robbed Harrogate of one of the features of its daily life – its German band! For sixteen years now Mr Otto Schwarz and his brother Gustav have led a little company of musicians whose presence in the town has become as familiar to the residents and the visitors as The Stray itself. Now they are silent for the first time in that long period, and they have not blown a note since the day Germany declared the war in Russia. There is a pathetic ring about their story, (Note: In England in the early 20th century, the word, "pathetic", had associations with sympathy, and did not have the derogatory meaning that it assumed later.) and it seems to have touched the hearts of many Harrogate people, who greatly respect the Schwarz brothers, for it should be borne in mind that the little company is not quite the type of ordinary peripatetic German bands one comes across. They pride themselves upon being really good musicians, and they secure quite a number of private engagements from shows, school parties, dances and so on. This summer there were six in the band, and of the four besides the Schwarz brothers, one is a young married man, and the other three youths in their teens. Not one of them has served as a soldier in the German army, but as soon as the announcement came that Germany was at war the four younger musicians deemed it their duty to go to London and report themselves to the German consul. That put a sudden end to the band's performances. The services of the four patriotic young Germans were not required however. It was no good returning to Harrogate as there were obvious objections to a German band appearing in the streets. One did return a day or two later, and the other three have been staying in London in the hope of coming across some other means of earning their livelihood. But apparently no English employer cares to take on Germans just now., and so the trio have decided to return to Harrogate, where they are expected today. Mr Gustav Schwarz has no two opinions about this war. "The Kaiser is mad", he declared to one of our representatives today. "Whatever possessed him to do as he has done goodness only knows. The rank and file in Germany no more wanted to go to war with England than the people here wanted to go to war with Germany".

== Compositions ==
- The Waves Roar (after 1902), a piece inspired by Schwarz's crossing of the English Channel in 1902.

== Death and legacy ==
Schwarz died aged 85 in Hinzweiler in 1961. In 2011, Schwarz's grandson Daniel K. Schwarz published a biography of Otto Schwarz in English, the title of which incorporated the name of his composition, The Waves Roar.

The archives of Otto Schwarz are kept in the Westpfälzer Musikantenmuseum Mackenbach, and in the Musikantenland Museum, in Lichtenberg Castle near Kusel, Germany.
