= Musikantenland Museum =

Coordinates: 49°33′20.37″N 7°21′20.92″E

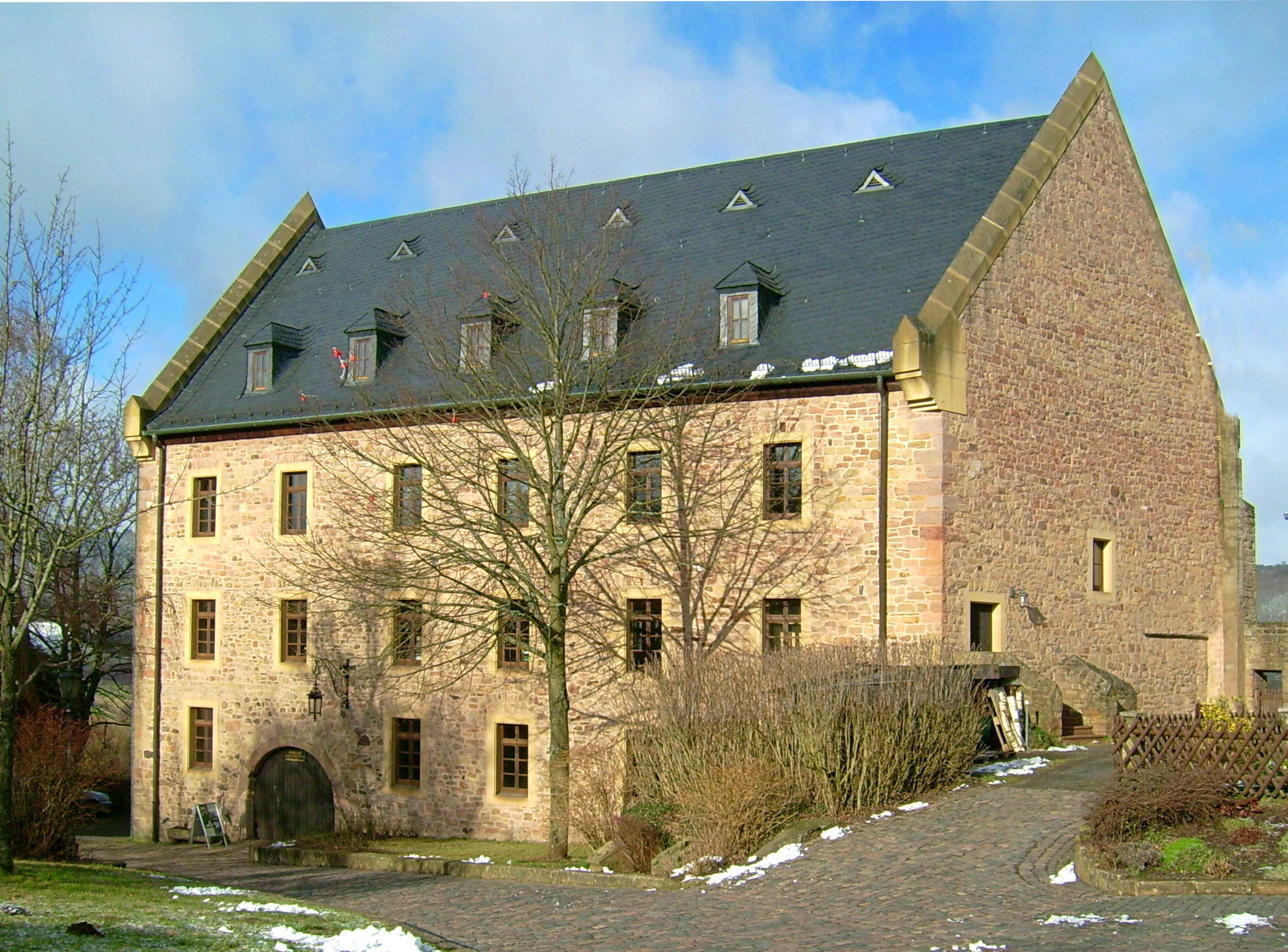
Tithe barn and location of the Palatine Musikantenland Museum at Lichtenberg Castle (Palatinate)

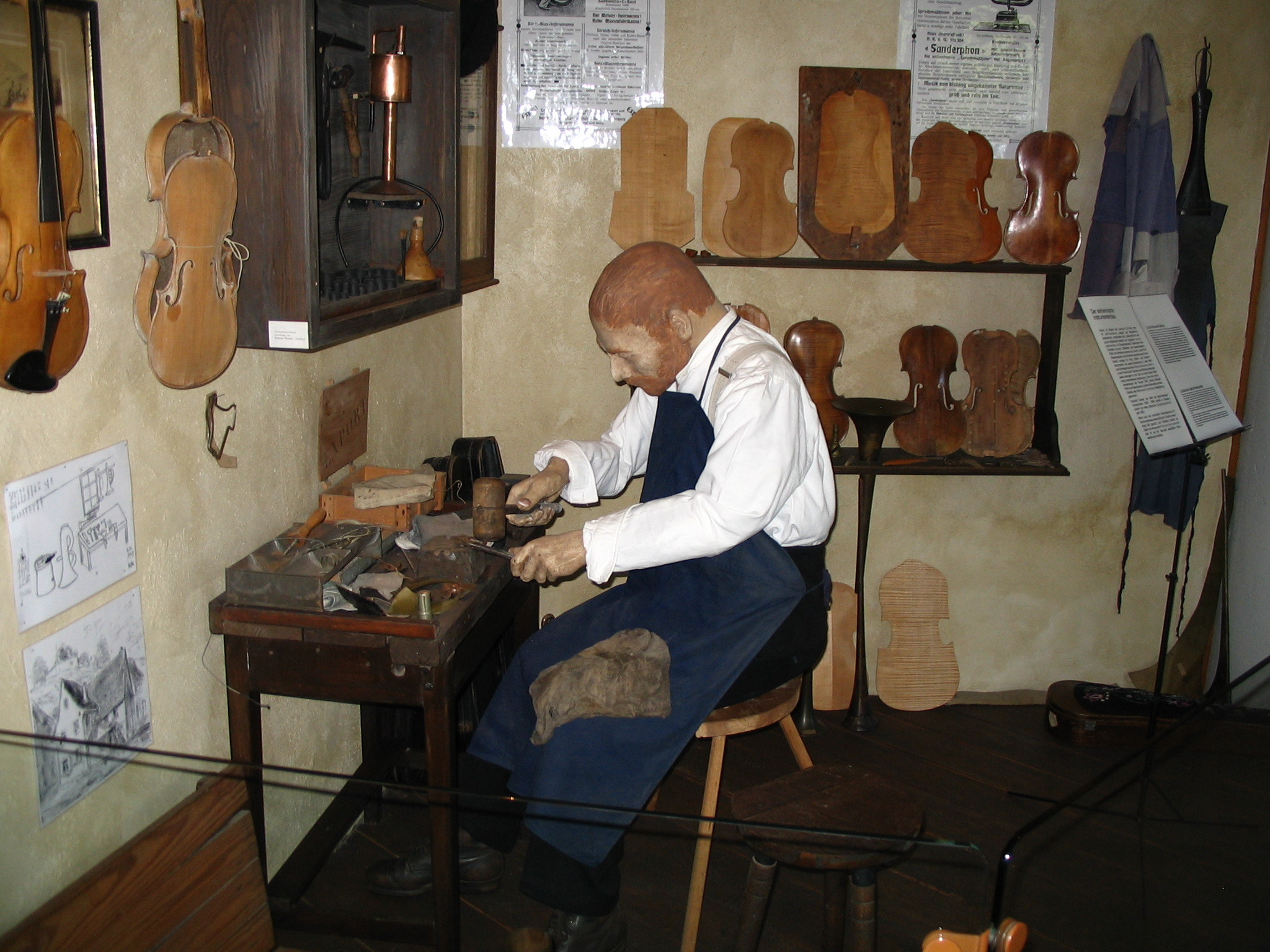
Instrument maker in his workshop

The Palatine Musikantenland Museum (German: Pfälzer Musikantenland-Museum) at Lichtenberg Castle near Thallichtenberg in the county of Kusel documents the history of the West Palatine wandering musicians, whose heyday was between 1850 and the First World War.

The museum exhibits inter alia historical sheet music, photographs of the bands and musicians as well as travel souvenirs from foreign countries. In addition, to an extensive collection of musical instruments that once travelled the whole world with the wandering musicians, the work of the instrument makers, at that time a flourishing branch of craftsmanship, is also documented. Several groups of figures show the life of the musicians and their families. The exhibits come from the estates of the musicians. Visitors can listen to music recordings of the works of the wandering musicians. The museum also has a historical picture archive, a literature archive and an archive of handwritten sheet music, which can be used for research purposes on request.

The Palatine Musikantenland Museum opened in 1984 in the tithe barn of Lichtenberg Castle (Palatinate) in the Musikantenland ("Musicians' Land"). It was initiated by Kusel-based music teacher and regional historian, Paul Engel, the long-time director of the Kusel Music Society (Westphalian Symphony Orchestra) and winner of the Musikantenland Prize. Paul Engel, himself a descendant of a family of wandering musicians, meticulously researches the theme and cultivates the memory of the regional musical tradition with his works.

In 2025, a redesign of the museum is underway.

== See also ==
- List of music museums
