= Musikantenland =

Region of the Western Palatinate, Germany

The Musikantenland ("Musician's Land") is an area of the northern West Palatinate in Germany, north of the Landstuhler Bruch in the area of the rivers Glan and Lauter. On the fringes of this region are the city of Kaiserslautern and the towns of Kusel, Rockenhausen and Meisenheim (only Kusel being counted as part of the Musikantenland). The region is located in the counties of Kusel and Kaiserslautern. This region is named after the Westphalian Wandering Musicians, who originated from here, especially from 1850 until the First World War.

== Usage ==
Today, the term "Musikantenland" is often used in this area for tourism purposes. For example the county of Kusel operates its tourist industry under the slogan "Palatine Uplands - Kusel Musikantenland". Regional dishes are described with the prefix "Musikantenland", there is for example a Musikantenland Roast and Musikantenland Bratwurst.

The Musikantenland Museum in Lichtenberg Castle near Kusel and the West Palatine Musikanten Museum in Mackenbach recall the history of West Palatinate's wandering musicians.

Since 1984, the county of Kusel has awarded the Lichtenburg Musikantenland Prize in recognition of special achievements for those cultivating and developing the West Palatinate musical tradition. Elmar Wolf, also a Lichtenburg Prize winner, founded the publishing house EDITION Musikantenland, after leaving the EWOTON-Musikverlag music publishing company, as a token of his affection for the Kusel Musikantenland.

In 2003, the County school of Music, founded in 1948, was renamed the Kusel Music School Musikantenland.

Buildings such as the Musikantenland Hall, a multi-purpose hall in Jettenbach, also bear the name.
