= West Palatine travelling music tradition =

Travelling musicians in Germany

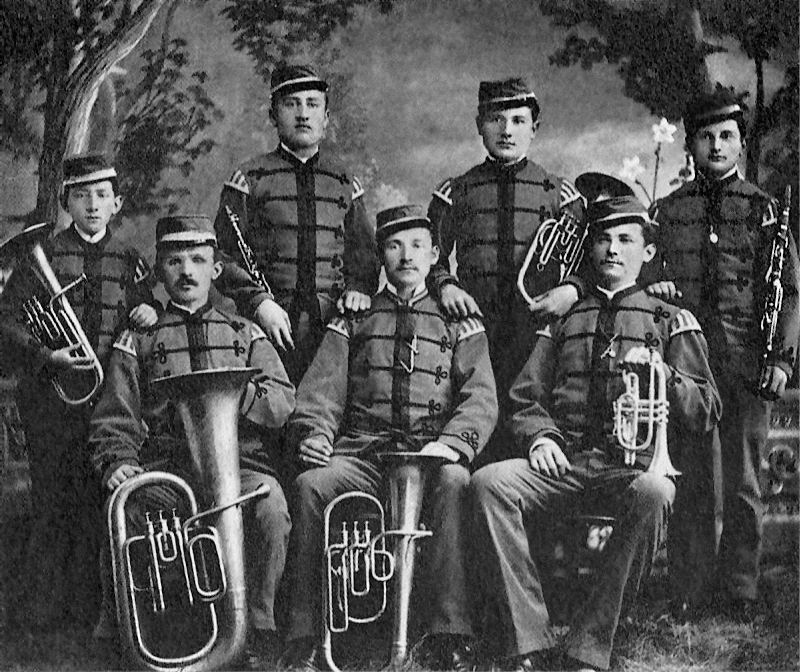
Carl Weber's band during its North American trip in 1882/83

The West Palatine travelling music tradition (German: Westpfälzer Wandermusikantentum) were part of a tradition established by travelling musicians from a region of West Palatinate in Germany that is now called Musikantenland ("Musicians' Land"). The tradition started around 1830 and had its heyday between 1850 and the First World War. During this time, several thousand musicians travelled through the world and a livelihood for themselves and their families.

== History ==
=== Origin ===
The West Palatinate has always been one of the poorest agricultural regions of Germany. In the 19th century, transport links to industrial centres did not exist and harvests, such as those of 1816/17 or 1831, were poor, regularly resulting in famine. The region was also badly impacted by the decline in mining on the Königsberg and Potzberg. For many families, the way out of this misery was either to emigrate or to work as migrant workers in the better-off regions of Europe. The economic boom in France during the reign of Napoleon, for example, attracted many Germans to southern France, where they found work in the ports. At the same time, migrant trades developed in various professions that sold home-made products abroad, such as brushes and brooms from Ramberg or shoes from the Pirmasens area.

The reasons why the inhabitants of the region that later became the Musikantenland between Kusel, Kaiserslautern, Rockenhausen and Meisenheim devoted themselves to the presentation of music are not exactly known. It is assumed that the significance of Electoral court in Mannheim as the music centre of Europe in the 18th century played an important role in this development. Miners who had been recruited from Saxony, Thuringia or the Alsace to extract the mineral resources at Königsberg and Potzberg and who played the folk music of their homeland in their free time, are also said to have contributed to the musicality of the inhabitants of the Musikantenland. The names of the first musicians to travel around, and who could thus be regarded as role models, are unknown, nor is it known when the first journeys were undertaken. The code civil introduced during the French period, which among other things brought commercial freedom, led to the fact that, from 1800 onwards, the secondary job title of "musician" is to be found more and more often.

In the early days, the first musicians played at church festivals or other festivals in the surrounding area or in neighbouring countries. Since it was economically worthwhile, more and more bands formed around 1830, so that the travelling area had to be extended as well. In the beginning, they travelled mainly to areas where many Germans lived as emigrants or migrant workers, and came as far as southern France or Spain.

The number of passports issued for international travel increased from year to year. The Bavarian state government – the Palatinate had been part of the Kingdom of Bavaria since Congress of Vienna – became aware of the growing number of musicians. However, since it was alleviating the economic hardship in the West Palatinate, it was decided not to take action against it. Only school-age children, who accompanied their fathers or relatives more and more often, were banned from travelling.

The "largest" musician villages
Location	Number of musicians
Jettenbach	532
Mackenbach	427
Eßweiler	284
Wolfstein	227
Rothselberg	226

==== Heyday ====
From 1850, it was increasingly trained musicians who played in the bands. The bands now travelled all over Europe and also went overseas – Asia, Australia, Africa and above all America were worthwhile destinations. Everywhere, they were known as "Mackenbachers", even if they came from other places. Mackenbach was, however, a typical musicians' village; at times a quarter of the population was musically active. The number of musicians and bands grew steadily. In 1909 alone, 1,043 wandering musicians were identified from county of Kusel on the basis of passport applications. At that time it was possible to travel to some countries without a passport – in England only 100 gold marks and a valid employment contract needed to be shown – it is assumed that at the turn of the century around 2,500 musicians were on tour every year.

Over time, the musicians became more professional and the standard of training improved. In English seaside resorts, wealthy citizens spent the summer months. The West Palatine musicians were welcome there, as long as they adapted to the increased demands of the audience. In order to be engaged by the baths and spas, their usual street clothes had to be exchanged for uniforms and contemporary pieces of music by well-known composers had to be included in the repertoire. To communicate with employers and officials, at least the conductor had to speak foreign languages. Hubertus Kilian, for example, spoke English and French and understood Italian and Spanish. There were also bands that travelled on foot from place to place through the emigrant regions and played in town squares, but the proceeds from street performances alone were lower. Those who were unable to converse in foreign languages and only had Palatine folk music in their programme could not hope for permanent employment. Another, crisis-proof sector was the circus, which even offered work for some musicians after the First World War. In the 19th century, large circus companies developed, which sometimes had several bands. There was a great demand for musicians and many Palatines, especially from Mackenbach, found well paid jobs at Hagenbeck, Sarrasani or Busch.

In the hometowns, instrument-making developed as a flourishing industry, as did the businesses of the cloth makers, dyers and tailors. Music brought prosperity to the once impoverished region, and many musicians returned as wealthy men, sometimes after years of absence.

=== Decline ===
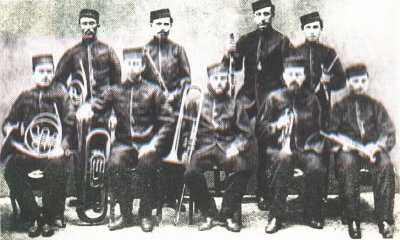
The band of Hubertus Kilian in China (1863/64)

The start of the First World War marked the beginning of the end for touring music bands that had just reached its absolute climax. Many men had to go to war, most of the job opportunities for musicians were eliminated and Germany's borders were blocked. Musicians who were caught out by the start of the war during a trip abroad were prevented from returning home. Rudolf Mersy from Aschbach was interned until 1920 in camps in Australia and New Zealand, Otto Schwarz from Hinzweiler and his band, who had previously lived in England for several years, were incarcerated on the Isle of Man.

After the war, Germans were initially banned from entering almost all countries, with the exception of the Netherlands. After the hardship of the post-war period was over and cultural life flourished again, the travelling musicians faced increasing competition from with records, radio and film; the trade was never able to return to its heyday. At best, as a circus musician some touring musicians were able to continue their profession for a while. Some musicians stayed abroad, especially in the US, and continued to make music there. Bill Henry, originally Heinrich Jakob from Mackenbach, hired a young singer, Frank Sinatra, for his band in 1932.

In 1935, the remaining full-time wandering musicians of the Palatinate were admitted to the Reichsmusikkammer ("State Music Institute"). A prerequisite for a professional travelling outfit was that the band had to consist of at least seven members. They had to pass examinations and needed a responsible director, who was issued with a group pass by the State Director of the Saar-Palatinate division of the Reichsmusikkammer. In 1938, musical auditions were conducted in Mackenbach and Lauterecken, where a total of 30 bands were examined. With effect from 1 April 1939, the act on the membership of wandering musicians was repealed by the Reichsmusikkammer as their activities were "not considered to be promoting musical culture". With that, the era of travelling musicians from the West Palatinate came to an end.

== Musicians ==
=== Training ===
The repertoire of the bands required the individual musician to be able to play several instruments; as a rule, one had to master not only a wind instrument but also a string instrument. There were no music schools in the Palatinate, but Jettenbach pastor, Schowalter, tried in vain before the First World War to form one politically. A musical apprenticeship was similar to that of a craftsman: the apprentice was taught for several years by a master, an experienced touring musician. The best known teachers were Ludwig Christmann from Kaulbach, Jakob and August Rech from Etschberg and Ludwig Jakob from Mackenbach, who was also called "Gorlhauser Lui" because he grew up in Godelhausen.

Training began while a boy was still at school, the pupil had to attend music lessons several times a week. The first journey for the young musicians – called "Easter boys" because they had just been released from school at Easter – often took place with their father or a close relative. This prevented homesickness, but also prevented young people from falling into the hands of unscrupulous bandmasters who only exploited them.

With the first trip, the actual training period of the musicians began. For two to three years, the young musicians were usually only allowed to play accompanying roles, which they called abstoßen ("detached") or abknuppen. The leader would decide whether someone was talented enough to become a soloist or whether he had to remain in the background as an accompanying musician. Many musicians gave up quickly when they found a more suitable place to work, and only went on a few trips. The most talented musicians took further lessons with good teachers of their instrument, often abroad, at every opportunity.

A further training opportunity offered itself during the military era. A regimental musician was not only able to improve the mastery of his instrument, but also gained an insight into a wider range of music and the possibilities for its arrangement. This proved useful for the later time as a touring musician in selecting and interpreting the pieces. Hubertus Kilian from Eßweiler, for example, received such training when he did his military service in 1852 with an infantry battalion in Kaiserslautern.

=== Bands ===
The bands (Kapellen or Banden), were put together by the bandmaster, an experienced wandering musician, relatives were often preferred. On longer journeys, several conductors would sometimes join their bands together. Most of the bands consisted of five to ten musicians, but they could also have 20 or more members. The musicians were employees of the bandleader and received their wages after the trip from him, which were determined depending on their skills, their experience and the income of the band. The instrumentation was mostly mixed, pure wind or string groups were less common. The conductor had to make sure that even more demanding pieces could be included in the repertoire in order to get better paid engagements. Easily transportable, more robust instruments were preferred. The discipline of the musicians was important, later on the external appearance and the appearance of the musicians was also emphasized.

=== Notable musicians ===
- Daniel Schwarz (1851–1885), who led the Schwarz Band, which performed in Blackpool, Pateley Bridge and Harrogate, England.
- Otto Schwarz (1876–1981), who led the Bavarian String Band, which performed in Harrogate and other venues in England.

== Literature ==
- Marliese Fuhrmann: Kuckucksruf und Nachtigall. Die Pfälzer Wandermusikanten. Gollenstein, Blieskastel, 2000, ISBN 3-933389-27-5.
- Paul P. J. Engel: Pfälzer Musikantenland-Museum auf Burg Lichtenberg. (= Landkreis Kusel. Nr. 1). Görres-Verlag, Koblenz, 2001, ISBN 3-920388-99-2.
- Kurt Neufert: Rudi Rosenthal – Ein Musikant zieht durch die Welt. Verlag Pfälzer Kunst, Landau, 1986, DNB-IDN 871247135.
