= Daniel Schwarz (bandleader) =

German trumpeter (1851–1885)

- Born: 3 July 1851; Hinzweiler, Kingdom of Bavaria, German Confederation
- Died: 7 March 1885 (aged 33); Harrogate, North Riding of Yorkshire, England, United Kingdom
- Genres: 19th-century Bavarian band music
- Occupation: Band leader of the Schwarz Band
- Instrument: Trumpet
- Years active: 1860–1885

Daniel Schwarz (3 July 1851 – 7 March 1885) was a German trumpeter, and the band leader of the travelling Schwarz Band from Hinzweiler, Germany. His home town had a strong musical culture, so although he was a smallholder in Germany, in the summers he would work in the manner of the West Palatine Wandermusikanten, who would travel as musical entertainers throughout Europe in the 19th and early 20th centuries. Schwarz's venues in England were the Raikes Hall Gardens at Blackpool where he was bandmaster and also in the Oddfellows' Hall, Pateley Bridge and in Harrogate, North Riding of Yorkshire.

The Schwarz Band was a section of a larger band belonging to his brother-in-law Jacob Hoffmann. Schwarz was the father of Otto Schwarz, who continued in his father's footsteps, bringing his Bavarian String Band to Harrogate until 1914. Schwarz died suddenly at the age of 33 and is buried in Grove Road Cemetery, Harrogate.

== Background ==
Schwarz's parents were Daniel Schwarz (1820–1900) and Margaretha Volles (1820–1877) of Germany. Daniel Schwarz was born on 3 July 1851 in Hinzweiler, Germany, which at that period was within the Bavarian border. On 21 December 1875 he married Katharina Zink in Bavaria. He was the father of Otto Schwarz who later brought the Bavarian String Band to play in Harrogate bandstands between 1897 and 1914.

== Career ==
In Schwarz's home town of Hinzweiler, the music club "played a strong and central role in public life". In the 19th and early 20th centuries, the itinerant bandsmen or Wandermusikanten from the Upper Palatinate area of Bavaria were "famous in Europe". Schwarz took advantage of that, and newspapers tended to describe his band as Bavarian. In Hinzweiler, where "he was highly respected", Schwarz was a "small landowner" in winter, and a travelling band leader and trumpeter in summer. He first landed in England around 1860 at the age of about nine years, as a visiting musician. From around 1879 until 1885, he was the leader of the Schwarz Band, otherwise known as the Jacob Hoffmann Band, because it was a section of a larger band run by his brother-in-law Jacob Hoffmann. From its inception until Schwarz's death his band, which included mixed instruments and vocalists, played primarily at the Raikes Hall Gardens at Blackpool where he was bandmaster, and also in the Oddfellows' Hall, Pateley Bridge and in Harrogate, North Riding of Yorkshire.

=== Examples of performances ===
During the Whit Week holiday of 1883, Schwarz and his band played alongside other acts at Uncle Tom's Cabin on the cliffs at a little distance from Blackpool. On 16 May 1884, he led the band at Pateley Bridge with the following performance:of "operatic and other music": the overture of Titus, a selection from The Pirates of Penzance, The Heavens are Telling a pot pourri from the Zauberlaterne, a selection from Patience, Fantasia and Lohengrin, cornet solo, Snowdrop Polka, Valse, Marien, a selection from Norma, another waltz, Am Schönen Rhein Gedenk ich Dien, Fantasia, Chia an Rosanto St Domingo, a selection from Faust, Pastorale and Messiah, and finally God Save the Queen.

== Death and legacy ==
Schwarz died unexpectedly at Harrogate railway station while waiting for the Otley train, on 7 March 1885, aged 33 years. He was visiting the area with his band. (Note: GRO Index: Deaths Mar 1885 Schwarz Daniel. 34 Knaresbro' 9a 85) His body lay in his lodgings at Tower Street, Harrogate, until he was buried at Grove Road Cemetery in a public grave on 9 March 1885. (Note: A public grave is a pauper's grave, i.e. Schwarz's burial was paid for by Harrogate Corporation. He was interred in plot E2491, Grove Road Cemetery, with other people, so he has no headstone. His grave is near the headstone of Walker Harker.)

After Schwarz died, the Schwarz Band became the Royal Palace Guards Band, which continued to play at Pateley Bridge and Blackpool.
