= Lichtenberg Castle (Palatinate) =

Coordinates: 49°33′20″N 7°21′20″E

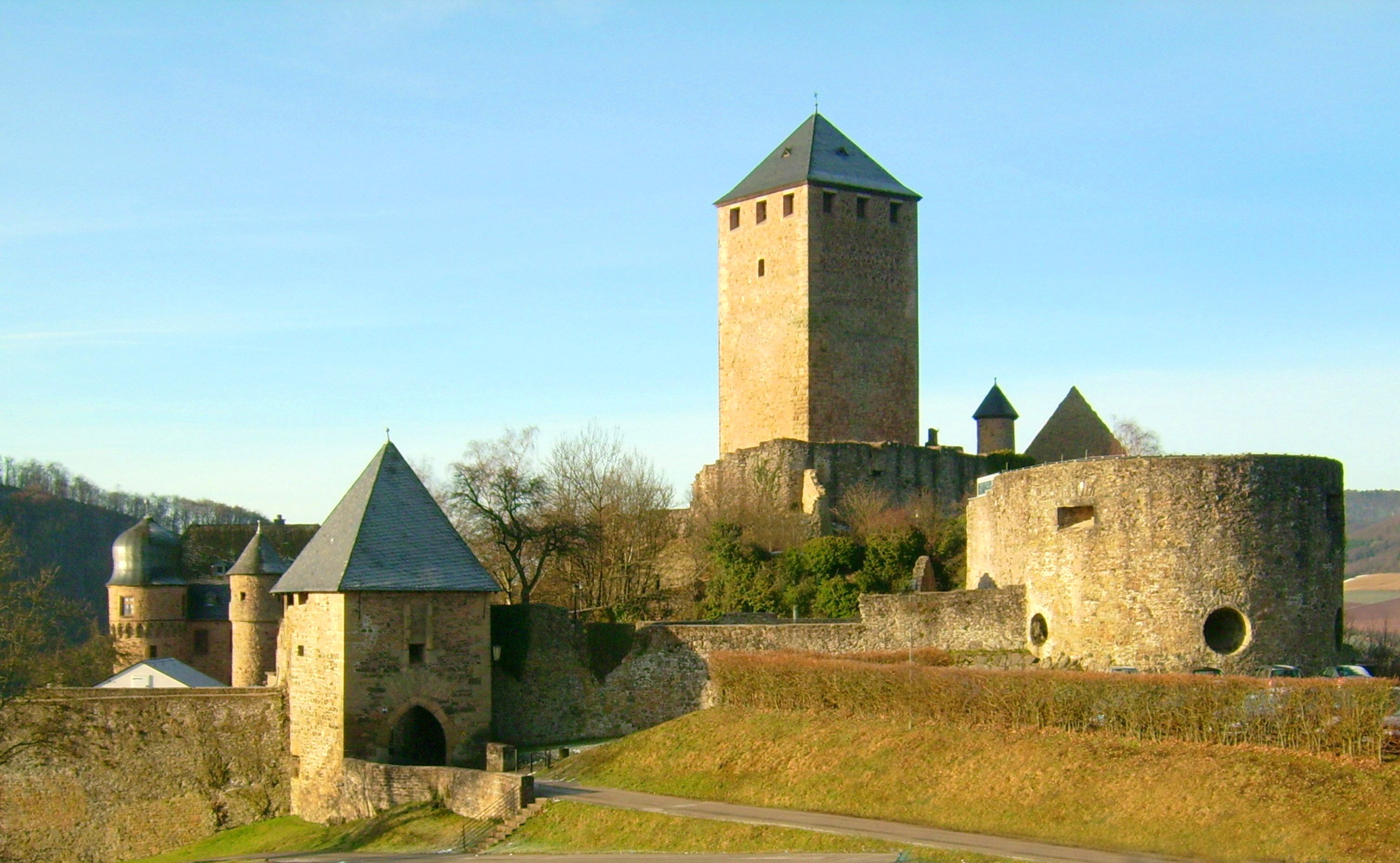

Site information
- Type: Spur castle

Site history
- Built: around 1200

Lichtenberg Castle (German: Burg Lichtenberg) is a ruin of the spur castle type; with a length of 425m (1,394 ft) it is the biggest castle ruin in Germany. It is located near Thallichtenberg in the district of Kusel in Rhineland-Palatinate.

== History ==
The castle was built around 1200 and was owned until 1444 by the counts of Veldenz; after which it fell into the ownership of Stephen, Count Palatine of Simmern-Zweibrücken. Under the new rule, Lichtenberg Castle became the administrative seat of Zweibrücken until the move of the administration to Kusel in 1758. The castle remained under the duchy until the dissolution of the Duchy of Zweibrücken in 1792.

The part of Germany west of the Rhine river was occupied by French Revolution troops in 1792, and in 1795, the French dissolved the old borders and created new administrative districts, placing Lichtenberg Castle in the Saar Department. The town of Kusel was burnt down by French revolution troops in 1794. Lichtenberg Castle was plundered numerous times during the ensuing chaos that came with the French occupation, and in 1799, a fire caused by the castle's inhabitants destroyed much of the castle.

With the defeat of French Emperor Napoleon Bonaparte and the subsequent withdrawal of French troops from Germany, in 1816 the area west of the Rhine was given to the Duke of Saxony-Coburg-Gotha and became the Princedom of Lichtenberg. However, this rule was short-lived, and in 1834 the princedom was sold to Prussia. Lichtenberg Castle fell into disrepair and ruin until, in 1895, the whole castle complex was placed under historical monument protection. In 1945 the district of Birkenfeld, in which Lichtenberg Castle lay, became a part of the new state of Rhineland-Palatinate.

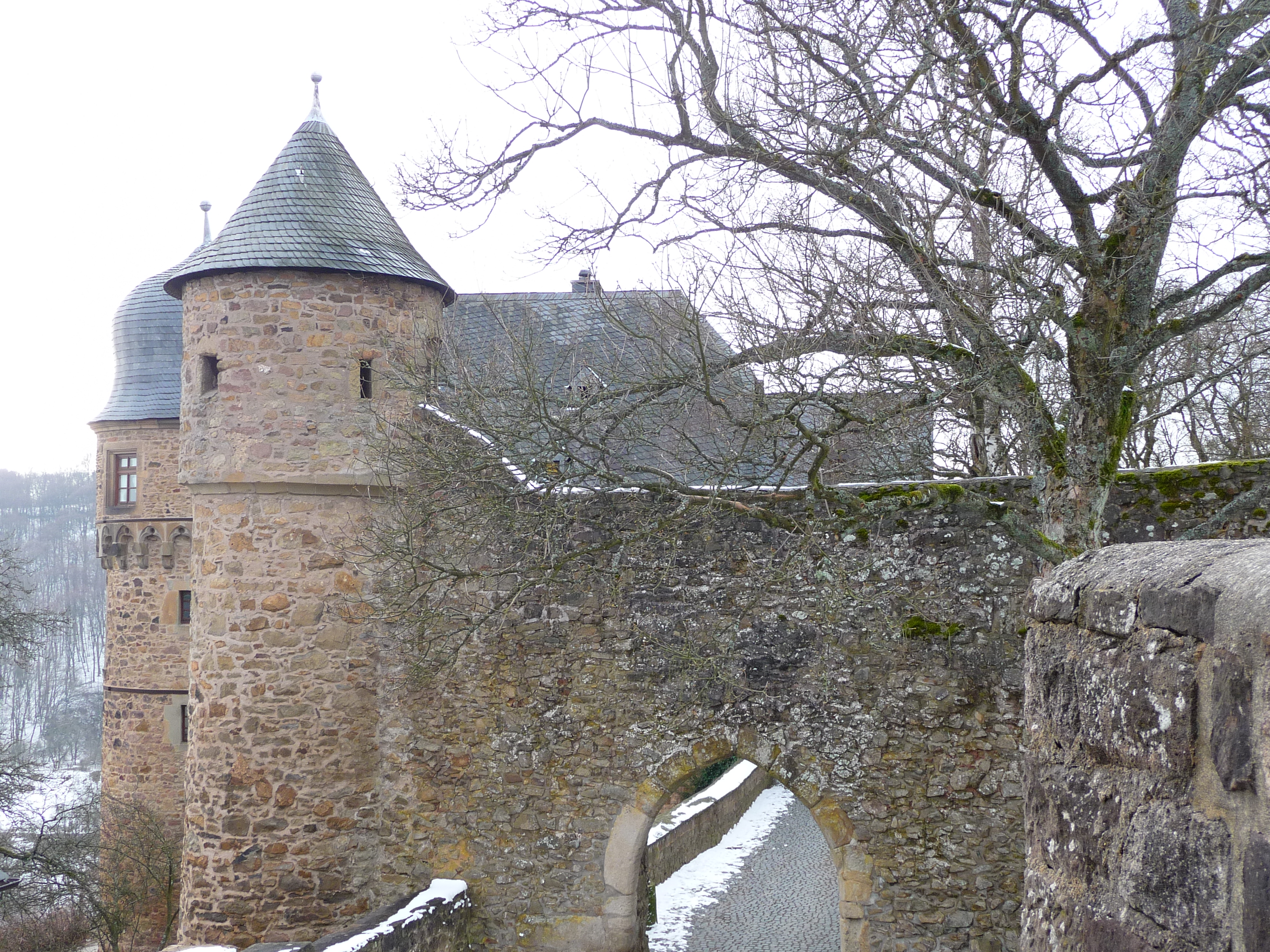
Lichtenberg Castle

In 1971 the castle was handed over by Rhineland-Palatinate to the district of Kusel, and restoration work began. Some of the restorations include the reconstruction of the tithe barn and the repair and roofing of the bergfried.

== Today ==
The horseshoe tower has been the meeting place for the University of Kaiserslautern since 1987. The tower on the southeast corner of the official administrative office also houses a restaurant, the Knight's Hall, and in the administrative office building extension, a youth hostel. In the lower bailey is a church that still conducts services for the parish of Thallichtenberg.

From the bergfried, one can see the Remigiusberg monastery church and ruins of the nearby Michelsburg castle, as well as the Potzberg hill.
