= Jettenbach, Rhineland-Palatinate =

Jettenbach
- Municipality
- Coat of arms

- Location of Jettenbach within Kusel district
- Interactive map of Jettenbach
- Location within Germany Location within Rhineland-Palatinate
- Coordinates: 49°32′08″N 7°33′21″E
- Country: Germany
- State: Rhineland-Palatinate
- District: Kusel
- Municipal assoc.: Lauterecken-Wolfstein

Government
  - Mayor (2019–24): Timo Harth

Area
  - Total: 10.24 km^{2} (3.95 sq mi)
- Elevation: 355 m (1,165 ft)

Population (2025-12-31)
  - Total: 749
  - Density: 73.1/km^{2} (189/sq mi)
- Time zone: UTC+01:00 (CET)
  - Summer (DST): UTC+02:00 (CEST)
- Postal codes: 66887
- Dialling codes: 06385, 06387
- Vehicle registration: KUS
- Website: www.jettenbach.de

Jettenbach (German pronunciation: [ˈjɛtn̩bax]) is an Ortsgemeinde – a municipality belonging to a Verbandsgemeinde, a kind of collective municipality – in the Kusel district which belongs to the federal state of Rhineland-Palatinate in Germany. It belongs to the Verbandsgemeinde Lauterecken-Wolfstein.

== Geography ==
=== Location ===
Topographically, the municipality lies in the North Palatine Uplands. The original village of Jettenbach grew in the valley of an eponymous brook, the Jettenbach, from which it took its name. Quite early on, a mediaeval regular route linking Landstuhl to Trier following the nearby ridge running parallel to the brook was established as a roadway. To the south of the village rises the Spannagelberg (449.5 m above sea level) and to the north, the Potschberg (formerly 492 m above sea level). South of the village, the Rutzenbach and the Selchenbach streams flow together to form the Jettenbach, which then flows north through the village, later emptying into the Talbach, another stream near Eßweiler. To the southeast, the ridge of the Imberg (almost 450 m above sea level) borders the valley. The village's average elevation is reckoned at 355.6 m above sea level. The municipality covers 1 025 ha, of which 69 ha is used for dwelling or transport, 593 ha is under agricultural use and 322 ha is made up of meadows or woodland.

=== Neighbouring municipalities ===
Jettenbach is bordered on its north by the municipality of Eßweiler, in the east by the municipality of Rothselberg, in the southeast by the municipality of Kollweiler, in the southwest by the municipality of Reichenbach-Steegen, and in the west by the municipality of Bosenbach.

=== Constituent communities ===
Also belonging to Jettenbach are the outlying homesteads listed below. They are all Aussiedlerhöfe (agricultural settlements) established after the Second World War to increase food production.

Jettenbach's Aussiedlerhöfe
| Name | Built | Given up | Remarks |
| Gangelborner Hof | ~1958 | 2005 | — |
| Korbüscher Hof | 1971 | — | Riding stable since 1995 |
| Mühlhof | 1959 | — | Still worked |
| Röhlhof | 1965 | 2000 | — |
| Stennenhof | 1974 | — | Livestock raising until 2004; now cropraising, meadows and reforestation |

=== Municipality’s layout ===
Jettenbach is a former farming village, and also one of the villages known for Musikantentum, an industry that formerly sent local musicians all over the world. The village also had regional craft businesses. In earlier times, the village displayed two types of layout depending on whether one viewed it from the east end or the west, with the former layout like a clump village and the latter like a linear village (or by some definitions, a "thorpe"). Rising above the village centre on a small hillock is the Evangelical village parish church, built in 1895-1896, which, owing to the great many Wandermusikanten ("travelling musicians") at one time, is also widely known as the Musikantendom ("Musicians’ Cathedral", although it is not a bishop's seat). Next to it stands the Art Nouveau Leonhard Villa, known in Jettenbach as the Schlösschen ("Little Palace"). In 1989, the new village square with its Musikantenbrunnen – a fountain dedicated to the musicians of yore – was completed at the heart of the village. At the south end of the village, a community recreation area has been under development since 1978. It has a swimming pool (first established by the Nazis in the 1930s), a grass sports ground, and two clay tennis courts. Accompanying the new village primary school is a multipurpose community centre for school sports and other leisure activities. Still in its planning stages is an expansion of a disused rural pathway which is to be repurposed as an educational nature walk with a dry stone wall, featuring various portions of its length in different conditions to host a variety of flora and fauna for visitors to observe.

The local cemetery lies on the way out of the village going towards Bosenbach on the left side of the road.

Today Jettenbach is a bedroom and recreational community with only a few local jobs.

In 1714, an Erbbestandsbrief (document establishing a hereditary trading place)(Erbbestand is a uniquely German land tenure arrangement in which ownership rights and usage rights are separated; this is forbidden by law in modern Germany) was first issued for a small mill north of the village. This mill was refurbished before 1800 and expanded with a farming operation. It never had anything more than local importance, though, because there was only ever enough water to drive it in the winter months. The mill closed about 1930, and torn down in 1958-1959.

== History ==
=== Antiquity ===
Evidence of local inhabitants in and around Jettenbach includes almost every period back to the Stone Age. Of particular note is a settlement hub from the Middle Stone Age which was archaeologically surveyed and analysed over several years. For centuries, Stone Age people camped along the ridge east of the "Witthau" forest. One archaeological find witnessing their presence, a small-bladed knife dates from the late Old Stone Age. At the same site, which was visited several times in the early 1990s, artefacts mainly from the Middle Stone Age were excavated. Only sporadic items were found to date from the New Stone Age.

From the Bronze Age and the Iron Age come the remnants of barrows in the Jungenwald (woods) between Jettenbach and Kollweiler. Little of these mounds’ contents survives. Among the remnants, however, are an axe and a sacrificial blade. Discovered on the Wingertsberg (mountain) was a grave field dated to early Roman times. On the peak of the Potschberg, now been stripped away by stone quarrying, the remnants of a mountain sanctuary from the 2nd or 3rd century AD (Roman period) were found in 1965. Three Roman-era homesteads lay within Jettenbach's current limits with others are suspected. Quite a few coins from the first to the fourth centuries A.D. have been unearthed locally as a result of land surveys along with water pipes and a 5 cm-tall 2nd-century bronze figure of the god Mercury.

Two settlement complexes were examined in greater detail. By 1960, a settlement was found on the municipality's western border with Bosenbach, and an archaeological dig was undertaken. Unearthed here were wall remnants, waste, clay waterpipes and pieces of little heating pipes, leading investigators to conclude that it was a settlement from the 2nd and 3rd centuries. A more thorough investigation was completed at the settlement complex on the Trautmannsberg (or Trautelsberg, but, in either case, a mountain). Here, in 2002-2003, preparations to lay a long-distance gas pipeline facilitated an intensive investigation of the designated ground area. The site proved to house a remarkably large complex of Roman structures over what was a possible temple zone and a villa rustica, accompanied by many outbuildings. An adjoining area of about one hectare was placed under a protection order.

The pipeline route excavations revealed building work from Celtic forerunner buildings, including remnants of posts from pit-houses. In 1995, an urn graveyard from the early Roman period was found to have existed on the Wingertsberg (mountain).

After the Roman withdrawal, the current Jettenbach area was uninhabited for several centuries. Only at Frankish takeover did people settle the area once again.

=== Middle Ages ===
History is silent as to the precise date of Jettenbach's establishment. It is believed to date to before the year 1000, but is first mentioned in a document from 1348 (a full transcription of the document in question, in archaic German, can be found in the German article). At that time, Jettenbach belonged to the extensive area of the Reichsland ("Imperial Land") near Kaiserslautern, which was already subdivided into separate court districts (Gerichte). Jettenbach belonged to the Gericht (or Amt) of Deinsberg (Theißberg). Later, this Amt was described as the Schultheißerei (judicial district) of Reichenbach, and for a time also as the Jettenbacher Gericht. This may well have something to do with where the Schultheiß’s seat was at any given time.

Another document, from 1393, shows that the village once compromised two centres, Obergittenbach and Niedergittenbach. The latter is today's village. The location of the first is, however, as yet uncertain. According to oral tradition, it lay at the forks of the Rutzenbach and the Selchenbach, the municipality's two brooks.

From the first half of the 14th century, the Gericht of Deinsberg belonged to the Counts of Veldenz. At the time, two brothers, Count Heinrich III and Count Friedrich II, divided their holdings, with the village and its Amt seat and associated villages passing to the former. In the letters patent bestowing these holdings upon Count Friedrich III, however, Jettenbach was part of the combined Amt of Reichenbach and Deinsberg, and was split into Ober-Gittenbach and Nieder-Gittenbach. After the Counts of Veldenz died out in 1444, the village, along with the rest of the Amt of Reichenbach, passed to the Dukes of Palatinate-Zweibrücken.

=== Modern times ===
In 1543, Jettenbach passed to the newly formed Principality of Palatinate-Veldenz, headquartered at Lauterecken, with its princely Residenz (and hence, the principality was also known as Veldenz-Lauterecken). Clearer details of village history only emerge from this time.

The Thirty Years' War spelt disaster for Jettenbach, as for so many villages. Given the village's location some way off the military roads, it was possible, if only temporarily, for people to remain there. Due to various factors, it appears, however, that the village was largely destroyed, and that three quarters of the local population fell victim to the war or consequent disease. Refugees sought safety within the walls of Lauterecken, the princely family's residence town.

War's end saw the influx of new settlers to the village to make up for these losses as is witnessed by names in documents. These new villagers intermarried with surviving locals. All soon had to share the ravages of war occasioned by fresh hostilities.

French King Louis XIV's wars of conquest brought the villagers such woe that at times things were as bad as they had been in the Thirty Years' War. The princely House of Veldenz was powerless to do anything about these privations.

In 1694, the princely house's last male dynast died in Strasbourg. From his death arose a dispute between the Duchy of Palatinate-Zweibrücken and the Electorate of the Palatinate as to who was his rightful heir and inheritor of his former domains. The Elector Palatine's troops quickly occupied the Amt of Lauterecken and the Schultheißerei of Reichenbach after the French withdrawal in 1697. The succession struggle, however, was not resolved until 1733.

After centuries of war, disease, and hardship, only in the early 18th century did Jettenbach reach its former size. But by then the villagers had already begun to turn their backs on it. As early as 1708-1709, one Jettenbach family had left the village for fresh opportunities in America. In the late 18th century, many individuals and families sought better incomes in the Danube Monarchy and Russia.

In a compromise between the two princely houses competing to inherit the locality, it was agreed that, from 1733, Jettenbach would be ceded permanently to the Electorate of the Palatinate. This arrangement, however, did not long endure. From the turn of the nineteenth century, French Revolutionary intervention swept away the arrangements of historical ruling class and with it their traditional lordship over Jettenbach. This period, and the Napoleonic era which followed it saw the region under French rule for a further period.

==== Recent times ====
During the years of the French Revolution, the Mairie ("mayoralty") of Jettenbach comprised the villages of Albersbach, Eulenbis, Jettenbach, Kollweiler and Pörrbach. Under the French, the mayoralty belonged to the French canton of Wolfstein, the arrondissement of Kaiserslautern, and the department of Mont-Tonnerre (or Donnersberg in German).

For a time, under French Revolutionary and Napoleonic rule, village emigration ceased. Instead, Jettenbach had to endure a period characterised by the influx of troops on the march, their demands for supplies and their presence when stationed or billeted in the village. On 4 January 1794, troops plundered the village taking everything, not just food and livestock, but even villagers’ household items right down to their clothes.

During Napoleon's campaigns, as French subjects, men from Jettenbach were required to serve as soldiers for the Napoleon's empire, doing so throughout Europe. The empire's downfall brought Jettenbach renewed burdens, with German troops stationed in the village, and the presence of Russian troops during their post-war withdrawal. Under the post-war settlement devised by the Congress of Vienna, which took effect in 1816, the Palatinate was annexed to the Kingdom of Bavaria. Thenceforth, Jettenbach belonged to the canton of Wolfstein and the Landkommissariat of Kusel. Only Kollweiler (until about 1890), and Albersbach (until 1969), remained in the Bürgermeisterei ("mayoralty") of Jettenbach. Jettenbach remained part of the canton of Wolfstein into the 20th century.

In the early 19th century, a marked rise in Jettenbach's population, and the traditional practice of subdividing the land into smaller and smaller parcel by generations of inheritance, led to the economic downfall of many farming families in Jettenbach. This forced many to seek other livelihoods. A surplus of artisans and crafts-folk unable to sell most of their wares led to further waves of emigration in the mid-19th century. Almost exclusively, the emigrants flocked to the United States. The last wave of village emigration involving about 200 people occurred in the 20th century's interwar period.

Isolated as an exclave of the Kingdom of Bavaria, the Palatinate experienced unique economic problems. This led to local efforts to split the Palatinate from Bavaria, culminating in the 1849 Palatine Uprising. In Jettenbach, candidate-teacher, Jettenbach-born Ludwig Heinrich Hauber promoted his ideas of Palatine separatism and freedom taking leave from his post in Katzweiler to dedicate himself to the cause. Hauber's efforts were centred on the canton of Wolfstein where he concentrated on fundraising and organising the Landsturm (people's army).

In Jettenbach itself, a well-attended people's assembly took place on 10 June 1849 in the "Strieth" woods. The next day, Hauber mobilised the Landsturm to repel the advancing Prussians. With few guns at their disposal, most relied on farm implements such as scythes, pitchforks, and flails. Armed with these primitive weapons, they hoped to beat the Prussian army. These volunteers agreed on the precaution that at the first sign of danger they would return to their homes, promptly doing so as the Prussians drew nearer. Deserted by his troops, and before seeing a single Prussian, Hauber decided to flee. In Jettenbach, the "Palatine Revolution" was a complete non-starter.

Until the last third of the 19th century, Jettenbach's economic development was negligible. Small improvements came after the Franco-Prussian War partly due to the Wandermusikanten. This saw whole orchestras from Jettenbach seeking their livelihood elsewhere by performing across of Europe and other parts of the world. Their added buying power and consequent upsurge in building activity was primarily responsible for an improved economic outlook. Whole rows of buildings went up and village life was reinvigorated. By the turn of the 20th century, Jettenbach had over one thousand inhabitants.

This short golden period ended with the outbreak of the First World War. Many men from Jettenbach were conscripted to fight for the Kaiser. Many never came home. After the war, times were hard, with few job opportunities.

From 1926/27, some villagers, mainly young men, flirted with National Socialism. About 1929, there was already a local Nazi cell in Jettenbach, allied to the local group (Ortsgruppe) in Kollweiler, founded in 1928. In 1933, when Adolf Hitler seized power, the Nazis gained control of every seat on the municipal council. The Nazis provided make-work projects benefiting the jobless. The Jettenbach – the village's namesake brook – was straightened and lined with bricks, and a "bathing pond" was built. Gradually orders grew for the local quarry belonging to neighbouring Eßweiler. Eventually it employed over 600 workers.

With the outbreak of the Second World War, most men fit for service were conscripted. The shortfall in agricultural labour was offset by prisoners of war from France and slave labour from the German-occupied territories in Eastern Europe. Jettenbach went through the war unscathed by direct military action, though near war's end, as German troops withdrew ahead of the Allied advance, they were often billeted temporarily in Jettenbach. The last German troops left Jettenbach about midday on 17 March 1945. Outside the village, they quickly found themselves under attack by American airmen. Just over two days later, the first United States Army troops arrived in the village.

Of all the changes that Jettenbach has undergone, the post-war ones have been the most far-reaching. Pre-war Jettenbach was a village of farmers, craftsmen, musicians, and workers. Post-war, these old economic foundations changed within a few years for most people. But even before World War II the high period of the Musikantentum had already ended. Some Musikanten dreamt of a revival, but reality forced them to realise these glory days were over.

By the early 1950s, a shift in Jettenbach's economic foundations saw increasing numbers employed beyond the village with new jobs at places such as the United States Armed Forces in Kaiserslautern, Ramstein, and Miesau.

An upturn in the construction industry created further jobs. In Jettenbach, the farm sector shrank steadily. This also affected the associated handicraft sector with which it had close business links. Today, visitors see a village that is almost entirely residential. Farming can now only be seen at one of the so-called Aussiedlerhöfe (farming hamlets established in modern times), two of which have already closed.

In 1972, Jettenbach was grouped into the newly formed Verbandsgemeinde of Wolfstein.

Few handicraft businesses remain. A butcher's shop and grocery with baked goods ensures the availability of basic local foodstuffs.

The stone quarry run by Basalt AG is the village's economic mainstay. Here, the stone is processed and then either stored in silos for sale or stockpiled in a storage area for onward transport. The yearly yield can be up to 600,000 metric tons. The quarry business linked to a bitumen mixing complex.

Jettenbach's best showing to date in the contest Unser Dorf soll schöner werden ("Our village should become lovelier") was in 2003, when it won second place in the main class at the district level, which qualified it for the Rhenish Hesse-Palatine regional contest, in which it placed first. This was the first time that Jettenbach qualified for the state level, placing seventh.

In November 2003, the Minister of Environment and Forests, Margit Conrad, awarded mayor Bernd Ginkel a special prize for "the municipality’s model ecological performance". This was based mainly on the forward-looking heating plants (wood pellets and woodchips), the solar and photovoltaic complexes, and clear strides in local nature conservation in the municipality.

=== Population development ===
As early as 1709, there documents record the first emigrant to America from Jettenbach. In the late 18th century, there was emigration to southeastern Europe, and, after 1800, to Poland and Bavaria. In the 19th and 20th centuries, there were phases of heavy emigration to the United States. In the 19th century, saw the rise of the Wandermusikantentum industry, in which local inhabitants travelled all over Europe and further afield as musicians. It had its roots in the region's poor economic conditions. Despite waves of emigration, a continuous rise in population figures was recorded, although more recently, this has levelled off. The Wandermusikanten fostered their own family and speech peculiarities, their own customs, and their own specific garb. Their speech was enriched with words drawn from the various languages with which they came into contact while they were abroad. In 1721, Jettenbach had 35 families, and, therefore, roughly 140 inhabitants. In 1815, there were 657 inhabitants, and, in 1905, 1,031.

=== Municipality’s name ===
The first syllable of the municipality's name, Jettenbach, refers to perennial ryegrass (Lolium perenne), which still grows along the village brook today. It comes from the Old High German root jetto, which was used either as a word for "weed" or as the name for the plant perennial ryegrass (in Modern High German, however, it is called Deutsches Weidelgras or Wiesenlolch). Whether, in fact, there was a person whose name was connected with this jetto is unknown. It is thus assumed that whoever the first settlers were, they had to weed (German: ausjäten – here the root does show up) the land of this ryegrass so that they could use it as farmland. To the word jetto, the element —bach (German for "brook") was added, thus making the name's original meaning something like "brook that flows through a dale overgrown with ryegrass". Alongside the name's current form, the form Gettenbach also showed up in the past. Against this, one can compare the dialectical form gäten to the Middle High German jäten, with the J/G variants also in evidence. Among other forms of the name that are known are Jettenbach (1348), Gyttenbach (1377), Obergittenbach and Niedergittenbach (1393), Gettenbach (1571), Göttenbach (1600) and Jettenbach once again.

=== Vanished villages ===
Lying in the northern part of the current municipal area was once another village, Zeißweiler, which may have been older than Jettenbach itself. It was geographically the last place in the string of settlements with names ending in —weiler (German for "hamlet", or originally "homestead") at the end of the Eßweiler Tal (valley or dale). A single legal document from 1432 is all the proof that there is that this village even existed, and even at the time that that was written, the settlement had already been abandoned. Nothing is known of the village's fate, nor of its people's. While it is known that Zeißweiler lay north of Jettenbach at the foot of the Trautelsberg – at least according to researcher Ernst Christmann – its exact location is also unknown.

== Religion ==
About 1600, all the village's inhabitants were Lutheran. Even after the Thirty Years' War, it was mostly Protestants living in Jettenbach. As late as 1825 it was still almost 100%. Then, though, the number of Catholics began to grow slowly. In 1991, there were 63 Catholics in the village.

In the earliest surviving records, Jettenbach belonged to the parish of Reichenbach. At the time of the Protestant Reformation, it remained a filial chapelry after establishment of a Lutheran parish at Reichenbach in 1532. In late 1741, Jettenbach became a Lutheran parish in its own right though the parish register entries continued to be written into those of Reichenbach. From 1741, the neighbouring village of Kollweiler was affiliated to Jettenbach. From the Late Middle Ages, both villages had their own chapels in which clergy from Reichenbach held services. From 1746, Jettenbach's Reformed (Calvinist) believers were served from the newly established Reformed parish at Neunkirchen. In 1971, the two villages of Bosenbach and Niederstaufenbach merged into the Protestant parish of Jettenbach as filial chapelries after the old parish of Bosenbach was dissolved.

The former mediaeval chapel was dedicated to two patrons, Saint Valentine and Saint Anastasius. This chapel was destroyed about 1470, but rebuilt. It was continually repaired and renovated until its replacement 1895/6 when the current parish church was erected in the Gothic Revival style. This new church now bears the nickname Musikantendom (Dom means "cathedral" in German) in recognition of the large number of Wandermusikanten (travelling musicians) who once lived in Jettenbach, and the church's capacity. Church authorities demanded that there be room for at least half the population when the church was built ensuring that there is the pew-space for 532 worshippers. The church's built-in pneumatic conical-windchest organ of 1,149 pipes was installed by the firm Walcker of Ludwigsburg in 1896.

Until 1871, the parish churchyard was the local graveyard. When it reached capacity, a new graveyard was laid out on land lying in the direction of Bosenbach. In 1966, a hall with bell, expanded in 2000/1, was built there.

From 1700, local Roman Catholics belonged to the Lutheran parish of Reichenbach. They had the right to carry out the sacraments of baptism, marriage, and burial at the old village church. As for other church services, however, they were only permitted to observe Laetare Sunday (the third Sunday before Easter) in the old Catholic chapel now occupied by Protestants. After the new parish church was built, the predominantly Protestant population refused to share it with local Catholics. In 1899, the Protestants sold their traditional rights.

== Politics ==
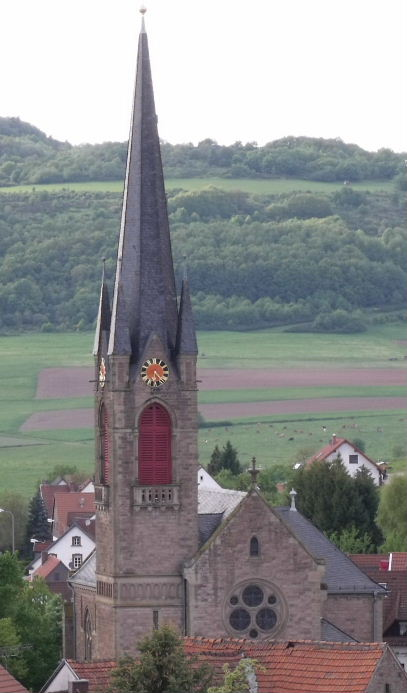
Jettenbach Church ("Musikantendom")

=== Municipal council ===
The council is made up of 12 council members, who were elected by majority vote at the municipal election held on 7 June 2009, and the honorary mayor as chairman.

=== Mayor ===
Jettenbach's mayor is Timo Harth.

=== Coat of arms ===
The German blazon reads: In Grün ein silberner Schräglinkswellenbalken, oben rechts eine goldene Lyra, unten links ein goldenes Ährenbüschel (Wiesenlolch)

The municipality's arms might be rendered into the Norman French employed in English heraldic language as: Vert a bend sinister wavy argent, between a lyre or, and a rye-grass tussock, bendwise sinister of the last, issuant from the base.

The arms were designed in 1967 with the help of then schoolteacher Straßenberg and the Speyer State Archives.

The bend sinister wavy (diagonal wavy stripe) and the ryegrass tussock are both canting charges chosen for their allusion to the municipality's name (see above under Name). The golden lyre represents Jettenbach's past as one of the centres in the Musikantenland.

Jettenbach has borne these arms since 21 April 1967 when they were approved by the Ministry of the Interior in Mainz.

== Culture and sightseeing ==
=== Buildings ===
The following are listed buildings or sites in Rhineland-Palatinate’s Directory of Cultural Monuments:

- Protestant parish church, Kirchstraße 2 – two-naved Gothic Revival hall church, 1895/1896, architect Franz Schöberl, Speyer; furnishings
- At Hauptstraße 31 – sandstone portal, marked 1829
- Near Hauptstraße 46 – hourstone, sandstone column, 19th century
- Hauptstraße 66 – Musikantenhaus ("minstrel’s house"); one-floor plastered building on pedestal floor, 1903/1904, architect Karl Faul, Reichenbach
- Höhstraße 2 – primary school, sandstone-framed plastered building, 1892/1893; Luitpold limetree from 1893
- Honiggasse 1 – Quereinhaus (a combination residential and commercial house divided for these two purposes down the middle, perpendicularly to the street), partly timber-frame, marked 1740 and 1776, one-floor addition with half-hipped roof, workshop building about 1900; stone oven pedestal, marked 1793, oven slab, marked 1720
- At Kirchstraße 5 – stone oven pedestal, marked 1801
- At Kirchstraße 8 – stone oven pedestal, marked 1829

The Quereinhaus at Honiggasse ("Honey Lane") 1 is described elsewhere as a West Palatine farmhouse with a single roof ridge (Einfirstbauernhaus). It is the residential wing that dates from 1740 and the commercial wing that dates from 1776. The residential wing's upper floor is built with exposed timber framing, a decorated groundsill, several chest- and neck-high railings and an oriel window.

The Musikantenhaus at Hauptstraße ("Main Street") 66 is typical in construction for a house belonging to the travelling musicians of yore, especially for the inclusion of a dormer-like gable at the front.

=== Regular events ===
Jettenbach's church's patronal festival (Kermis) is known locally as the Kerwe, and is held on the third Sunday in August, and is, by extension, a celebration for the whole community. In former times, a market was held on the Monday after Laetare Sunday, with a fair at Whitsun. The timing used for the current feast-day was set in 1890. Toward the end of the 19th century, Fasching (Shrovetide Carnival) began to be celebrated in Jettenbach. At that time, masked parades, show booths, and gatherings at local inns were customary. After the First World War, only Kappensitzungen ("Hat Sessions") and the inn sessions continued. Only from the 1950s were great Prunksitzungen (Sessions of the "parliament" of the "Empire of Narren", that is, fools) and masquerade balls held, although the latter barely survive. Every year, on the Third Day of Christmas (27 December), there is a procession featuring a person bound in straw. This odd custom has two possible origins. One version has it arising from the way in which Wanderstag, the day on which servants changed jobs, was celebrated. Alternately, it may be an instance of a Carnival custom having been appropriated to this day.

=== Clubs ===
Jettenbach has the following clubs:

- Arbeiter-Musikverein (merger 1951) — workers’ music club
- Arbeiterverein (1922) — workers’ club
- Gesangverein Harmonie (1860) — glee club
- Krankenpflegeverein (1975) — nursing club
- Landfrauenverein (1969) — local women's association
- Musikverein (1882) — music club
- Pfälzerwaldverein (1974) — Palatine forest hiking club
- Pfälzische Bauern- und Winzerschaft (~1950) — Palatine farmers’ and winegrowers’ club
- Rote Flut (1991) — 1. FC Kaiserslautern fan club for the nearby city's soccer team
- Seniorenverein (1981) — seniors’ club
- SPD-Ortsverein (1946-1948; since 1964) — Social Democratic Party of Germany local chapter
- Tennisverein (1978) — tennis club
- Turn- und Sportverein (1892) — gymnastic and sports club

The glee club "Harmonie" 1860 Jettenbach e.V. celebrated its 150th anniversary in 2010 and is among the Kusel district's oldest clubs (inexplicably, another source identifies this club as a forerunner of the music club, and identifies its founding year as 1885). Jettenbach's Turn- und Sportverein Jettenbach (sport club) has the largest membership.

Some clubs have passed into history:

- Ackerbauverein (1927-1957) — crop-raising society
- Gewerbeverein (~1900-1933) — enterprise society
- Kriegerverein (1874-1933) — war veterans’ society
- Viehversicherungsverein (1868-~1945) — livestock insurance society
- Volksbildungsverein (~1900-~1925) — people's development society

== Economy and infrastructure ==
=== Economic structure ===
Nineteenth-century agriculture in Jettenbach was characterized by many small farms. The farmers with bigger farms had horses, and sometimes oxen as draught animals. On smaller farms, the cow was used as a draught animal. From this need arose the almost exclusive use of the Glan-Donnersberg breed of cattle. It dominated in Jettenbach even into the 1960s. Most farms did cropraising and livestock husbandry. Pig farming was rather rare, and sheep were only raised until about the turn of the 19th century. Specialized crops are no longer raised in Jettenbach, although the village is said to have been a main growing centre for rapeseed in the Landcommissariat of Kusel in the years after 1820 (4 226 hl in 1826). About 1870, herb growing, particularly for the seed, was important in the village. Among the herbs then grown were hops, for the brewery that was then found in Jettenbach. Winegrowing may have been practised here in the Middle Ages, bearing witness to which are certain local cadastral toponyms. Between 1870 and 1900 there was once again a vineyard (1 000 m^{2}) in the village. There was also fruitgrowing in a meadow orchard.

After 1840, as in so many other villages in the district, a new industry arose, Wandermusikantentum, which saw local musicians travel the world over plying their trade. Men – it was most often men – went abroad in groups of 5 to 15 and earned their living by playing music. Mostly they had firm engagements at spa hotels or bathing beaches. Early on in Wandermusikantentum, the musicians sometimes also took jugglers along with them. They could sometimes also be hired as circus orchestras. In the United States, they travelled on pleasure steamers on the country's great rivers. In the early days, the musicians went to neighbouring countries such as France, Belgium, the Netherlands and Switzerland. After the Franco-Prussian War (1870-1871), they no longer went to France, though, a country still seething at the loss of the war, and of a sizeable piece of territory, Alsace-Lorraine, to the newly minted German Empire. Instead, they focused their efforts on Eastern Europe. It was only in the 1880s that some of these local musicians became bold enough to visit the United States, but before the turn of the century, there were few parts of the world where the Wandermusikanten had not trodden. It was not unheard-of for them to seek work in South Africa, Australia or Southeast Asia. How long they were away from home depended to a great extent on how far away they went. One of their American tours, for instance, might last 20 months, while those who went to make music in Australia might not see home for five years. Jobs within Europe, however, allowed them to work only nine months of the year and return home for the winter. In 1908, there were 102 musicians living in Jettenbach. They only interrupted the plying of their craft when they were forced to – by the First World War. Many were away from Germany when this broke out, and found themselves in countries that had suddenly become hostile towards Germans. In the United Kingdom, Australia and the United States, many were interned. After the war, there was a great decline in this industry, and then, after Adolf Hitler and the Nazis started the Third Reich in the 1930s, the industry was forsaken, utterly.

Aside from a very small amount of mining towards the end of the 18th century (iron ore, quicksilver) and coal mining (about 1860), the only mining that can be mentioned is limestone and basalt quarrying. Limestone was already being quarried in the 16th century. In the 19th century, there were several lime kilns in Jettenbach. Limestone quarrying was, however, given up in 1903. At the turn of the 20th century, hard-stone quarries were being opened up. When railways were built through the Glan and Lauter valleys, transporting the stone to faraway markets became possible. Thus, several quarries opened in Jettenbach where paving stones were made. In the 1920s, some 60 quarrymen from Jettenbach worked at the nearby quarry on the Schneeweiderhof. Today, one of the Palatinate's most productive quarries lies in the Jettenbach area, on the Potschberg.

Many Jettenbachers have since found jobs in Kaiserslautern, NATO’s Ramstein Air Base in Ramstein-Miesenbach or elsewhere in the narrower or broader area around Jettenbach. Thus, most inhabitants nowadays are commuters. The village’s first watermain was built in 1909, but nowadays, Jettenbach is hooked up to the West Palatinate joint water authority. The first electrical hookup came in October 1922. There has only been a gas main available, however, since November 1991.

=== Education ===
Even before 1700, a school had been set up in Jettenbach, which was overseen by the Lutheran pastor. Mentioned towards the end of the 18th century, besides the schoolteacher hired by the Lutherans, was a Reformed (Calvinist) schoolmaster who oversaw the winter school (a school geared towards an agricultural community’s practical needs, held in the winter, when farm families had a bit more time to spare). In 1819, a new schoolhouse with two classrooms was built, whereupon a teaching assistant was hired and placed at the schoolteacher’s disposal to help him with the second class. In 1882, a third class was formed once another schoolhouse had been built. In 1891, the municipality then built yet another schoolhouse with two classrooms, and the old schoolhouse was given up. These three classrooms were in service until 1965, when grade levels 7 and 8 were transferred to the Mittelpunktschule ("midpoint school", a central school, designed to eliminate smaller outlying schools) in Wolfstein. In 1971, the Jettenbach and Rothselberg schools for grade levels 1 to 4 were combined, with Eßweiler, Hinzweiler and Oberweiler im Tal joining in 1988. The five villages now together formed the Königslandgrundschule ("King’s Land Primary School" – from an historical name for the region), which currently still serves three of the villages. A one-and-a-half-floor primary school building for these three villages was built in 2001-2002 in Jettenbach. Also built by the municipality at the school was a multipurpose hall that could serve the school's sport needs. From the beginning of the 20th century until the late 1920s, there was also a vocational school in Jettenbach.

==== Kindergarten ====
In 1973, the Kusel district's first central kindergarten was built in Jettenbach, to be attended by children from Eßweiler, Jettenbach, Hinzweiler, Oberweiler im Tal and Rothselberg. After the special-purposes committee had been dissolved, a new, local kindergarten was built in Jettenbach. This was brought into service in the spring of 2004. The other municipalities had already built their own kindergartens in Hinzweiler and Rothselberg.

=== Transport ===
To the east runs Bundesstraße 270. Running through the village itself are Landesstraßen 370 and 369. Serving Kreimbach-Kaulbach is a railway station on the Lautertalbahn.

== Famous people ==
=== Sons and daughters of the town ===
- Dr. Carl Andreae (b. 1841; d. 1913 in Munich) — Educator, seminary inspector at the teacher-training institute in Kaiserslautern, member of the state school inspectorate in Bavaria, 1893-1907 Liberal Party member of the Bavarian Landtag, Privatdozent at LMU Munich.
- Ludwig Heinrich Hauber (b. 1827; d. 1902 in Arch, Austria-Hungary [now Arco, Italy]) — School assistant, 1849 revolutionary, civil engineer. After participating in the Revolution, he was barred from returning to teaching. After working various jobs in industry and crafts, he had the luck to marry into wealth. Along with his wife he endowed several foundations in the Palatinate.
- Karl Kiefer (b. 1871; d. 1957 in Munich) — Sculptor and professor in Munich
- Hubertus "Bertes" Kilian (b. 1827; d. 1899 in Munich) — "Minstrel" (travelling musician), Imperial Chinese Orchestra Master, one of the best known and most widely travelled of the Wandermusikanten.
- Jakob Leonhard (b. 1859; d. 1931 in Heidelberg) — Secret commercial councillor, Director of the Kaiserslautern worsted-spinning mill, founding member of the Verband Pfälzischer Industrieller ("Association of Palatine Industrialists").

=== Famous people associated with the municipality ===
- Franz Leonhard (b. 1852; d. 1905 in Neckargemünd) — Chemist. He was on staff at the Rottweil powder factory, where he was involved in research and development, earning several patents for, among other things, the development of a smokeless powder.
- Johann Heinrich August Schowalter (b. 1870 in Neustadt; d. 1940 in Berlin) — Pastor (Jettenbach 1903-1910), he dedicated himself to bettering the population's economic state and providing people's needs in the local area. He was, among other things, an ardent campaigner for a school for training professional musicians in Jettenbach.
