= Rothselberg =

- Municipality
- Coat of arms

- Location of Rothselberg within Kusel district
- Interactive map of Rothselberg
- Location within Germany Location within Rhineland-Palatinate
- Coordinates: 49°32′46.30″N 7°35′32.55″E
- Country: Germany
- State: Rhineland-Palatinate
- District: Kusel
- Municipal assoc.: Lauterecken-Wolfstein

Government
  - Mayor (2019–24): Rainer Mohr

Area
  - Total: 8.74 km^{2} (3.37 sq mi)
- Elevation: 343 m (1,125 ft)

Population (2025-12-31)
  - Total: 618
  - Density: 70.7/km^{2} (183/sq mi)
- Time zone: UTC+01:00 (CET)
  - Summer (DST): UTC+02:00 (CEST)
- Postal codes: 67753
- Dialling codes: 06304
- Vehicle registration: KUS

Rothselberg is an Ortsgemeinde – a municipality belonging to a Verbandsgemeinde, a kind of collective municipality – in the Kusel district in Rhineland-Palatinate, Germany. It belongs to the Verbandsgemeinde Lauterecken-Wolfstein.

== Geography ==
=== Location ===
Rothselberg lies at the foot of the 546 m-high Selberg in the North Palatine Uplands. The village's elevation is some 340 m above sea level and it lies on the ridge between the Talbach and Lauter valleys. Near the village rises the Breitenbach, which flows into the Jettenbach about 3 km away to the northwest in Eßweiler. At the foot of the Selberg rises the Lammelbach, which flows through the Löffelmannsgraben and empties into the Lauter near the Schmeißbachermühle (a former mill). To the west, towards Jettenbach, the land rises up, peaking at the Eisenstein (460 m above sea level), while to the south, towards Kollweiler, it also rises, reaching the peak of the Galgenberg (“Gallows Mountain”) at 431 m above sea level. The municipal area measures 875 ha, of which 170 ha is wooded and 20 ha is built up.

=== Neighbouring municipalities ===
Rothselberg borders in the northeast on the municipality of Rutsweiler an der Lauter, in the east on the municipality of Kreimbach-Kaulbach, in the southeast on the municipality of Frankelbach, in the southwest on the municipality of Kollweiler, in the west on the municipality of Jettenbach and in the northwest on the municipality of Eßweiler. Rothselberg also meets the municipalities of Erzenhausen and Sulzbachtal at a single point in the south.

=== Constituent communities ===
Rothselberg's Ortsteile are the main centre, likewise called Rothselberg, and the outlying homestead of the Sonnenhof. The Sonnenhof arose as an outlying agricultural settlement (Aussiedlerhof) south of the actual village.

=== Municipality’s layout ===
The houses around the old church can be considered Rothselberg's village core. Around this neighbourhood in turn over time, new residential areas have arisen. New building zones were laid out in the village's north end after the Second World War. During the 19th century, the village expanded only slightly, and even the new building work done in the wake of the Second World War was not very great. The houses that are still standing today from earlier times are often still farmhouses, designed as Einfirsthäuser (houses with a single roof ridge). The Sonnenhof, whose name means “Sun Farm” or “Sun Estate”, arose as a rural Aussiedlerhof (farming estate established after the war to increase food production) south of the actual village site. The graveyard, too, lies at the village's southern outskirts.

== History ==
=== Antiquity ===
The Rothselberg area has been rich in prehistoric and Roman archaeological finds. The hammerstones found by Hugo Molter come from the Old Stone Age, making them more than 500,000 years old. Also unearthed were arrowheads, cutting tools and hand axes. Five archaeological sites within Rothselberg's limits are believed to be villae rusticae. One, in the strip-field known as Ahlenkirchen, was excavated by Sprater, and from its footprint, it was measured. Further finds from the other presumed Roman estate sites have been confirmed as being from Roman times.

=== Middle Ages ===
In 1377, Rothselberg had its first documentary mention. The Protestant church was built in the earlier half of the 14th century. From the time of its founding, Rothselberg lay within the free Imperial Domain (Reichsland) around Kaiserslautern. Thus, every village in the domain, one after another, was pledged to various lordships beginning in the 14th century, and so it also was with Rothselberg. In 1350, it was in the trusteeship of the County of Veldenz and the Electorate of Trier. According to Goswin Widder, in 1419, Konrad von Randeck the Younger was enfeoffed with, among other things, the tithes from the Rade von Seelberg (that is, Rothselberg; Rade was a word that meant “clearing”). In 1420, Archbishop Konrad III of Mainz gave Friedrich von Flörsheim one sixth of the tithes from the Rode Seelberg (another former form of the village's name). In 1455, Frederick I, Elector Palatine claimed in a feud letter – one used to declare a feud – sent to his cousin Louis I, Count Palatine of Zweibrücken that he had been done a disservice im Riche zu Rade Seelberg (“in the realm at Rothselberg”). Thus, it is known that at this time, Rothselberg lay in the Electorate of the Palatinate.

=== Modern times ===
Rothselberg remained in the Electorate of the Palatinate until feudalism was abolished in the course of the French Revolution. Electorate of the Palatinate further pledged the village for a while (mid 16th century) to the County of Sickingen. During the Thirty Years' War, the village was destroyed. The population was decimated not only by this war but also by the Plague. After the war ended, the village was settled once again. Only in the 18th century did the population once again rise at any great rate. It cannot be determined with any certainty when Rothselberg became the centre of a court region. Goswin Widder, though, wrote in 1788: “The court of Roth-Seelberg along with the villages that are counted as part of it, Rußweiler, Kaulbach, Kreimbach and Frankelbach, has posted to it one Schultheiß and four Schöffen (roughly “lay jurists”). It bears in its seal a springing wolf.”

==== Recent times ====
During French rule from 1801 to 1814, Rothselberg belonged to the Mairie (“Mayoralty”) of Wolfstein, the Canton of Wolfstein, the Arrondissement of Kaiserslautern and the Department of Mont-Tonnerre (or Donnersberg in German), whose seat was at Mainz. After Napoleonic times ended and the Congress of Vienna went into effect, Rothselberg passed in 1816 along with the rest of the Palatinate to the Kingdom of Bavaria, within which it was still grouped into the Canton of Wolfstein, but now within the Landkommissariat of Kusel, which over time became the Bezirksamt of Kusel, and finally the district of Kusel. At the end of the First World War, Bavaria lost its status as a kingdom, and at the end of the Second World War, Bavaria lost its exclave in the Palatinate. In the late 1920s and early 1930s, the Nazi Party (NSDAP) became very popular in Rothselberg. In the 1928 Reichstag elections, only 17.8% of the local votes went to Adolf Hitler’s party, but by the 1930 Reichstag elections, this had grown to 31.0%. By the time of the 1933 Reichstag elections, after Hitler had already seized power, local support for the Nazis had swollen to 95.9%. Hitler's success in these elections paved the way for his Enabling Act of 1933 (Ermächtigungsgesetz), thus starting the Third Reich in earnest. Beginning in 1945, the Palatinate lay within the then newly founded state of Rhineland-Palatinate and was in the course of series of administrative reforms in 1968 united with Rhenish Hesse. These reforms to boundaries and administration brought changes for Rothselberg as well. The village was now grouped as an Ortsgemeinde into the Verbandsgemeinde of Wolfstein.

=== Population development ===
The Rothselberg villagers originally all earned their livelihoods at agriculture, and even by 1933, fully 43% of them still did. Nowadays, only a small minority work the land. In earlier times there were also day labourers and forestry workers. Since that time, the great majority in the village has come to be workers who must commute to jobs elsewhere, mainly to Wolfstein and Kaiserslautern. In contrast with other out-of-the-way villages in the Western Palatinate, transport links are relatively favourable because the village lies near Wolfstein and Kaiserslautern, and there has been no great drop in population as there has been in comparable villages whose transport links are not quite as favourable.

In the late 18th century, 52 families lived in Rothselberg, amounting to 332 inhabitants. By 1825 this had grown to 589 inhabitants, all cleaving to the Evangelical faith. As the 19th century wore on, the population growth was steady: in 1835 there were 704, and 778 by 1871; the population peaked in 1905 at 801. By 1935, however, Rothselberg had only 695 inhabitants. In 1961, because of ethnic Germans driven out of Germany's former eastern territories who had come to settle, the figure was back up to 793 inhabitants, 30 of whom were Catholic. In 1998, 782 people were living in Rothselberg, and in 2005 the inhabitants numbered 795.

The inhabitants’ voting patterns in earlier years exhibited a moderate conservative tendency, but since then, there has been a strong swing to support for the left-of-centre Social Democratic Party of Germany (SPD).

The following table shows population figures for Rothselberg over the centuries, and in some instances breaks the population down by religious affiliation:

Year	1825	1835	1871	1905	1939	1961	2007
Total	589	704	778	801	695	793	722
Catholic	–					30	
Evangelical	589					763	

=== Vanished villages ===
According to author J. G. Widder, in the late 18th century, there were still 11 “minor estates” lying within Rothselberg's limits, which likely meant small, manageable agricultural areas upon which possibly only one farmhouse stood. A place named Ahlenkirchen was still being named in 1742. This village lay in the area where the reservoir for the former local waterworks was built in 1906.

=== Municipality’s name ===
Over the ages, the village has borne the following names in documents: Rode (1377), Rodeselberg (1400), Rade am Seelberg (1419), Rodeseleberg (1420), Rode (1437/1438), im Rich zu Rodeselberg (1455), zu Röde (1500), Rottselberg (1555), Rodtselberg (about 1600), Rodt Selberg (1684), Roth am Selberg (1822), Rothseelberg (1824). The name's meaning is simple enough to discern: it denotes a village on land that was cleared relatively late near the Selberg, a mountain within the municipality's limits just north of the actual village.

== Religion ==
Rothselberg belonged to the Diocese of Mainz until the Reformation, whereupon all the villagers converted to Protestantism. Unlike what happened in many places in the Electorate of the Palatinate, there was no appreciable reversion to Catholic belief later on. Even today, the overwhelming majority of the villagers is Evangelical. The church itself arose as far back as the Romanesque period, and extensive conversions notwithstanding – especially the ones undertaken about 1787 – it still specifically bears features of Romanesque architecture. In the quire tower, mediaeval paintings have been uncovered and restored. Rothselberg was the seat of a parish that also comprised the villages of Kaulbach, Kreimbach with Schmeißbach, and Frankelbach. Even today, Rothselberg is home to an Evangelical parish office. Catholics attend church services in Wolfstein.

== Politics ==
=== Municipal council ===
The council is made up of 12 council members, who were elected by majority vote at the municipal election held on 7 June 2009, and the honorary mayor as chairman.

=== Mayor ===
Rothselberg's mayor is Rainer Mohr, and his deputies are Peter Baumhardt and Jürgen Hemmer.

=== Coat of arms ===
The German blazon reads, according to one source: In Gold auf grünem Boden ein schwarzer Wolf, an einem aus dem rechten Schildrand hervorbrechenden natürlichen Felsen anspringend. According to another, it reads: In Gold auf grünem Boden ein schwarzer Wolf, der über einen weißen Felsstein springt. These two blazons would yield the same arms, but they are expressed somewhat differently.

The municipality's arms might in English heraldic language be described thus: Or on ground vert a wolf salient sable langued gules over, issuant from dexter base, a stone argent.

As Widder attests above, the former court bore a springing wolf in its seal. This was adopted as a charge in the municipality's new coat of arms. A wolf in a similar attitude can be seen in nearby Kreimbach-Kaulbach’s arms. As also mentioned above, this municipality (originally two villages) belonged to the same court region until the French Revolution. The arms have been borne since 8 August 1988, when they were approved by the now defunct Rheinhessen-Pfalz Regierungsbezirk administration in Neustadt an der Weinstraße.

== Culture and sightseeing ==
=== Buildings ===
The following are listed buildings or sites in Rhineland-Palatinate’s Directory of Cultural Monuments:

- Protestant parish church, Hauptstraße 60 – Late Gothic quire, 14th century, and belltower 1433/1434, quire and nave converted in 1754–1756; wall painting fragments from the earlier half of the 14th century; bell 1496 by Johannes Otto, Kaiserslautern; before the church a warriors’ memorial by Rudolf Henn, Kaiserslautern

=== Regular events ===
Rothselberg holds its kermis (church consecration festival, locally known as the Kerb) on the weekend before Johannistag. Other customs follow the general pattern seen throughout the North Palatinate.

=== Clubs ===
Rothselberg currently has the following clubs:

- Fire brigade promotional association
- Youth promotional association
- Kindergarten promotional association
- Nursing association
- Countrywomen's club
- “Reerer Biker” motorcycle fans’ club
- Sellberg-Chor (choir)
- Sellberg-Verein (“Sellberg Club”)
- Local SPD association
- Sport club

== Economy and infrastructure ==
=== Economic structure ===
Originally, Rothselberg was a purely agricultural village in which there were also the customary craftsmen. Today, agriculture plays only a lesser role in the village's economy. Rothselberg is said to be a rural residential community for people from the most varied of occupations and is now making an effort to further its tourism industry.

=== Education ===
From Kramer's book, Schulwesen im Herzogtum Zweibrücken (“Schooling in the Duchy of Palatinate-Zweibrücken”) it can be seen that Rothselberg was the seat during the French Revolution of a Reformed parish, and that the pastor also had to inspect the schools within that jurisdiction. Today, primary school pupils and Hauptschule students attend their respective schools in Wolfstein. The village itself also has a kindergarten.

=== Transport ===
Two kilometres to the east of Rothselberg runs Bundesstraße 270, which can be reached at a T-junction 2 km from the village on Landesstraße 370 (Altenglan-Wolfstein), on which Rothselberg also lies. Landesstraße 372 also crosses the municipality. This leads to Offenbach am Glan towards the north and Landstuhl towards the south. The nearest Autobahn interchanges are near Kaiserslautern and Kusel. Serving Kreimbach-Kaulbach is a railway station on the Lautertalbahn.

== Famous people ==
=== Sons and daughters of the town ===
- Wilhelm Weißmann (b. 18 June 1856; d. 27 December 1937 in Metz), politician in Alsace-Lorraine, one of the few “Old Germans” (that is, the ones who had moved from other parts of Imperial Germany to Alsace-Lorraine after the 1871 Treaty of Frankfurt) whom the French authorities allowed to remain in the region once France had taken it back over after the 1919 Treaty of Versailles.
