= Kaiserslautern (electoral district) =

Federal electoral district of Germany

208 Kaiserslautern
- Electoral district for the Bundestag
- Kaiserslautern in 2025
- State: Rhineland-Palatinate
- Population: 298,200 (2019)
- Electorate: 219,832 (2025)
- Major settlements: Kaiserslautern; Eisenberg; Kirchheimbolanden
- Area: 1,696.2 km^{2}

Current electoral district
- Created: 1949
- Party: SPD
- Member: Matthias Mieves
- Elected: 2021, 2025

Kaiserslautern is an electoral constituency (German: Wahlkreis) represented in the Bundestag. It elects one member via first-past-the-post voting. Under the current constituency numbering system, it is designated as constituency 208. It is located in southern Rhineland-Palatinate, comprising the city of Kaiserslautern, the Donnersbergkreis district, the Kusel district, and the northeastern part of the Landkreis Kaiserslautern district.

Kaiserslautern was created for the inaugural 1949 federal election. Since 2023, it has been represented by Matthias Mieves of the Social Democratic Party (SPD).

== Geography ==
Kaiserslautern is located in southern Rhineland-Palatinate. As of the 2021 federal election, it comprises the independent city of Kaiserslautern, the district of Donnersbergkreis, the district of Donnersbergkreis, and the Verbandsgemeinden of Enkenbach-Alsenborn, Otterbach-Otterberg, and Weilerbach.

== History ==
Kaiserslautern was created in 1949. In the 1949 election, it was Rhineland-Palatinate constituency 13 in the numbering system. In the 1953 through 1961 elections, it was number 160. In the 1965 through 1976 elections, it was number 161. In the 1980 through 1998 elections, it was number 159. In the 2002 election, it was number 212. In the 2005 election, it was number 211. In the 2009 and 2013 elections, it was number 210. In the 2017 and 2021 elections, it was number 209. From the 2025 election, it has been number 208.

Originally, the constituency comprised the city of Kaiserslautern and the districts of Landkreis Kaiserslautern and Kusel. It acquired its current borders in the 2002 election.

Election	No.	Name	Borders
1949	13	Kaiserslautern	Kaiserslautern city; Kusel district; Landkreis Kaiserslautern district
1953	160	Kaiserslautern	Kaiserslautern city; Kusel district; Landkreis Kaiserslautern district
1957	160	Kaiserslautern	Kaiserslautern city; Kusel district; Landkreis Kaiserslautern district
1961	160	Kaiserslautern	Kaiserslautern city; Kusel district; Landkreis Kaiserslautern district
1965	161	Kaiserslautern	Kaiserslautern city; Kusel district; Landkreis Kaiserslautern district
1969	161	Kaiserslautern	Kaiserslautern city; Kusel district; Landkreis Kaiserslautern district
1972	161	Kaiserslautern	Kaiserslautern city; Kusel district; Landkreis Kaiserslautern district
1976	161	Kaiserslautern	Kaiserslautern city; Kusel district; Landkreis Kaiserslautern district
1980	159	Kaiserslautern	Kaiserslautern city; Kusel district; Landkreis Kaiserslautern district
1983	159	Kaiserslautern	Kaiserslautern city; Kusel district; Landkreis Kaiserslautern district
1987	159	Kaiserslautern	Kaiserslautern city; Kusel district; Landkreis Kaiserslautern district
1990	159	Kaiserslautern	Kaiserslautern city; Kusel district; Landkreis Kaiserslautern district
1994	159	Kaiserslautern	Kaiserslautern city; Kusel district; Landkreis Kaiserslautern district
1998	159	Kaiserslautern	Kaiserslautern city; Kusel district; Landkreis Kaiserslautern district
2002	212	Kaiserslautern	Kaiserslautern city; Donnersbergkreis district; Kusel district; Landkreis Kaiserslautern district (only Enkenbach-Alsenborn, Otterbach-Otterberg, and Weilerbach Verbandsgemeinden)
2005	211	Kaiserslautern	Kaiserslautern city; Donnersbergkreis district; Kusel district; Landkreis Kaiserslautern district (only Enkenbach-Alsenborn, Otterbach-Otterberg, and Weilerbach Verbandsgemeinden)
2009	210	Kaiserslautern	Kaiserslautern city; Donnersbergkreis district; Kusel district; Landkreis Kaiserslautern district (only Enkenbach-Alsenborn, Otterbach-Otterberg, and Weilerbach Verbandsgemeinden)
2013	210	Kaiserslautern	Kaiserslautern city; Donnersbergkreis district; Kusel district; Landkreis Kaiserslautern district (only Enkenbach-Alsenborn, Otterbach-Otterberg, and Weilerbach Verbandsgemeinden)
2017	209	Kaiserslautern	Kaiserslautern city; Donnersbergkreis district; Kusel district; Landkreis Kaiserslautern district (only Enkenbach-Alsenborn, Otterbach-Otterberg, and Weilerbach Verbandsgemeinden)
2021	209	Kaiserslautern	Kaiserslautern city; Donnersbergkreis district; Kusel district; Landkreis Kaiserslautern district (only Enkenbach-Alsenborn, Otterbach-Otterberg, and Weilerbach Verbandsgemeinden)
2025	208	Kaiserslautern	Kaiserslautern city; Donnersbergkreis district; Kusel district; Landkreis Kaiserslautern district (only Enkenbach-Alsenborn, Otterbach-Otterberg, and Weilerbach Verbandsgemeinden)

== Members ==
The constituency has been held by the Social Democratic Party (SPD) during all but two Bundestag terms since its creation. It was first represented by Adolf Ludwig of the SPD from 1949 to 1953. August Spies of the Christian Democratic Union (CDU) was elected in 1953 and served until 1961. Adolf Müller-Emmert regained it for the SPD in 1961 and was representative until 1987, a total of seven consecutive terms. He was succeeded by Rose Götte from 1987 to 1994. Hansjörg Schäfer then served two terms from 1994 to 2002. Gustav Herzog was representative from 2002 to 2021. He was succeeded by Matthias Mieves in 2021, who was re-elected in 2025.

Election	Member	Party	%
1949	Adolf Ludwig	SPD	36.5
1953	August Spies	CDU	37.8
1957	August Spies	CDU	42.8
1961	Adolf Müller-Emmert	SPD	41.4
1965	Adolf Müller-Emmert	SPD	46.5
1969	Adolf Müller-Emmert	SPD	49.4
1972	Adolf Müller-Emmert	SPD	55.7
1976	Adolf Müller-Emmert	SPD	50.8
1980	Adolf Müller-Emmert	SPD	52.6
1983	Adolf Müller-Emmert	SPD	48.9
1987	Rose Götte	SPD	48.7
1990	Rose Götte	SPD	47.3
1994	Hansjörg Schäfer	SPD	47.9
1998	Hansjörg Schäfer	SPD	50.9
2002	Gustav Herzog	SPD	49.9
2005	Gustav Herzog	SPD	44.2
2009	Gustav Herzog	SPD	34.6
2013	Gustav Herzog	SPD	38.5
2017	Gustav Herzog	SPD	33.9
2021	Matthias Mieves	SPD	33.9
2025	Matthias Mieves	SPD	28.0

== Election results ==
=== 2025 election ===
Federal election (2025): Kaiserslautern
Notes:	Blue background denotes the winner of the electorate vote. Pink background denotes a candidate elected from their party list. Yellow background denotes an electorate win by a list member, or other incumbent. A ✓ or ✗ denotes status of any incumbent, win or lose respectively.						
Party	Candidate	Votes	%	±%	Party votes	%	±%
AfD	Sebastian Münzenmaier	45,159	25.5	▲13.5	45,952	25.9	▲13.5
CDU	Frank Burgdörfer	42,591	24.1	▲2.6	44,231	24.9	▲5.1
SPD	✓ Matthias Mieves	49,462	28.0	▼5.9	36,500	20.5	▼12.0
Greens	Lea Siegfried	10,099	5.7	▼3.0	14,624	8.2	▼2.3
Left	Stefan Glander	7,397	4.2	▲0.1	10,770	6.1	▲2.3
BSW	Alexander Ulrich	7,629	4.3	New	8,837	5.0	New
FDP	Christian Kopp	5,137	2.9	▼4.2	6,973	3.9	▼6.4
FW	Jasmin Awan	7,385	4.2	▼3.2	4,695	2.6	▼2.2
Tierschutzpartei					2,649	1.5	▼0.4
Volt	Marvin Ballat	1,570	0.9	▲0.4	992	0.6	▲0.1
PARTEI					797	0.4	▼0.5
BD	Tim Meinhold	453	0.3	New	331	0.2	New
ÖDP					236	0.1	0.0
MLPD					56	<0.1	Steady
Informal votes		2,318			1,557		
Total valid votes		176,882			177,643		
Turnout		179,200	81.5	▲6.2			
SPD hold	Majority	4,303	2.5	▼9.9			

=== 2021 election ===
Federal election (2021): Kaiserslautern
Notes:	Blue background denotes the winner of the electorate vote. Pink background denotes a candidate elected from their party list. Yellow background denotes an electorate win by a list member, or other incumbent. A ✓ or ✗ denotes status of any incumbent, win or lose respectively.						
Party	Candidate	Votes	%	±%	Party votes	%	±%
SPD	Matthias Mieves	56,523	33.9	0.0	54,460	32.5	▲4.3
CDU	Xaver Jung	35,803	21.5	▼9.8	33,226	19.8	▼9.3
AfD	Marco Staudt	20,002	12.0	▼0.6	20,702	12.4	▼1.3
Greens	Michael Kunte	14,589	8.7	▲3.7	17,611	10.5	▲3.8
FW	Thomas Lebkücher	12,225	7.3	▲4.5	8,042	4.8	▲2.7
FDP	Jana Lumbur	11,870	7.1	▲1.7	17,242	10.3	▲1.2
Left	Alexander Ulrich	6,753	4.1	▼3.2	6,383	3.8	▼4.2
Tierschutzpartei	Patrick Kühn-Breisch	3,197	1.9		3,168	1.9	
PARTEI	Derya Sujana-Şen	2,154	1.3	▼0.2	1,641	1.0	▼0.3
dieBasis	Torsten Friedrichs	2,159	1.3		2,055	1.2	
Pirates					695	0.4	▼0.1
Volt	Malte Schümann	801	0.5		685	0.4	
Team Todenhöfer					432	0.3	
Independent	Marius Lauer	392	0.2				
NPD					298	0.2	▼0.3
ÖDP					253	0.2	0.0
Humanists					171	0.1	
V-Partei3					142	0.1	▼0.2
DiB					121	0.1	
LKR	Petra Winkler	154	0.1		101	0.1	
Independent	Dirk Hoppe	147	0.1				
MLPD					36	0.0	0.0
Independent	Dietrich Schwang	28	0.0				
Informal votes		2,409			1,742		
Total valid votes		166,797			167,464		
Turnout		169,206	75.3	▲0.1			
SPD hold	Majority	20,720	12.4	▲9.8			

=== 2017 election ===
Federal election (2017): Kaiserslautern
Notes:	Blue background denotes the winner of the electorate vote. Pink background denotes a candidate elected from their party list. Yellow background denotes an electorate win by a list member, or other incumbent. A ✓ or ✗ denotes status of any incumbent, win or lose respectively.						
Party	Candidate	Votes	%	±%	Party votes	%	±%
SPD	✓ Gustav Herzog	57,482	33.9	▼4.6	47,986	28.3	▼4.4
CDU	Xaver Jung	53,022	31.3	▼5.9	49,400	29.1	▼6.8
AfD	Stefan Scheil	21,378	12.6		23,206	13.7	▲9.2
Left	Alexander Ulrich	12,277	7.2	▼0.2	13,548	8.0	▲0.4
FDP	Achim Oliver Bertram	9,256	5.5	▲3.2	15,519	9.1	▲4.6
Greens	Paul Bunjes	8,618	5.1	▼0.2	11,360	6.7	▼0.5
FW	Günther Mack	4,820	2.8	▲0.2	3,558	2.1	▲0.2
PARTEI	Alexander Mühlmann	2,526	1.5		2,187	1.3	
Pirates					930	0.5	▼2.1
NPD					811	0.5	▼1.4
V-Partei³					529	0.3	
BGE					355	0.2	
ÖDP					343	0.2	0.0
MLPD					32	0.0	0.0
Informal votes		2,937			2,552		
Total valid votes		169,379			169,764		
Turnout		172,316	75.2	▲5.0			
SPD hold	Majority	4,460	2.6	▲1.3			

=== 2013 election ===
Federal election (2013): Kaiserslautern
Notes:	Blue background denotes the winner of the electorate vote. Pink background denotes a candidate elected from their party list. Yellow background denotes an electorate win by a list member, or other incumbent. A ✓ or ✗ denotes status of any incumbent, win or lose respectively.						
Party	Candidate	Votes	%	±%	Party votes	%	±%
SPD	✓ Gustav Herzog	61,253	38.5	▲4.0	52,242	32.7	▲5.0
CDU	Xaver Jung	59,086	37.2	▲4.3	57,376	35.9	▲7.7
Left	Alexander Ulrich	11,813	7.4	▼6.5	12,107	7.6	▼6.6
Greens	Felicitas Flörchinger	8,446	5.3	▼1.5	11,430	7.1	▼1.6
Pirates	Johannes Merkert	4,810	3.0		4,278	2.7	▲0.5
FW	Manfred Petry	4,145	2.6		3,031	1.9	
NPD	Klaus Alfons Gras	3,953	2.5	▼0.1	3,080	1.9	▼0.1
FDP	Christian Kopp	3,584	2.3	▼7.0	7,315	4.6	▼9.7
AfD					7,101	4.4	
FAMILIE	Anette Sabine Metzger	1,896	1.2				
REP					580	0.4	▼0.5
Party of Reason					535	0.3	
PRO					415	0.3	
ÖDP					323	0.2	▼0.1
MLPD					55	0.0	0.0
Informal votes		4,024			3,142		
Total valid votes		158,986			159,868		
Turnout		163,010	70.2	▲0.7			
SPD hold	Majority	2,167	1.3	▼0.5			

=== 2009 election ===
Federal election (2009): Kaiserslautern
Notes:	Blue background denotes the winner of the electorate vote. Pink background denotes a candidate elected from their party list. Yellow background denotes an electorate win by a list member, or other incumbent. A ✓ or ✗ denotes status of any incumbent, win or lose respectively.						
Party	Candidate	Votes	%	±%	Party votes	%	±%
SPD	✓ Gustav Herzog	55,070	34.6	▼9.7	44,362	27.7	▼11.2
CDU	Xaver Jung	52,311	32.8	▼2.5	45,212	28.2	▼1.3
Left	Alexander Ulrich	22,205	13.9	▲5.7	22,670	14.2	▲5.4
FDP	Brigitta Röthig-Wentz	14,725	9.2	▲4.3	22,932	14.3	▲3.9
Greens	Dirk Just	10,834	6.8	▲2.5	13,936	8.7	▲1.6
Pirates					3,421	2.1	
NPD	Sascha Wagner	4,143	2.6	▼0.2	3,197	2.0	▼0.3
FAMILIE					2,074	1.3	▼0.1
REP					1,373	0.9	▼0.4
PBC					414	0.3	▼0.1
ÖDP					406	0.3	
DVU					132	0.1	
MLPD					55	0.0	0.0
Informal votes		4,062			3,166		
Total valid votes		159,288			160,184		
Turnout		163,350	69.5	▼7.0			
SPD hold	Majority	2,759	1.8	▼7.2			

=== 2005 election ===
Federal election (2005):Kaiserslautern
Notes:	Blue background denotes the winner of the electorate vote. Pink background denotes a candidate elected from their party list. Yellow background denotes an electorate win by a list member, or other incumbent. A ✓ or ✗ denotes status of any incumbent, win or lose respectively.						
Party	Candidate	Votes	%	±%	Party votes	%	±%
SPD	✓ Gustav Herzog	77,325	44.2	▼5.6	68,201	38.9	▼5.8
CDU	Walter Altherr	61,781	35.3	▼1.2	51,844	29.6	▼3.8
Left	Alexander Ulrich	14,464	8.3	▲6.6	15,397	8.8	▲7.6
FDP	Hans Kalthoff	8,687	5.0	▼1.9	18,237	10.4	▲1.8
Greens	Andreas Hartebfels	7,596	4.3	▼0.7	12,369	7.1	▼0.6
NPD	Hermann Lautenbach	5,922	2.8		3,971	2.3	▲1.5
Familie					2,520	1.4	
REP					2,176	1.2	▼0.2
PBC					544	0.3	0.0
MLPD					151	0.1	
Informal votes		4,905			4,270		
Total valid votes		174,775			175,410		
Turnout		179,680	76.5	▼0.8			
SPD hold	Majority	15,544	8.9				
