= Weilerbach =

- Municipality
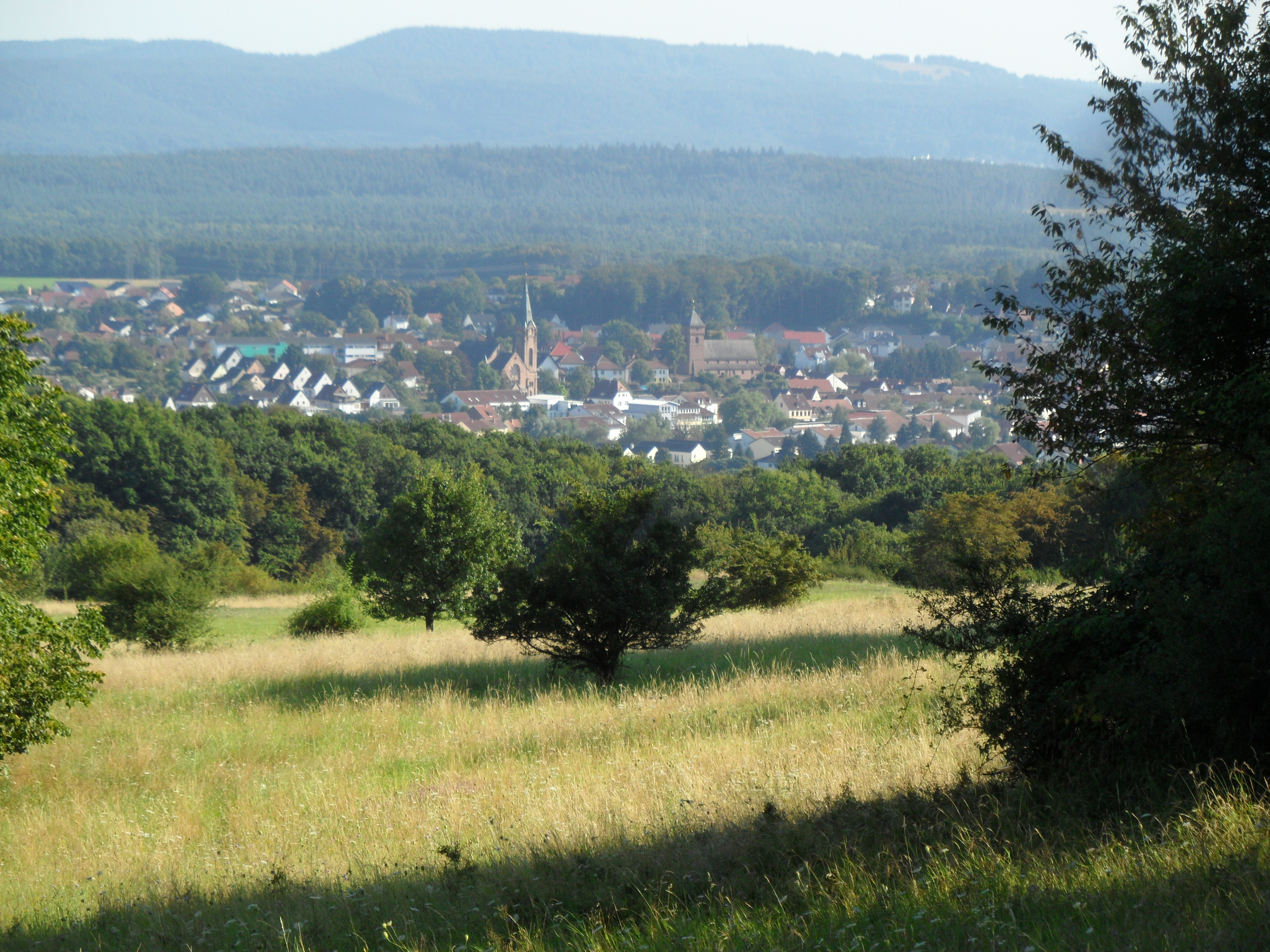
- Weilerbach

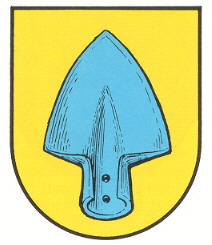
- Coat of arms

- Location of Weilerbach within Kaiserslautern district
- Interactive map of Weilerbach
- Location within Germany Location within Rhineland-Palatinate
- Coordinates: 49°28′53″N 7°37′56″E
- Country: Germany
- State: Rhineland-Palatinate
- District: Kaiserslautern
- Municipal assoc.: Weilerbach

Government
  - Mayor (2019–24): Horst Bonhagen (SPD)

Area
  - Total: 15.99 km^{2} (6.17 sq mi)
- Elevation: 241 m (791 ft)

Population (2025-12-31)
  - Total: 4,501
  - Density: 281.5/km^{2} (729.1/sq mi)
- Time zone: UTC+01:00 (CET)
  - Summer (DST): UTC+02:00 (CEST)
- Postal codes: 67685
- Dialling codes: 06374
- Vehicle registration: KL
- Website: https://www.weilerbach-pfalz.de/

Weilerbach (German pronunciation: [ˈvaɪlɐbax]) is a municipality in the district of Kaiserslautern, in Rhineland-Palatinate, Germany. It is situated approximately 11 km north-west of Kaiserslautern.

Weilerbach is the seat of the Verbandsgemeinde ("collective municipality") Weilerbach (population about 14,500).

== History of the Town ==
=== Founding until 1794 ===
Weilerbach was first mentioned in a document from 1214, in which King Friedrich II gave the right of patronage to his loyal Reinhard von Lautern, knight of Hoheneck, for the parish church at Ramstein with its daughter church in Weilerbach (Wilrebach) und Spesbach (Spethisbach). In 1253, Siegfried von Hoheneck gave these rights and the income therefrom to the Teutonic Order in Kaiserslautern. Pope Alexander IV confirmed in 1258 the Order's possession of Ramstein, Weilerbach, und Spesbach. In 1257, the names Steinmar and Diederich von Weilerbach appear as do the names Hertlin und Theodor von Weilerbach in 1273 as witnesses in documents of the cloister at Lautern and Enkenbach.

Until the end of the 18th Century, Weilerbach belonged to the Electoral Palatinate with its Oberamt in Lautern. Weilerbach was the local court for the towns of Erzenhausen, Eulenbis, Pörrbach, Rodenbach, Schwedelbach, and Weilerbach as well as the hamlets of Atzenhausen (today known as 'Samuelshof'), Einsiedlerhof, Mückenhof and Schellenberg. The court was composed of the village mayor (a 'Schultheiß'), four laypeople ('Schöffe') and a court reporter from Ramstein. The old roads from Kaiserslautern to Kusel and from Zweibrücken to Bingen am Rhein intersected in Weilerbach, causing the establishment of a customs station under the Electoral Palatinate. In 1787, the town had 119 families and 578 inhabitants. The town's buildings included three churches, two parish houses, two school houses, and ninety-three homes.

=== French and Bavarian Administration ===
In 1794, the troops of the French Revolution had overtaken Left Bank of the Rhine. From 1798 to 1814, Weilerbach and the surrounding region belong to the Canton of Kaiserslautern in the Mont-Tonnerre department. Under this French administration, Weilerbach was made into a Mairie, that in addition to the 751-person town of Weilerbach itself, encompassed the neighboring communities of Erfenbach (298 inhabitants), Erzenhausen (386), Rodenbach (322), Siegelbach (293), and Stockborn (63).

Pursuant to agreements made at the Congress of Vienna and the Treaty of Munich (1816) between Bavaria and Austria, the Palatinate was transferred in 1816 to the Kingdom of Bavaria. Under Bavarian administration, Weilerbach remained in the Canton of Kaiserslautern, subpart of the Landkommissariat of Kaiserslautern that in 1862 was renamed to the Bezirksamt Kaiserslautern within the Circle of the Rhine. In 1837, Weilerbach had 1286 inhabitants of whom 525 were Roman Catholic, 746 were Protestant, and 15 were Mennonite. In 1932, the town of Einsiedlerhof was redistricted from Weilerbach to Kaiserslautern.

== Proposed American Military Hospital ==
The Verbandsgemeinde Weilerbach is the site for a new American hospital intended to replace the Landstuhl Regional Medical Center (LRMC) on the Landstuhl Army Base, in nearby Landstuhl, Germany. The LRMC has been active since 1953; Citing the difficulty of maintaining the aging structure, officials have proposed replacing the LRMC with a new facility. Ground breaking took place in October 2014, and the planned completion date is summer 2020.

=== Controversy ===
In 2008, the Department of Defense approved $400 million to expand and renovate the existing hospital, contingent upon congressional support for the funding. In 2010, the proposal was changed to total replacement and relocation from Landstuhl to Weilerbach, with increased funding of up to US$1.2 billion. Both plans were met with some opposition, both within the US and in Germany. Congressional leaders and Pentagon officials have questioned the need and costs of the new hospital, in light of the reduction of forces in Germany, the withdrawal of troops from Iraq, and the reduction of the military presence in Afghanistan. Some Germans who deem the wars in Iraq and Afghanistan illegal and are opposed to continued US military presence in Germany consider the significant financial commitment to medical facilities to imply an intention for long-term occupation. Concerns about deforestation at the new site, as well as potential for groundwater pollution have also been expressed. The suggested removal of the hospital from Landstuhl has led to concerns that the economy of Landstuhl will suffer.

A different view is that a new hospital would be advantageous to the local economy; it would stimulate the state's building industry, with estimates of putting up to one billion U.S. dollars into the local economy over the long term.

=== Scope of the new facilities ===
The proposed new hospital would combine the medical facilities from nearby Ramstein Air Base, and the existing LRMC hospital into one co-located medical center. The LRMC provides treatment for more than 245,000 U.S. military personnel and their families within the European Command. LRMC is also the evacuation and treatment center for all injured U.S. service members and contractors as well as members of 44 coalition forces serving in Afghanistan, Iraq, as well as Africa Command, Central Command, European Command and Pacific Command. The German government had to answer parliamentary inquiries and questions from journalists regarding the planned BSL-3 laboratory, explaining that the lab's purpose would not be experimental research but screening patients for pathogens.

== Transport ==
- Local public transport is integrated in the public transportation network Verkehrsverbund Rhein-Neckar (VRN). Busses connect Weilerbach to Kaiserslautern and Ramstein-Miesenbach.
- The municipality of Weilerbach is linked to the Autobahn A6 (interchange: Kaiserslautern-West).
- From 1914 to 1972, Weilerbach was connected to the rail network via the so-called Bachbahn, a local railway system, which led from Lampertsmühle-Otterbach station to Weilerbach and from 1920 to Reichenbach-Steegen. The station was located in the center of Weilerbach and had a reception building as well as a 68.3-meter-long ramp on the opposite side. The platform length was 150 meters. There was a 205-meter-long loading track in the ramp area in the 1950s. Immediately west of the station building and the platform, there was a 60-meter-long siding. Among other things, slaughter animals were loaded at the station and transported by train to the slaughterhouse at Kaiserslautern Westbahnhof. In the 1980s, Weilerbach was officially only a connecting point. At that time, the track systems no longer allowed locomotives to be turned around, so trains had to travel to Reichenbach for this procedure, even though the freight traffic there had come to a standstill. It was not until the end of the 1980s that a corresponding switch was installed in Weilerbach, allowing the rear part of the route to be decommissioned. At the same time, the station had received a new facility for loading grain, as the freight volume had temporarily increased. Until its final decommissioning, Weilerbach was served by a transfer trip to Lauterecken on the way back.

== Twin cities ==
- Kingsbridge, United Kingdom
- Isigny-sur-Mer, France
- Gatonde, Rwanda
