= Bunjes =

Bunjes is a surname. It may refer to:

- Andrea Bunjes (born 1976), German hammer thrower
- Carolina Bunjes (1918–2016), Dutch photographer
- Paul Bunjes (born 1994), German politician
