= Rodenbach Sculpture Way =

The Rodenbach Sculpture Way (German: Skulpturenweg Rodenbach) is a three-kilometre-long path through the Reichswald forest near Rodenbach in the county of Kaiserslautern in the German state of Rhineland-Palatinate.

== Project description ==
The Rodenbach sculpture trail is part of the hiking trail network of the collective municipality of Weilerbach. It begins at Dorfweiher and runs along the nature reserve to the old Steige (climbing trail). Along the path there are 19 sculptures or groups of sculptures.

=== History ===
In 1991, the municipality of Rodenbach invited schoolgirls from the stone sculpturing class of the German "master school" (Meisterschule) in Kaiserslautern to create a sculpture trail in Rodenbach. Head teachers, departmental schoolteachers and sponsors helped to realise the project. As a theme for the works, motives related to the local area were chosen: water or Celtic history. In 2003, the sculptor, Ludwig Grub, who had lived in Rodenbach for many years, created the Summstein ("humming rock"), (Sculpture Way, Pos. 2) and the Rodenbacher Tümpelkriecher ("Rodenbach puddle creeper") on the village pond, (Sculpture Way, Pos. 3); as well as the well in Rathausstraße for which old cattle troughs were used.

== Works on Sculpture Way (selection) ==
- Martin Blank : Aufsteigend – Absteigend, 1991 - (Pos. 1)
- Ludwig Grub : Summstein, 2003 - (Pos. 2)
- Irene Mürdter : Wasser reißt und rundet, 1991 - (Pos. 4)
- Steffi Glandorf : Wasserbläser, 1991 - (Pos. 6)
