= Rodenbach, Rhineland-Palatinate =

Rodenbach
- Municipality
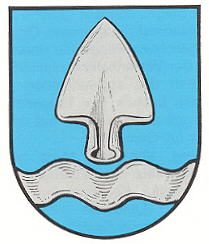
- Coat of arms

- Location of Rodenbach within Kaiserslautern district
- Interactive map of Rodenbach
- Location within Germany Location within Rhineland-Palatinate
- Coordinates: 49°28′25″N 7°39′06″E
- Country: Germany
- State: Rhineland-Palatinate
- District: Kaiserslautern
- Municipal assoc.: Weilerbach

Government
  - Mayor (2019–24): Ralf Schwarm (SPD)

Area
  - Total: 13.74 km^{2} (5.31 sq mi)
- Elevation: 221 m (725 ft)

Population (2025-12-31)
  - Total: 3,338
  - Density: 242.9/km^{2} (629.2/sq mi)
- Time zone: UTC+01:00 (CET)
  - Summer (DST): UTC+02:00 (CEST)
- Postal codes: 67688
- Dialling codes: 06374
- Vehicle registration: KL

Rodenbach (German pronunciation: [ˈʁoːdn̩bax]) is a municipality in the district of Kaiserslautern, in Rhineland-Palatinate, Germany. It belongs to the Verbandsgemeinde Weilerbach.

== Geography ==
Rodenbach lies 9 km (5.6 mi) northwest of Kaiserslautern. The settlements of Am Tränkwald, Berghof, Forsthaus Rodenbach, Mückenhof, and Wasserhaus all belong to Rodenbach's administrative area. Neighboring localities are Weilerbach, Kaiserslautern-Siegelbach, Mackenbach and Kaiserslautern-Einsiedlerhof.

Rodenbach's weather is characterized by a temperate climate.

== Sights ==
In 1874, what was known to locals as the "fox hill" was revealed to be the grave of a member of the Celtic nobility from the La Tène culture around 400 BC. Known today as the Fürstengrab von Rodenbach or the Princely Grave of Rodenbach, the tomb was restored and reconstructed in 2000 for the towns 700th birthday and contains replicas of the original finds, which are housed today in the Historical Museum of the Palatinate in Speyer. A short distance away, the remains of an open-air court from the 15th century can be found.

The area is also home to the Rodenbach Sculpture Way that begins at Dorfweiher and continues for 3 km through the Reichswald forest.
