= Matthias Mieves =

German politician (born 1985)

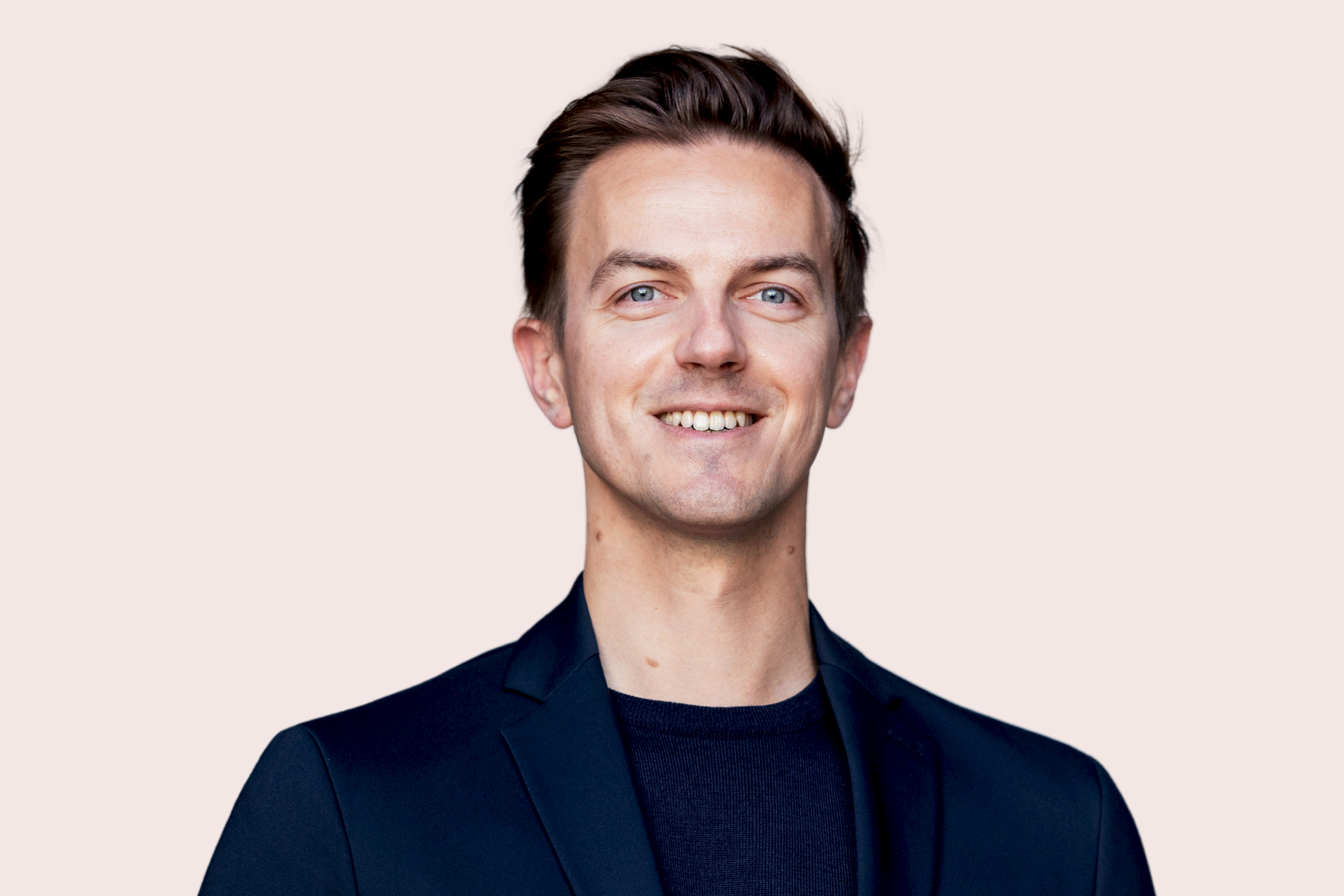
- Mieves in 2023

Member of the Bundestag
- Incumbent
- Assumed office 2021

Personal details
- Born: 30 December 1985 (age 40) Zweibrücken, West Germany (now Germany)
- Party: SPD
- Education: University of Mannheim; University of Sydney; Pontifical Catholic University of Peru

Matthias David Mieves (born 30 December 1985) is a German politician of the Social Democratic Party (SPD) who has been serving as a member of the Bundestag since 2021.

== Early life and education ==
Mieves was born 1985 in the West German town of Zweibrücken. On a scholarship of the Hans-Böckler-Stiftung, he studied business administration.

== Political career ==
Mieves was elected directly to the Bundestag in 2021, representing the Kaiserslautern district. In parliament, he has since been serving on the Health Committee and the Committee on Digital Affairs. In this capacity, he is his parliamentary group's rapporteur on digitizing Germany's health system.

In the negotiations to form a Grand Coalition under the leadership of Friedrich Merz's Christian Democrats (CDU together with the Bavarian CSU) and the SPD following the 2025 German elections, Mieves was part of the SPD delegation in the working group on health, led by Karl-Josef Laumann, Stephan Pilsinger and Katja Pähle.

== Other activities ==
- German United Services Trade Union (ver.di), Member (since 2004)
