= Reich Settlement Law =

The Reich Settlement Law (German: Reichssiedlungsgesetz) is a German law passed by the Weimar National Assembly in July 1919.

The law was drafted by government adviser Max Sering. He declared that the purpose of the law was not to "smash up the large estates" but to foster a "healthy mixture" of small, medium and large farms. Under the law reclaimed land and public land were to be provided for farming. More controversially the law also included a clause that ordered that in districts where estates of at least 100 hectares made up more than 10% of farmland, a third of their land should be made available. This was dubbed the "Baltic Third" (baltische Drittel) and originated in the promise made by the Baltic aristocracy in 1915 to give a third of their land to the government for resettlement, with modest compensation. However, the power of the Junkers meant that only approximately a quarter of this land was surrendered to the government. The law did not significantly alter the ownership structure of German agriculture. During the period 1919–1933 57,000 new farmers were settled on just over 600,000 hectares of land.

According to Alexander Gerschenkron, with the passing of the law "a momentous decision was taken. German democracy rejected the road of agrarian revolution, the road traveled by most of the countries in which the economic power of large estate owners was curbed after the World War. Germany chose the way of gradual reform. Translated into the realistic language of practical politics, this meant that the Junkers had been saved again".
