= Kreimbach-Kaulbach =

- Municipality
- Coat of arms

- Location of Kreimbach-Kaulbach within Kusel district
- Interactive map of Kreimbach-Kaulbach
- Location within Germany Location within Rhineland-Palatinate
- Coordinates: 49°33′06″N 7°37′50″E
- Country: Germany
- State: Rhineland-Palatinate
- District: Kusel
- Municipal assoc.: Lauterecken-Wolfstein

Government
  - Mayor (2019–24): Werner Gillmann

Area
  - Total: 9.05 km^{2} (3.49 sq mi)
- Elevation: 220 m (720 ft)

Population (2025-12-31)
  - Total: 722
  - Density: 79.8/km^{2} (207/sq mi)
- Time zone: UTC+01:00 (CET)
  - Summer (DST): UTC+02:00 (CEST)
- Postal codes: 67757
- Dialling codes: 06308
- Vehicle registration: KUS

Kreimbach-Kaulbach is an Ortsgemeinde – a municipality belonging to a Verbandsgemeinde, a kind of collective municipality – in the Kusel district in Rhineland-Palatinate, Germany. It belongs to the Verbandsgemeinde Lauterecken-Wolfstein.

== Geography ==
=== Location ===
The municipality lies on the river Lauter (also called the Waldlauter, to distinguish it from other rivers in German-speaking Europe named Lauter), southeast of the Königsberg in the North Palatine Uplands. Kreimbach lies on the river's right bank at an elevation of some 198 m above sea level near where the namesake brook, the Kreimbach, flowing by from the northeast, empties into the Lauter. The flat lands before the slopes leading up the Kreimberg (390 m) and the Kreimbacher Kalmit (408 m) together with the Leisberghügel (hill) are broader than the Kaulbach floodplain on the left bank because the lower end of the Kreimbach cuts through them, coming from the east. The Kreimberg is "torn up" on its south side by a great hard-stone quarry covering some 44.4 ha. On the heights above the Kaulbach railway station, which has been out of service since late 2000, once lay within Kreimbach's limits a smaller quarry, one that yielded sandstone, but this was given up even before the First World War. Another, bigger one was to be found on the Winterbach, which was shut down in the 1980s. It was from this pit that the stone for both the local churches was drawn, as well as for the old Kaulbach schoolhouse and, at least for a considerable amount of the work, for the reconstruction of Alexander's Church (Alexanderskirche) in Zweibrücken after the Second World War. Both Kreimbach's and Kaulbach's southern limits touch Kaiserslautern. Above the quarries north of the Kreimbach, spreading across a high plateau, is the Heidenburg ("Heathen Castle"), a prehistoric refuge castle or fortified living area where a tall lookout tower also stands. Kaulbach lies on the lower reaches of its own namesake brook, the Kaulbach, on the Waldlauter's left bank. The Waldlauter thus runs between both the main centres, flowing in a great bow as it passes. Kaulbach arose on a rather small floodplain between the mouth of the Kaulbach and the bank of the Lauter. The geological setting points to long forsaken quarries, a sandstone quarry south of the Kaulbach and to the west a melaphyre quarry. The sedimentary rock was used mainly for building houses, while the volcanic rock was mainly used for building roads and railways. The municipal area measures 904 ha, of which 434 ha is cropland and meadows, 5 ha is open water and 355 ha is wooded. Of the total, 372 ha is Kreimbach's.

=== Neighbouring municipalities ===
Kreimbach-Kaulbach borders in the north on the town of Wolfstein, in the east on the municipality of Niederkirchen, in the southeast on the municipality of Olsbrücken, in the south on the municipality of Frankelbach, in the west on the municipality of Rothselberg and in the northwest on the municipality of Rutsweiler an der Lauter.

=== Constituent communities ===
Kreimbach-Kaulbach's Ortsteile are, of course, Kreimbach and Kaulbach, but also belonging to Kreimbach-Kaulbach are the outlying homesteads of Wallackerhof and Palatia-Mälzerei. The latter's name identifies it as a malthouse.

=== Municipality's layout ===
Both the municipality's constituent communities have generally grown together to form a single residential area, although the village still clearly bears the marks of the former separateness. The Kreimbach floodplain is a major living area, explaining why this "half" of the village has a greater population figure. The brook and the railway line, too, stand between the village's two centres even today. There were once two railway stations, one in the north for Kreimbach and another in the south for Kaulbach. Since then, however, Deutsche Bahn AG has closed these two stations and built a single one for both centres. Unlike the railway, the through road cuts across the bow in the river Lauter and leads straight through the Ortsteil of Kaulbach. The floor of the dale lies at an elevation of roughly 200 m above sea level, while each end of the village, lying in side valleys, reach some 210 m above sea level. Each of the two centres still has its own village core, each one characterized by compact building made up of houses from the 19th century. While Kaulbach has opened two new building areas and is getting set to open a third, Kreimbach has only one small one. Given this, the two centres may eventually become more alike in size.

== History ==
=== Antiquity ===
History has unfolded much the same way for the two constituent communities. Important for Kreimbach are Celtic and Roman times, roughly from 800 BC to AD 400. According to Ernst Christmann, the Celts built a refuge castle on the Kreimberg plateau for times of discord and war, with a stone ringwall standing as its main feature. Enemies thus had to fight hard, uphill. Preserved from this time are an animal figure and a lance tip, as well as urns from both early and late La Tène times, now kept at the historical Museum of the Palatinate in Speyer. From this time comes the name "Heidenburg" ("Heathen Mountain") for the upper part of the Kreimberg. The Romans largely first took over the Celtic holding about 50 BC. Recalling their time in power is the Roman road. Only once the Romans found themselves more and more beset by Germanic tribes, foremost among these the Alemanni, did they undertake to expand the plateau fortifications in the latter half of the 3rd century with walls, gates, palisades and a watchtower. The Heidenburg is thus believed to be the former foundations of a Roman castrum. Building blocks (one with a centaur figure) from a way knocked through a wall in the dale and finds of stones in the Heidenburg area are of the same material and thereby confirm that the stone was quarried from the dale. In the 1990s, extensive archaeological digs were undertaken that unearthed many finds, such as pots (and potsherds) and coins on the Kreimberg plateau. The foundations that were brought to light were photographed, measured and mapped, only to be buried again to keep "collectors" from marring them. About the middle of the 4th century, likely after yet another Germanic invasion, the complex was destroyed. It may, however, of necessity have been repaired, at least partly, bearing witness to which are coins found there from the time about 400. The museum in Speyer keeps a complete smithy facility from the Heidenburg area with more than 40 tools. On the plateau's west side, local history lovers built a small lookout tower in the 19th century out of scattered stones from the castle. It offers a view of the Lauter valley and the Königsberg-Selberg area. A club, the Heidenburgverein, keeps the castle in order. Its financial foundation during hiking season is a small inn and a roofed dancing area. After the Romans withdrew, according to Christmann, the Huns swept through the region – it was the second time – and what they left behind was a land virtually bereft of people. Frankish settlers first came to the Lauter valley, after having occupied the Glan valley, beginning about 600. Permanent settlement, though, only goes back to sometime in the 9th to 11th centuries, according to Christmann, and then beginning on the Lauter's left bank (Kaulbach), although this had already been the site of Saint Michael's Chapel (Michaelskapelle), a meeting point for worshippers from all the places with names ending in —weiler up and down the river. From the left bank, the settlement spread out into farms laid out on the parts of the riverside flats over on the right bank that were not threatened by flooding. Professor Christmann himself found in his own home village, Kaulbach, the oldest signs yet of human habitation from the New Stone Age on the hill still known today as Staane Mann (dialectal German for "Stone Man"; it would be Steinerner Mann in Standard High German) in the form of three great remnant pieces of a menhir with an estimated age of between 3,000 and 4,000 years. Christmann supposes that the stones were broken up and then used to weight harrows. The people of this time, the "Great Stone People" or "Megalith People" (Christmann uses the German name Großsteinleute, but with quotation marks) seem to have disappeared utterly, and nothing is otherwise known about them. After the Romans withdrew, the Germanic peoples left behind fell victim to the Huns. All those who were not killed fled. The land was emptied of people, which shows up in the archaeological gap between 400 and 500. Then came the land-seeking Frankish clans up from the Rhine through the Nahe, Glan and Lauter valleys.

=== Middle Ages ===
The Franks reached the Lauter valley in the 7th and 8th centuries, founding their "—weiler villages": Lohnweiler, Reckweiler, Oberweiler, Rutsweiler. Christmann puts Kaulbach's beginnings sometime in the 9th to 11th centuries. According to him, the first settlement lay near the so-called Hanauer Hof (a name stemming from "Hagenau", Hag meaning "wood" and the ending having the same root as the Modern German word Aue – "floodplain"), where a house stands today, named "Hof-Hannickels". This Hof – "farm" or "estate", that is to say – belonged to the Benedictine monastery founded in Offenbach in 1150. The local settlers – and earlier those from the local area – had a "Frankish-heathen" place of worship out of which later grew Saint Michael's Chapel. All together, the two centres of Kreimbach and Kaulbach lay within the so-called Reichsland ("Imperial Land") or Königsland ("King's Land") around Kaiserslautern for a long time, until, beginning in the 14th century it was pledged to a series of lordships, one after the other, with the two villages first passing to the County of Veldenz with the Prince-Archbishopric of Trier, although by the mid 15th century, they had become Electoral Palatinate holdings. These pledgings and further pledgings more or less match the ones that characterize Wolfstein's history; it, after all, was the seat of an Electoral Palatinate Amt to which Kreimbach and Kaulbach also belonged. They also shared much of their history with their former court seat, Rothselberg. In 1309, Kreimbach had its first documentary mention, while Kaulbach had its in 1281.

=== Modern times ===
Over the next few centuries, Kreimbach's and Kaulbach's history unfolded in markedly dull fashion. Indeed, no chronicler noted anything that could be called spectacular. About the middle of the 16th century, the villages were pledged to the County of Sickingen, and then in the mid 17th century to the House of Palatinate-Simmern. By the mid 18th century, they belonged to Electoral Palatinate, and did until feudal times ended in the French Revolution. In the villages' general upward development, there were from time to time great setbacks, such as the Thirty Years' War and French King Louis XIV's wars of conquest, notably the Nine Years' War (known in Germany as the Pfälzischer Erbfolgekrieg, or War of the Palatine Succession). Steady upward growth set in once again only in the early 18th century.

==== Recent times ====
At the time of the French Revolutionary and Napoleonic annexation, Kreimbach and Kaulbach both belonged to the Mairie ("Mayoralty") of Rothselberg, the Canton of Wolfstein, the Arrondissement of Kaiserslautern and the Department of Mont-Tonnerre (or Donnersberg in German), whose seat was at Mainz. After Napoleon's defeat and the Congress of Vienna, yet another new territorial order came into force, which saw Kreimbach and Kaulbach grouped into the Kingdom of Bavaria as of 1816. Kaulbach now became the seat of a Bürgermeisterei ("mayoralty"), which was moved to Kreimbach in 1955. Both villages suffered casualties in both world wars. In the First World War, 17 men from Kreimbach fell, while Kaulbach lost 9. In the Second World War, 39 men from Kreimbach were killed, as were 25 from Kaulbach. The most difficult period of post-war development fell into Emil Schäfer's, Otto Scheidt's, Willi Gödtel's and August Scheidt's terms in the Kreimbach mayoral office, while the mayors over in Kaulbach, Ludwig Scheidt, Ernst Hemmer and Klaus Pfleger, faced much the same difficulties at that same time. Klaus Pfleger was later the mayor of the amalgamated municipality of Kreimbach-Kaulbach for 20 years, until 1989. He was forced by mayoral age limit to withdraw from office and was succeeded by Rudi Geiß, who served until 1999. They had significant support from municipal officials Otto Steinhauer and Karlheinz Egerer. On 7 June 1969, the Bürgermeisterei ("Mayoralty") of Kreimbach was dissolved and the two hitherto self-administering municipalities of Kreimbach and Kaulbach were merged into one new one under the name Kreimbach-Kaulbach, an arrangement under which the two Ortsteile barely have any further administrative role.

=== Population development ===
Ernst Christmann drew from the 12 "tax chickens" from Kreimbach that had to be paid to New Wolfstein Castle in 1497 the conclusion that this meant that there were also 12 households there at the time. Being a village of roughly the same size, and assuming four persons to each household, Kaulbach would have had some 50 inhabitants around 1500. Around 1600, Kaulbach had 14 hearths and Kreimbach 15, according to Forest Master Vellmann's description of the Amt of Wolfstein. Even 56 years after the Thirty Years' War, in 1684, Kreimbach's population had still only reached half what it had been before the war. The same dire fate is assumed to have befallen Kaulbach, given that the village lay only just across the river Lauter from Kreimbach. A few lists of Kaulbach inhabitants liable to taxation show about ten for 1706, about fifteen for 1724 and about fifty for 1744. After a drop in population, it had reached back up to 32 by 1795 with some five persons in each family. Kreimbach had roughly 15 hearths (i.e. "households") in 1600. When farmland had become scarce and no longer yielded enough food for the growing population owing to the ongoing hereditary divisions with each generation, emigration began in the mid 18th century, first to the east, and then in the 19th century and the first few decades of the 20th to the west, to the United States. Many of the more recent ties to those abroad manifested themselves in the time of need after 1945 in the form of aid packages from the USA. Also worthy of mention is the Musikantentum – the travelling musician industry – that took hold in the region in the latter half of the 19th century, which saw men from the village – including Ernst Christmann's own father – literally travel worldwide, even to China and Australia, plying their musical trade.

The following tables show population development over the centuries for Kreimbach-Kaulbach, with some figures broken down by religious denomination:

==== Kreimbach ====
The last two columns for Kreimbach show figures for Kreimbach-Kaulbach as a whole, after the two villages' amalgamation.

| Year | 1786 | 1792 | 1806 | 1815 | 1825 | 1835 | 1846 | 1871 | 1900 | 1905 | 1939 | 1961 | 2000 | 2005 |
| Total | 170 | 190 | 236 | 256 | 302 | 353 | 420 | 432 | 540 | 547 | 551 | 620 | 960 | 975 |
| Catholic | | | | | 16 | | | | | | | 57 |
| Evangelical | | | | | 286 | | | | | | | 561 |

==== Kaulbach ====
Figures for the time after 1961 are given in the Kreimbach table above.

| Year | 1786 | 1792 | 1806 | 1815 | 1825 | 1835 | 1846 | 1871 | 1900 | 1905 | 1939 | 1961 |
| Total | 145 | 154 | 160 | 190 | 248 | 300 | 310 | 301 | 340 | 304 | 256 | 326 |
| Catholic | | | | | 43 | | | | | | | 59 |
| Evangelical | | | | | 205 | | | | | | | 289 |

=== Municipality's names ===
==== Kreimbach ====
Professor Dr. Ernst Christmann traced the first syllable of the name back to a form of the German word Krähe ("crow") that has been corrupted over the centuries. This particular kind of bird may have found fruitful nesting grounds along the deep Kreimbach valley with its moist and therefore food-rich riverbanks. Crows also stand as a charge in the municipal coat of arms. The following forms of the name are known from the past: Creynbach (1309), Kreyenbach (1389), Kreymbach (1457), Kreimbach (1597) and Crambach (1643). Since 1828, the only customary form has been Kreimbach.

==== Kaulbach ====
Professor Dr. Ernst Christmann declared that the melaphyre stone west of the village on the north side of the Kaulbach (brook) has the characteristic of weathering into ever rounder shapes, shedding one layer after another, rather like an onion. The villagers' forebears called these rounded stones Kaulen or Kulen, or later even Kugelen (resembling the modern German word for "ball" or "sphere"), thus giving the brook its name, a concept reinforced by many of these Kaulen being found on the brookbed. Kaulbach had its first documentary mention in 1281 as Culebach. Other forms of the name are also known from the past: Kulbach (1345), Kullebach uff der Lauter (1446), Kaulenbach (1560), Coulbach (1580) and Kaulbach (1824).

== Religion ==
The numeric breakdown of denominations after the merger of the two villages of Kreimbach and Kaulbach can only be expressed for the two Ortsteile together. According to older statistics, though, there was a great Evangelical majority in both villages, with a 10% Catholic minority in Kreimbach and a 20% one in Kaulbach. The Protestant church on the Kirchberg ("Church Hill") in Kaulbach stands on the spot once occupied by a pre-Christian place of worship dedicated to Wōden, and later, before the Reformation, it was consecrated to Saint Michael (Wōden is widely identified with Michael). Still preserved is the churchtower, which has a peal of three bells. In the 15th century, the chapel, which by then had fallen into disrepair, was replaced with a small church. By 1862, though, the church, too, had fallen into disrepair and had to be closed. After years of avoiding the matter and of holding church services in a classroom, the church that still stands today was built, and it was consecrated on 15 March 1874. The villagers belonged mainly to the Lutheran Church before the Palatine Union, which saw that church unite with the Calvinists, and they were assigned to the Zweikirche near Wolfstein (Rutsweiler). The seat of the Evangelical parish is nowadays at Rothselberg. Catholics still have to make a five-kilometre trip to Wolfstein to attend church, where indeed their parish seat has been since days of yore. In 1875 however, Pastor Philipp Hammer succeeded in having Saint Mary's Chapel (Marienkapelle) built in the village out of his own personal resources. He also endowed one of the three bells. He is also buried next to the church. Each year on Visitation Day (2 July) and Nativity of Mary (8 September), there are pilgrimages in Kaulbach (see below). Kreimbach has never had its own church.

== Politics ==
=== Municipal council ===
The council is made up of 12 council members, who were elected by proportional representation at the municipal election held on 7 June 2009, and the honorary mayor as chairman.

The municipal election held on 7 June 2009 yielded the following results:

| Year | SPD | WG 1 | WG 2 | Total |
|---|---|---|---|---|
| 2009 | 2 | 8 | 2 | 12 seats |
| 2004 | by majority vote | | | 12 seats |

The "WGs" are voters' groups.

=== Mayor ===
Kreimbach-Kaulbach's mayor is Werner Gillmann.

=== Coat of arms ===
The German blazon reads: In geteiltem Schild oben in Silber rechts auf goldenem Dreiberg ein blaubedachter, gemauerter roter römischer Wachtturm mit goldenem Umgang, links ein rechtsgewendeter wachsender roter Wolf, unten von Rot, darin drei silberne Kugeln, und Silber, darin zwei steigende schwarze Krähen, durch Wellenlinien geteilt.

The municipality's arms might in English heraldic language be described thus: Per fess argent dexter issuant from the line of partition a mount of three Or issuant from which a Roman watchtower masoned sable and roofed of the field with a deck of the second, sinister issuant from the line of partition a wolf rampant gules, and party per fess wavy gules three roundels of the first in fess and argent two crows displayed, beaks to chief, of the third.

Given Kreimbach-Kaulbach's history of being two separate villages then thrust together, it is no surprise that it has a complicated heraldic history. Before the 1969 merger, Kreimbach bore arms with the Roman watchtower as the main charge, but it stood on a flat-topped green hill and had a wooden palisade around it in natural colour ("proper" in heraldry). The deck was also wooden in colour instead of gold. It also bore the two crows, but in sinister and dexter chief (that is, in the upper corners).

Before the merger, Kaulbach, too, bore its own arms. The blazon read as follows: Von Silber und Rot geteilt oben ein wachsender roter Wolf an einem aus dem linken Schildrand hervorbrechenden natürlichen Felsen anspringend, unten ein Schraglinkswellenbalken, belegt mit drei schwarzen Kugeln. This might be rendered in English as: Per fess argent issuant from the line of partition a wolf rampant gules, his paws against a crag proper issuant from the line of partition and dexter, and gules a bend sinister wavy of the first charged with three roundels sable." The "bend sinister wavy" (wavy slanted stripe) represents the brook, while the roundels are a reference to the Kaulen, the rounded stones mentioned above. There had even once been an earlier coat of arms, albeit one never officially adopted. It bore the leaping wolf (a full view, not cut off at the waist) and the crag, with the wolf standing on green ground.

Kreimbach's and Kaulbach's old arms can all be seen at Heraldry of the World.

After the amalgamation of Kreimbach and Kaulbach, a new "amalgamated" coat of arms was approved bearing charges from both former coats, which had themselves been approved less than a decade and a half earlier, in 1955 and 1956. The current coat's composition groups together the wolf charge, the round melaphyre stones and the wave from the old Kaulbach arms, and from the old Kreimbach arms come the Roman castrum (without the palisade and partly in different tinctures) and the two crows.

== Culture and sightseeing ==
=== Buildings ===
The following are listed buildings or sites in Rhineland-Palatinate's Directory of Cultural Monuments:

- Herz-Maria-Wallfahrtskapelle ("Immaculate Heart of Mary Pilgrimage Chapel"), Kapellenweg 31/33 – stone-block building with sacristy and former pilgrims' inn, 1875; Crucifix, Deacon Hammer's grave (see below), stone altar and pulpit
- Protestant church, Bahnhofstraße 3a – Late Gothic quire tower, dendrochronologically dated to about 1490, Gothic Revival sandstone-block aisleless church, 1872–1874, architect Johann Schmeisser, Kusel; characterizes village's appearance
- Lookout tower, north of the village – about 1900, with Roman spolia
- So-called Heidenburg ("Heathen Castle") (monumental zone) – Celtic refuge castle and Late Roman heights settlement; Roman cut stones and relief stones, possibly from about AD 260 or later, cistern

=== Pilgrimage site ===
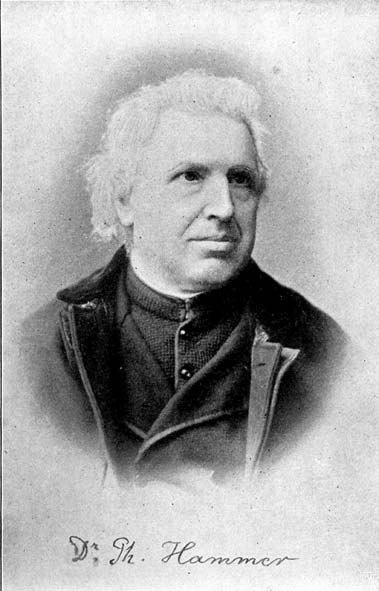
Dr. Philipp Hammer, about 1895

The historically separate village (now Ortsteil) of Kaulbach is among the official pilgrimage sites of the Roman Catholic Diocese of Speyer. On the Kapellenberg ("Chapel Hill") found there on Kapellenweg, the long-serving Wolfstein clergyman Philipp Hammer (see below), who was also a religious writer, endowed the church Maria Hilf ("Mary Help of Christians") in 1875 with the royalties from his books, and he founded a pilgrimage. Dean Hammer, in his time a nationally famous speaker at great Catholic events, lies buried near the chapel. Now and then, his friend from seminary days, Bishop of Trier Michael Felix Korum would show up, either to preach or hold services.

=== Regular events ===
The Kaulbach kermis (church consecration festival, locally known as the Kaulbacher Kerwe) is held in late July. After the Kreimbach kermis was given up, it was replaced with a village festival held yearly in late August, but in Kaulbach rather than Kreimbach. Another folk custom that can be mentioned is the Neujahr-Anschießen (roughly "shooting in the New Year") staged by several children's groups. Cultural events are held mainly at the community hall built in 1976.

=== Clubs ===
Kreimbach-Kaulbach has the following clubs (as of 1997):

- Countrywomen's club
- Fire brigade promotional association
- Fruitgrowing and gardening club
- Heidenburg beautification club
- Kindergarten promotional association
- Men's singing club
- Nursing club
- Shooting club (Schützenverein Kaulbach-Kreimbach 1958 e.V.)
- Sport club (SV 1961 Kaulbach-Kreimbach e.V.)
- Table tennis club (TTC Kreimbach-Kaulbach 1951 e.V.)
- Women's choir

== Economy and infrastructure ==
=== Economic structure ===
Agriculture, once the foremost sector in Kreimbach-Kaulbach's economy, nowadays plays only a subordinate role. One important industrial operation is the Palatia malthouse, which despite its importance does not employ very many people. Still important is the quarry, taken over in 1925 by the Rammelsbach quarrying operations, although likewise this does not employ very many people owing to rationalization and automation. Moreover, a time when the yield will no longer be commercially worthwhile can already be foreseen. Businesses in the village itself include two electrical installation companies, one transport company, two grocery shops, a bakery and a window installation company. The village is also home to many commuters, most of whom work in Kaiserslautern.

=== Education ===
Originally, the pastors taught at the first village schools until eventually trained teachers were hired. In Rothselberg, records show that a school had been established by 1684. Christmann presumed that school was also then being taught in Kaulbach, although schoolteachers for Kaulbach and Kreimbach were only first noted in records in 1717. At first, the schoolteachers taught in private houses. The first actual schoolhouse was built in 1823 for both villages on the site of the former Bohsung inn and distillery. It was sold in 1847, and a successor building arose on the site of the Hanauer Hof. In 1877, a school for Kreimbach only was built, while Kaulbach schoolchildren continued lessons at the existing one-room schoolhouse. Kreimbach got a new schoolhouse in 1892, built next to the existing one so that there could be two classrooms. Over in Kaulbach, a new schoolhouse was built on the Pferdswiese ("Horse's Meadow"). Schooling still took place in Kaulbach in a one-room schoolhouse up until 1950. In 1960, a new school was built in Kreimbach for both Kreimbach and Kaulbach. The municipality had the schoolhouse on the Pferdswiese sold, and it is now used as a private house. The merger of the two schools contributed greatly to the drawing together of the two villages. In all the time until then, each village had steered its own course, not least of all because of the tax revenue that Kaulbach drew from the Palatia malthouse and that drawn by Kreimbach from the stone quarry. This growing together quickly reached the current arrangement with the two villages merged into one municipality. Today, primary school pupils and Hauptschule students attend their respective schools in Wolfstein. The special schools responsible for Kreimbach-Kaulbach are to be found in Lauterecken (Janusz-Korczak-Schule für Lernbehinderte – for children with learning difficulties) and Kusel (Jakob-Muth-Schule für Geistigbehinderte – for children with mental handicaps). The vocational schools in Kusel, too, are responsible for Kreimbach-Kaulbach. The nearest Gymnasien are in Kaiserslautern and Lauterecken, while a Realschule can be found in Kusel.

=== Transport ===
Through the village runs Bundesstraße 270, which links Idar-Oberstein with Pirmasens by way of Kaiserslautern. The nearest Autobahn interchanges are Kaiserslautern-Ost and Kaiserslautern-West, each just under 20 km away. Both Kreimbach and Kaulbach are linked by road to Rothselberg, and onwards to Altenglan and Kusel, as well as the Odenbach valley near Niederkirchen. The Lauter Valley Railway (Lautertalbahn) running through the village is still in service and links Lauterecken-Grumbach with the main railway station in Kaiserslautern, stopping at Kreimbach-Kaulbach station. Formerly, each of the municipality's two constituent villages had its own stop on this line, but Deutsche Bahn AG has since closed both and built a common station for both centres.

== Famous people ==
=== Sons and daughters of the town ===
- Ernst Christmann (born 7 September 1885 in Kaulbach; d. 7 September 1974 in Kaiserslautern) — In his birthplace, Kaulbach, Christmann attended the primary school and first worked at the stone quarry. He joined the Kaiserslautern teacher-training institute in 1899. He was a schoolteacher in Bellheim and Ludwigshafen. In 1907, he began a career at first as a teaching expert at his alma mater, transferring to the Präparandenschule Kusel as a teacher trainer, later beginning studies in 1912 at LMU Munich. In 1916 he became a soldier. After coming home from the First World War and wartime imprisonment, he taught until 1936 as a lecturer at the Kaiserslautern teacher-training institute, where he was named a professor. He also lectured for two years at Heidelberg University. As a full member of the Palatine Society for the Promotion of the Sciences (Pfälzische Gesellschaft zur Förderung der Wissenschaften), he also served two years as secretary-general. Outside his official career, Christmann worked on many scientific projects, among many, Die Siedlungsnamen der Pfalz, a work about Palatine placenames. He won high, and even the highest, distinctions. Many of the English-language Wikipedia articles about municipalities in the Kusel district reference his work. There is also a street named after Christmann in Kaiserslautern.

=== Famous people associated with the municipality ===
- Philipp Hammer (born 1837 in Stein; d. 1901 in Wolfstein) — Hammer was a Catholic theologian, having studied in Innsbruck and been ordained a priest in 1861. He was chaplain in Frankenthal and Speyer, later studying once again and graduating in Innsbruck. In 1863, he was given the pastoral post in Wolfstein, which he held until his death. Hammer was well known for his tough tone, and was nicknamed the "People's Preacher of Wolfstein", representing a strict Catholic viewpoint characterized by loyalty to the Pope. Otto von Bismarck himself sued Hammer for defamation. Of similar character were the contents of several religious-political writings that he published. For Kaulbach, Dr. Hammer became important for bringing about the building of "his" Marienkirche (church), before which he was later buried (see Pilgrimage site above).
