= Aussiedlerhof =

Type of agricultural concern in Germany

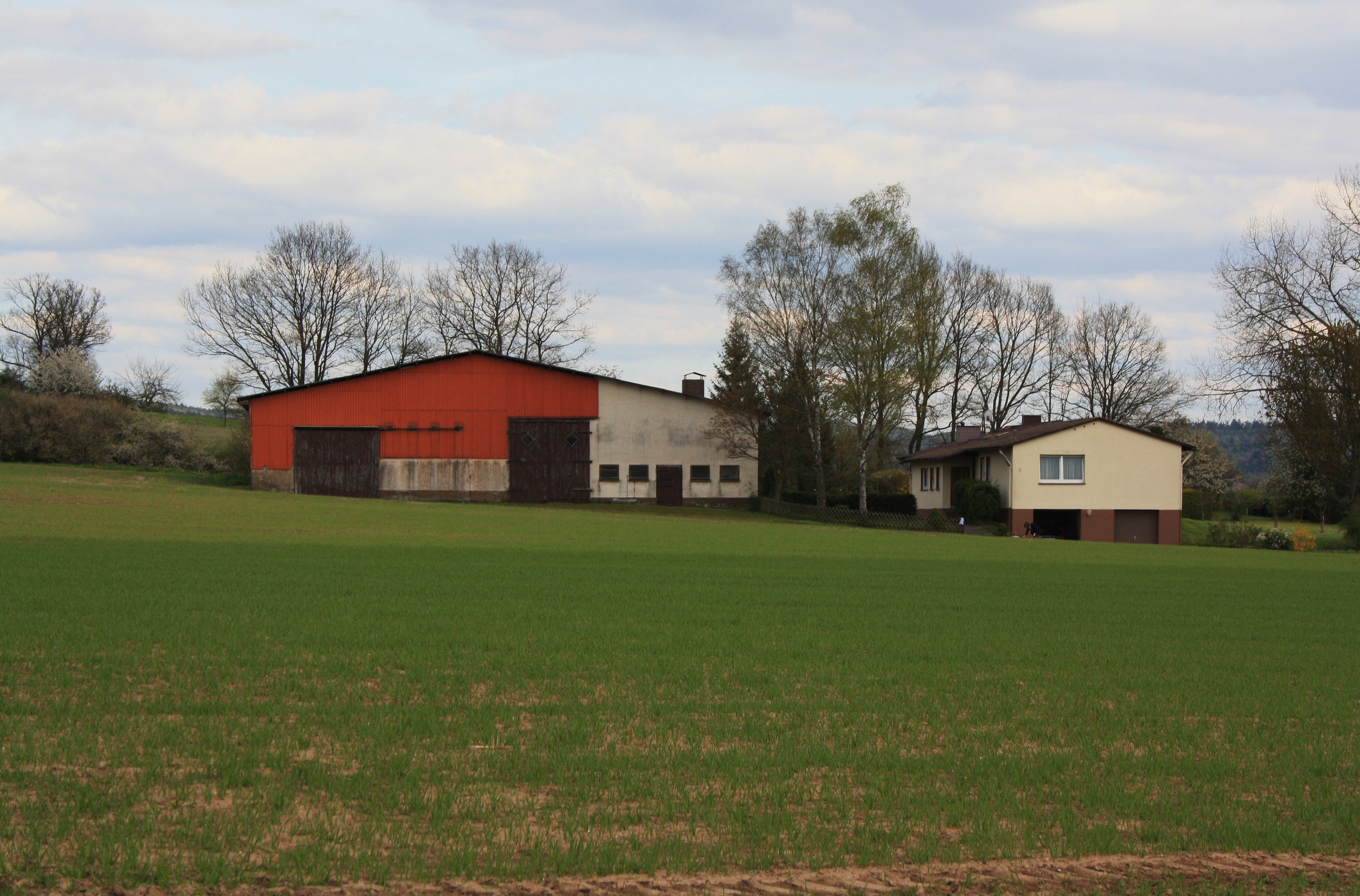
An aussiedlerhof in Hesse. This form is typical of farms relocated as part of a West German, post-war "Green Plan"

An Aussiedlerhof (plural: Aussiedlerhöfe), also called an Aussiedlung (plural: Aussiedlungen) is an agricultural concern in Germany, typically a farm, located outside a village and which has moved away from that village, usually due to a lack of space.

Many aussiedlerhöfe were established in Germany, during the post-war period. Many of these farms are located in the area surrounding a village at some distance from the other buildings. They were usually established by farmers who had originally had their farmyard within the village itself, but had decided as a result of the post-war situation to move away from the heart of the village.

In addition, there were aussiedlungen or partial aussiedlungen, usually due to a lack of space at the existing farmyard, the merging of farming facilities or to resolve problems due to the federal emission control act.

There are several different types of aussiedlerhöfe depending on the region and number of buildings. An Ausbau, also known as Abbau or Abbaue, for example, prevalent in Mecklenburg, Brandenburg, and Pomerania; typically refers to small and newer settlements (19th or 20th century) that are physically disconnected but still part of their respective village, often still carrying it in their name (e. g. Nostorf-Ausbau is an Ausbau of Nostorf).

== History ==
Ideas for improving agricultural production through the appropriate positioning of farms in space ultimately go back to early modern efforts of Landesausbau ("land expansion"), but especially to Prussian internal colonization, as well as to the demands for land reform in Germany. The land companies, which essentially drove the resettlements in the Federal Republic, go back to the Reich Settlement Law of 1919.

== Reasons for the emergence of aussiedlerhöfe ==
Aussiedlerhöfe were mostly founded by farmers who initially had their farms within the village area. The decisive factor for the implementation was the considerable funding and advice from state and state-related institutions. From the state's point of view, given the lack of food and, in part, forced farming, the focus was initially on improving the food supply for the population. Later, in the young Federal Republic, a reduction in import dependency and an increase in domestic exports, including agricultural products, became important. This not only required an increase in quantity, but also a reduction in costs through more efficient technology and operational processes as well as fewer personnel deployments in agriculture. The formation of Aussiedlerhöfe was an instrument for achieving these goals.

From the viewpoint of farmers there were the following reasons for the creation of aussiedlerhöfe:

- In the post-war period, agriculture underwent a consolidation process. For the individual farmers it was necessary to manage more and larger fields than hitherto. Likewise, there was a trend towards increasing stocks of cattle.
- Due to the lack of space within villages, it was not often possible to modernise and enlarge farms within the boundaries of the village.

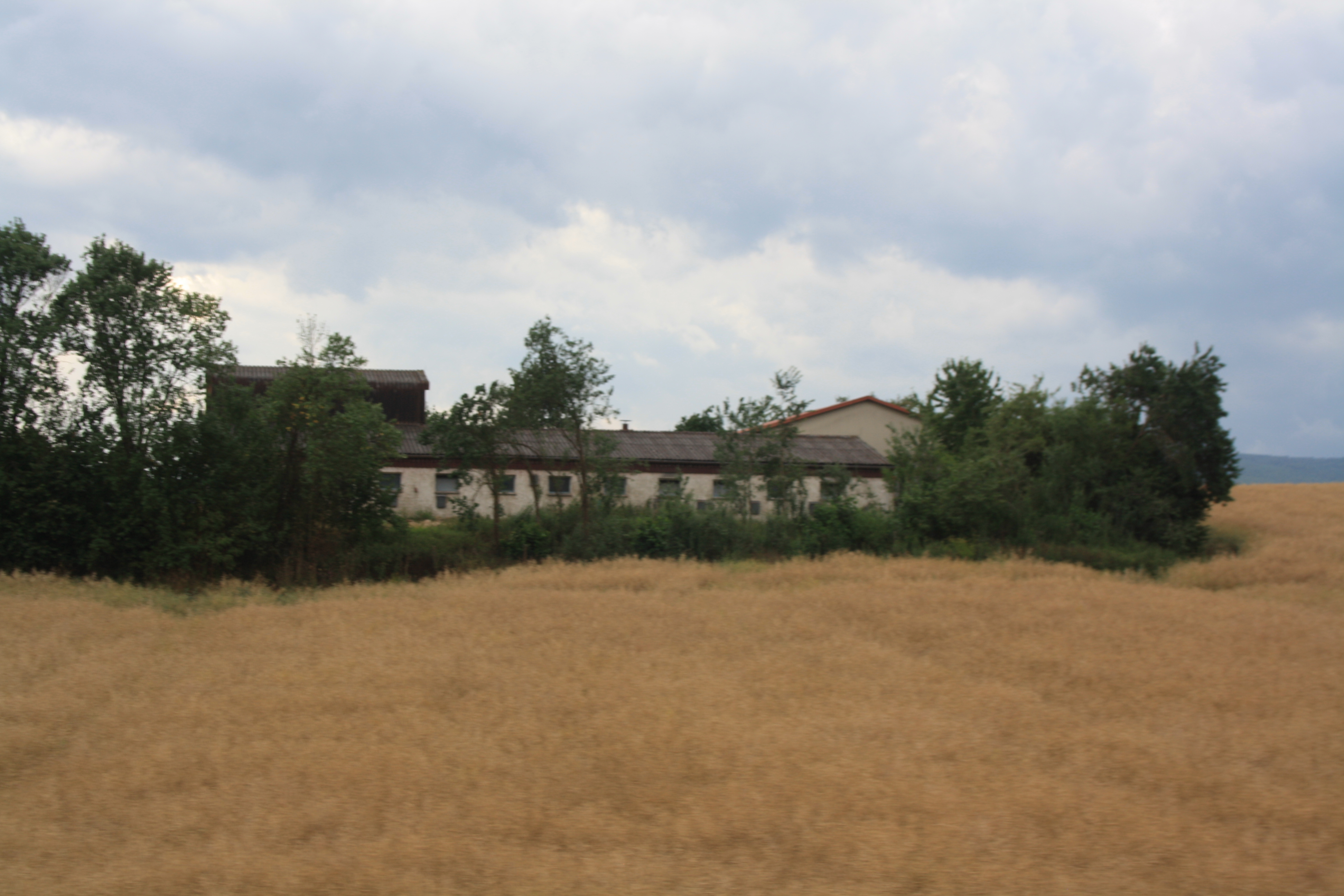
Typical aussiedlerhof in Lower Franconia

From the viewpoint of state regional planning there were reasons to support Aussiedlungen:

- The living standard of the rural population was markedly lower than that of the urban population.
- The condition of agricultural buildings was poor and they lacked infrastructure: in thousands of villages there was neither electrical power nor mains water; at this time there were also no metalled roads in the countryside.
- There was a marked migration from rural areas to the towns.

The aim of post-war spatial planning in West Germany was to create an equivalence of living conditions in all parts of the country. The relocation of farms was one of the means of adapting living conditions in the country to the standards in the city. At the same time, conflict situations between agriculture and neighbouring residential housing could be reduced.

== Legal regulations ==
At the beginning of the 1950s, there were government measures in West Germany to promote relocation. They were directly linked to other measures aimed at improving the agricultural structure, in particular measures for Flurbereinigung.

The 1953 Land Reconciliation Act aimed to increase the competitiveness of agriculture. In the law, there was also the explicit demand for a relaxation of village structures.

The establishment of aussiedlerhöfe is still permissible in areas outside of villages (privileged building projects, cf. § 35 para. 1 of the Construction Act Book – BauGB). Section 35 (4) of the Building Code, however, prescribes space-saving and safe building construction.

== Impact of the aussiedlungen ==
- the social fabric of villages changed and the families that moved out had to adjust to a different way of life.
- With each aussiedlerhof there were costs due to the necessary expansion of infrastructure (connection to the power grid, road access, maintenance of roads, water supply and sewage)
- In the villages themselves, levels of noise, smell and pollution reduced accordingly.
