= Gustav Herzog =

German politician

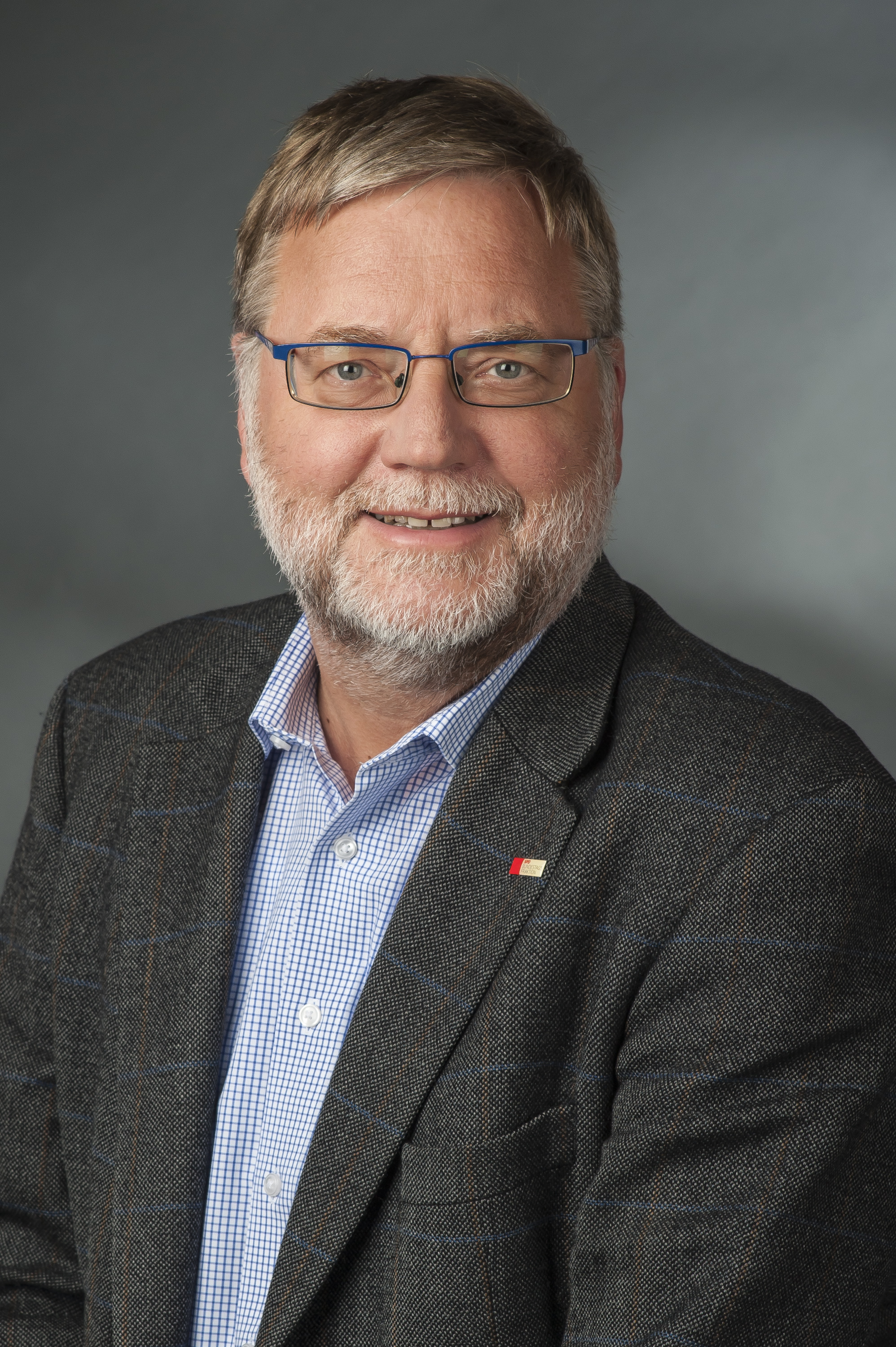
- Gustav Herzog in 2014

Member of the Bundestag
- In office 1998–2021

Personal details
- Born: 11 October 1958 (age 67) Harxheim, West Germany (now Germany)
- Party: SPD

Gustav Herzog (born 11 October 1958) is a German politician of the Social Democratic Party (SPD) who served as a member of the Bundestag from the state of Rhineland-Palatinate from 1998 until 2021.

== Political career ==
Herzog first became a member of the Bundestag in the 1998 German federal election, representing Kaiserslautern. He was a member of the Committee on Transport and Digital Infrastructure and the Committee on Digital Agenda.

In late 2019, Herzog announced that he would not stand in the 2021 federal elections but instead resign from active politics by the end of the parliamentary term.

== Other activities ==
- Federal Network Agency for Electricity, Gas, Telecommunications, Posts and Railway (BNetzA), Member of the Rail Infrastructure Advisory Council (since 2018)
- IG BCE, Member
