= Kollweiler =

- Municipality
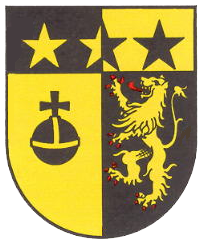
- Coat of arms

- Location of Kollweiler within Kaiserslautern district
- Interactive map of Kollweiler
- Location within Germany Location within Rhineland-Palatinate
- Coordinates: 49°30′57″N 7°35′04″E
- Country: Germany
- State: Rhineland-Palatinate
- District: Kaiserslautern
- Municipal assoc.: Weilerbach

Government
  - Mayor (2024-): Timo Müller (FW)

Area
  - Total: 5.57 km^{2} (2.15 sq mi)
- Elevation: 335 m (1,099 ft)

Population (2025-12-31)
  - Total: 530
  - Density: 95/km^{2} (250/sq mi)
- Time zone: UTC+01:00 (CET)
  - Summer (DST): UTC+02:00 (CEST)
- Postal codes: 66879
- Dialling codes: 06385
- Vehicle registration: KL

Kollweiler (German pronunciation: [ˈkɔlvaɪlɐ]) is a municipality in the district of Kaiserslautern, in Rhineland-Palatinate, western Germany.

== Geography ==
Kollweiler lies in the Northern Pfalz. To the north are the towns of Jettenbach and Rothselberg, and to the south are the towns of Schwedelbach and Reichenbach-Steegen. The closest city is Kaiserslautern, located 15 km (9.3 mi) to the southeast.

== History ==
Even before the Romans, Celtic descendants settled the area around Kollweiler.
