= Eulenbis =

- Municipality
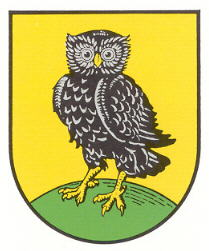
- Coat of arms

- Location of Eulenbis within Kaiserslautern district
- Interactive map of Eulenbis
- Location within Germany Location within Rhineland-Palatinate
- Coordinates: 49°30′27″N 7°38′08″E
- Country: Germany
- State: Rhineland-Palatinate
- District: Kaiserslautern
- Municipal assoc.: Weilerbach

Government
  - Mayor (2019–24): Kathleen Hielscher

Area
  - Total: 3.97 km^{2} (1.53 sq mi)
- Elevation: 385 m (1,263 ft)

Population (2025-12-31)
  - Total: 482
  - Density: 121/km^{2} (314/sq mi)
- Time zone: UTC+01:00 (CET)
  - Summer (DST): UTC+02:00 (CEST)
- Postal codes: 67685
- Dialling codes: 06374
- Vehicle registration: KL
- Website: www.eulenbis.de

Eulenbis is a municipality (German: Ortsgemeinde) in the district of Kaiserslautern, in Rhineland-Palatinate, Germany.

== Geography ==
Eulenbis lies around 13 kilometers northwest of Kaiserslautern. The Eulenkopf to the west has a height of 422 meters, and Eulenbis is the highest part of the greater Weilerbach community.

Additionally, the hamlets of Mückenmühle and Untere Pfeifermühle belong to Eulenbis.

== History ==
The first documented mention of the town as "Ulengebeiß" dates back to the year 1380.

== Politics ==
=== Town council ===
The Eulenbis town council consists of eight members who were last elected on May 26, 2019. Previously made up of 12 members, the council is headed up by a volunteer mayor.

=== Mayor ===
The mayor of Eulenbis is Kathleen Hielscher. She was selected by direct election on May 26, 2019 and received 56.97% of ballots cast. She is the successor to Ulrich Stemler (Free Voters), who did not run for re-election.

=== Coat of arms ===
Emblazoning: "In gold on arched green ground a gold-plated black owl." German: "In Gold auf gewölbtem grünem Boden eine goldbewehrte schwarze Eule."

== Culture and notable sights ==
=== Buildings ===
The Eulenkopfturm (English: "Eulenkopf Tower") has long been known as the symbol of the community and is visible for kilometers thanks to its prominent location above the town. Originally designed as a watch tower, construction on the 19-metre (62 ft) tall tower began on August 24, 1913 and the building was dedicated on 1914.

A local society, the Eulenkopfverein, has maintained the building since its construction. It was renovated from 1951–1952 and again from 1991–1992. In addition to the 12.2 meter-high viewing platform that offers visitors sweeping views of the Palatinate Forest towards the southeast, the tower's ground floor houses the highest Standesamt in the Palatinate.

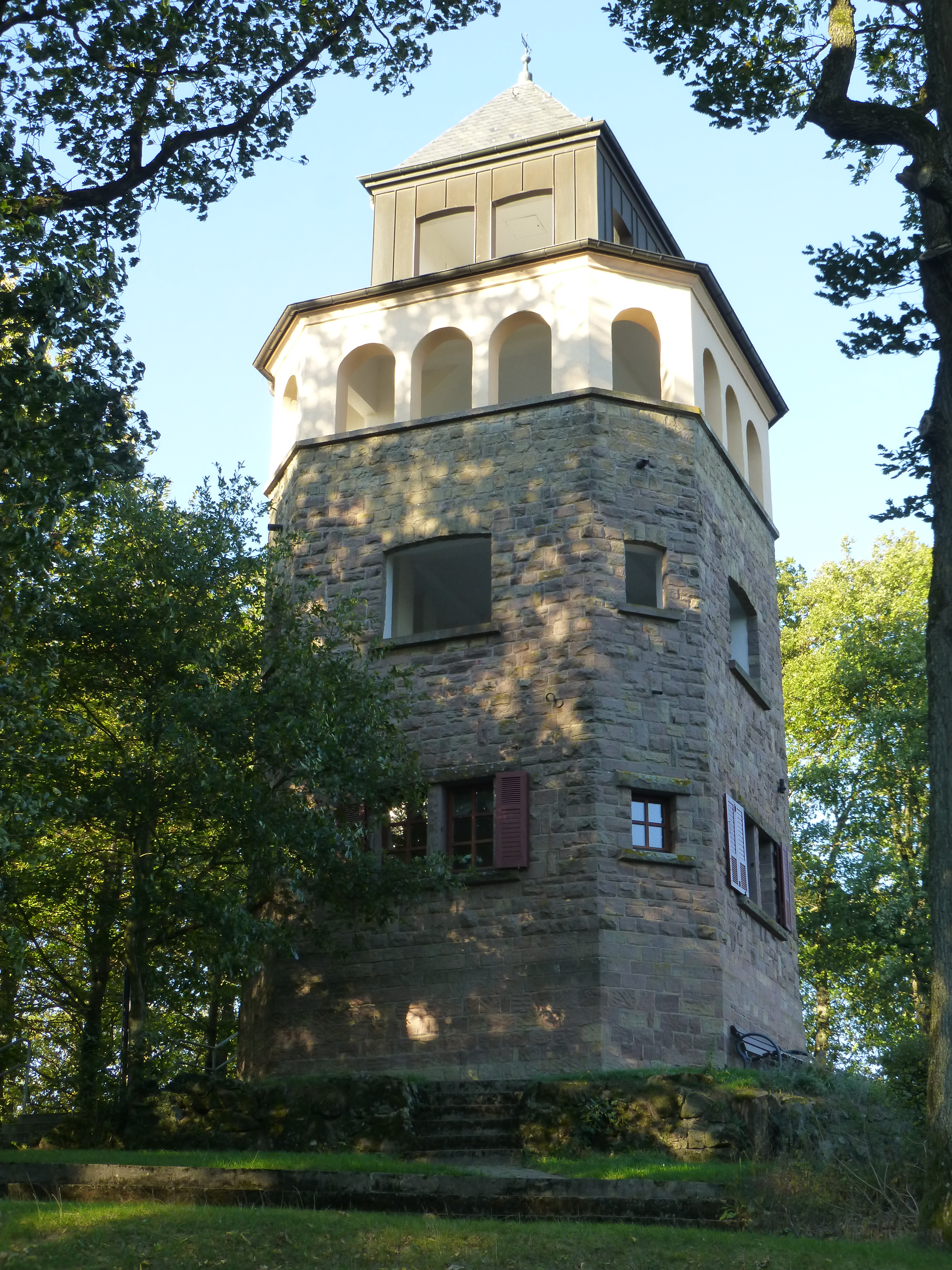
The Eulenkopfturm at Eulenbis

== Economy and infrastructure ==
The nearest motorway is the Bundesautobahn 6.
