= Paul Bunjes =

German politician (born 1994)

Member of the Landtag of Rhineland-Palatinate
- Incumbent
- Assumed office 18 May 2026

Personal details
- Born: 13 October 1994 (age 31)
- Party: Alliance 90/The Greens (since 2011)

Paul Martin Nelson Bunjes (born 13 October 1994) is a German politician who was elected member of the Landtag of Rhineland-Palatinate in 2026. He has served as co-chairman of Alliance 90/The Greens in Rhineland-Palatinate since 2022.
