= Schwedelbach =

- Municipality
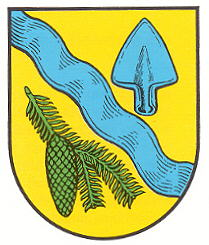
- Coat of arms

- Location of Schwedelbach within Kaiserslautern district
- Interactive map of Schwedelbach
- Location within Germany Location within Rhineland-Palatinate
- Coordinates: 49°29′46″N 7°35′30″E
- Country: Germany
- State: Rhineland-Palatinate
- District: Kaiserslautern
- Municipal assoc.: Weilerbach

Government
  - Mayor (2019–24): Henning Schaumlöffel (SPD)

Area
  - Total: 8.41 km^{2} (3.25 sq mi)
- Elevation: 258 m (846 ft)

Population (2025-12-31)
  - Total: 1,091
  - Density: 130/km^{2} (336/sq mi)
- Time zone: UTC+01:00 (CET)
  - Summer (DST): UTC+02:00 (CEST)
- Postal codes: 67685
- Dialling codes: 06374
- Vehicle registration: KL
- Website: www.schwedelbach.de

Schwedelbach (German pronunciation: [ˈʃveːdl̩bax]) is a community in the district of Kaiserslautern, southern Rhineland-Palatinate, Germany. It is part of the Verbandsgemeinde Weilerbach.
