= Erzenhausen =

- Municipality
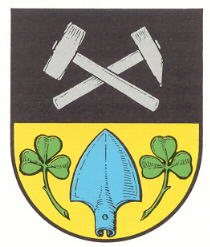
- Coat of arms

- Location of Erzenhausen within Kaiserslautern district
- Interactive map of Erzenhausen
- Location within Germany Location within Rhineland-Palatinate
- Coordinates: 49°30′00″N 7°37′00″E
- Country: Germany
- State: Rhineland-Palatinate
- District: Kaiserslautern
- Municipal assoc.: Weilerbach

Government
  - Mayor (2019–24): Klaus Urschel

Area
  - Total: 5.63 km^{2} (2.17 sq mi)
- Elevation: 247 m (810 ft)

Population (2025-12-31)
  - Total: 760
  - Density: 130/km^{2} (350/sq mi)
- Time zone: UTC+01:00 (CET)
  - Summer (DST): UTC+02:00 (CEST)
- Postal codes: 67685
- Dialling codes: 06374
- Vehicle registration: KL

Erzenhausen (German pronunciation: [ɛʁtsn̩ˈhaʊzn̩]) is a municipality in the district of Kaiserslautern, in Rhineland-Palatinate, western Germany.
