= Weilerbach (Verbandsgemeinde) =

Municipality in Rhineland-Palatinate, Germany

- Verbandsgemeinde
- Location of Weilerbach within Kaiserslautern district
- Interactive map of Weilerbach
- Location within Germany Location within Rhineland-Palatinate
- Coordinates: 49°29′N 7°38′E
- Country: Germany
- State: Rhineland-Palatinate
- District: Kaiserslautern
- Seat: Weilerbach
- Subdivisions: 8 municipalities

Area
  - Total: 71.97 km^{2} (27.79 sq mi)

Population (2025-12-31)
  - Total: 14,215
  - Density: 197.5/km^{2} (511.6/sq mi)
- Time zone: UTC+01:00 (CET)
  - Summer (DST): UTC+02:00 (CEST)
- Website: www.weilerbach.de

Weilerbach is a Verbandsgemeinde ("collective municipality") in the district of Kaiserslautern, Rhineland-Palatinate, Germany. The seat of the Verbandsgemeinde is in Weilerbach.

The Verbandsgemeinde Weilerbach consists of the following Ortsgemeinden ("local municipalities"):

1. Erzenhausen
2. Eulenbis
3. Kollweiler
4. Mackenbach
5. Reichenbach-Steegen
6. Rodenbach
7. Schwedelbach
8. Weilerbach
