= Inter-Valley Conference =

Ohio high school athletic conference

The Inter-Valley Conference is an Ohio High School Athletic Association (OHSAA) athletic league made up of 14 schools from Carroll, Coshocton, Holmes, Stark, Guernsey and Tuscarawas counties. The IVC formed in 1968 and added several new members in the 2017-18 school year.

== Current members ==
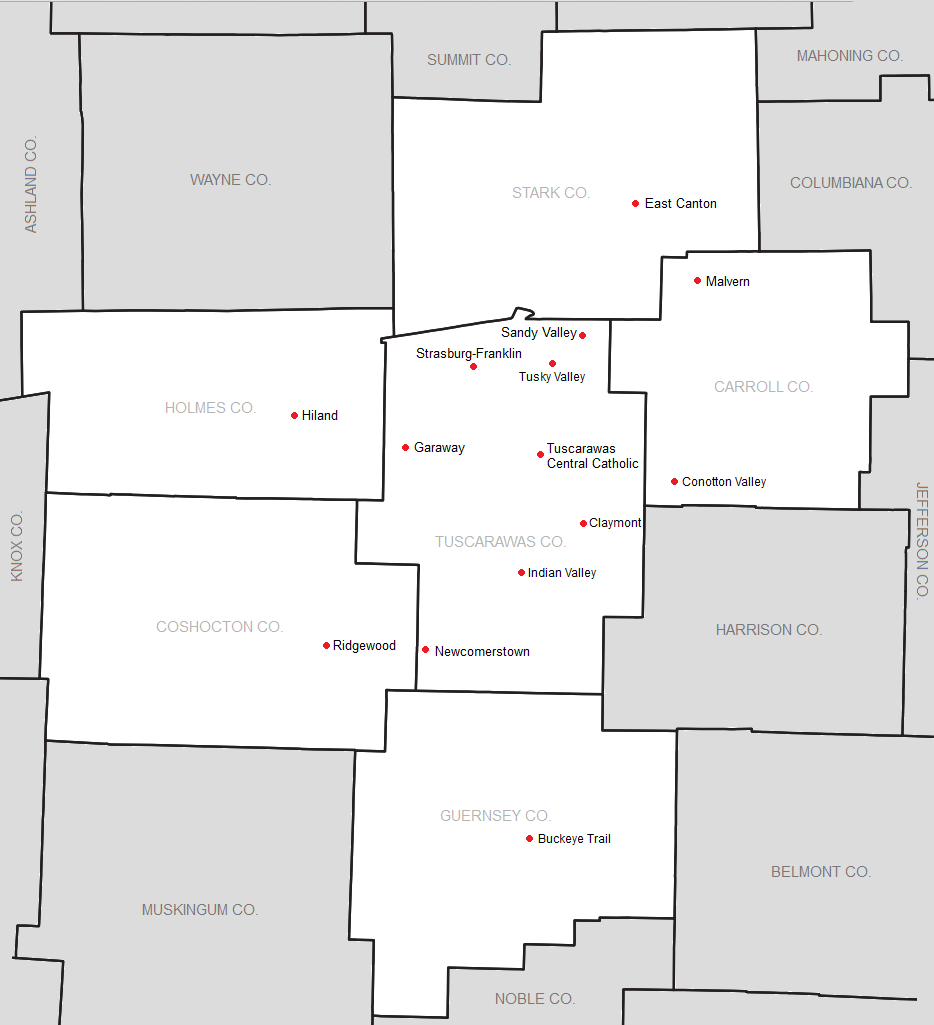
Member schools of the IVC

School	Nickname	Location	Colors	Tenure	Notes
North Division
Buckeye Trail	Warriors	Lore City		2017-	Leaving in 2028 for a new conference
Conotton Valley	Rockets	Bowerston		2001-2010; 2017-	Member school for all sports except football, leaving in 2028 for a new conference
East Canton	Hornets	East Canton		2013-	Leaving in 2028 for a new conference
Malvern	Hornets	Malvern		1968-	Leaving in 2028 for a new conference
Newcomerstown	Trojans	Newcomerstown		1968-	Leaving in 2028 for a new conference
Strasburg-Franklin	Tigers	Strasburg		1971-	Leaving in 2028 for a new conference
Tuscarawas Central Catholic	Saints	New Philadelphia		1970-	Leaving in 2028 for a new conference
South Division
Claymont	Mustangs	Uhrichsville		2017-	Leaving in 2028 for Northeast Senate League
Garaway	Pirates	Sugarcreek		1968-	
Hiland	Hawks	Berlin		1968-	
Indian Valley	Braves	Gnadenhutten		2017-	
Ridgewood	Generals	West Lafayette		1968-	
Sandy Valley	Cardinals	Magnolia		2001-	Leaving in 2028 for Northeast Senate League
Tuscarawas Valley	Trojans	Zoar		1974-1976; 2017	Leaving in 2028 for Northeast Senate League

== Former members ==
School	Nickname	Location	Colors	Tenure	Notes
Indian Valley North	Big Blue	Midvale		1968-1988	consolidated into Indian Valley
Indian Valley South	Rebels	Gnadenhutten		1968-1988	consolidated into Indian Valley
St. Joseph	Ramblers	Dover		1968-1970	consolidated into Tuscarawas Central Catholic
St. Mary's	Blue Wave	Dennison		1968-1970	consolidated into Tuscarawas Central Catholic
Jewett-Scio	Vikings	Jewett		1974-1998	consolidated into Harrison Central
Lakeland	Raiders	Freeport		1974-1998	consolidated into Harrison Central

== History ==
The Inter-Valley Conference formed in 1968, with founding members such as Garaway, Hiland, Malvern, Newcomerstown, Ridgewood, Indian Valley (North and South), St. Mary's and St. Joesph, More members joined in the early 70s such as Tuscarawas Valley, Strasburg-Franklin, Jewett-Scio and Lakeland. Tuscarawas Central Catholic joined in 1970, following the consolidation of St. Joesph and St. Mary's. Tuscarawas Valley left the league after 1976.

In 1988, Indian Valleys North and South schools consolidated into Indian Valley, just 10 years later, Lakeland and Jewett-Scio consolidated into Harrison Central High School. Indian Valley and Harrison Central joined different leagues following their respective consolidations.

Conotton Valley and Sandy Valley were added to the league in 2001. Conotton Valley would leave the league in 2010. East Canton High School joined shortly after in 2013.

In 2017, the IVC added five more member schools, such as Buckeye Trail, Claymont, and Indian Valley, as well as welcoming back Conotton Valley and Tuscarawas Valley. Conotton Valley would be a member for all sports except football, which they will remain a member of the Ohio Valley Athletic Conference. A two-division system was put in place, with the league now having 16 members, with the North Division including Buckeye Trail, Conotton Valley, East Canton, Malvern, Newcomerstown, Strasburg-Franklin and Tuscarawas Central Catholic, and the South Division including Claymont, Garaway, Hiland, Indian Valley, Ridgewood, Sandy Valley, and Tuscarawas Valley.

Claymont, Sandy Valley, and Tuscarawas Valley announced their intention to leave the IVC effective the 2028-29 school year for a new athletic conference with Carrollton, Fairless, Minerva, Marlington, and Tuslaw all of them being former Senate League members. In May 2026, seven more schools, Malvern, Connotton Valley, Buckeye Trail, Newcomerstown, East Canton, Strasburg-Franklin and Tuscarawas Central Catholic announced their intention to leave the IVC beginning the 2028–29 school year for a new conference.

== State championships ==
IVC Team State Championships
#	School	Titles
16	Hiland	Basketball (B): 1992, 2011, 2012, 2026; Basketball (G): 2000, 2005, 2006, 2008, 2017, 2021; Baseball: 2016, 2023, 2024, 2025; Golf (B): 2019, 2021
8	Strasburg-Franklin	Basketball (B): 1967; Basketball (G): 2026; Softball: 1987, 1988, 1989, 1991, 2009, 2011, 2013
5	East Canton	XC (B): 2016; Track (B): 2017, 2018, 2019
3	Garaway	Golf (B): 2004, 2007, 2008
2	Indian Valley South	Basketball (B): 1972, 1976
2	Indian Valley	Football: 2024; Baseball: 2009
1	Tuscarawas Central Catholic	Golf (B): 1975

== See also ==
- Ohio High School Athletic Conferences
