= Tuscarawas Central Catholic High School =

Location
- 777 Third Street NE; New Philadelphia, (Tuscarawas County), Ohio 44663-2741; United States; 40°30′2″N 81°26′16″W

Information
- Type: Private, Coeducational
- Religious affiliation: Roman Catholic
- Established: 1970
- Oversight: Roman Catholic Diocese of Columbus
- Principal: Jennifer Calvo
- Grades: 7–12
- Colors: Black and Gold
- Athletics conference: Inter-Valley Conference
- Team name: Saints
- Rival: Strasburg Tigers
- Newspaper: Central Voice
- Yearbook: Clarion
- Website: http://www.tccsaints.com

Tuscarawas Central Catholic Junior/Senior High School is a private, Catholic high school in New Philadelphia, Ohio, United States. It is one of eleven secondary schools operated under the direction of the Roman Catholic Diocese of Columbus. Athletic teams compete as the Tuscarawas Central Catholic Saints in the Ohio High School Athletic Association as a member of the Inter-Valley Conference.

== History ==
Tuscarawas Central Catholic was formed in 1970 by the merger of St. Mary High School in Dennison and St. Joseph High School in Dover.

== OHSAA state championships ==
- Boys' golf – 1975
