= Indian Valley High School (Ohio) =

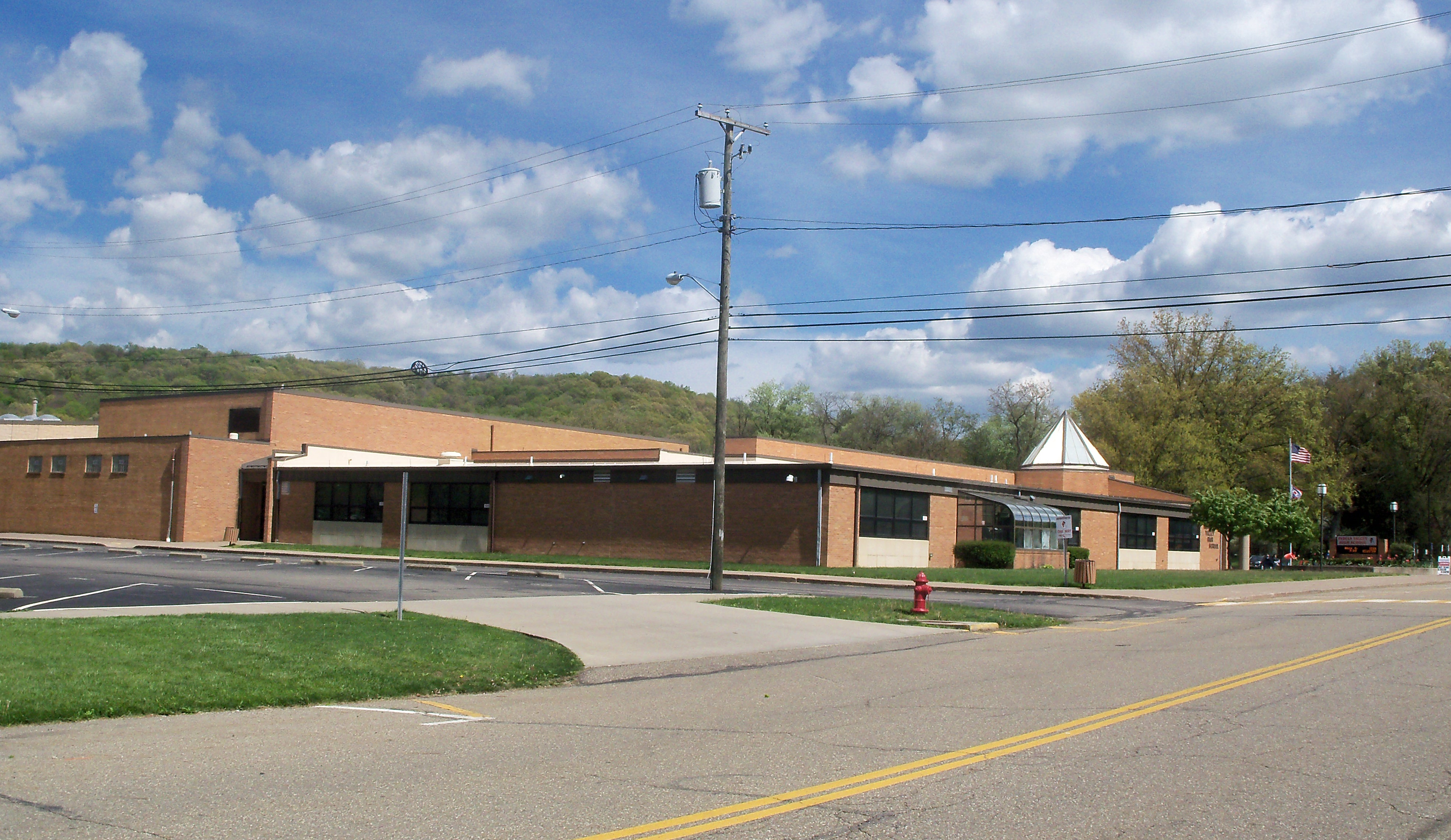

Location
- 100 North Walnut Street; Gnadenhutten, Ohio 44629; United States
- Coordinates: 40°21′21″N 81°25′56″W

Information
- Type: Public, Coeducational high school
- Established: 1988
- School district: Indian Valley Local School District
- Superintendent: Ira Wentworth
- Principal: Robert Clarke
- Teaching staff: 30.50 (FTE)
- Grades: 9-12
- Student to teacher ratio: 14.46
- Colors: Red and Blue
- Athletics conference: Inter-Valley Conference
- Team name: Braves
- Rival: Claymont High School
- Athletic Director: Nicholas Swaldo
- Website: ivhs.ivschools.org

Indian Valley High School is a public high school in Gnadenhutten, Ohio, United States. It is the only high school in the Indian Valley Local School District. The sports teams are called the Braves, and they compete in the Ohio High School Athletic Association as a member of the Inter-Valley Conference.

Indian Valley High School was formed when Indian Valley North High School in Midvale, Ohio consolidated with Indian Valley South High School.

== OHSAA State Championships ==
- Boys Baseball - 2009
- Boys Basketball – 1972, 1976
- Boys Football - 2024

== Notable alumni ==
- Bob Huggins, basketball player (Indian Valley South)
