= World's Largest Cuckoo Clock (Sugarcreek, Ohio) =

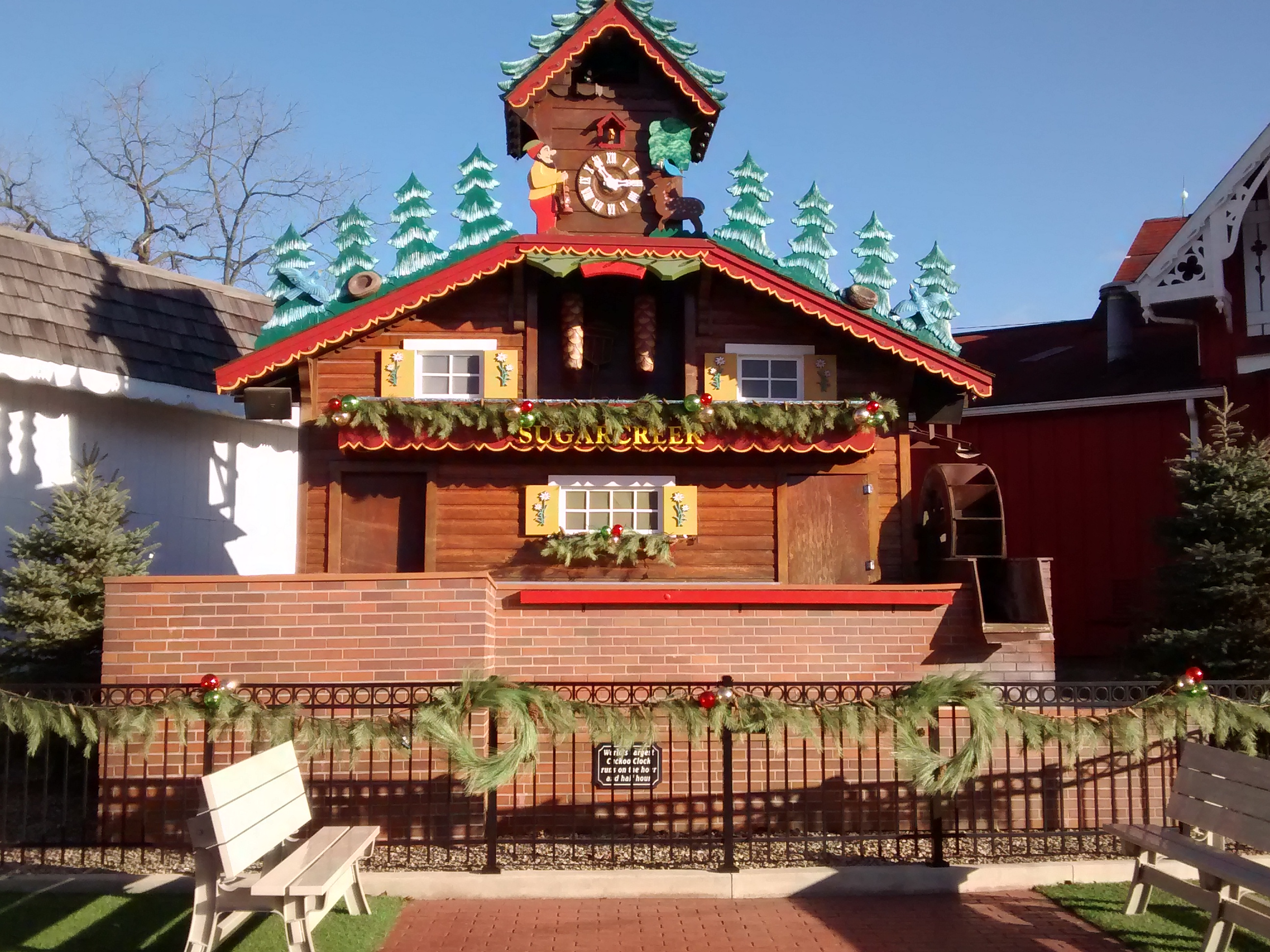
- World's Largest Cuckoo Clock in downtown Sugarcreek
- Interactive map of the World's Largest Cuckoo Clock area

General information
- Type: Outdoor animated clock / roadside attraction
- Location: Sugarcreek, Ohio, United States, Main Street at North Broadway, Sugarcreek, Ohio
- Coordinates: 40°30′11″N 81°38′26″W
- Opened: 1972
- Renovated: 2012 (relocated and restored)

Website
- visitsugarcreek.com/visit-the-worlds-largest-cuckoo-clock.html

World's Largest Cuckoo Clock is a large, animated outdoor cuckoo clock located at Main Street and North Broadway in Sugarcreek, Ohio, United States. Built in 1972 for the Swiss-themed Alpine–Alpa restaurant near Wilmot, Ohio, the clock was relocated to downtown Sugarcreek in 2012 and returned to operation later that year. The structure stands approximately 23.5 ft (7.2 m) high and 24 ft (7.3 m) wide, and at regular intervals a cuckoo bird emerges as a mechanized band plays and a dancing couple appears on the facade.

== Description ==
The installation consists of a timber facade with an upper-stage balcony and animated figures, including a five-piece band and a dancing couple. On the half-hour, a cuckoo bird emerges and the figures perform to polka music. Published dimensions place the structure at roughly 23.5 ft (7.2 m) tall, 24 ft (7.3 m) wide, and 6.5 ft (2.0 m) deep. The clock is sited at the corner of Main Street and North Broadway in Sugarcreek's Swiss Village commercial district.

== History ==
The clock was commissioned for the Alpine–Alpa restaurant near Wilmot, Ohio, and installed on the property in the early 1970s. Following the restaurant's closure in 2009, the timepiece was purchased and relocated to downtown Sugarcreek, where volunteers and local officials coordinated repairs and site improvements. The move was reported in May 2012, and the clock resumed operation later that year.

== Location and access ==
The clock stands in Sugarcreek's central square at Main Street and North Broadway. Viewing is free, and the animated performance generally runs at regular intervals during the warmer months, with seasonal pauses in winter.

== See also ==
- List of largest cuckoo clocks
