= Newcomerstown High School =

American Ohio public high school

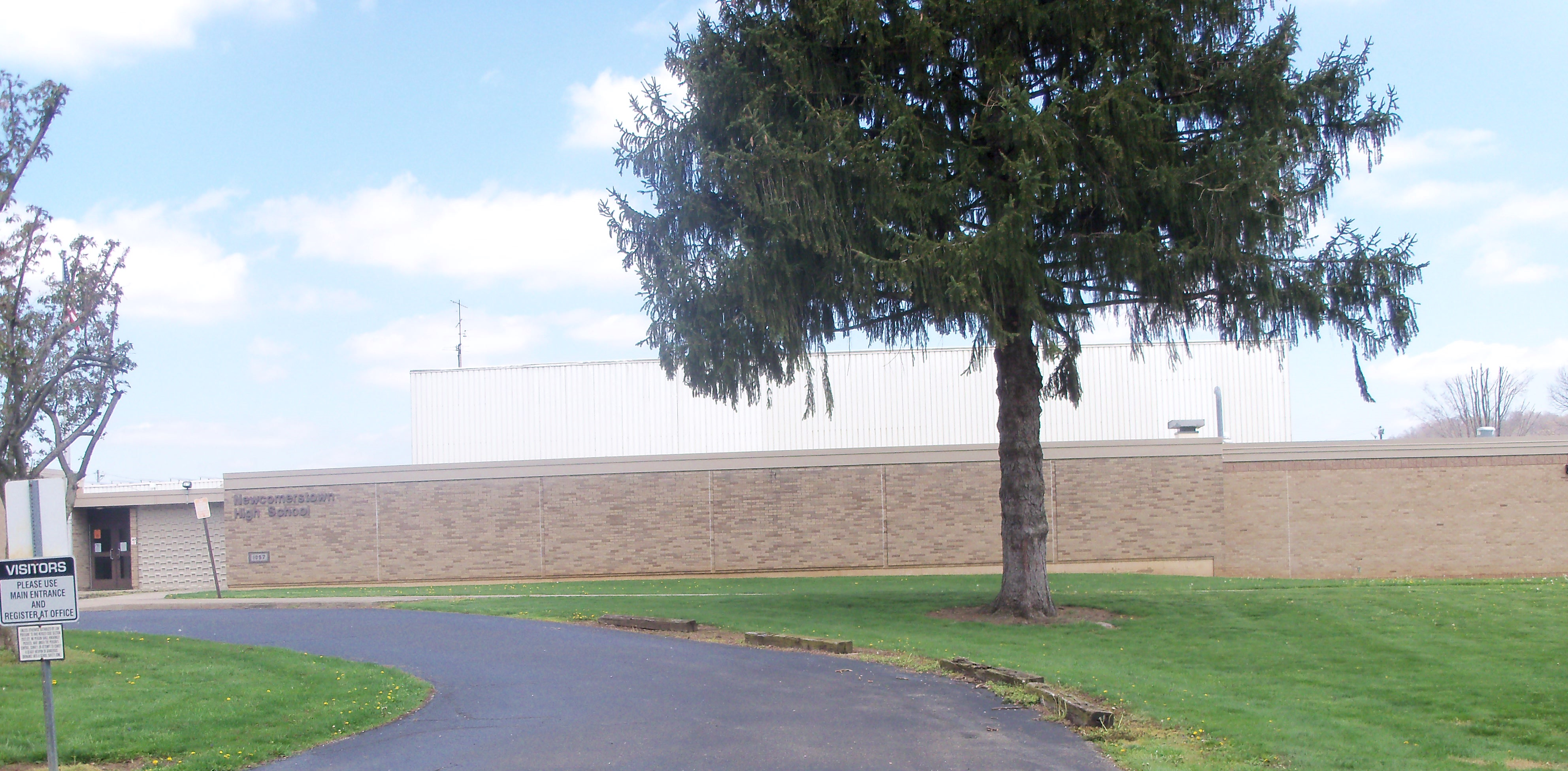

Location
- 659 S. Beaver St. Newcomerstown, (Tuscarawas County), Ohio 43832; United States
- Coordinates: 40°15′57″N 81°36′43″W

Information
- Type: Public, Coeducational high school
- Grades: 9-12
- Enrollment: 244 (2023-2024)
- Color
- Athletics conference: Inter-Valley Conference
- Nickname: Trojans
- Website: http://www.nctschools.org/

Newcomerstown High School is a public high school in Newcomerstown, Ohio. It is the only high school in the Newcomerstown Exempted Village Schools district.

== History ==
Although the school district was first established in 1856, the first building dedicated for grades 9-12 was not built until 1924. The current high school building, located at 659 Beaver St., was constructed in 1965.

== Ohio High School Athletic Association State Championships ==
- Boys Baseball – 1929

== Famous alumni ==
- Woody Hayes, Ohio State University football coach
- Cy Young, American Major League Baseball pitcher
