= Edwin Wolf =

Jewish-American manufacturer and banker (1855–1934)

Edwin Wolf (March 11, 1855 – December 16, 1934) was a Jewish-American manufacturer and banker from Philadelphia.

== Life ==
Wolf was born on March 11, 1855, in Uhrichsville, Ohio, the son of Elias Wolf and Amalia Mayer. His father was a German immigrant from Bavaria. He moved with his family to Philadelphia when he was one.

Wolf attended public school, after which he began working in his father's manufacturing business. He succeeded his father to the business when the latter retired in 1877. A year later, he went to Europe for three months for health reasons. In 1882, he and his four younger brothers established a printing business. The business developed into a paper box manufacturing concern, and then an envelope and paper manufacturing business under the name Wolf Bros. He later manufactured hosiery knitting machines. He was also treasurer of the Standard Machine Co., a director of the Betzwood Film Co., and a member of the banking and brokerage firm Wolf Brothers & Co. from 1900 until his death.

Wolf was elected to the Board of Public Education of Philadelphia in 1901. There, he installed a new accounting system that was still in use by 1943. He was elected president of the Board in 1917, the first Jew to hold that position, and he retired from the Board in 1920. In 1902, he was elected president of the Jewish Publication Society of America. It was under his presidency that the Jewish Publication Society of America Version of the Bible was published. He was also a board member of the Free Library of Philadelphia, a governor of the Eastern State Penitentiary and Dropsie College, and a member of the Ohio Society, the Manufacturers Club, and the Mercantile Club. He attended Congregation Rodeph Shalom.

In 1882, Wolf married Miriam Fleisher. Their children were Blanche (wife of Isidore Kohn) and Morris. Morris was a lawyer who served as Assistant District Attorney of Philadelphia, State Deputy Attorney General, and Judge of the Court of Common Pleas. Morris' sons were lawyer Robert B. Wolf and librarian Edwin Wolf II.

Wolf died at his daughter's home from an intestinal ailment on December 16, 1934. His funeral was held at his home and was officiated by Rabbi Louis Wolsey. The Jewish Publication Society president Jacob Solis-Cohen, Cyrus Adler, and Horace Stern attended the funeral. He was buried in Mount Sinai Cemetery.
