= Dean Sensanbaugher =

American football player (1925–2005)

- Sensanbaugher in 1944

No. 94
- Positions: Halfback, defensive back

Personal information
- Born: August 12, 1925; Midvale, Ohio, U.S.
- Died: November 8, 2005 (aged 80); Lakeland, Florida, U.S.
- Listed height: 5 ft 9 in (1.75 m)
- Listed weight: 190 lb (86 kg)

Career information
- High school: Uhrichsville (Uhrichsville, Ohio)
- College: Ohio State; Army

Career history
- Cleveland Browns (1948); New York Bulldogs (1949); Toronto Argonauts (1952)

Awards and highlights
- AAFC champion (1948); 2× National champion (1944, 1945)

Career statistics
- Games: 15
- Rushing yards: 95
- Touchdowns: 2
- Stats at Pro Football Reference

Dean Sparks Sensanbaugher (August 12, 1925 – November 8, 2005) was an American professional football player who was a halfback and defensive back for two seasons with the Cleveland Browns and New York Bulldogs in the All-America Football Conference (AAFC) and National Football League (NFL) in the late 1940s.

Sensanbaugher played college football for the Ohio State Buckeyes under head coach Paul Brown in 1943, but left the following year to serve in the U.S. Army during World War II. He transferred to the United States Military Academy and played for an Army Black Knights team that won all of its games in 1944 and finished first in the AP Poll. When the war ended, he returned to Ohio State to finish his college career.

Sensanbaugher joined the Cleveland Browns, a professional team coached by Brown, in 1948. The Browns went undefeated that year and won a third straight AAFC championship. The Browns released him the following year, however, and he played briefly for the Bulldogs and in the Canadian Football League before leaving the sport. Sensanbaugher later worked in trucking and settled in Florida, where he died in 2005.

== Early life and college ==
Born to Ted and Glenna Sparks Sensanbaugher, Dean Sensanbaugher grew up in Uhrichsville, Ohio, and attended the town's high school. He enrolled at Ohio State University in 1943 and made the school's football team as a freshman halfback under coach Paul Brown. Brown was forced to play 17-year-olds that year because his older players had been drafted into the United States military as World War II intensified. Sensanbaugher returned a kickoff 103 yards for a touchdown in a game against Naval Station Great Lakes in 1944, setting a school record that still stands as of 2015. The Ohio State Buckeyes finished with a 3–6 record that year. After the season, he was named Ohio State's most outstanding freshman. He played in the East–West Shrine Game in California, an annual college all-star game.

Sensanbaugher himself joined the U.S. Army in 1944 and transferred to the United States Military Academy in West Point, New York. He played football for Army in late 1944 and participated in that year's Army–Navy Game, which Army won 23–7. Army had a perfect 9–0 win–loss record in the 1944 season, and finished the year ranked first in the AP Poll. Early the following year, however, Sensanbaugher was deemed ineligible to continue playing because he flunked three courses.

Sensanbaugher trained in Louisiana and was moved to California in preparation for active duty, but the war ended before he was sent to fight overseas. Sensanbaugher then transferred to Amherst College in Massachusetts and back to Ohio State to finish his college career in 1947.

Married Virginia Scott, had two sons Scott and Dirk Sensanbaugher.

== Professional career ==
Sensanbaugher gave up his final year of college eligibility in 1948 after he was selected by the Cleveland Browns in the 1948 AAFC Draft, a professional team in the All-America Football Conference (AAFC) coached by Brown. The signing of Sensanbaugher and other former Ohio State players with remaining college eligibility was controversial; it angered Ohio State fans who felt Brown was depleting the school's football team. Brown defended Sensanbaugher's decision to go to the Browns by saying it was not about money and that he "just wants to play football, and decided he'd rather play with us than with Ohio State". Cleveland went undefeated in 1948 and won a third straight AAFC championship as Sensanbaugher rushed for 59 yards and one touchdown.

The Browns released Sensanbaugher before the 1949 season, and he was picked up by the NFL's New York Bulldogs. He stayed there until he was released in October. In 1950, Sensanbaugher was named an assistant coach at Otterbein University in Westerville, Ohio, near his hometown. Sensanbaugher resumed his playing career in 1952, trying out for the Ottawa Rough Riders of the Canadian Football League and later playing in Canada for the Toronto Argonauts.

== Later life and death ==
Sensanbaugher worked in the trucking industry after leaving football, and settled in Lakeland, Florida in 1992. He died there in 2005. He had two sons, a daughter and one stepson.
