= The Budget (Ohio newspaper) =

Weekly newspaper in the United States

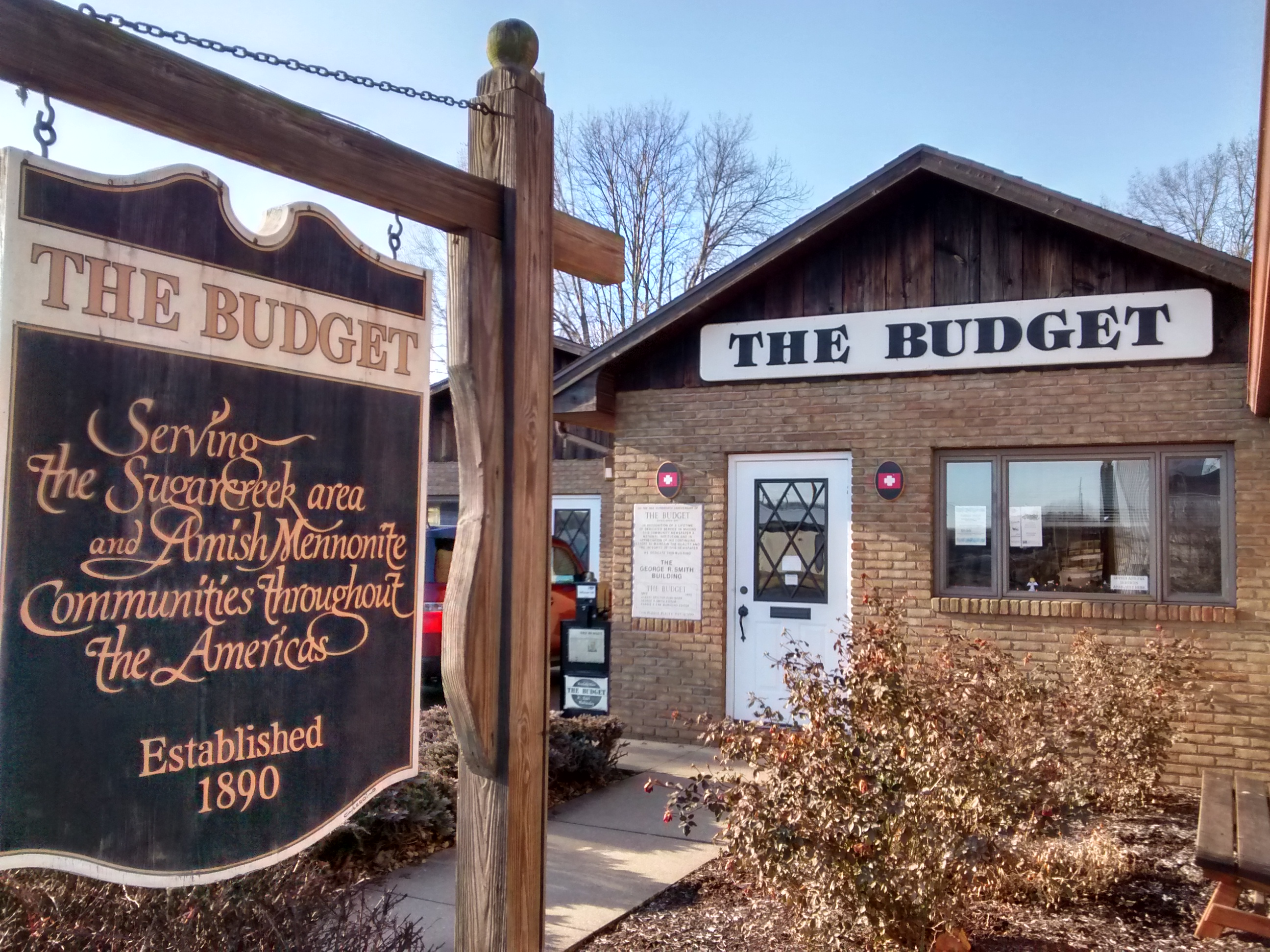
- The Budget, main building and sign
- City: Sugarcreek
- Country: USA

The Budget is a US weekly newspaper published in Ohio for and by members of various plain Anabaptist Christian communities including the Amish, Amish Mennonite, Beachy Amish, as well as plain Mennonite and Brethren communities. The Budget began publishing in 1890. The paper was known as The Weekly Budget up to the time the Royal Printing Company began publishing it in 1920.

Currently, The Budget is published in two editions: a local edition and a national edition, each with different content and readership. The local edition includes the national edition inside. The most unique thing about the Budget is that it consists mainly of columns written and sent in by Scribes in various plain Anabaptist communities all around the world. The Budget Scribes document community events such as baptisms, weddings, births and funerals, as well as information on church attendance, visitors, weather, accidents or illnesses, agricultural happenings, special church and school events. It is similar to a collection of circle letters, allowing folks to keep up with friends and relatives who live in far-flung plain communities.

== History ==
Although the founder and first editor of The Budget from 1890 though 1913 was Amish Mennonite John C. Miller, nicknamed "Budget John", the paper was not founded as an Anabaptist paper but as a local paper in Sugarcreek, Ohio. Amish Mennonite minister Samuel H. Miller was the second editor through 1920. He was followed by S.A. Smith until 1930, when Smith's son George R. Smith took over until 1969. Keith Rathbun, formerly of the Cleveland Scene alternative weekly, served as publisher from 2000 - 2016. Milo G. Miller took the lead as publisher in 2017.

== Local edition ==
The local edition focuses on stories of local interest in several Ohio counties, and includes several pages of non-Amish-specific content. It is the most-read newspaper in its area including Holmes County as well as parts of Tuscarawas, Wayne and Coshocton counties.

== National edition ==
Despite its name, the national edition is published not only nationwide but in several other countries in the Americas as well as overseas.

== See also ==
- Amish in Ohio
