= List of largest cuckoo clocks =

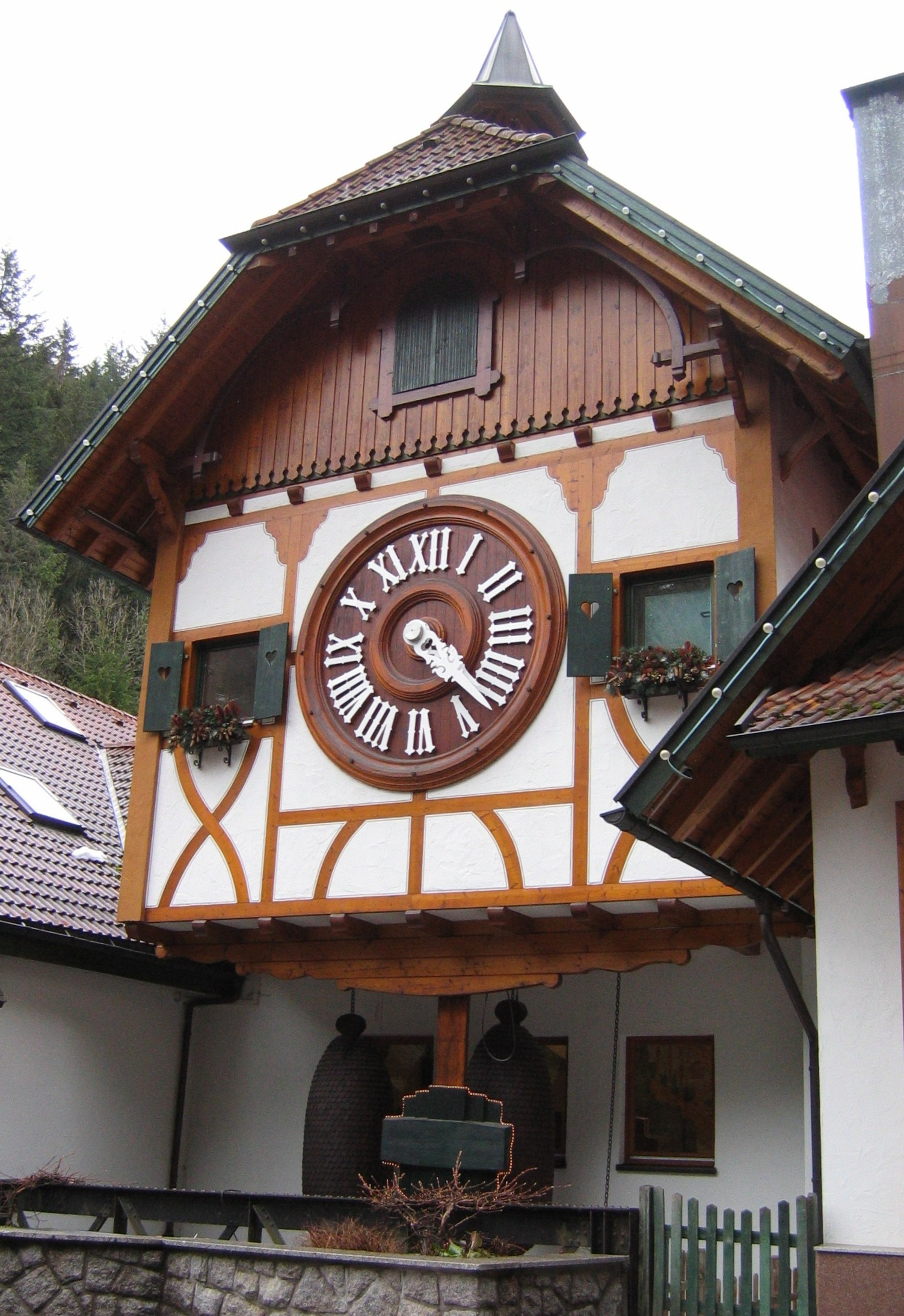
The world's largest cuckoo clock since 1997, according to the Guinness Book of Records. Schonachbach (Triberg, Germany).

Several unusually large cuckoo clocks have been built and installed in different cities of the world with the aim of attracting visitors, as part of publicity of a cuckoo clock shop, or to serve as a landmark for the community and town.

Some have been awarded with the title of "World's Largest Cuckoo Clock" by the Guinness World Records.

== Argentina ==
- Eduardo Castex, inaugurated in 1977.
- La Cumbrecita, 2011.
- La Falda, 1963.
- Villa Carlos Paz, 1958.
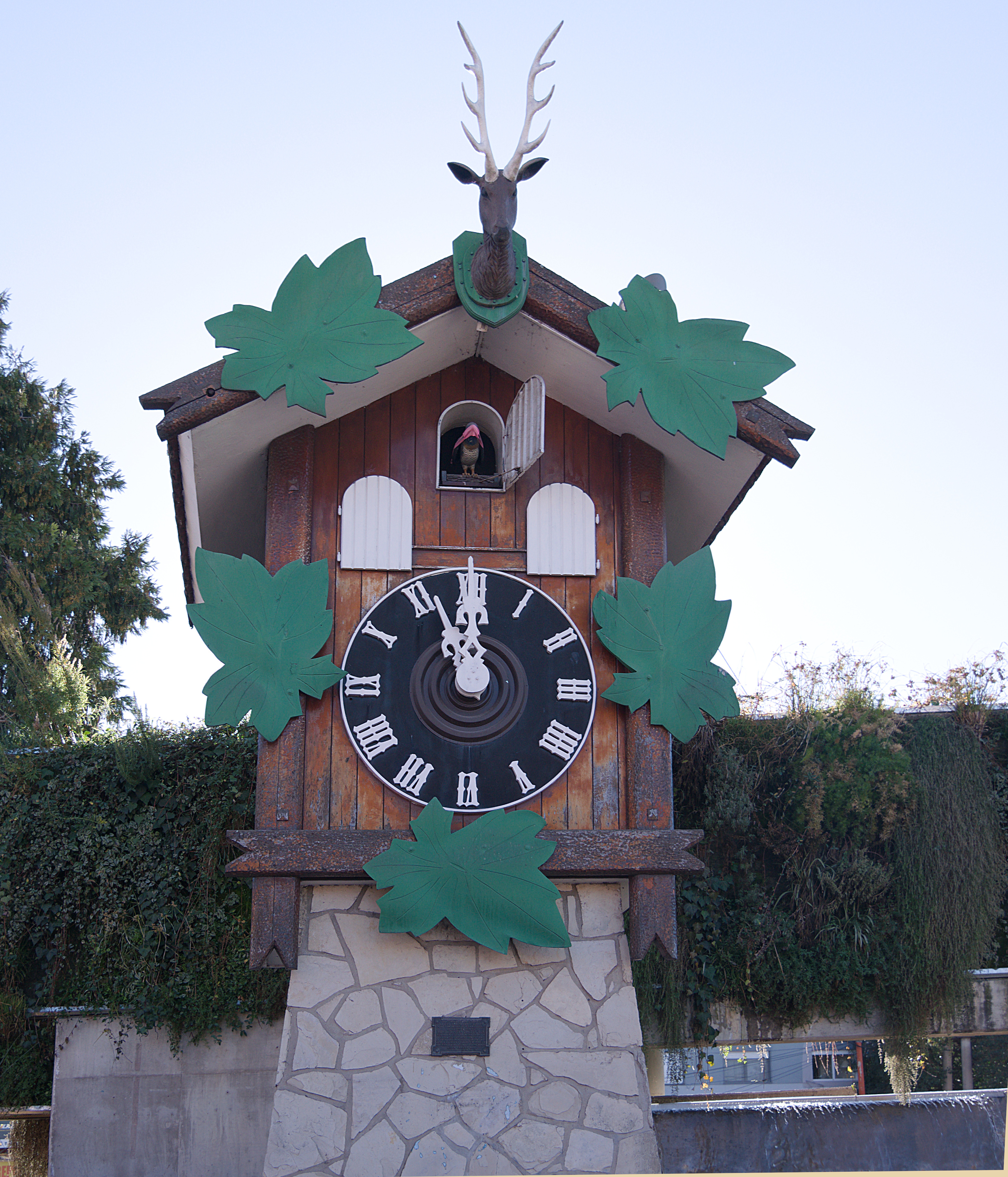
Villa Carlos Paz

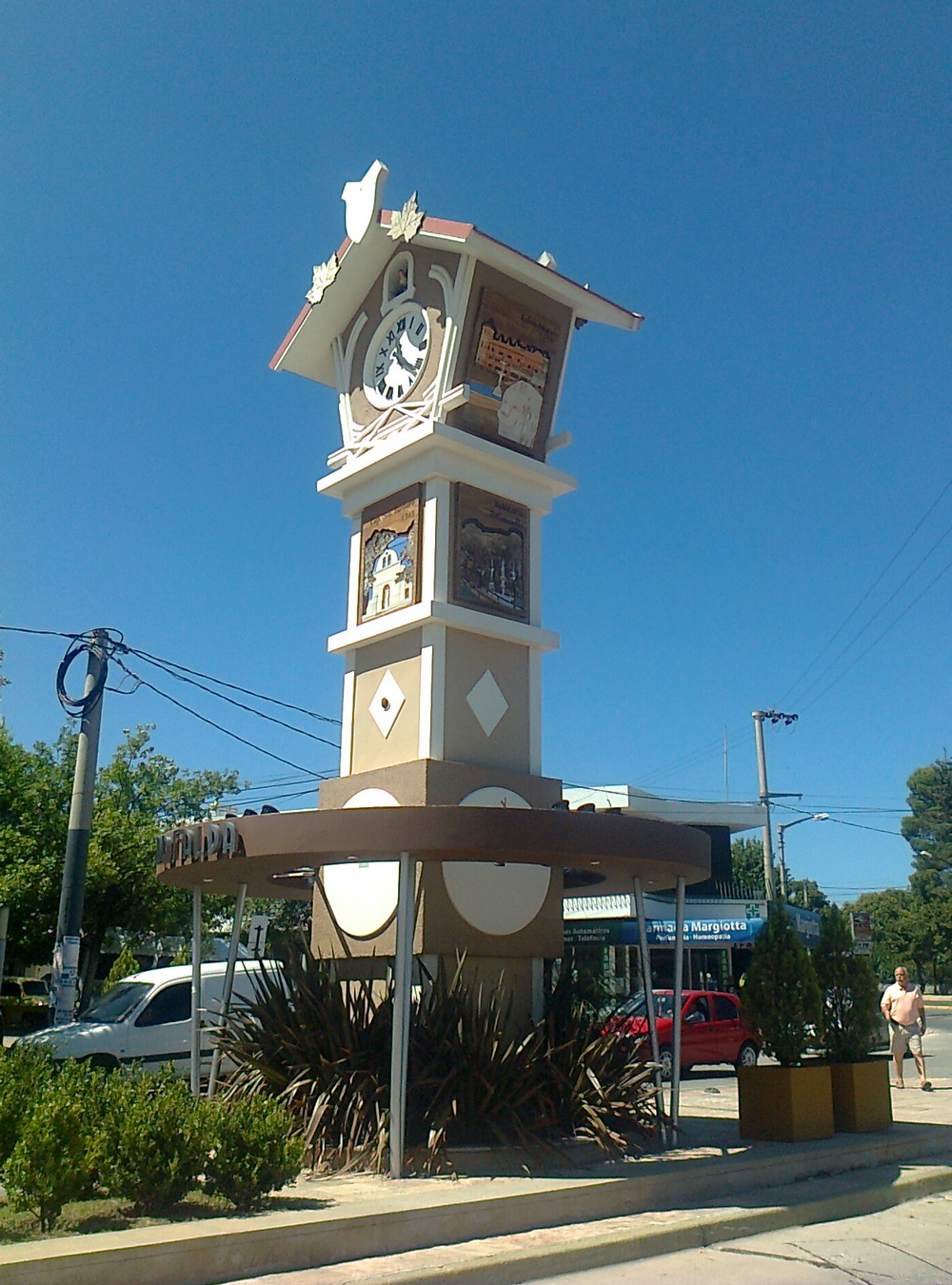
La Falda

== Brazil ==
- Gramado

== England ==
- Pembridge, Herefordshire, 2013.

== Germany ==
Black Forest:

- Höllsteig (Breitnau), 1994.
- Niederwasser (Hornberg), 1995, cuckoo and quail clock.
- Schonach, 1980.
- Schonachbach (Triberg), 1994.
- Titisee-Neustadt
- Villingen-Schwenningen, 2021.
- Furtwangen, 2025.

Other parts of Germany:

- Gernrode, 1997.
- Sankt Goar, world's largest free-hanging cuckoo clock.
- Wiesbaden, 1946.
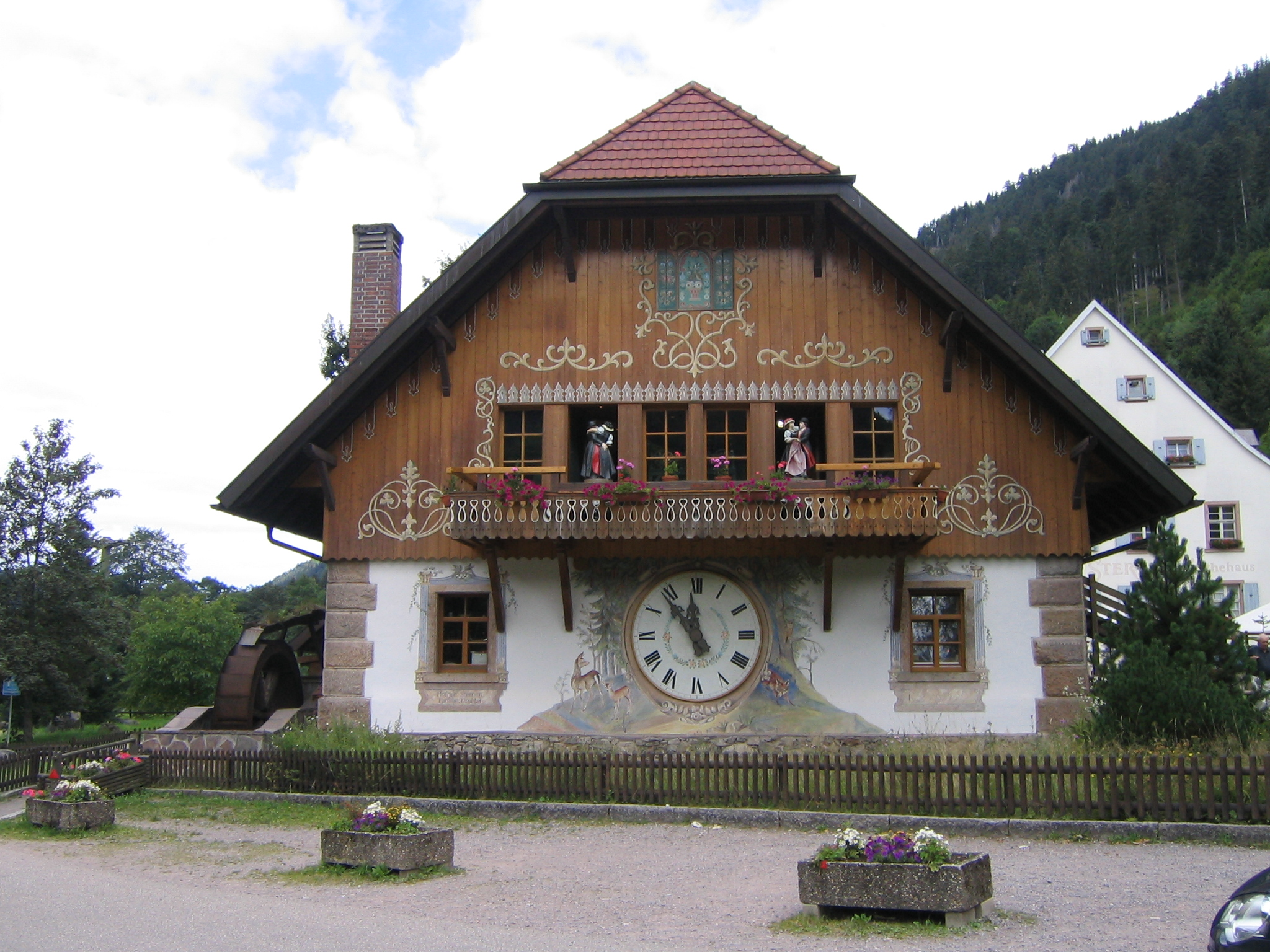
Höllsteig (Breitnau)

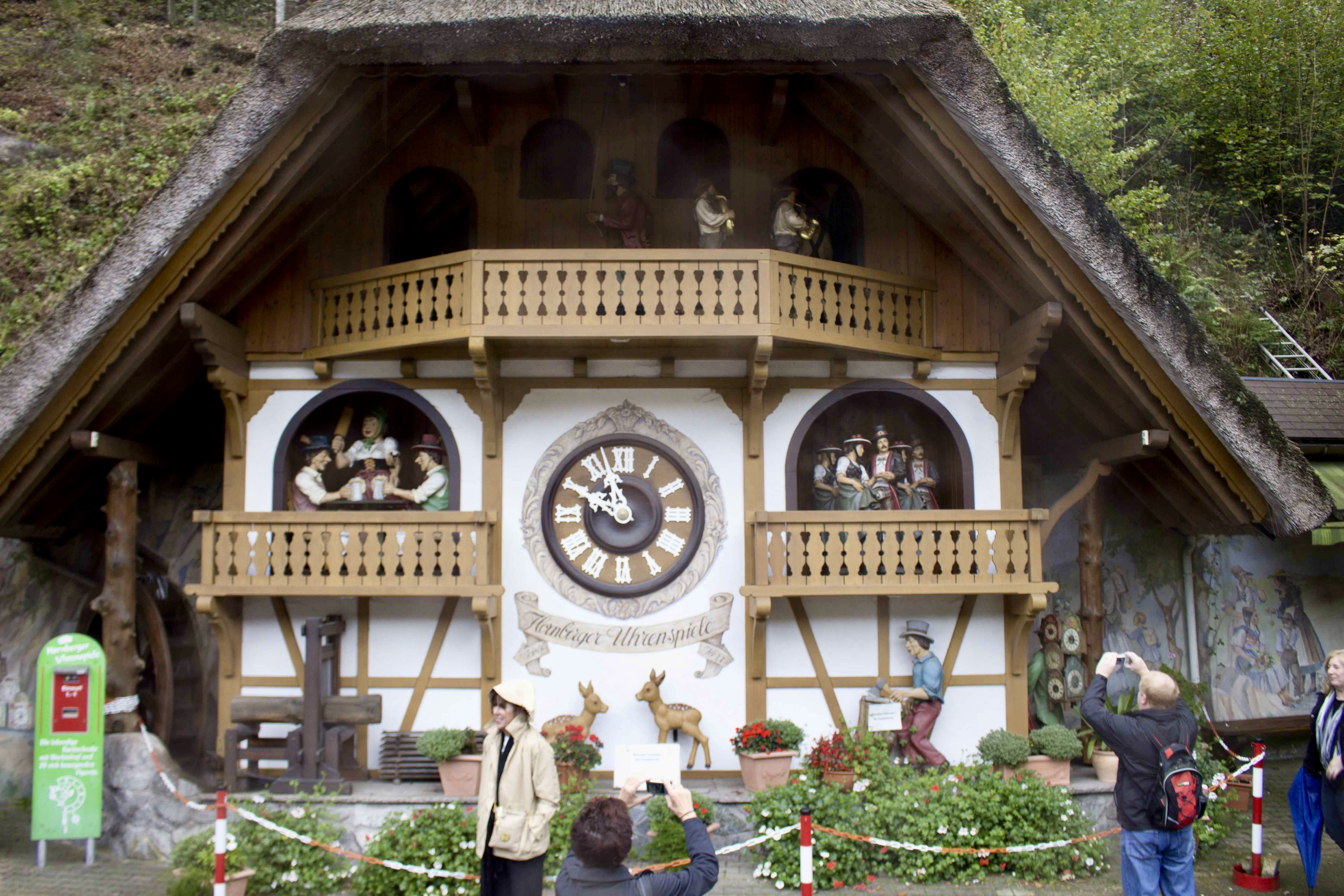
Cuckoo and quail clock, Niederwasser (Hornberg)

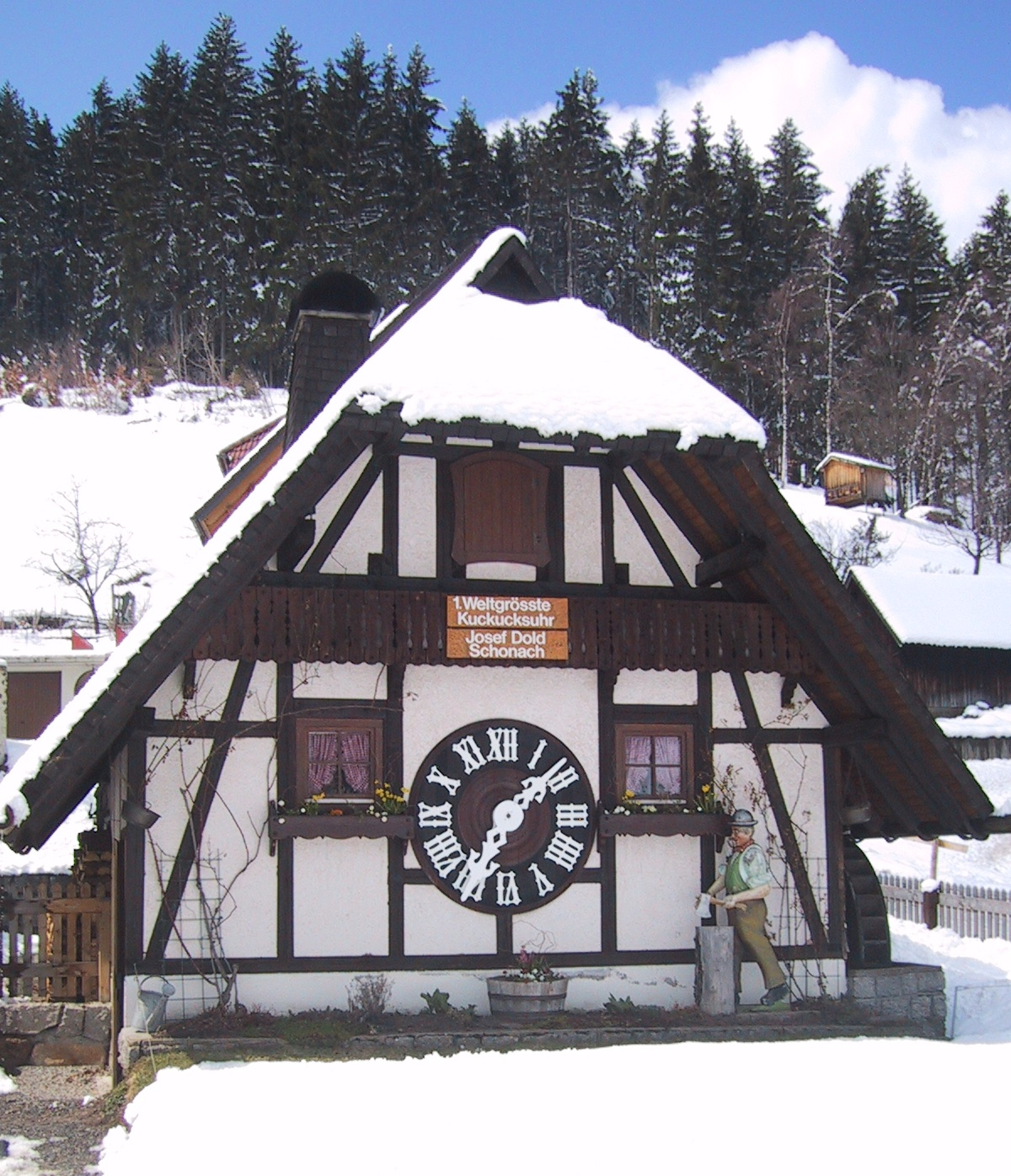
Schonach. Completed in 1980, it is the first world's largest cuckoo clock. In 1984 made it into the Guinness Book of Records.

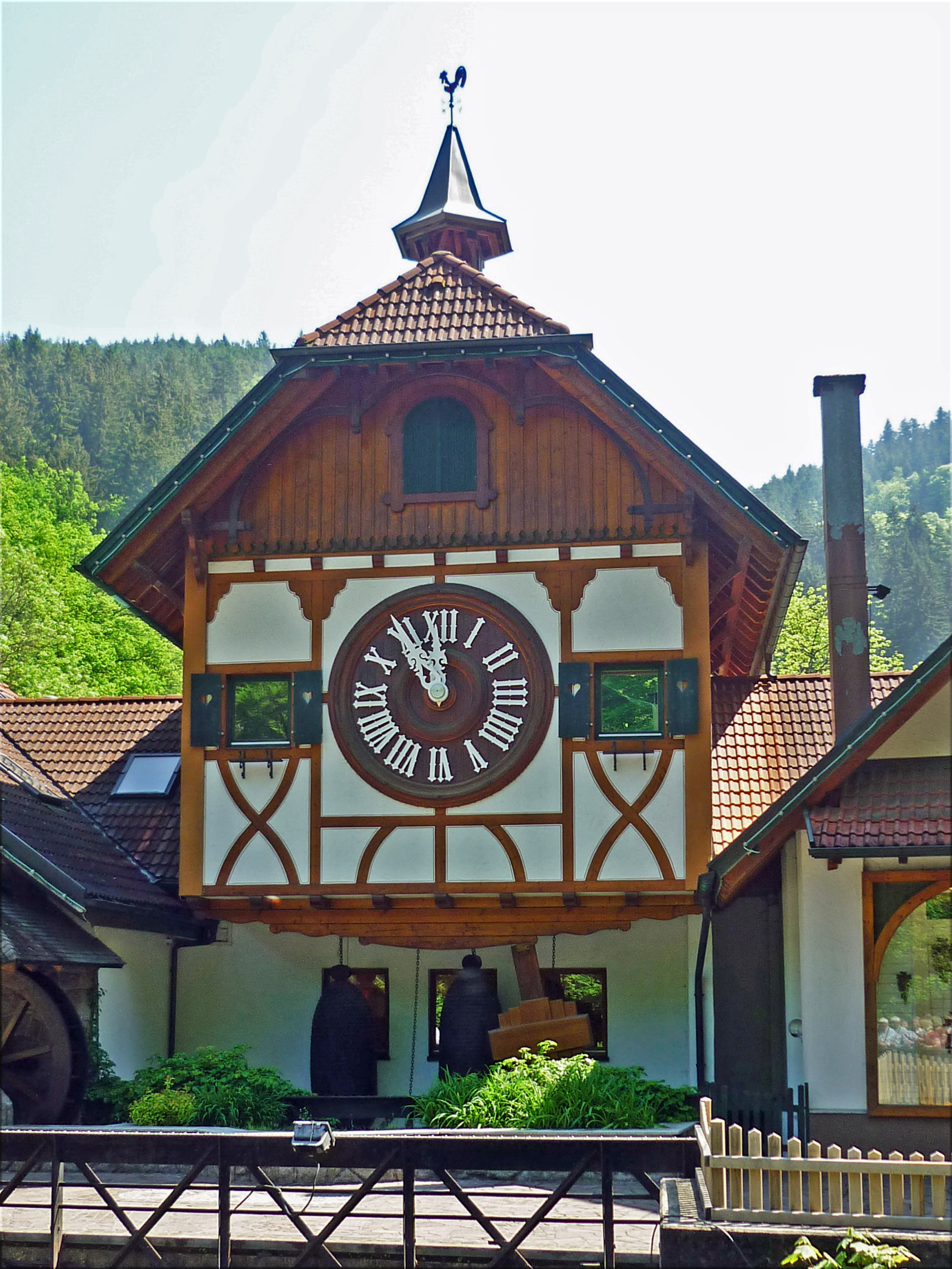
Schonachbach (Triberg). Completed in 1994, it is the world's largest cuckoo clock, a distinction it has held since 1997, when entered the Guinness Book of Records.

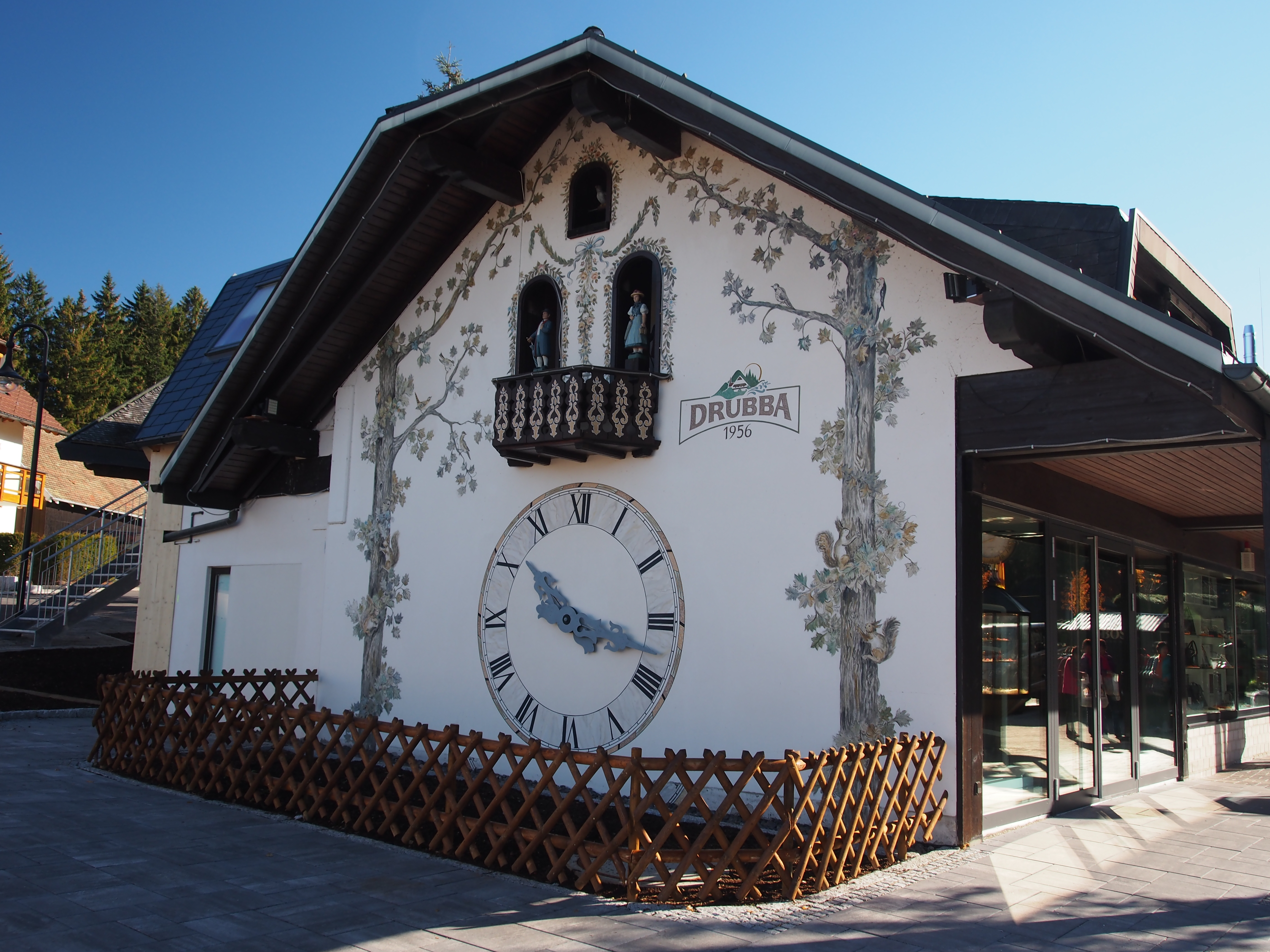
Titisee-Neustadt

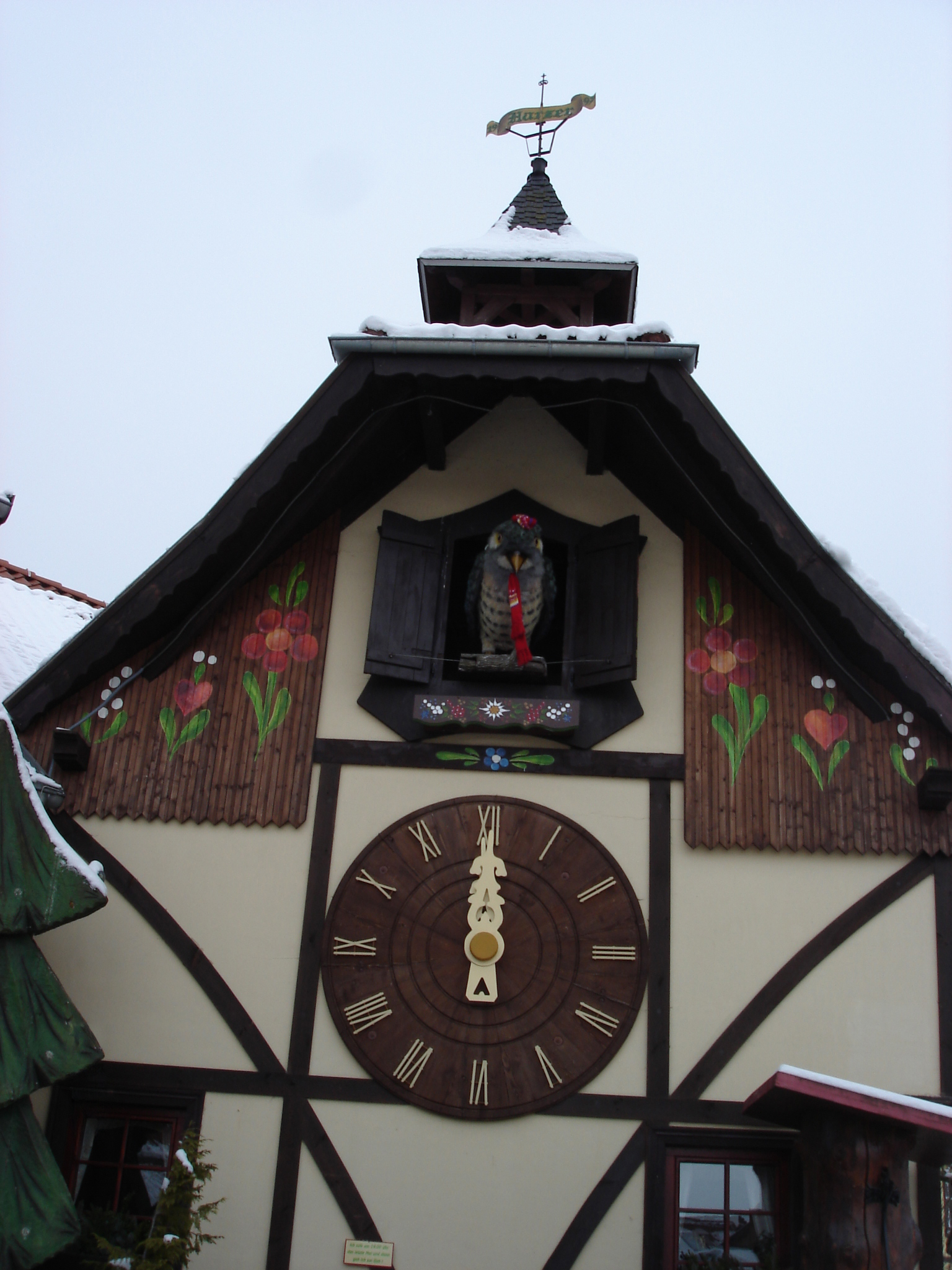
Gernrode

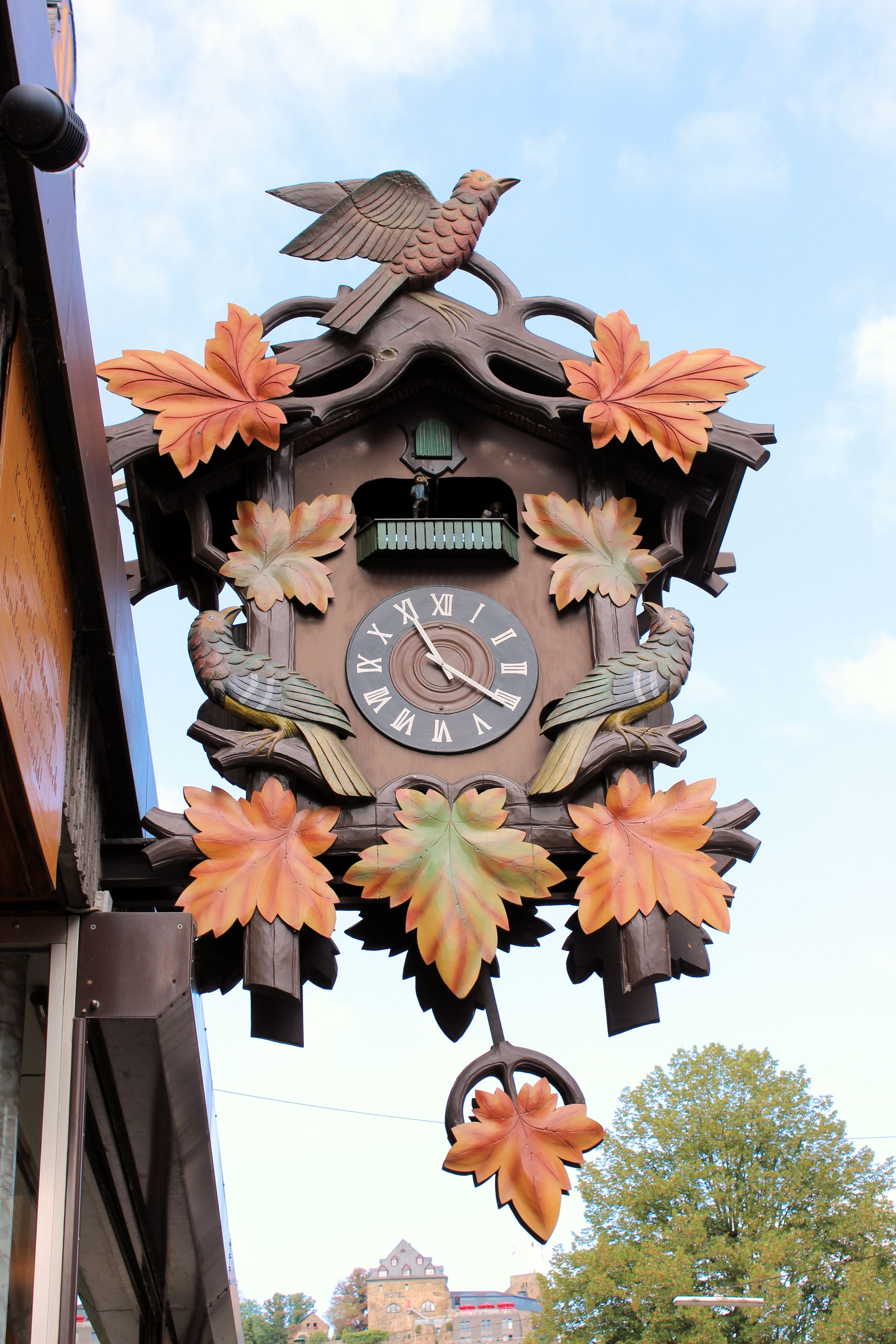
Sankt Goar

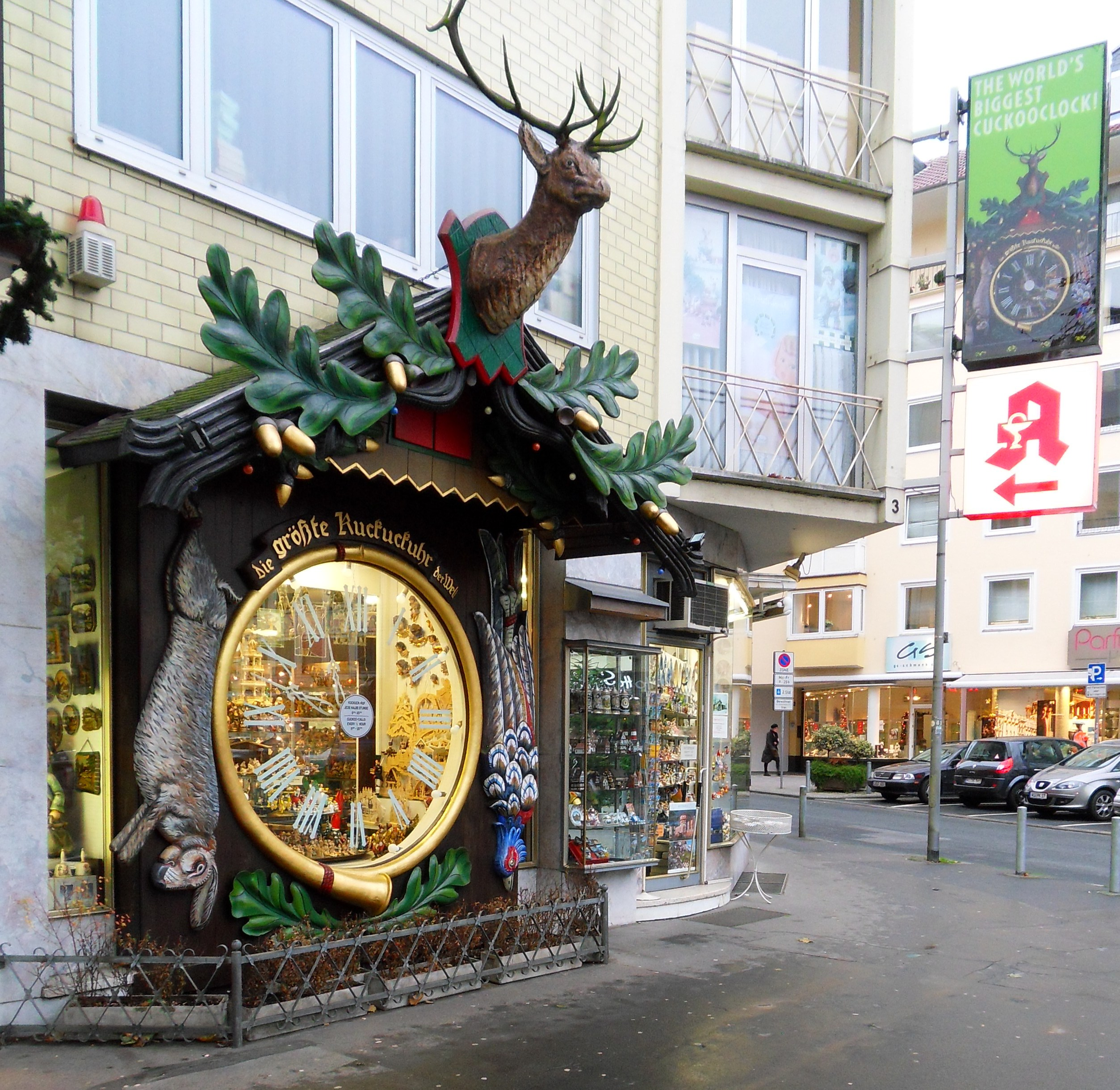
Wiesbaden

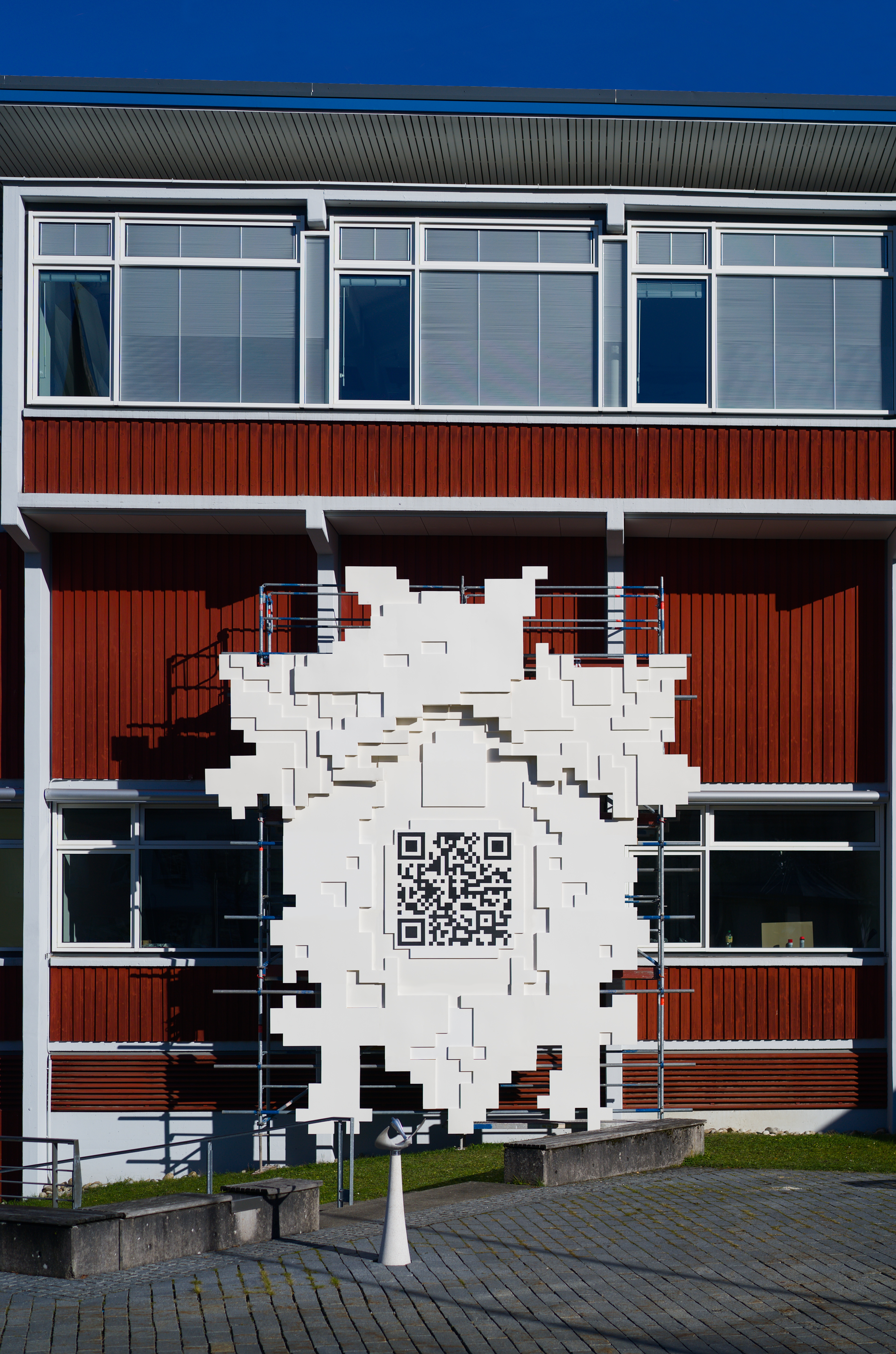
World's Largest Cuckoo Clock (Digital) mounted in front of the German Clock Museum in Furtwangen

== Italy ==
- Canazei, 2008, with carillon.

== Russia ==
- Penza, 1974.

== United States ==
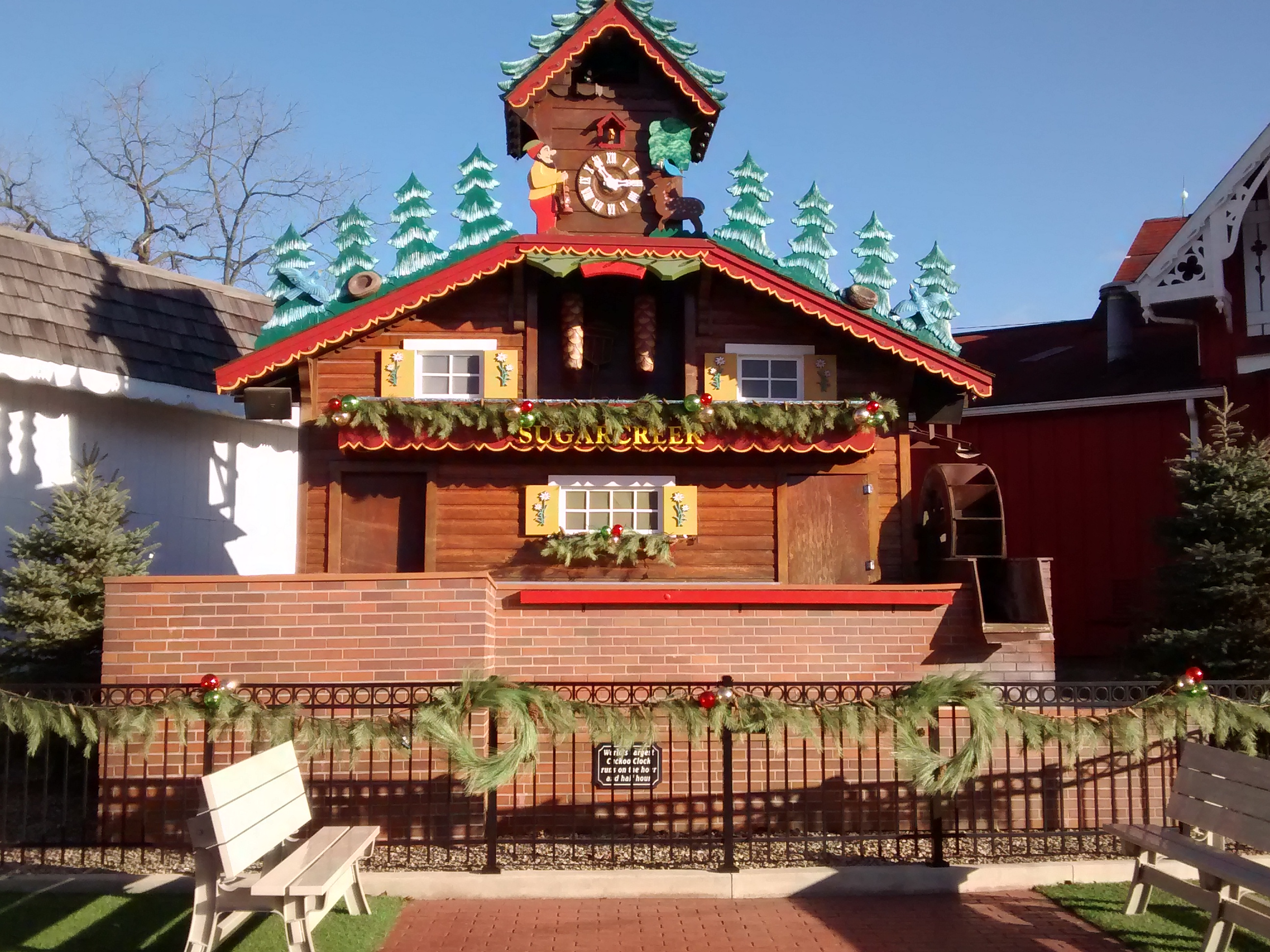
Sugarcreek, OH. Featured on the cover of the Guinness Book of Records in 1977.

- Sugarcreek, Ohio, 1972, at the intersection of Main and Broadway Street. It is over 23 feet tall and 24 feet wide.
- Douglasville, Georgia, 1986 (indoor). This clock was commissioned by Jerry Champion, owner of Champ's Clock Shop, in 1986. The manufacturer was Dold Exquisit and they had a retail location in Triberg Germany. Over 13 feet tall, it was made in the Black Forest and handcarved by Alfons Dold from German Black Forest trees.
- Sturbridge, Massachusetts, the Cuckoo Clock Shed at The Bird Store and More. Advertised as the largest cuckoo clock in New England.

== See also ==
- List of largest clock faces
- List of tallest clock towers
