= Ella May Dunning Smith =

American author, composer, activist (1860–1934)

Ella May Smith
- Born: Ella May Dunning; March 12, 1860; Uhrichsville, Ohio, US
- Died: September 28, 1934 (aged 74); Illinois, US
- Occupations: Author, composer, pianist, activist
- Spouse: Dan Laws Smith (m. 1878)
- Children: 4

Ella May Dunning Smith (also known as Ella Mae Dunning Smith) (March 12, 1860 – September 28, 1934) was an American author, composer, pianist, and activist who was active in the settlement movement and served as the first female president of the Ohio State Music Teachers' Association.

== Biography ==
Smith was born in Uhrichsville, Ohio, to Sarah Ann Price and Rufus Libbie Dunning. She was the sixth of eight children. She married railroad employee Dan Laws Smith in 1878, and they had three sons and one daughter.

Smith studied music with Caleb Croswell, Edgar Stillman Kelley, Paula de Branco de Olivera, and M. Segund du Sape. Minstrel show operator Al G. Field planned to include several of her songs in his 1895 season.

From 1903 to 1916, Smith was president of the Columbus, Ohio, Women's Music Club. Under her guidance, it became the largest women's music club in the world, arranging for symphony orchestras from Cincinnati, Minneapolis, and New York to perform in Columbus, as well as presenting concerts in prisons, old age homes, and schools for the blind. In 1914, Smith started volunteer music programs in eight settlement houses for the poor, as part of the settlement movement. These programs grew so much that in 1928, 35 volunteer teachers gave 1,353 music lessons and raised money for scholarships. Smith taught at the Phelps Collegiate School and served as dean of the Wallace Collegiate School in Columbus.

Smith became the first female president of the Ohio State Music Teachers' Association. She was the Ohio State Journal newspaper's music critic for more than 20 years, and also wrote music criticism for the Columbus Dispatch and the New York Musical Courier. In 1916, she opened the Ella May Smith Studios in Columbus to provide music education. She often gave lectures on American music.

In March 1922, Smith and her husband traveled to England where they spent three months visiting relatives, then toured Europe for the rest of the year, and she gave talks on American music.

Smith died aged 77 on September 28, 1934, in Illinois, where she had settled with her husband, who predeceased her by a few months.

== Songs ==
- "Lilacs"
- "Many a Beauteous Flower" (text by Eugene Field)
- "Philip's Mother"
