= Garaway Local School District =

School district in Ohio

Address
- 146 Dover Road Northwest Sugarcreek, Tuscarawas County, Ohio, 44681; United States
- Coordinates: 40.50768°N 81.64004°W

District information
- Grades: K through 12
- Established: 1960; 66 years ago
- President: Rob Coburn
- Vice-president: Dick Marshall
- Superintendent: James Millet
- Budget: $13,319,000 (2015-16)
- NCES District ID: 3905027

Students and staff
- Students: 1,159
- Teachers: 67.53 FTE
- Staff: 177.52 FTE
- Student–teacher ratio: 17.16
- Athletic conference: Inter-Valley Conference
- District mascot: Pirates
- Colors: Red; Royal Blue; White

Other information
- Annual spending/student: $10,368
- Website: www.garaway.org
- Location of district office (pin icon) in Tuscarawas County, shown in red (click to enlarge)

Garaway Local School District is an Ohio consolidated public school district serving the towns of Sugarcreek, Baltic, Ragersville, Dundee, Fiat and Barrs Mills. Garaway is a member of the Inter-Valley Conference (IVC) along with East Canton, Hiland, Malvern, Newcomerstown, Ridgewood, Sandy Valley, Strasburg and Tuscarawas Central Catholic. Their mascot is the Pirates.

The district occupies five buildings: one junior high/high school (located in Sugarcreek) which houses grades 7-12, and four elementary schools located in Sugarcreek (Miller Avenue), Baltic, Ragersville and Dundee. The district is bordered by Fairless and Strasburg to the north, Dover and New Philadelphia to the east, Ridgewood to the south, River View and East Holmes to the west. In the 2008-2009 Ohio Department of Education School Report Card, the district was designated Excellent meeting 29 of the 30 academic requirements.

== District History ==
In 1960, Sugarcreek, Shanesville, Baltic, Ragersville and Dundee consolidated to create the Garaway Local School District. The merge was a part of the state's plan to combine small school districts. The name of the district was created by combining parts of the names of each district township (Sugar, Auburn and Wayne).

In 1990 the high school added a new gymnasium, locker rooms and several classrooms.

Prior to 1991 grades 6-8 were held in the Baltic Elementary building. Today, grades 7-8 are held jointly in the high school building and grade 6 was re-incorporated into each of the four elementary schools.

== Administration ==
=== District Administration ===
- District Superintendent - Dr. James Millet
- High School/Junior High Principal - Tom Haas
- Miller Ave Elementary Principal - Sara Roach
- Baltic Elementary Principal - Sedric Gerber
- Ragersville Elementary Principal - Sedric Gerber
- Dundee Elementary Principal - Sara Roach
- Athletic Director/Asst. Principal - Chip Amicone
- Director of Student Services - Curtis Fisher
- Curriculum, Testing, Virtual Learning Coordinator - Charles Zobel
- District Psychologist - Cindy Weiss and Toni Horn
- IT Tech - Jake Murray and Troy Caldwell
- District Safety Dog - Sailor
- Speech Pathologist - Annabelle Raber
- Attendance Officer/Security Official - Jason Wallick
- Treasurer - Sheryl Hardesty
- Assistant To The Treasurer - David Yoder
- Transportation Coordinator - Kevin Roberts
- Food and Nutrition Coordinator - Scott Sauernheimer

=== Board of education ===
- James Miller, President
- Mike Warkall
- Mark Blauch
- Bob Hannon
- Angela Tango
- Dr. James Millet, Superintendent

== Athletics ==
=== State championships ===
- Boys Golf – 2004, 2007 and 2008

=== Runner Up ===
- Boys Basketball - 2003, 2008
- Girls Basketball - 1994, 2008
- Girls (Cross Country) - 2014
- Girls (Golf) - 2022, 2023

== Notable alumni ==
- Schumaker, Robert P. (1992) - professor of computer science at University of Texas at Tyler, founder and director of the Data Analytics Lab in the Soules College of Business
- Jason Andreas (1999) - member of 2000 National Champion Michigan State University Spartans men's basketball team <https://basketball.realgm.com/ncaa/conferences/Big-Ten-Conference/2/Michigan-State/100/Rosters/2000?
- Joel Honigford (2017) - member of 2022 Big Ten Champion University of Michigan Wolverines football team <https://mgoblue.com/sports/football/roster/joel-honigford/23067>
- Joe Hartzler (2000) - actor - appeared in Key and Peele and several prime-time commercials <https://www.imdb.com/name/nm2680362/>

== See also ==
- East Central Ohio ESC
