= Cody Garbrandt =

American mixed martial artist (born 1991)

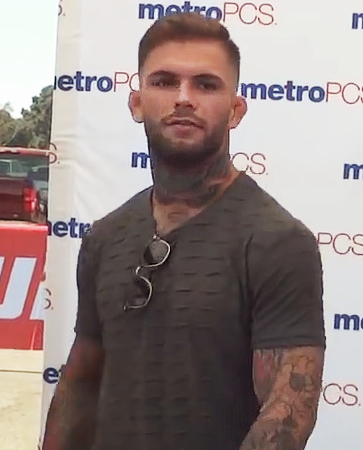
- Cody Garbrandt during UFC 199 fight week in June 2016
- Born: Cody Ray Allen Garbrandt; July 7, 1991 (age 35); Uhrichsville, Ohio, U.S.
- Nickname: No Love
- Height: 5 ft 7 in (170 cm)
- Weight: 135 lb (61 kg; 9 st 9 lb)
- Division: Flyweight (2021); Bantamweight (2012; 2014–2021, 2022–present); Featherweight (2013)
- Reach: 65 1/2 in (166 cm)
- Fighting out of: Sacramento, California, U.S. Uhrichsville, Ohio, U.S.
- Team: Strong Style (formerly); Team Alpha Male (2013–2019); Mark Henry MMA (2019–2021); Xtreme Couture (2022–present)
- Wrestling: NCAA Division II Wrestling
- Years active: 2012–present

Mixed martial arts record
- Total: 23
- Wins: 15
- By knockout: 11
- By decision: 4
- Losses: 8
- By knockout: 5
- By submission: 1
- By decision: 2

Amateur record
- Total: 8
- Wins: 6
- By knockout: 5
- By decision: 1
- Losses: 2
- By knockout: 1
- By submission: 1

Other information
- Mixed martial arts record from Sherdog

Cody Ray Allen Garbrandt (born July 7, 1991) is an American professional mixed martial artist. He currently competes in the Bantamweight division of the Ultimate Fighting Championship (UFC), where he is a former UFC Bantamweight Champion.

== Background ==
Garbrandt was born in Uhrichsville, Ohio, on July 7, 1991, and raised there mostly by his mother Jessica. Cody is ten months younger than his brother Zach, who he grew up constantly fighting. Garbrandt has claimed in several interviews that his drug addict father was never in the picture, spending most of his life in prison. Garbrandt's parents separated after a domestic abuse incident when Cody was one year old. Eventually, Cody was adopted by his mother's now ex-husband at the age of 10.

At the ages of four and five, Cody and Zach, respectively, had already been dabbling into boxing with their uncle Robert Meese who was an Olympic alternate in the sport. However, their mother was concerned about the boys becoming punch-drunk thus forbidding boxing and directing them towards wrestling.

At Claymont High School, Garbrandt competed in wrestling and football, winning a state championship as a freshman in 2007, by defeating Zach Neibert, 4–2, and was a runner-up in 2008. In football, Garbrandt won All–State honors as a linebacker during his junior season. After failing to claim the second state championship, Garbrandt became the NHSCA Sophomore National runner–up and subsequently stopped wrestling and convinced his mother to let him start training boxing seriously. Over about six years, Garbrandt compiled a 32–0 record as an amateur boxer.

Despite not competing in wrestling during his final two years of high school, Garbrandt competed at the national tournament as a senior and placed fifth, claiming All–American honors and receiving interest from several NCAA Division I schools, such as Penn State and Rutgers. He was then recruited by the Michigan State Spartans, but due to academic reasons, he ended up at Newberry College, a Division II school, before dropping out for academic and personal reasons, explaining:

“I guess my heart wasn’t into (wrestling) anymore. I was doing boxing, and that’s what I wanted to do.”

After dropping out, Garbrandt sold marijuana, worked as a bouncer, and eventually completed coal miner training in order to work in the field familiar to his family. However, he decided to commit completely to his amateur MMA career, after helping several MMA camps with wrestling.

== Mixed martial arts career ==
=== Early career ===
Garbrandt ended up taking his first amateur bout in 2009 and compiled an amateur MMA record of 6–2 before making his professional debut in 2012. Prior to his finish of James Porter in May 2014, he moved from Ohio to Sacramento, California to train at Team Alpha Male in an attempt to further his career.

After a first-round finish of Charles Sanford in October 2014, he signed with the Ultimate Fighting Championship in the fall of 2014.

=== Ultimate Fighting Championship ===
Garbrandt made his promotional debut against Marcus Brimage on January 3, 2015, at UFC 182. He won the fight via TKO in the third round.

Garbrandt faced Henry Briones on July 11, 2015, at UFC 189. He won the fight by unanimous decision, going the distance for the first time in his professional career.

Garbrandt was expected to face long-time veteran John Lineker on February 21, 2016, at UFC Fight Night 83. However, Lineker pulled out of the fight during the week, after contracting Dengue Fever, and he was replaced by Augusto Mendes. Garbrandt won the fight via TKO in the first round.

Garbrandt faced fellow undefeated prospect Thomas Almeida on May 29, 2016, headlining UFC Fight Night 88. He won the fight by knockout in the first round and also earned a Performance of the Night bonus.

Garbrandt next faced Takeya Mizugaki on August 20, 2016, at UFC 202. He won the fight via TKO in the opening minute of the first round.

==== UFC Bantamweight Championship ====
Garbrandt faced Dominick Cruz for the UFC Bantamweight Championship on December 30, 2016, at UFC 207. Garbrandt won the fight by unanimous decision after knocking Cruz down twice and nearly finishing him in the fourth round.

In January 2017, the UFC announced that Garbrandt would be one of the coaches on The Ultimate Fighter 25 opposite former UFC Bantamweight champion (and former Team Alpha Male teammate) T.J. Dillashaw, with the two expected to face each other on July 8, 2017, at UFC 213. However, the bout was scrapped on May 23, after Garbrandt sustained a back injury. The bout was rescheduled and eventually took place on November 4, 2017, at UFC 217. Despite knocking him down at the end of the first, Dillashaw rallied in the second round and defeated Garbrandt via technical knockout, marking his first loss in his professional career and losing the title. Garbrandt then faced T.J. Dillashaw in a rematch for the UFC Bantamweight Championship on August 4, 2018, at UFC 227. He lost the fight via knockout in the first round.

==== Post-UFC Championship ====
Garbrandt made his return against Pedro Munhoz on March 2, 2019 at UFC 235. In a frenetic and short bout, Garbrandt was knocked out in the first round. Both participants received the Fight of the Night bonus award.

Garbrandt was scheduled to face Raphael Assunção as the co-main event on March 28, 2020 at UFC on ESPN 8. However, Garbrandt pulled out of the fight on March 12 due to kidney problems. Instead the pair fought each other on June 6, 2020 at UFC 250. Garbrandt got back into the winning column in big fashion, winning the bout via one-punch knockout in the second round. This win earned him the Performance of the Night.

On August 7, 2020, it was announced that Garbrandt intended to move down a division (from bantamweight to flyweight) and was scheduled to face Deiveson Figueiredo for the UFC flyweight championship on November 21, 2020, at UFC 255. However, it was reported on October 2, 2020 that Garbrandt had to pull out of the contest. Garbrandt later revealed he tested positive for COVID-19 on August 29, 2020, as well as suffering from thrombosis, brain fog, and pneumonia.

Following his illness, Garbrandt returned at bantamweight and faced Rob Font on May 22, 2021 in the main event at UFC Fight Night: Font vs. Garbrandt. He lost the bout via unanimous decision.

==== Move to Flyweight ====
Garbrandt made his Flyweight debut against Kai Kara-France on December 11, 2021 at UFC 269. He lost the fight via TKO in the first round.

==== Return to Bantamweight ====
Garbrandt was scheduled to face Rani Yahya on July 9, 2022, at UFC on ESPN 39. However, Yahya withdrew in mid June due to a neck injury. The bout with Yahya was rescheduled and was expected to take place on October 1, 2022 at UFC Fight Night 211. In turn, Yahya withdrew again in mid-September for unknown reasons. While seeking a new opponent, Garbrandt also suffered a training injury, pulling him from the card.

Garbrandt was scheduled to face Julio Arce on March 4, 2023 at UFC 285. However, Arce withdrew in late January due to a knee injury. and he was replaced by Trevin Jones. He won the fight via unanimous decision.

Garbrandt was scheduled to face Mario Bautista on August 19, 2023 at UFC 292. However, Garbrandt withdrew a week before the event due to injury, and was replaced by Da'Mon Blackshear.

Garbrandt faced Brian Kelleher on December 16, 2023 at UFC 296. He won the fight via knockout in the first round.

Garbrandt faced Deiveson Figueiredo on April 13, 2024, at UFC 300. He lost the fight by rear-naked choke submission in the second round, marking his first loss by submission.

Garbrandt was scheduled to face Miles Johns on October 12, 2024 at UFC Fight Night 244. However, the bout was moved to UFC Fight Night 247 on November 9, 2024, for unknown reasons. In turn, Garbrandt withdrew from the bout due to undisclosed reasons and the bout was scrapped.

Garbrandt faced Raoni Barcelos on June 14, 2025, at UFC on ESPN 69. He lost the fight by unanimous decision.

Garbrandt faced Xiao Long on March 7, 2026 at UFC 326. After Long was deducted two points in the third round for multiple groin strikes, Garbrandt won the fight by unanimous decision.

Garbrandt faced Adrian Yañez on July 11, 2026, at UFC 329. He lost the fight by technical knockout in the first round.

== Freestyle wrestling ==
Garbrandt is scheduled to make his Real American Freestyle debut against Sergio Pettis on November 28, 2026 at RAF 15.

== Personal life ==
During Garbrandt's run with the MMA promotion Pinnacle FC, he met and began dating Danny Pimsanguan. The couple eventually married in July 2017. In October, the couple announced they were expecting their first child. In March 2018, the couple announced the birth of their son. Garbrandt announced in 2023 that he and his wife have divorced. He has a daughter with his girlfriend.

== Championships and accomplishments ==
=== Mixed martial arts ===
- Ultimate Fighting Championship
  - UFC Bantamweight Championship (One time)
  - Performance of the Night (Two times) vs. Thomas Almeida and Raphael Assunção
  - Fight of the Night (Two times) vs. Dominick Cruz and Pedro Munhoz
  - Tied (Petr Yan) for third most knockdowns in UFC Bantamweight division history (10)
    - Tied (Chuck Liddell, Quinton Jackson, Josh Emmett, Montel Jackson & Ilia Topuria) for most consecutive fights with a knockdown landed in UFC history (7)
  - UFC Honors Awards
    - 2020: President's Choice Performance of the Year Nominee vs. Raphael Assunção & Fan's Choice Knockout of the Year Nominee vs. Raphael Assunção
  - UFC.com Awards
    - 2019: Ranked #8 Fight of the Year vs. Pedro Munhoz
    - 2020: Ranked #2 Knockout of the Year vs. Raphael Assunção & Half-Year Awards: Best Knockout of the 1HY
- Cage Pages
  - 2016 UFC Fighter of the Year
- theScore
  - 2016 Fighter of the Year with Amanda Nunes
- Forbes
  - 2016 UFC Breakthrough Fighter of the Year
- Sports Illustrated
  - 2016 #2 Ranked Fighter of the Year
- MMA Junkie
  - 2016 Fighter of the Year
  - 2020 June Knockout of the Month vs. Raphael Assunção
- Pundit Arena
  - 2017 Fight of the Year vs. T.J. Dillashaw
- MMADNA.nl
  - 2016 Rising Star of the Year
- World MMA Awards
  - 2016 Breakthrough Fighter of the Year
- CBS Sports
  - 2016 #8 Ranked UFC Fighter of the Year
  - 2017 #3 Ranked UFC Fight of the Year vs. T.J. Dillashaw
  - 2020 #2 Ranked UFC Knockout of the Year vs. Raphael Assunção
- Combat Press
  - 2016 Breakout Fighter of the Year
  - 2023 Comeback Fighter of the Year
- Fightland
  - 2016 Gameplan of the Year vs. Dominick Cruz at UFC 207

=== Folkstyle wrestling ===
- National High School Coaches Association
  - NHSCA Sophomore National Runner-up out of Ohio (2008)
  - NHSCA Senior National 5th place out of Ohio (2010)
  - NHSCA All American (2008, 2010)
- Ohio High School Athletic Association
  - OHSAA 112 lb DII State Champion out of Claymont High School (2007)
  - OHSAA 119 lb DII State Runner-up out of Claymont High School (2008)
- NCAA Division II Wrestler out of Newberry College

=== Boxing ===
- Undefeated 32-0 in amateur boxing record

== Mixed martial arts record ==
Professional record breakdown
23 matches	15 wins	8 losses
By knockout	11	5
By submission	0	1
By decision	4	2

Res.	Record	Opponent	Method	Event	Date	Round	Time	Location	Notes
Loss	15–8	Adrian Yañez	TKO (punches)	UFC 329	July 11, 2026	1	2:47	Las Vegas, Nevada, United States	
Win	15–7	Xiao Long	Decision (unanimous)	UFC 326	March 7, 2026	3	5:00	Las Vegas, Nevada, United States	Xiao was deducted two points in round 3 due to multiple illegal groin strikes.
Loss	14–7	Raoni Barcelos	Decision (unanimous)	UFC on ESPN: Usman vs. Buckley	June 14, 2025	3	5:00	Atlanta, Georgia, United States	
Loss	14–6	Deiveson Figueiredo	Submission (rear-naked choke)	UFC 300	April 13, 2024	2	4:02	Las Vegas, Nevada, United States	
Win	14–5	Brian Kelleher	KO (punch)	UFC 296	December 16, 2023	1	3:42	Las Vegas, Nevada, United States	
Win	13–5	Trevin Jones	Decision (unanimous)	UFC 285	March 4, 2023	3	5:00	Las Vegas, Nevada, United States	Return to Bantamweight.
Loss	12–5	Kai Kara-France	TKO (punches)	UFC 269	December 11, 2021	1	3:21	Las Vegas, Nevada, United States	Flyweight debut.
Loss	12–4	Rob Font	Decision (unanimous)	UFC Fight Night: Font vs. Garbrandt	May 22, 2021	5	5:00	Las Vegas, Nevada, United States	
Win	12–3	Raphael Assunção	KO (punch)	UFC 250	June 6, 2020	2	4:59	Las Vegas, Nevada, United States	Performance of the Night.
Loss	11–3	Pedro Munhoz	TKO (punches)	UFC 235	March 2, 2019	1	4:51	Las Vegas, Nevada, United States	Fight of the Night.
Loss	11–2	T.J. Dillashaw	KO (knee and punches)	UFC 227	August 4, 2018	1	4:10	Los Angeles, California, United States	For the UFC Bantamweight Championship.
Loss	11–1	T.J. Dillashaw	TKO (punches)	UFC 217	November 4, 2017	2	2:41	New York City, New York, United States	Lost the UFC Bantamweight Championship.
Win	11–0	Dominick Cruz	Decision (unanimous)	UFC 207	December 30, 2016	5	5:00	Las Vegas, Nevada, United States	Won the UFC Bantamweight Championship. Fight of the Night.
Win	10–0	Takeya Mizugaki	TKO (punches)	UFC 202	August 20, 2016	1	0:48	Las Vegas, Nevada, United States	
Win	9–0	Thomas Almeida	KO (punches)	UFC Fight Night: Almeida vs. Garbrandt	May 29, 2016	1	2:53	Las Vegas, Nevada, United States	Performance of the Night.
Win	8–0	Augusto Mendes	KO (punches)	UFC Fight Night: Cowboy vs. Cowboy	February 21, 2016	1	4:18	Pittsburgh, Pennsylvania, United States	Catchweight (142 lb) bout; Mendes missed weight.
Win	7–0	Henry Briones	Decision (unanimous)	UFC 189	July 11, 2015	3	5:00	Las Vegas, Nevada, United States	
Win	6–0	Marcus Brimage	TKO (punches)	UFC 182	January 3, 2015	3	4:50	Las Vegas, Nevada, United States	
Win	5–0	Charles Stanford	TKO (punches)	North American Allied Fight Series: Rock N Rumble 8	October 4, 2014	1	1:37	Canton, Ohio, United States	
Win	4–0	James Porter	TKO (punches)	Pinnacle FC: Pittsburgh Challenge Series 7	May 24, 2014	1	2:17	Pittsburgh, Pennsylvania, United States	
Win	3–0	Dominic Mazzotta	TKO (punches)	Gladiators of the Cage: The North Shore's Rise to Power 4	March 15, 2014	2	0:32	Pittsburgh, Pennsylvania, United States	Return to Bantamweight.
Win	2–0	Shane Manley	KO (punches)	Pinnacle FC: Pittsburgh Challenge Series 5	November 27, 2013	1	3:57	Canonsburg, Pennsylvania, United States	Featherweight debut.
Win	1–0	Charles Kessinger	TKO (punches)	Pinnacle FC: Pittsburgh Challenge Series 1	December 29, 2012	1	4:11	Canonsburg, Pennsylvania, United States	Bantamweight debut.

== Pay-per-view bouts ==
No	Event	Fight	Date	Venue	City	PPV buys
1.	UFC 227	Dillashaw vs. Garbrandt 2	August 4, 2018	Staples Center	Los Angeles, California, United States	300,000

== See also ==
- List of current UFC fighters
- Ultimate Fighting Championship Pound for Pound rankings

Achievements
Preceded by Dominick Cruz	5th UFC Bantamweight Champion; December 30, 2016 – November 4, 2017	Succeeded by T.J. Dillashaw
