= Strasburg-Franklin High School =

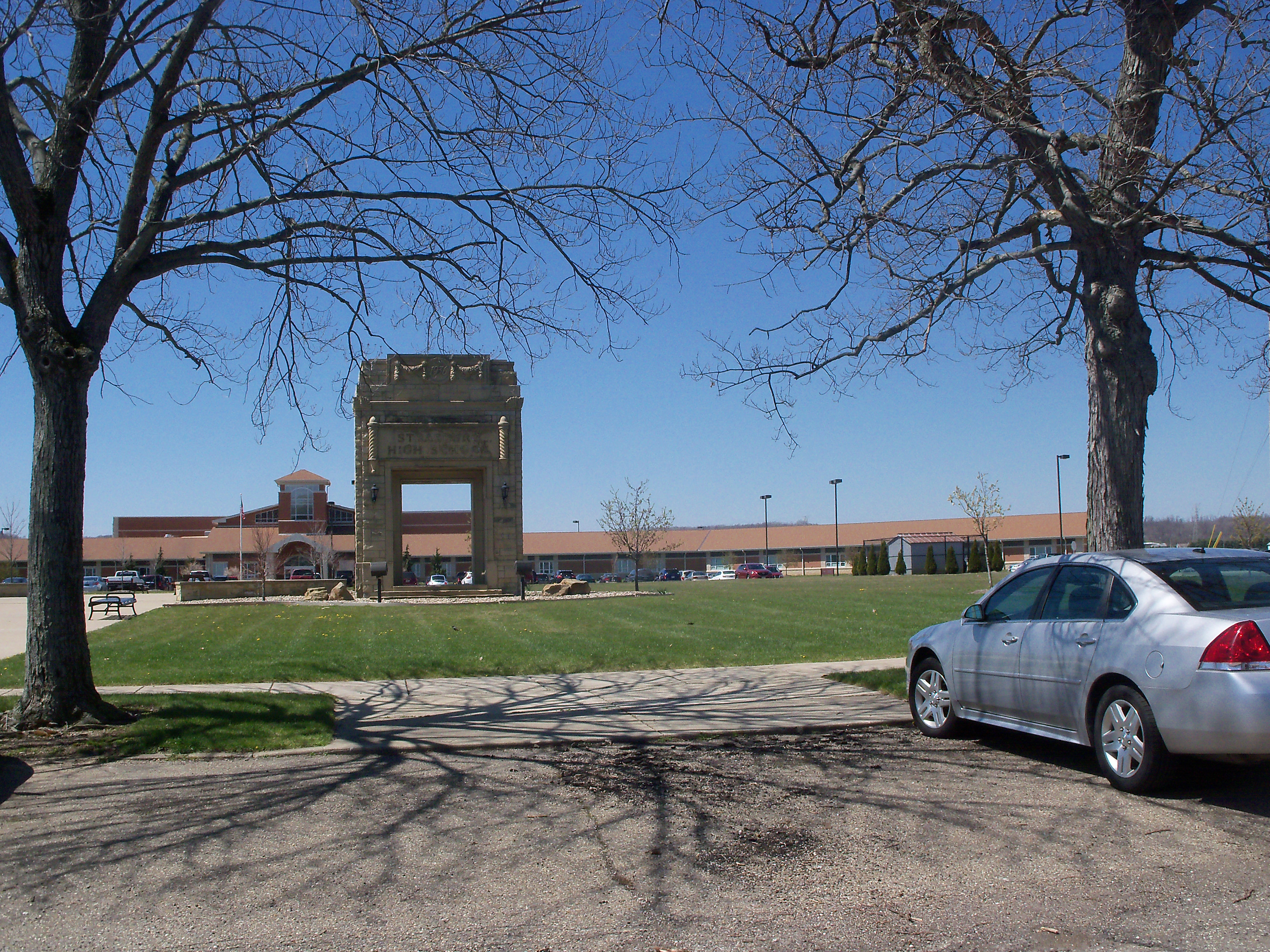

Location
- 140 N Bodmer Ave; Strasburg, Tuscarawas County, Ohio 44680; United States
- Coordinates: 40°35′.985″N 81°31′.85″W

Information
- Type: Public, Coeducational high school
- Superintendent: Vince Lindsey
- NCES School ID: 390502903904
- Principal: Frank Kruger
- Teaching staff: 18.00 (FTE)
- Grades: 6-12
- Enrollment: 257 (2024-25)
- Average class size: 30
- Student to teacher ratio: 14.28
- Colors: Black & orange
- Athletics conference: Inter-Valley Conference
- Team name: Tigers
- Athletic Director: Gary Spinell
- Website: http://www.strasburg.k12.oh.us

Strasburg-Franklin High School is a public high school in Strasburg, Ohio. It is the only high school in the Strasburg-Franklin Local School District. Athletic teams are known as the Tigers, and they compete as a member of the Ohio High School Athletic Association in the Inter-Valley Conference.

== History ==
The first public school in Strasburg was constructed in 1881 at a cost of $5000, and was located on South Wooster Avenue. This building has since been demolished and the current buildings reside at 140 N Bodmer Avenue.

The first school building in the current location was built in 1912. A new high school was finished in 1939 some yards to the north of the old building. In 1957, two additions were opened, one linking the existing buildings, and the other housing new classrooms on the south end of the 1912 building. The older building housed K-6, a small gymnasium, and elementary school offices. The 1939 building housed 7-12. The connecting addition housed school district administrators, high school principal, a gymnasium, cafeteria, band rooms, industrial education, and art facilities. All these buildings were demolished by 2012.

State and local funding was appropriated to construct new buildings just west of the old buildings. The first building opened in 2007. The second building, housing the high school and connected to the first building, opened in 2010 using funds from the Tobacco Master Settlement Agreement. Local boosters are raising funds to finish athletic and other facilities prohibited by state law from using state funding to construct.

== Athletics ==
Strasburg-Franklin currently offers:

- Baseball
- Basketball
- Cross country
- Cheerleading
- Football
- Golf
- Softball
- Track and field
- Volleyball

=== State championships ===
- Boys' basketball – 1967
- Girls' basketball – 2026
- Girls' softball – 1987, 1988, 1989, 1991, 2009, 2011, 2013, 2022, 2023, 2024
