= Sugarcreek, Ohio =

- Village
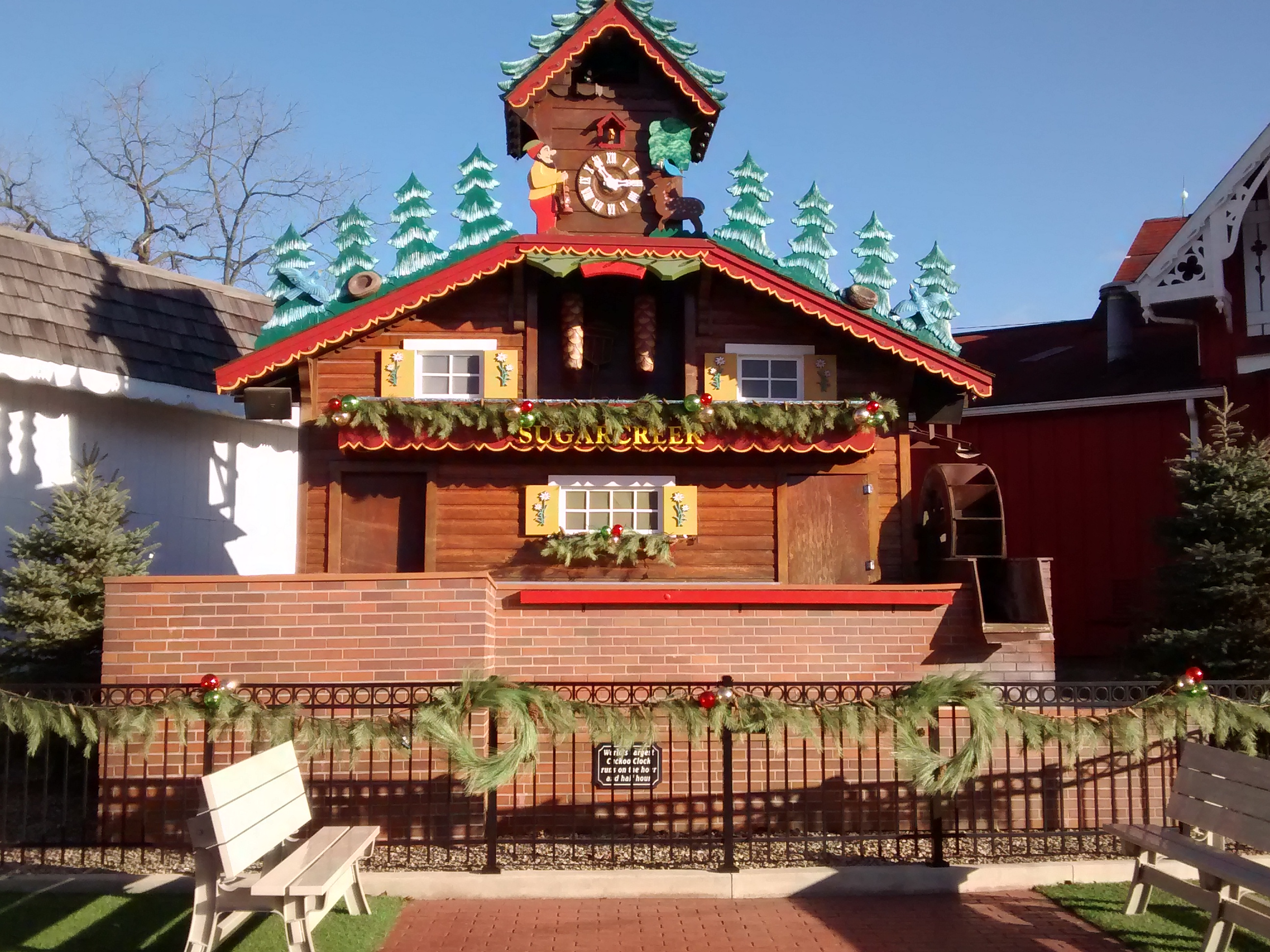
- World's Largest Cuckoo Clock
- Nickname: The Little Switzerland of Ohio
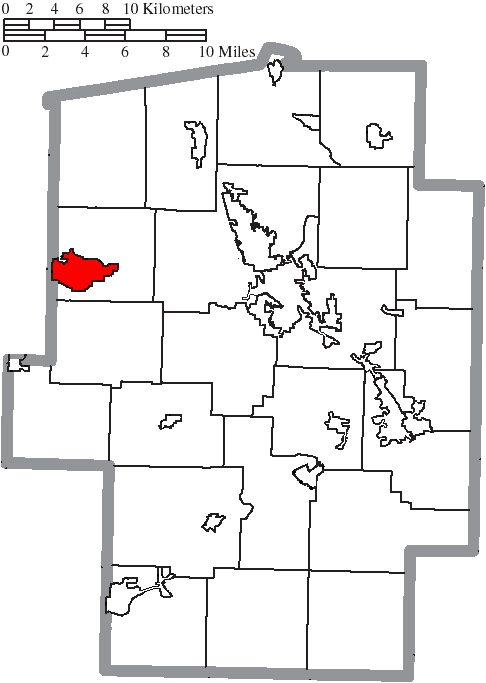
- Location of Sugarcreek in Tuscarawas County, Ohio

- Location within Ohio Location within the United States
- Coordinates: 40°30′24″N 81°38′20″W
- Country: United States
- State: Ohio
- County: Tuscarawas
- Township: Sugar Creek

Government
  - Type: Village

Area
  - Total: 3.80 sq mi (9.84 km^{2})
  - Land: 3.80 sq mi (9.84 km^{2})
  - Water: 0 sq mi (0.00 km^{2})
- Elevation: 1,063 ft (324 m)

Population (2020)
  - Total: 2,373
  - Density: 624.4/sq mi (241.08/km^{2})
- Time zone: UTC-5 (Eastern (EST))
  - Summer (DST): UTC-4 (EDT)
- ZIP code: 44681
- Area code: 330
- FIPS code: 39-75210
- GNIS feature ID: 2399927
- Website: https://visitsugarcreek.com/

Sugarcreek is a village in Tuscarawas County, Ohio, United States. The population was 2,373 at the 2020 census. It is known as "The Little Switzerland of Ohio". Located in Ohio's Amish Country, the village is part of a large regional tourism industry. In the center of town stands one of the world's largest cuckoo clocks, which was previously featured on the cover of the Guinness World Records book in 1977.

== History ==
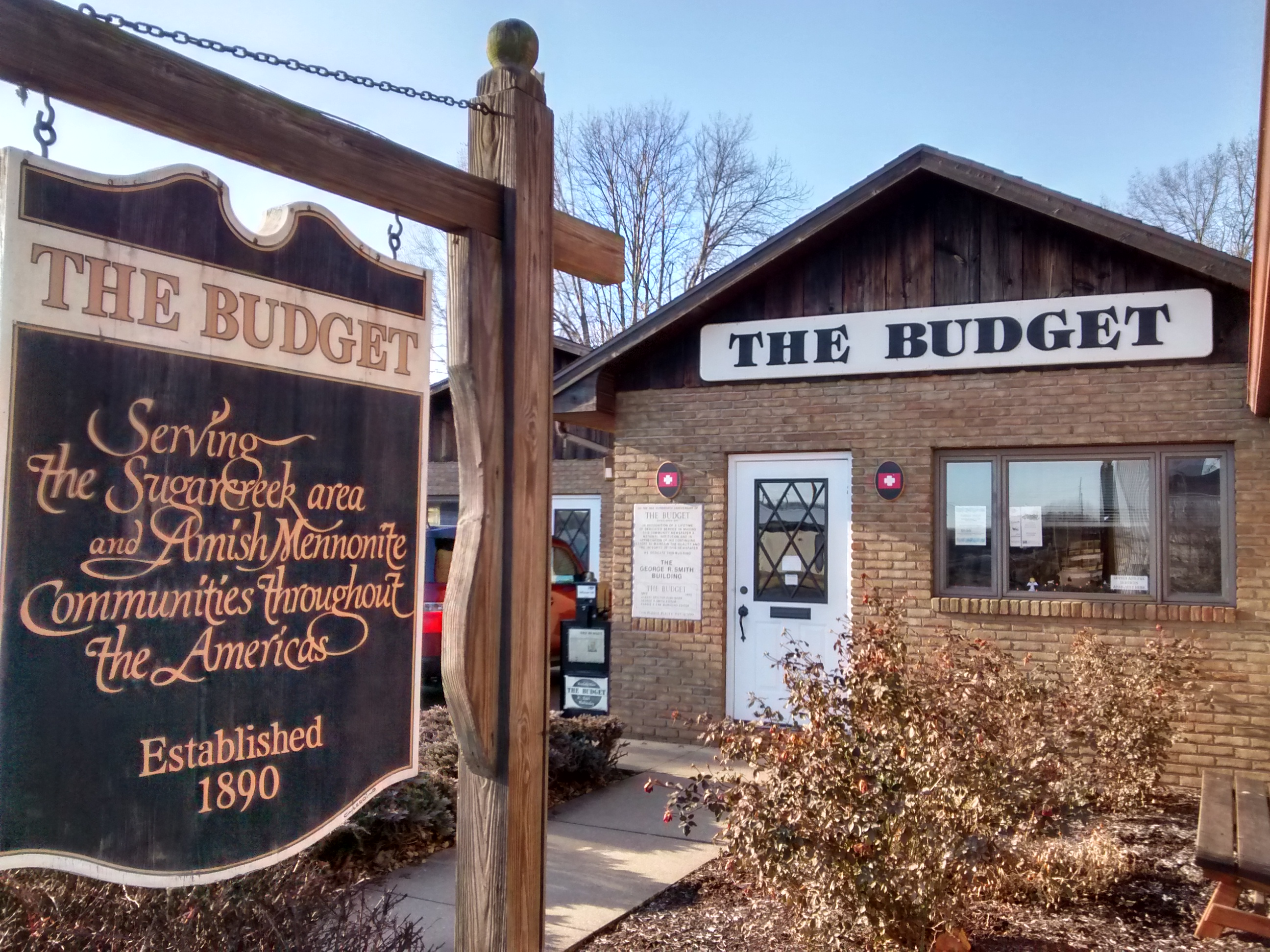
Office of The Budget

Sugarcreek's historical beginnings were rooted in cheese production. Swiss immigrants arrived in the early 1830s and used the milk from Amish dairy farms to produce their cheese. In the 1950s they created an annual Ohio Swiss Festival; the success of early festivals as an attraction for tourists resulted in local business leaders transforming the town into a Swiss village starting in 1965. By the early 1970s the first tourist-oriented businesses were opening, and the tourism industry in Sugarcreek was centered not only around the Amish but also around a steam engine passenger train operated by the Ohio Central Railroad which ran between Sugarcreek and Baltic until 2004. Since the train stopped running, tourism in Sugarcreek has decreased. Trollinger theorizes that unlike Walnut Creek and Berlin, which support a nostalgia that reassures tourists that what they are nostalgic for still exists in America and is therefore a nostalgia of hope, the Swiss theme of Sugarcreek inspires a nostalgia for something that is forever gone— that is, a historic period in which the United States was a European immigrant based white-majority country— and so does that not reassure many people.

Shanesville was founded in 1814 by Anthony Shane at the intersection of two Indian trails (currently Ohio State Routes 39 and 93). This village was surpassed in size and stature by Sugarcreek (then known as East Shanesville) when the railroads came in the mid-19th century. Shanesville was administratively merged with Sugarcreek in 1969, and took up the current name for the village.

== Geography ==
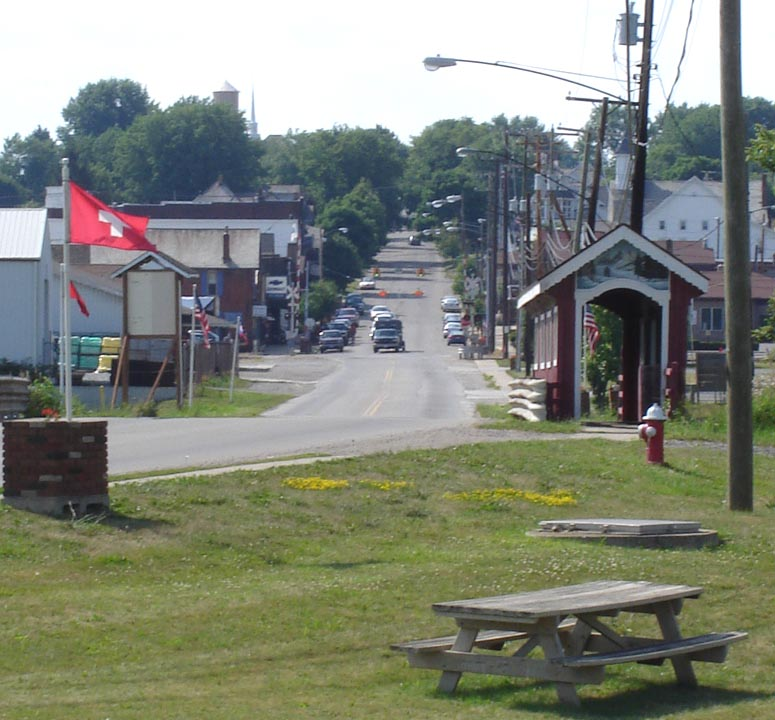
Street scene in Sugarcreek

Sugarcreek is located along the South Fork of Sugar Creek. According to the U.S. Census Bureau, the village has a total area of 3.79 square miles (9.82 km^{2}), all land.

== Demographics ==
Historical population
Census	Pop.	Note	%±
1900	243		—
1910	389		60.1%
1920	618		58.9%
1930	895		44.8%
1940	836		−6.6%
1950	889		6.3%
1960	982		10.5%
1970	1,771		80.3%
1980	1,966		11.0%
1990	2,062		4.9%
2000	2,174		5.4%
2010	2,220		2.1%
2020	2,373		6.9%

The village has a notable Amish community which is part of the greater Holmes County Amish settlement. Sugarcreek supports a Swiss heritage and Amish centered tourism industry, is the headquarters of The Budget weekly newspaper, the most important Amish newspaper, and has several large production facilities of the Belden Brick Company.

86.6% spoke English, 11.4% German, including Pennsylvania German, and 2.0% "Dutch", which in this case means Pennsylvania Dutch.

=== 2010 census ===
As of the 2010 census, there were 2,220 people, 904 households, and 652 families living in the village. The population density was 585.8 inhabitants per square mile (226.2/km^{2}). There were 967 housing units at an average density of 255.1 per square mile (98.5/km^{2}). The racial makeup of the village was 97.8% White, 0.1% African American, 0.1% Native American, 0.1% Asian, 0.7% from other races, and 1.2% from two or more races. Hispanic or Latino of any race were 1.5% of the population.

There were 904 households, of which 28.8% had children under the age of 18 living with them, 62.2% were married couples living together, 6.2% had a female householder with no husband present, 3.8% had a male householder with no wife present, and 27.9% were non-families. 25.9% of all households were made up of individuals, and 12.9% had someone living alone who was 65 years of age or older. The average household size was 2.46 and the average family size was 2.95.

The median age in the village was 40 years. 22.3% of residents were under the age of 18; 8.5% were between the ages of 18 and 24; 25% were from 25 to 44; 26.2% were from 45 to 64; and 17.9% were 65 years of age or older. The gender makeup of the village was 49.6% male and 50.4% female.

=== 2000 census ===
As of the census of 2000, there were 2,174 people, 873 households, and 639 families living in the village. The population density was 572.2 inhabitants per square mile (220.9/km^{2}). There were 923 housing units at an average density of 242.9 per square mile (93.8/km^{2}). The racial makeup of the village was 99.13% White, 0.14% African American, 0.05% Native American, 0.46% Asian, 0.05% from other races, and 0.18% from two or more races. Hispanic or Latino of any race were 0.05% of the population.

There were 873 households, out of which 33.4% had children under the age of 18 living with them, 66.0% were married couples living together, 4.9% had a female householder with no husband present, and 26.8% were non-families. 25.5% of all households were made up of individuals, and 15.0% had someone living alone who was 65 years of age or older. The average household size was 2.49 and the average family size was 3.00.

In the village, the population was spread out, with 25.2% under the age of 18, 8.7% from 18 to 24, 27.0% from 25 to 44, 21.2% from 45 to 64, and 17.8% who were 65 years of age or older. The median age was 38 years. For every 100 females there were 95.3 males. For every 100 women age 18 and over, there were 91.0 men.

The median income for a household in the village was $36,360, and the median income for a family was $43,707. Males had a median income of $32,068 versus $19,792 for females. The per capita income for the village was $16,107. About 6.8% of families and 7.2% of the population were below the poverty line, including 9.3% of those under age 18 and 10.2% of those age 65 or over.

== Education ==
Sugarcreek is home to the Garaway High School and Junior High. The mascot of the high school is a pirate. Sugarcreek is also home to Miller Avenue Elementary School. This is one of the four elementary schools that make up the Garaway Local School District. The other schools are Ragersville, Baltic, and Dundee elementaries.

Sugarcreek is served by a branch of the Tuscarawas County Public Library.
