= Uhrichsville, Ohio =

- City
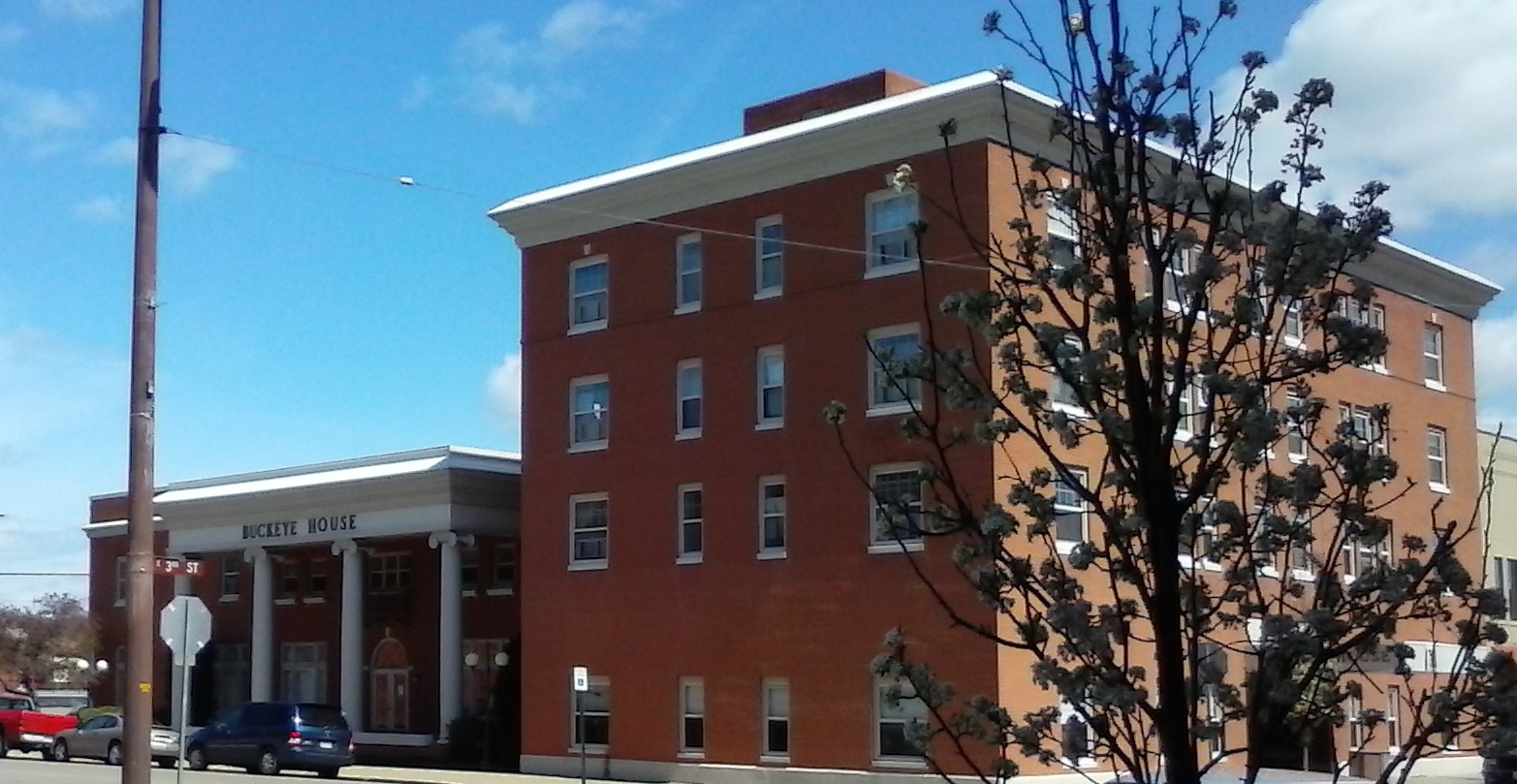
- Third Street downtown
- Nicknames: Twin Cities (see also Dennison, Ohio), Clay Capital of the World
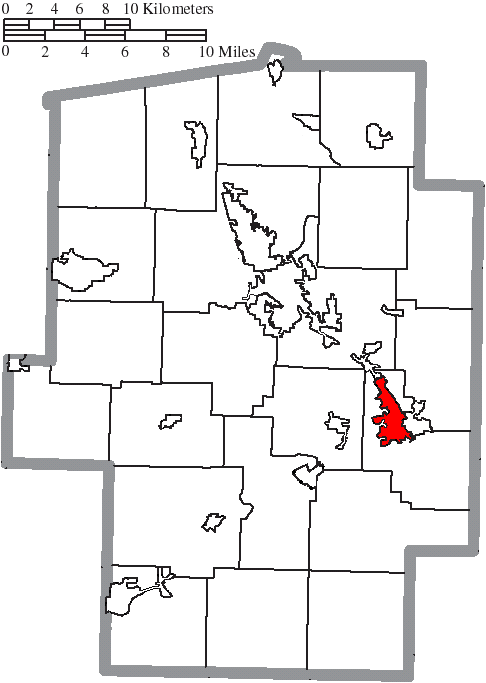
- Location of Uhrichsville in Tuscarawas County

- Location within Ohio Location within the United States
- Coordinates: 40°23′19″N 81°20′22″W
- Country: United States
- State: Ohio
- County: Tuscarawas
- Township: Mill

Area
  - Total: 2.84 sq mi (7.36 km^{2})
  - Land: 2.84 sq mi (7.35 km^{2})
  - Water: 0.0039 sq mi (0.01 km^{2})
- Elevation: 860 ft (260 m)

Population (2020)
  - Total: 5,272
  - Density: 1,857.5/sq mi (717.19/km^{2})
- Time zone: UTC-5 (Eastern (EST))
  - Summer (DST): UTC-4 (EDT)
- ZIP code: 44683
- Area code: 740
- FIPS code: 39-78176
- GNIS feature ID: 2397079
- Website: https://www.cityofuhrichsville.org/

Uhrichsville (/ˈɜːrɪksˌvɪl/ UR-iks-vil) is a city in Tuscarawas County, Ohio, United States. The population was 5,272 at the 2020 census.

Claymont City School District is the public school district of Uhrichsville and Dennison, Ohio. The twin cities is a nickname used to describe Uhrichsville and Dennison because they are adjacent.

== History ==
Although the town was laid out under the name of "Waterford" in 1833, it was informally known as "Uhrich's Mill" after Michael Uhrich, a local mill operator, and in 1839 the town was officially renamed Uhrichsville. It benefitted from the Ohio and Erie Canal and later from the Pan Handle Railroad. Railroad shops built at nearby Dennison later added further to Uhrichsville's growth.

Uhrichsville Water Park opened in June 2008. It has heated pools and features slides, waterfalls, buckets, and a water jungle-gym.

== Geography ==
The area surrounding Uhrichsville is moderately flat. According to the United States Census Bureau, the city has a total area of 2.81 square miles (7.28 km^{2}), all land.

== Transportation ==
The eastern terminus of U.S. Route 36 is located in Uhrichsville.

== Demographics ==
Historical population
Census	Pop.	Note	%±
1850	576		—
1860	646		12.2%
1870	1,541		138.5%
1880	2,790		81.1%
1890	3,842		37.7%
1900	4,582		19.3%
1910	4,751		3.7%
1920	6,428		35.3%
1930	6,437		0.1%
1940	6,435		0.0%
1950	6,614		2.8%
1960	6,201		−6.2%
1970	5,731		−7.6%
1980	6,130		7.0%
1990	5,604		−8.6%
2000	5,662		1.0%
2010	5,413		−4.4%
2020	5,272		−2.6%

=== 2020 census ===
As of the 2020 census, Uhrichsville had a population of 5,272. The median age was 37.0 years. 24.9% of residents were under the age of 18 and 16.3% of residents were 65 years of age or older. For every 100 females there were 93.3 males, and for every 100 females age 18 and over there were 88.6 males age 18 and over.

99.1% of residents lived in urban areas, while 0.9% lived in rural areas.

There were 2,172 households in Uhrichsville, of which 31.8% had children under the age of 18 living in them. Of all households, 38.1% were married-couple households, 19.3% were households with a male householder and no spouse or partner present, and 32.6% were households with a female householder and no spouse or partner present. About 32.9% of all households were made up of individuals and 15.3% had someone living alone who was 65 years of age or older.

There were 2,441 housing units, of which 11.0% were vacant. The homeowner vacancy rate was 2.2% and the rental vacancy rate was 7.5%.

Racial composition as of the 2020 census
Race	Number	Percent
White	4,908	93.1%
Black or African American	69	1.3%
American Indian and Alaska Native	15	0.3%
Asian	16	0.3%
Native Hawaiian and Other Pacific Islander	1	0.0%
Some other race	23	0.4%
Two or more races	240	4.6%
Hispanic or Latino (of any race)	92	1.7%

=== 2010 census ===
As of the census of 2010, there were 5,413 people, 2,176 households, and 1,379 families living in the city. The population density was 1,926.3 inhabitants per square mile (743.7/km^{2}). There were 2,426 housing units at an average density of 863.3 per square mile (333.3/km^{2}). The racial makeup of the city was 96.3% White, 1.4% African American, 0.1% Native American, 0.3% Asian, 0.3% from other races, and 1.6% from two or more races. Hispanic or Latino of any race were 0.8% of the population.

There were 2,176 households, of which 34.3% had children under the age of 18 living with them, 40.9% were married couples living together, 17.7% had a female householder with no husband present, 4.8% had a male householder with no wife present, and 36.6% were non-families. 30.6% of all households were made up of individuals, and 14.6% had someone living alone who was 65 years of age or older. The average household size was 2.44 and the average family size was 3.04.

The median age in the city was 36.5 years. 26.7% of residents were under the age of 18; 9.2% were between the ages of 18 and 24; 24.3% were from 25 to 44; 24.5% were from 45 to 64; and 15.3% were 65 years of age or older. The gender makeup of the city was 47.3% male and 52.7% female.

=== 2000 census ===
As of the census of 2000, there were 5,662 people, 2,254 households, and 1,498 families living in the city. The population density was 1,980.9 inhabitants per square mile (764.8/km^{2}). There were 2,523 housing units at an average density of 882.7 per square mile (340.8/km^{2}). The racial makeup of the city was 97.58% White, 1.11% African American, 0.19% Native American, 0.12% Asian, 0.09% from other races, and 0.90% from two or more races. Hispanic or Latino of any race were 0.62% of the population.

There were 2,254 households, out of which 34.2% had children under the age of 18 living with them, 47.8% were married couples living together, 14.4% had a female householder with no husband present, and 33.5% were non-families. 29.7% of all households were made up of individuals, and 15.8% had someone living alone who was 65 years of age or older. The average household size was 2.51 and the average family size was 3.08.

In the city the population was spread out, with 28.4% under the age of 18, 8.3% from 18 to 24, 28.8% from 25 to 44, 19.1% from 45 to 64, and 15.5% who were 65 years of age or older. The median age was 35 years. For every 100 females, there were 91.2 males. For every 100 females age 18 and over, there were 84.9 males.

The median income for a household in the city was $28,617, and the median income for a family was $32,217. Males had a median income of $28,138 versus $17,132 for females. The per capita income for the city was $13,144. About 12.0% of families and 14.6% of the population were below the poverty line, including 17.9% of those under age 18 and 11.0% of those age 65 or over.

== Education ==
The Claymont City School District includes Claymont High School.

== Notable people ==
- Cody Garbrandt, mixed martial artist, former UFC bantamweight champion
- Florence Wolf Gotthold, painter.
- Brett Hillyer, attorney and State Representative
- Harry McClintock ("Haywire Mac"), singer.
- Whitey Moore, Major League Baseball player
- Dean Sensanbaugher, American football player
- Ella May Dunning Smith, composer and activist
- Edwin Wolf, manufacturer and banker
- Simon Wolf, attorney and activist
