= Claymont High School =

Location
- 4205 Indian Hill Road; Uhrichsville, Ohio 44683; United States
- Coordinates: 40.414°N 81.365°W

Information
- Type: Public high school
- School district: Claymont City Schools
- NCES School ID: 390437700405
- Principal: Amy Lint Conn
- Teaching staff: 25.25 (FTE)
- Grades: 9–12
- Enrollment: 380 (2023-2024)
- Student to teacher ratio: 15.05
- Color
- Mascot: Mustangs
- Nickname: 922ers
- Rival: Indian Valley High School
- Website: www.claymontschools.org/highschool

Claymont High School is a public high school in Uhrichsville, Ohio, United States. It is part of the Claymont City Schools district.

== Ohio High School Athletic Association state championships ==
- Boys Wrestling – 1992
- Girls Basketball – 1981

== Notable alumni ==
- Cody Garbrandt (2010), professional mixed martial artist
