= Hirsau Church =

Church

Coordinates: 49°37′01″N 7°32′30″E

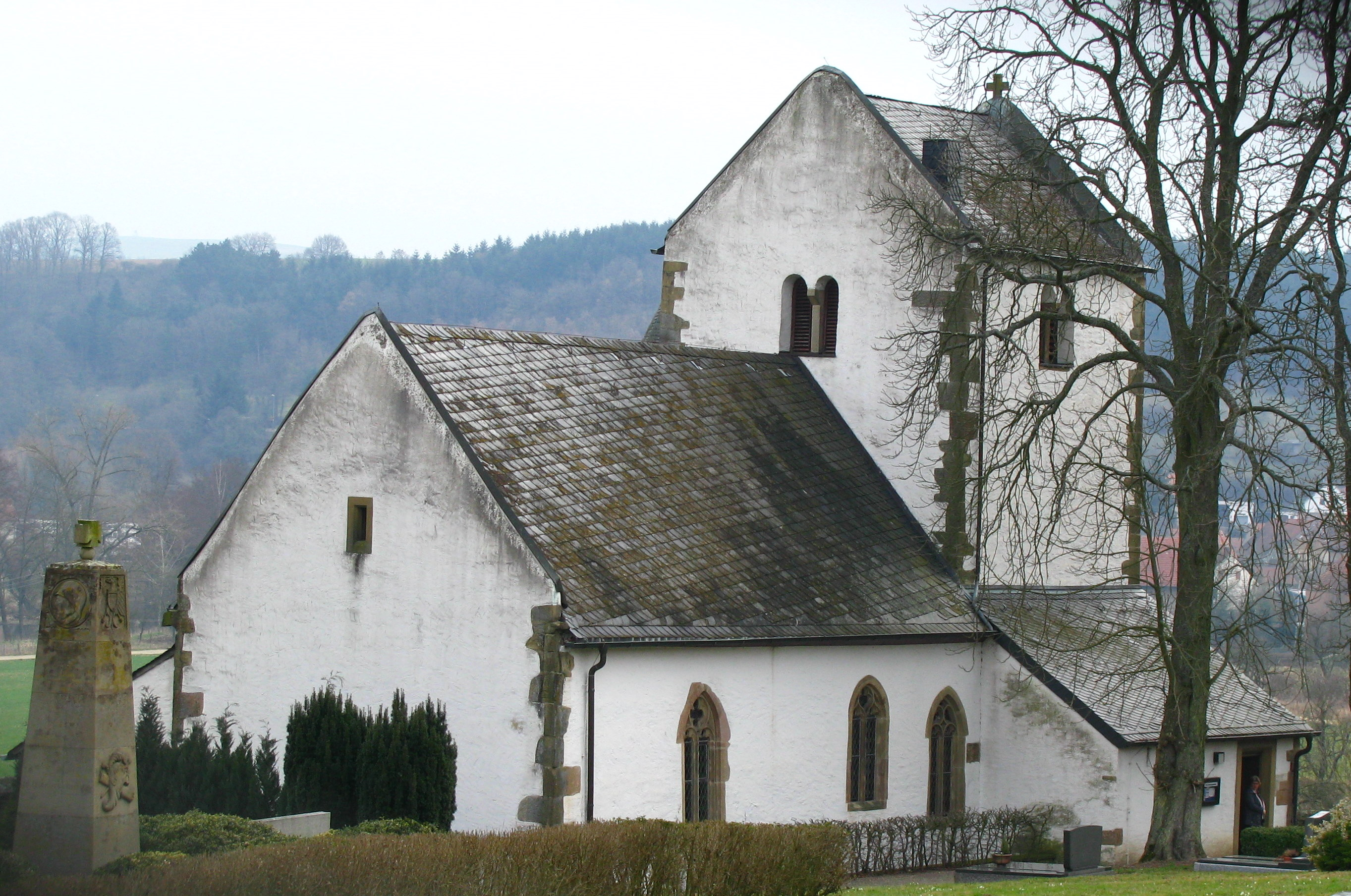
The Hirsau church near Offenbach-Hundheim

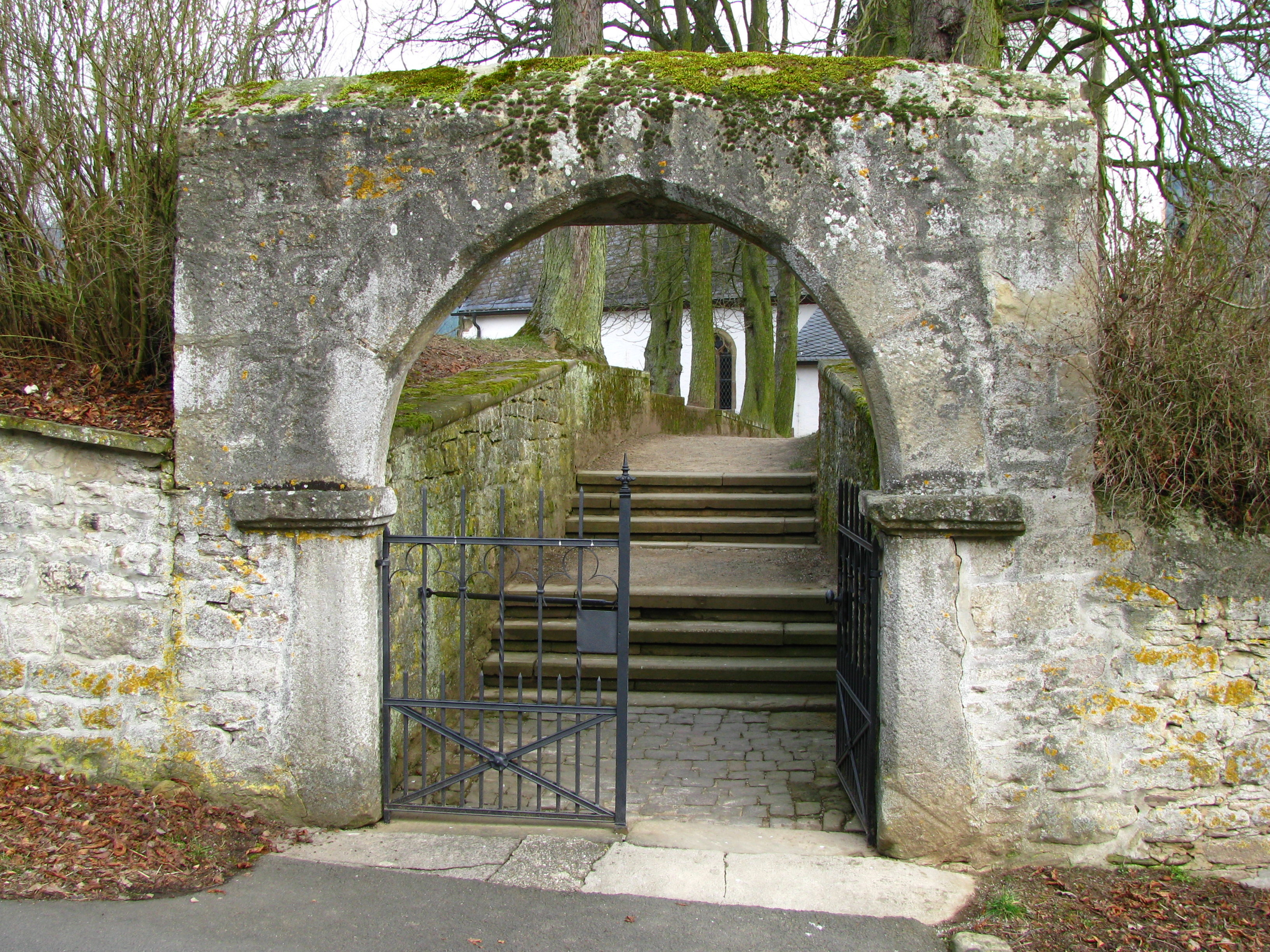
Entranceway from the 15th century

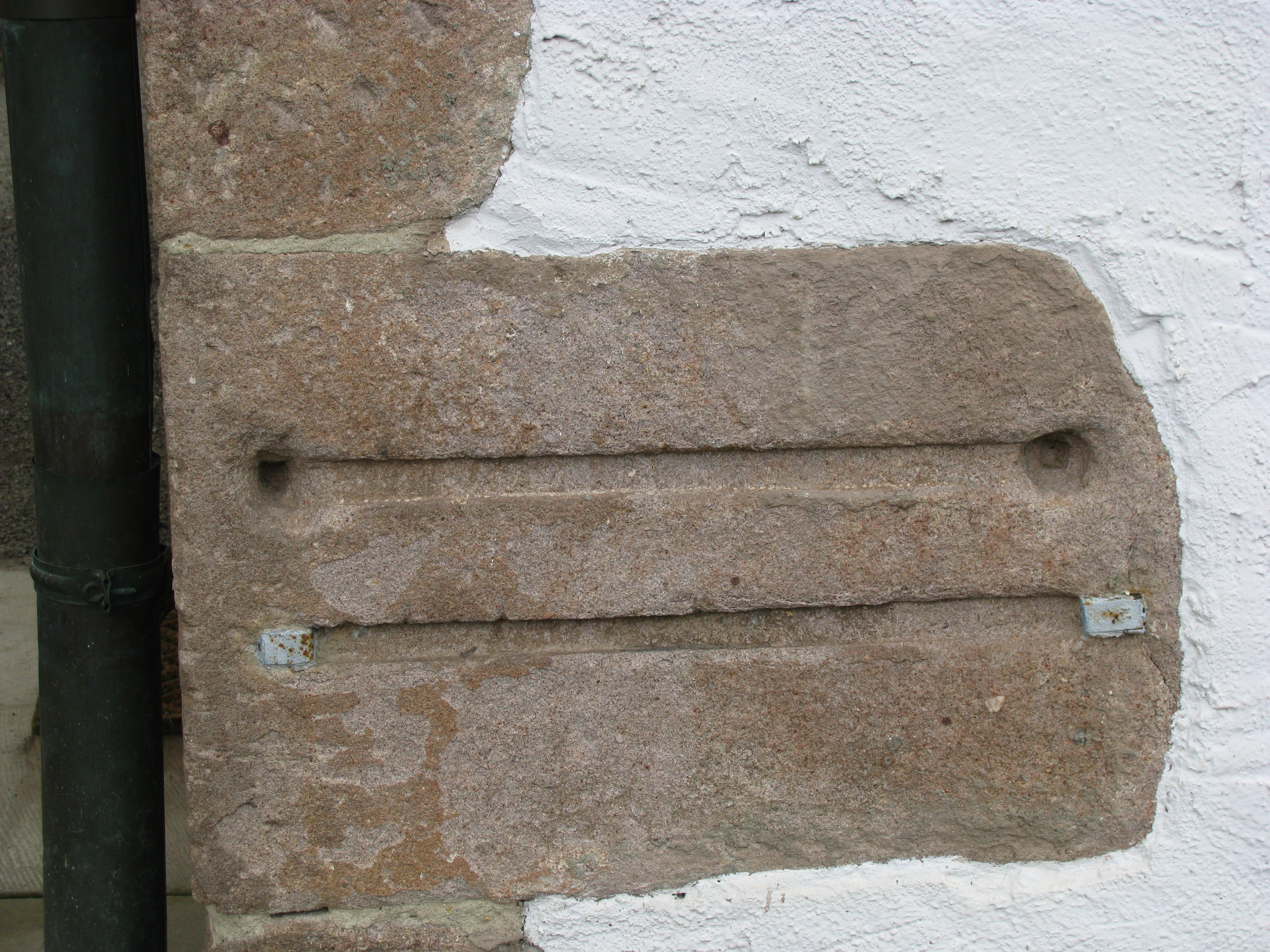
Units of length: Electoral Palatine and Brabantine ells, Hirsau Church

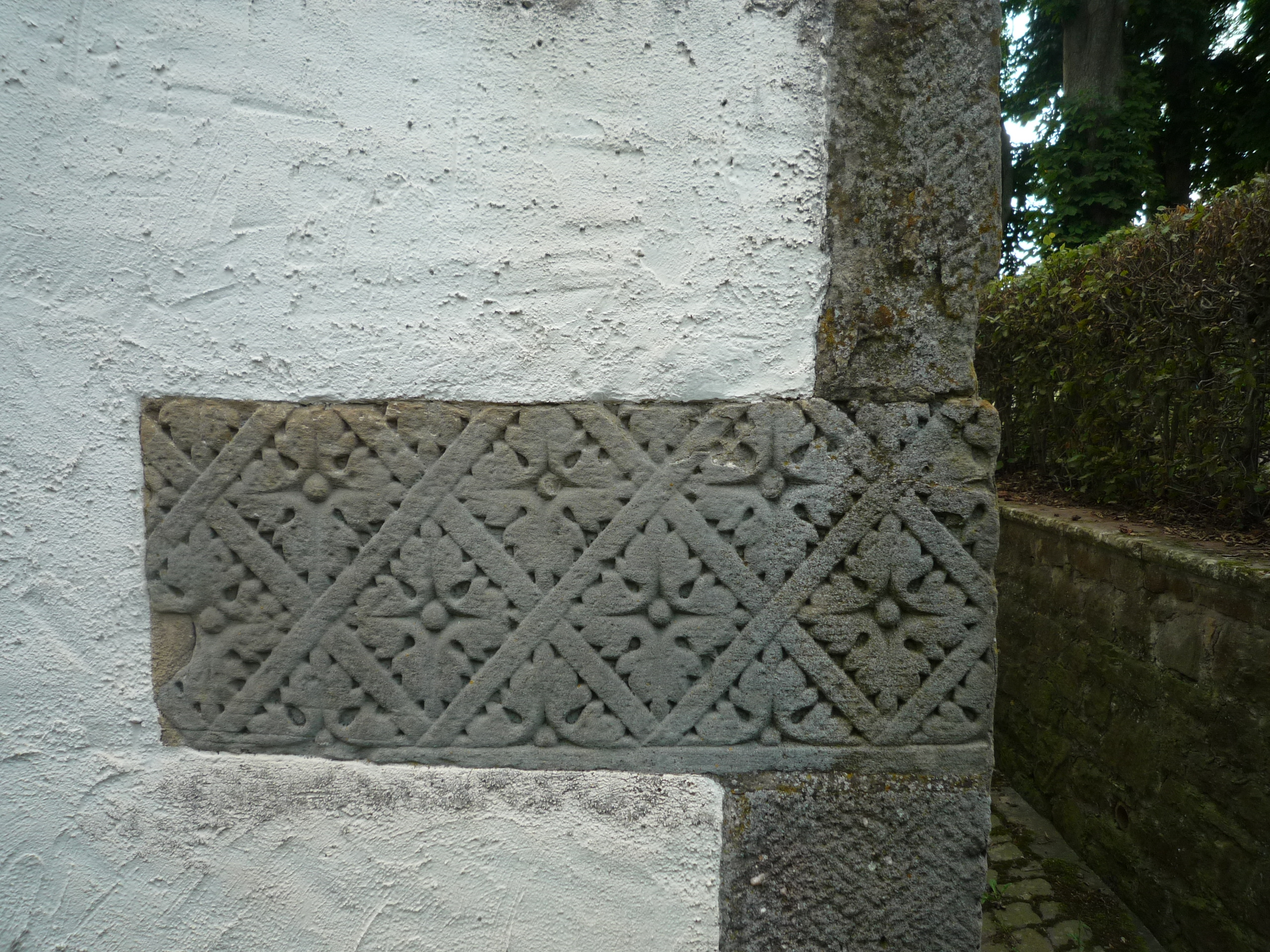
Quader mit Zierschlägen an der SW-Ecke

The Hirsau Church (German: Hirsauer Kirche or Hirsau Chapel (Hirsauer Kapelle) is an old church near Offenbach-Hundheim in the German state of Rhineland-Palatinate. It lies about 500 metres downstream of Hundheim on the River Glan, was built in the early 12th century and was consecrated by St. Alban. Hirsau Church was first recorded in 1289, but elements of the building indicate that it dates to the early 12th century. There was probably a church here as early as the 7th century.

In an inscription at the base of the tower, which is supposed to have been still visible in the 1840s, the year of construction was give as 1106. The oldest part of the church, the nave, dates to this period, as manufacturing marks on several of the stones in the wall show. In the outer walls, Roman spolia were used. On the west side the ashlars have decorative marks. The windows on the south side date to the 16th century. They were added in 1507 along with the west portal.

Also in 1507 a side aisle was added on the north side of the nave. It was demolished after the Thirty Years' War and rebuilt only after renovations in 1894. Access from the nave is via four ogival arcades resting on simple round columns. Today, a medieval sarcophagus and several Roman spolia are kept in the side aisle.

In the first half of the 13th century, the originally smaller chancel was converted into the present chancel tower. Around 1260, a cross-ribbed vault and large tracery window were added. The entrance from the nave forms a round Romanesque arch.

The paintings in the chancel date from the 13th century and were uncovered in 1963/64. The painting on the ceiling is divided into four parts by the ribbed vault. In the eastern section, Christ is depicted in a mandorla, the western section shows the Coronation of Mary. In the other two sections, the apostles are depicted. On the west wall is the Last Judgement, on the east wall the sacrificial scene of Cain and Abel. The north and south walls depict scenes from the life of Mary and the Passion of Christ. The murals had already been whitewashed over by the 14th century.

On the south side of the nave, according to an inscription on the pedestal, the sacristy was built in 1615. On a corner ashlar in the outer wall 2 measures of length have been carved: an Electoral Palatine (53 cm) and a Brabantine (56.5 cm) ell.

The belfry was renovated in the 17th century. It still houses two Gothic bells: The older one was cast in 1480 by Johannes Otto of Kaiserslautern, the more recent one around 1500.

Around the church is the cemetery, whose wall and ogival gate date from the 15th century.

In the Middle Ages, Hirsau Church was the parish church for the parishes of the Eßweiler Tal (Essweiler valley), to which the villages Eßweiler, Oberweiler im Tal, Hinzweiler, Nerzweiler, Hundheim, Aschbach, Horschbach, Elzweiler and Hachenbach belonged. Today Hirsau Church is a Protestant parish church and belongs to the Hinzweiler parish.

== Literature ==
- Christian Schüler-Beigang (reviser): Kreis Kusel (= Kulturdenkmäler in Rheinland-Pfalz. Denkmaltopographie Bundesrepublik Deutschland. Vol. 16). Wernersche Verlagsgesellschaft, Worms, 1999, ISBN 3-88462-163-7.
