= Oberweiler im Tal =

- Municipality
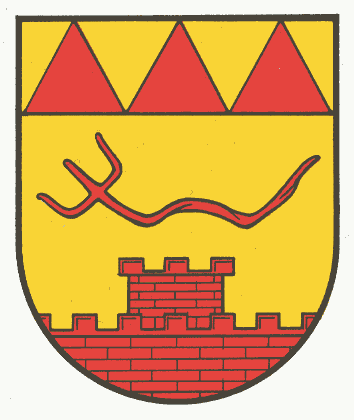
- Coat of arms

- Location of Oberweiler im Tal within Kusel district
- Interactive map of Oberweiler im Tal
- Location within Germany Location within Rhineland-Palatinate
- Coordinates: 49°34′50.43″N 7°32′59.22″E
- Country: Germany
- State: Rhineland-Palatinate
- District: Kusel
- Municipal assoc.: Lauterecken-Wolfstein

Government
  - Mayor (2019–24): Harry Kelemen

Area
  - Total: 4.71 km^{2} (1.82 sq mi)
- Elevation: 220 m (720 ft)

Population (2025-12-31)
  - Total: 160
  - Density: 34/km^{2} (88/sq mi)
- Time zone: UTC+01:00 (CET)
  - Summer (DST): UTC+02:00 (CEST)
- Postal codes: 67756
- Dialling codes: 06304
- Vehicle registration: KUS

Oberweiler im Tal is an Ortsgemeinde – a municipality belonging to a Verbandsgemeinde, a kind of collective municipality – in the Kusel district in Rhineland-Palatinate, Germany. It belongs to the Verbandsgemeinde Lauterecken-Wolfstein.

In the south at the municipal limit with Eßweiler stands a ruined castle, the Sprengelburg, which was built about 1300.

== Geography ==
=== Location ===
Oberweiler im Tal, in the North Palatine Uplands, lies in the Eßweiler Tal (dale) at an elevation of some 205 m above sea level against the backdrop of the Königsberg to the east, up from a narrowing in the dale where the water from the Jettenbach flows down a steep slope onto the flatter land on the floor of the dale. Within Oberweiler's limits, the 568-metre Königsberg's outliers reach heights of more than 500 m above sea level. The hills on the dale's left bank, which rise up towards the Herrmannsberg, a 536-metre-high hill to the west, reach heights of some 350 m above sea level within Oberweiler's limits. The municipal area measures 461 ha, of which 108 ha is wooded and roughly 10 ha is settled.

=== Neighbouring municipalities ===
Oberweiler im Tal borders in the north on the municipality of Hinzweiler, in the east on the municipality of Aschbach, in the south on the municipality of Eßweiler and in the west on the municipality of Horschbach.

=== Municipality's layout ===
Oberweiler im Tal lies in the Eßweiler Tal on Landesstraße 372, which runs north–south along the brook's left bank here. Oberweiler is a linear village (by some definitions, a "thorpe") with a few sidestreets branching of the main street up into small side dales, and with rather loosely spread building, although the built-up area towards the north end is a bit more tightly packed. Here, during the 19th century, a small residential area grew up over on the brook's right bank. All together, there was little or no expansion of the village's built-up area in the 20th century. Former farmhouses often still bear the features of an Einfirsthaus ("house with a single roof ridge"), also known as a Quereinhaus (a combination residential and commercial house divided for these two purposes down the middle, perpendicularly to the street). The graveyard lies in the village's north on the left side of the road. To the south, west of the road at the brook's steep bank and partly within Eßweiler's limits, stand the ruins of the Sprengelburg (also called the Springeburg), a castle that was once the seat of the Lords of Mühlenstein, vassals to the Rhinegraves of Grumbach.

== History ==
=== Antiquity ===
Going by the many prehistoric archaeological finds in the broader area around Oberweiler im Tal, it may be assumed that the area right near the village was inhabited as far back as the Bronze Age and the Iron Age, and perhaps even as early as the New Stone Age. Currently, nothing is known about definite finds within Oberweiler's limits. In Roman times, too, the area was settled. In Johannes Hofmann's 1595 description of the Eßweiler Tal, it says: "In the Oberweiler municipal area, on the right side against the Königsberg, called auf der Huben, years ago copper coins were found, and a field there lies full of pieces of burnt or hewn stone, that may well be supposed to have been a great building that stood there." It cannot be ruled out that a Gallo-Roman times villa rustica once stood there.

=== Middle Ages ===
In 1290, Oberweiler im Tal had its first documentary mention. Oberweiler to a great extent shares its mediaeval history with all the villages in the Eßweiler Tal, which in many respects form a unit. Besides Oberweiler itself, these were originally Hundheim (Neuenglan), Hachenbach, Nerzweiler, Aschbach, Horschbach, Hinzweiler, Elzweiler, Eßweiler and the now vanished villages of Letzweiler, Niederaschbach, Nörweiler, Mittelhofen, Zeizelbach, Füllhof, Neideck and Lanzweiler. It is certain that these villages lay within the free Imperial domain around the royal castle at Lautern (Kaiserslautern). In the 9th century, likely shortly before 870, the nobleman Hererich was enfeoffed with the Eßweiler Tal and shortly before his death he bequeathed it to Prüm Abbey. This area's ecclesiastical hub was at first Hirsau Church, an old country church, now no longer used, that still stands near Hundheim. Hundheim at this time, still bore the name Glena or Glan, and was perhaps "Neuenglan" (Nieuwen Glena) as opposed to the place still called "Altenglan" (Gleni). This Glena was Hun's seat, Hun being an administrator of sorts who oversaw the whole dale for the actual lords. His name gave the seat lying at the mouth of the Talbach ("Dale Brook"), where it empties into the Glan, its name, Hundheim (the first syllable's resemblance to the Modern High German word for "dog" might be folk etymology; Heim is still German for "home" today). Sometime before 1222, Prüm Abbey lost its holdings in the Glan valley, the circumstances under which this happened now being unknown. What is known, however, is that after that year, it was never again mentioned in Prüm Abbey's documents. The highest feudal lord now became the Electors of the Palatinate who at first enfeoffed the Waldgraviate-Rhinegraviate with the high court jurisdiction, and all together 14 feudal lords with rights in the Eßweiler Tal who exercised special rights in the Eßweiler Tal and could rightfully take a share of the tithes, namely the Junker Mühlenstein von Grumbach as the Rhinegraves' vassal, the County Palatine of Zweibrücken, Offenbach Abbey, Remigiusberg Abbey, Tholey Abbey, Enkenbach Abbey, the Knights Hospitaller commandry at Sulzbach, the Church of Zweibrücken, the Church of Sankt Julian, the Church of Hinzweiler, the Stangenjunker of Lauterecken, the House of Blick von Lichtenberg, the Lords of Mauchenheim and the Lords of Mickelheim. Obviously, each fiefholder held a different administrative seat. The Waldgraves and Rhinegraves, as holders of high jurisdiction, resided above the Lords of Mühlenstein (later Cratz von Scharfenstein) who resided near Hirsau Church (Hirsauer Kirche) and at the Springeburg (or Sprengelburg; the ruin still stands today between Eßweiler and Oberweiler im Tal). The name is commonly taken to mean the seat over a Sprengel, a word meaning "parish". Johannes Hofmann used the name form Springeburg for the castle. Hermann and Johann von Mühlensteiner are named in a series of Veldenz documents between 1377 and 1439. It seems likely that the Mühlensteiners lived as robber barons in the 15th century, for according to one of Johannes Hofmann's reports, their trade-hindering activities got them into a feud with the city of Strasbourg. "The oft-named Mühlsteiner Junkers," reads one account, "have become foes of the city of Strasbourg ... who in a hostile way have struck over the countryside and in the towns, robbed them violently, brought them great damage and markedly hindered them in their mercantile activities and other dealings, as they have now done the city of Strasbourg great disruption and harm." According to one of Hofmann's later reports, the citizens of Strasbourg through cunning managed to thrust their way into the castle and destroy it, supposedly sometime before 1415. The Sprengelburg might thus by the early 15th century have been a ruin. In 1977 and 1978, however, under American historian Thomas E. Higel's leadership, the ruin was unearthed and surveyed. Professor Higel, from the University of Maryland, and his team stumbled on a young woman's skeleton; she might have died in the castle's destruction. They also found jewellery. Yet another of Hofmann's reports stated that the last Mühlensteiner's still young widow wed a Lord Cratz von Scharfenstein. This lordly house exercised in the centuries that followed much the same function as the Lords of Mühlenstein, choosing as their seat, however, the so-called Oberhof ("Upper Estate") near the Hirsauer Kirche. The Counts of Veldenz, as feudal lords over the dale's "poor people" (as of 1444, this was instead the Counts Palatine of Zweibrücken) chose as their seat the village of Nerzweiler, which between 1350 and 1451 was always named in documents as the seat of the Nerzweiler Amt. Count Friedrich III of Veldenz granted his wife Margarethe of Nassau-Saarbrücken this Amt as a widow's estate. After 1451, Hundheim once again appeared as the only administrative seat. Hinzweiler itself got its own church in 1451, and became the parish's hub in the Eßweiler Tal instead of the Hirsauer Kirche. Dependence on a great number of lords in the dale afforded greater freedom than in other areas where united power and governing relationships prevailed. Legal matters within the Eßweiler Tal were governed by a whole range of Weistümer (singular: Weistum – cognate with English wisdom – this was a legal pronouncement issued by men learned in law in the Middle Ages and early modern times), which were already in force in the Middle Ages, although they were not actually set down in writing until the early 16th century. These documents are still preserved, and are said today to be prime examples of mediaeval jurisprudence. One deals with the court and borders, one is a Kanzelweistum (promulgated at church; Kanzel is German for "pulpit"), one is a Huberweistum (Huber were farmers who worked a whole Hube, which roughly corresponds to an "oxgang"), and one was a municipal Weistum (Gemeindeweistum). In 1481, Oberweiler was mentioned in connection with a dispute that Duke Ludwig I pursued with Count Johannes vom Stein. Ludwig had waged several wars against Elector Palatine Friedrich, bringing hardship and woe even to lands not then in Palatinate-Zweibrücken's immediate ownership, like the Eßweiler Tal. It goes without saying that both Oberweiler and Sankt Julian were destroyed in this dispute. The Count vom Stein demanded damages. In the proceedings, both parties affirmed, however, that Ludwig was not to pay any damages in money, but rather was to hand over Schloss Bundenbach (a palatial residence) and Hahnweiler to the Count vom Stein as fiefs.

=== Modern times ===
As early as 1526, the Reformation was introduced into the Eßweiler Tal. In the course of the 16th century, the Plague raged in the Eßweiler Tal, depopulating the villages. In Oberweiler im Tal itself, only 15 people were left by 1575. With regard to the ruling class, this brought about a shift in power in 1595 as the high jurisdiction, hitherto held for some 250 years by the Waldgraves and Rhinegraves, was transferred to the Dukes of Zweibrücken. In return, Count Palatine Johannes I of Zweibrücken transferred the village of Kirchenbollenbach near Idar-Oberstein (nowadays a Stadtteil of that town) to the Rhinegraves. Lordship over the blood court thereby ended up in new hands (which already held the lower jurisdiction), while the other lords named still otherwise held their tithing rights in the various villages. In 1614, Duke Johannes II of Zweibrücken traded his serfs in Teschenmoschel for some in the Eßweiler Tal belonging to Baron Johann Gottfried von Sickingen in Schallodenbach. Oberweiler also suffered in the Thirty Years' War. Details are, however, unavailable. Another fundamental shift in the power structure came in 1755, when Duke Christian IV transferred to Offenbach Abbey the villages of Hundheim, Nerzweiler, Hinzweiler, Oberweiler im Tal, Oberaschbach and Niederaschbach (now vanished) and also the Hirsauer Kirche to the Rhinegraves of Grumbach, who until 1595 had exercised high jurisdiction in these villages. Oberweiler thereafter remained in the Rhinegraviate until the collapse of the old feudal order in the course of the French Revolution. Between 1700 and 1789, mercury was mined within Oberweiler's limits.

==== Recent times ====
During the time of the French Revolution and the Napoleonic era that followed, the German lands on the Rhine's left bank were annexed by France beginning in 1797. The French thereby swept away all borders that had hitherto existed and established their own administrative entities. Roughly, the Glan formed the boundary between the Departments of Sarre and Mont-Tonnerre (or Donnersberg in German). Oberweiler im Tal passed to the newly founded Mairie ("Mayoralty") of Eßweiler, which itself belonged to the Canton of Wolfstein, the Arrondissement of Kaiserslautern and the Department of Mont-Tonnerre. After the victory over Napoleon, the Congress of Vienna awarded a territory on the Rhine to the Kingdom of Bavaria, the Baierischer Rheinkreis ("Bavarian Rhine District"), later known as the Bayerische Rheinpfalz ("Bavarian Rhenish Palatinate"). In 1816, after a transitional period, Oberweiler belonged within this territory to the Canton of Wolfstein and the Landkommissariat (later Bezirksamt, and later still Landkreis or District) of Kusel. After the First World War, the Kingdom of Bavaria became the Free State of Bavaria. In the late 1920s and early 1930s, the Nazi Party (NSDAP) became quite popular in Oberweiler im Tal. In the 1928 Reichstag elections, 2.4% of the local votes went to Adolf Hitler's party, and by the 1930 Reichstag elections, this had grown only slightly to 2.7%. By the time of the 1933 Reichstag elections, though, after Hitler had already seized power, local support for the Nazis had swollen to 87.5%. Hitler's success in these elections paved the way for his Enabling Act of 1933 (Ermächtigungsgesetz), thus starting the Third Reich in earnest. Since 1946, Oberweiler has been part of the then newly founded state of Rhineland-Palatinate. In the course of the 1968 administrative restructuring in Rhineland-Palatinate, the Ortsgemeinde of Oberweiler im Tal was grouped into the Verbandsgemeinde of Wolfstein – formed on 1 January 1972, the same day that the Bürgermeisterei ("Mayoralty") of Eßweiler, which had been responsible for Oberweiler, was dissolved – in the Kusel district.

=== Population development ===
Oberweiler im Tal was throughout the Middle Ages a small village whose very existence was threatened in times of war and Plague. After the Plague of 1564, Oberweiler had only seven inhabitants left. In 1595, the following families crop up in Oberweiler: Hanstall, Rheinheimer, Weißgerber, Weber, Vinzensen, Preuel and Laufersweiler. In 1609, the count was back up to 145 inhabitants in 34 households. The people earned their livelihoods mainly by working the land. As was generally true of such villages, there were also craftsmen to be found alongside the farmers, such as blacksmiths, shoemakers, wainwrights, tailors and millers. Furthermore, several families worked at weaving. Some men went to the ore mines, quarries, collieries and limestone pits in the surrounding area to earn income. Within Oberweiler's own limits was a quicksilver mine. In the 19th century, Wandermusikanten – travelling musicians – arose in Oberweiler as they also did elsewhere in the dale, plying their trade throughout the world (see the Hinzweiler article for more about this). Founded in Oberweiler was a piano-building firm named Eichler, although this later moved its workshops to Hinzweiler. According to 1743 statistics, there were only free men heading families, and no Hintersassen (roughly, "dependent peasants"), whereas in 1590, four serfs had been named. Among craftsmen, who only farmed as a secondary occupation, four linen weavers were counted, along with one stocking weaver, three wainwrights, three tailors, two bricklayers, one blacksmith, one shoemaker, one cooper, one carpenter, one cabinetmaker and the miller. Fundamentally, this occupational structure remained in place well into the 20th century. Nevertheless, these traditional crafts have since disappeared. Now, most villagers must seek work outside the village. As to ecclesiastical structure in days of yore, there was a time when most villagers belonged to the Reformed faith as taught by John Calvin. Of the 34 families (164 inhabitants) living in Oberweiler in 1743, 29 were said to be Reformed, while 4 were Catholic and 1 was Lutheran. In the late 18th century, Jews also moved into the village. Statistics from 1825 show that among the 312 inhabitants, 257 were Protestant (the Lutheran and Reformed Churches had by now united), 37 were Catholic and 18 were Jewish. In 1962, the village had 240 inhabitants, of whom 219 were Protestant and 40 Catholic. For a few decades, a rather sharp drop in population figures has been noticed. Along with this has come a rise in the villagers' average age.

The following table shows population development over the centuries for Oberweiler im Tal, with some figures broken down by religious denomination:

Year	1609	1743	1825	1835	1871	1905	1939	1961	1986	2005
Total	145	164	312	351	348	312	248	240	187	203
Catholic			37					20
Evangelical			257					219
Jewish			18					–

=== Municipality's name ===
The village's name, Oberweiler, has the common German placename ending —weiler, which as a standalone word means "hamlet" (originally "homestead"). With the one exception of Hundheim, every village in the Eßweiler Tal bears this same name ending, which makes it rather difficult to determine their founding dates with any certainty. To this ending is prefixed the element Ober—, meaning "upper", which relates to the village's location, which is higher up than where Hinzweiler lies. Thus, the name means "Upper Homestead". Oberweiler's first documentary mention names the village as Oberwiller. The spelling used today first cropped up in the historical record as early as 1588. The tag "im Tal", German for "in the dale" was added in the earlier half of the 19th century to distinguish the village from the other place in the same district with the same name.

=== Vanished villages ===
A village called Huntwilre, which is named in a document from the latter half of the 14th century, might have lain within what are now Oberweiler im Tal's limits. According to researchers Dolch and Greule, this village's name may have been applied for a time to another, now also vanished, village in the Eßweiler Tal. It is highly likely that, as in Hundheim's case, Huntwilre was the seat of a Hun, or an Untervogt, who exercised some lordly function throughout the dale. It is not only likely but quite certain that there was a place within what are now Oberweiler's limits called Neidecken. Johannes Hofmann wrote about this place in 1595: "Between the two grounds of Kraulsbach and Zörnberg on the other side of the Hermannsberg lies a great estate on which the old Mühlensteiner Junkers of Springenburg had a farm and a depository, named Neydeks. The old walls where this estate stood one can still see there in the hedges." Clearly, the Knights of Mülenstein (a variant of the noble house's name) who had owned the estate of Neideck (also a variant) had by then forsaken it; it was no longer being worked and had fallen into disrepair. The estate's name also appears in a document from about 1400 in the Veldenz cartularies. In this, its first documentary mention, the name was rendered hof zu Nydeckin ("estate at Nydeckin"). Neidecken's location is also described as lying on the Bornberg between Graulsdell and Zährenberg. On an 1843 map, Neideck was marked as Kratzerhof (perhaps after the Counts Kratz von Scharfenstein, successors to the Mülensteins' lordship over the Eßweiler Tal), north of which lay a field named Hofstatt. The estate might have been fortified rather like a castle

== Religion ==
The old Hirsauer Kirche was originally the spiritual hub for all villages in the Eßweiler Tal. When it was that a church was first built in Hirsau (not to be confused with Hirsau in Baden-Württemberg) cannot be determined today. It can be assumed nonetheless that there had been an earlier church standing at the same spot centuries before the one that still stands now was built (about 1100); it may have been wooden. Churchgoers came from throughout the dale to attend services, all weddings were held there, and so were all funerals and burials. It was also the thingstead, and on certain days, market was held there, too. Hirsau lost this central role when in 1451 the church in Hinzweiler was built, although originally this only functioned as a chapel of ease to Hirsau's parish church. This actually brought about competition between the two churches in the time that followed for the function of parish church. As early as 1526, the Duchy of Palatinate-Zweibrücken introduced the Reformation into the church of the Oberamt of Meisenheim, replacing Catholic belief with Martin Luther's teachings so that bit by bit, church services in the Eßweiler Tal, too, began to be conducted in accordance with the Reformation. The Offenbach Monastery, to which the Hinzweiler church was subject, at first opposed Reformist efforts. In 1555, though, the Rhinegraves of Grumbach, too, introduced the Reformation, and in 1588, the Offenbach Monastery was dissolved. After the Counts Palatine of Zweibrücken had become absolute fiefholders over the Eßweiler Tal in 1595, worshippers then had to convert to Calvinism in line with developments in the County Palatine. Likewise in the late 16th century, Count Palatine Johannes I of Zweibrücken decreed that all his subjects were to convert to the Reformed faith according to John Calvin. Beginning in 1601, Hinzweiler became the temporary parish seat, but already by 1610, it once again had to yield this function to Hirsau, only to get it back after the Thirty Years' War. This structure remains in place to this day. In earlier days, Oberweiler's inhabitants were mainly Reformed, according to John Calvin's teachings. As minorities, there were Lutherans, who in 1824 merged with the Calvinists, and Jews came to settle in the late 18th century, as they also did in the neighbouring villages of Eßweiler and Hinzweiler.

== Politics ==
=== Municipal council ===
The council is made up of 6 council members, who were elected by majority vote at the municipal election held on 7 June 2009, and the honorary mayor as chairman.

=== Mayor ===
Oberweiler im Tal's mayor is Harry Kelemen.

=== Coat of arms ===
The German blazon reads: Unter gold-rotem Zickzackschildhaupt in Gold, über einer roten Zinnenburg mit rotem Zinnenturm im Schildfuß, eine rote Geißel. Another source yields this form: Unter goldrotem Zickzackschildhaupt in Gold, über einer wachsenden roten Zinnenburg mit rotem Zinnenturm eine rote Geißel.

The municipality's arms might in English heraldic language be described thus: Below a chief indented of three Or and gules Or issuant from base a castle embattled with a tower likewise, above which a scourge, all of the second.

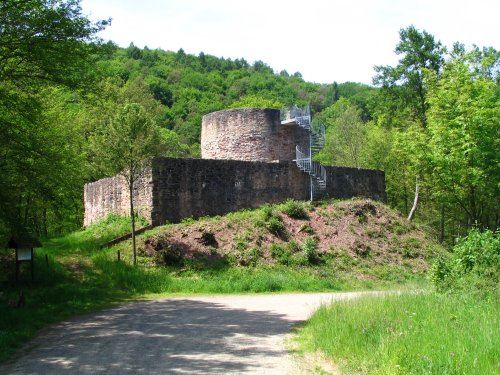
The Sprengelburg (monumental zone)

This heraldic composition is drawn from old court seals. The charge in base is meant to be the Sprengelburg, a now ruined castle that was built about 1300 and once held sway throughout the Eßweiler Tal. The arms have been borne since 1983 when they were approved by the now defunct Rheinhessen-Pfalz Regierungsbezirk administration in Neustadt an der Weinstraße.

== Culture and sightseeing ==
=== Buildings ===
The following are listed buildings or sites in Rhineland-Palatinate's Directory of Cultural Monuments:

- Sprengelburg (monumental zone) – 13th and 14th centuries, destroyed in the im 14th century, 1978/1979 modern reconstruction on old foundations, defensive wall on square footprint, round tower
- At Hauptstraße 12 – elaborately shaped portal with skylight, about 1800
- Hauptstraße 17 – former school; plastered building, Rundbogenstil, about 1860, architect possibly Johann Schmeisser, Kusel, conversion in 1934; characterizes street's appearance

=== Regular events ===
Oberweiler im Tal holds its kermis (church consecration festival) on the third weekend in September.

=== Clubs ===
Oberweiler im Tal has a singing club, a countrywomen's club, a fire brigade promotional association and a nursing association.

== Economy and infrastructure ==
=== Economic structure ===
In the past, agriculture was the main livelihood in Oberweiler im Tal, although working alongside farmers were many kinds of craftsmen, particularly linen weavers. Even as far back as the 19th century, the mine directories kept by the Kingdom of Bavaria, to which Oberweiler belonged after the Congress of Vienna, listed three limestone galleries within Oberweiler's limits. The mill in its heyday had an overshot waterwheel and one run, for gristmilling, and this could then only be used when the mills farther upstream, at Eßweiler, saw fit to release enough water. Today, farming is still an important part of the economy, but most villagers in the workforce must seek work elsewhere, commuting to jobs outside the village. Nevertheless, there are a few businesses in the village itself, such as a bus and taxi company, a shop catering to those whose interests lie in shooting sports, a butcher's shop, two manicure-pedicure salons and one inn.

=== Education ===
Schooling experienced a general upswing beginning in the time of the Reformation, but no later than the Thirty Years' War (1618-1648), it had fallen by the wayside. About the beginnings of organized education in Oberweiler im Tal itself, very little is known. It may be assumed, though, that schoolchildren from Oberweiler originally attended classes in nearby Hinzweiler. When no teacher was available to teach lessons in Hinzweiler in the late 16th century, the pastor had to take over the teaching duties. It is likely that a candidate for a pastoral post was hired as a teacher. Records from 1762 show that Hinzweiler had not only a Reformed (Calvinist) school but also a Lutheran "main school", that is to say, a school with year-round classes, supported by villages in the area that had Lutheran winter schools (schools geared towards an agricultural community's practical needs, held in the winter, when farm families had a bit more time to spare) with payments in money and kind. Back then, villages seldom had their own schoolhouses, and lessons were taught at private houses, or sometimes on premises owned by the municipality. The village's first schoolhouse was built in 1860, and another one in 1905. Today, Hauptschule students attend school at the Hauptschule in Wolfstein, while the primary school pupils must go to the school in Rothselberg.

=== Transport ===
Running through Oberweiler im Tal is Landesstraße 372, which links Rothselberg with Offenbach-Hundheim and also links Oberweiler to nearby Hinzweiler. To the east runs Bundesstraße 270. The nearest Autobahn interchanges are the ones at Kusel, 18 km away, and Kaiserslautern, 25 km away. At the Reckweilerhof, an outlying centre of Wolfstein, is the nearest railway station, which lies on the Lautertalbahn.
