= Sprengelburg =

- Springeburg
- Eßweiler and Oberweiler im Tal
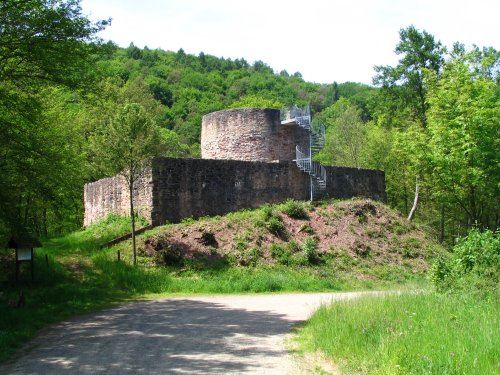
- The Sprengelburg

Site information
- Type: hill castle
- Code: DE-RP
- Condition: ruin

Location
- Coordinates: 49°33′58″N 07°33′28″E

Site history
- Built: c. 1200 to 1300

Garrison information
- Occupants: ministeriales

The Sprengelburg (or Springeburg) is a ruined hill castle in the county of Kusel in Rhineland-Palatinate. It lies between the villages of Eßweiler and Oberweiler im Tal on the L 372 state road. In 1983 the ruins were declared a heritage monument.

== Location ==
The Sprengelburg lies on an outlier of the Königsberg between Eßweiler and Oberweiler im Tal immediately next to the Landesstraße 372. The boundary of the two municipalities runs through the castle terrain.

== History ==
=== Middle Ages ===
Base on what is left of the castle, the Sprengelburg may have been built in the 13th century. The castle was erected at the narrowest point of the Talbach valley and guarded the road that used to run below it in the valley bottom.

The castle lords (Burgherren) were the knights of Mülenstein, vassals (Lehnsmänner) of the Rheingrafen family in Grumbach. Whether they had the castle built is unclear. The Mülenstein family is recorded from 1317 to 1451. The Lords of Mülenstein were robber knights and inflicted serious losses on the merchants using the road. Consequently, the castle was destroyed by Strasbourg merchants in retaliation for the raids. The exact date of its destruction is not known. Lichtenberg state scribe (Landschreiber) and surveyor, Johannes Hoffmann, wrote in his "Description of the Essweiler Valley in 1595", however, that the castle estate was cleared and cultivated several times by local farmers after its destruction, but the harvests had always failed because of wet and cold summers. When after a third clearing "a great darkness had come in the middle of the day in summer" and this harvest also failed, they finally gave up and the castle terrain became overgrown over in the following years. This eclipse after the third clearing could have been the solar eclipse of 1441.

=== Modern period ===
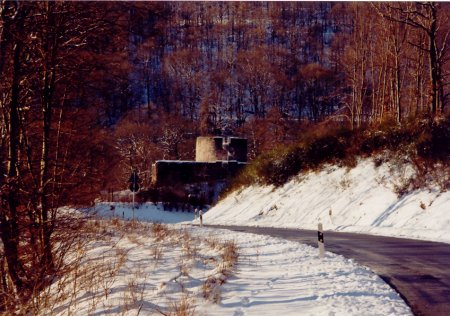
The Sprengelburg

After the unsuccessful attempts to cultivate the castle terrain, it became completely overgrown. Until the 1970s, no building remains could be found, the castle was slumbering under a hill covered with trees. Only the name am alten Schloss and the remains of the neck ditch, which was partly built over by the L372, hinted at what was hidden underneath.

From 1976 onwards, excavations were carried out on the site by students of the University of Maryland under the direction of Professor Higel. The remains of the outer walls, a rectangle measuring 20 by 15 metres, and a round tower, 8 metres in diameter, were uncovered. In the summer of 1978, the skeleton of a woman was also discovered inside the castle.
After the excavations were completed, reconstruction work was carried out, initiated by the Department of Monuments in Speyer. The outer walls and the tower were rebuilt, and a round-arched gate was inserted into the outer wall at the rear of the complex as the entrance. Some of the stones found during the excavation were used for this purpose. The modern ascent to the 8.5-metre-high tower, an iron spiral staircase, was added at that time. This leads to an observation deck, although the view from the deck through the surrounding forest is quite limited.

== Stories ==
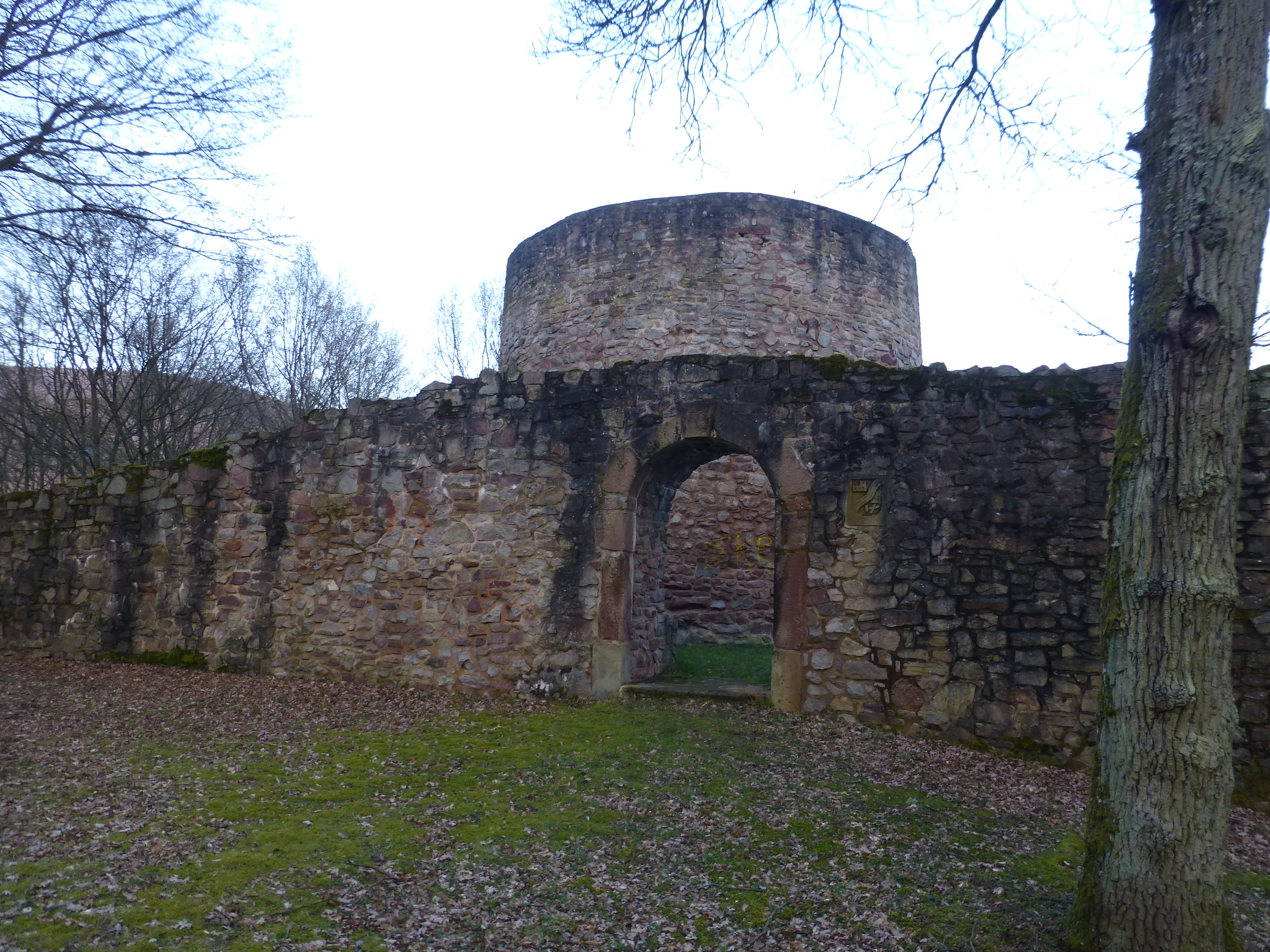
Rear view with the entrance gate of the Sprengelburg

The following stories about the castle have circulated:

=== Destruction ===
Johannes Hofmann writes the following words about the castle's destruction in his "Beschreibung des Eßweiler Thals 1595":
The Lords of Mülenstein, two brothers, were once at a wedding in Eßweiler. The Strasbourg merchants took advantage of this, disguised themselves and were mistaken by the castle garrison for the Mülensteins. The merchants captured the castle, plundered and destroyed it. Attracted by the noise, the real lords of the castle returned, saw that they could do nothing more, and fled. They were caught by the Strasbourg merchants in front of Hinzweiler. One of the brothers was stabbed to death. At this place a cross was later erected, which the name of the field An den Kreuzäcker ("By the Cross Fields") commemorates. The other Mülenstein escaped to Grumbach.

=== The hunchback dwarf ===
There is a story that if you are on the road between Oberweiler im Tal and Eßweiler in the evening or at night, you may suddenly feel a heavy load on your back that almost pushes you almost to the ground. The climb becomes more and more difficult. But once you pass the "old castle", the weight suddenly disappears. What is going on? According to the legend the hunchbacked dwarf, who lives in the old castle ruins, has hitched a lift on your back and been carried home.

=== The white lady ===
Another legendary phenomenon is the White Lady, who appears to passers-by from the tower of the castle and tries to tempt them to follow her by waving and shouting.

=== Tunnel to Wolfstein ===
It is said that there is an underground passage from the ruined castle which leads under the Königsberg to Wolfstein. It has yet to be found. However, until the 1950s, mercury and barite were actively mined in the Königsberg, so there are many tunnels in the area.
