= Simon Wolf =

American businessman and diplomat

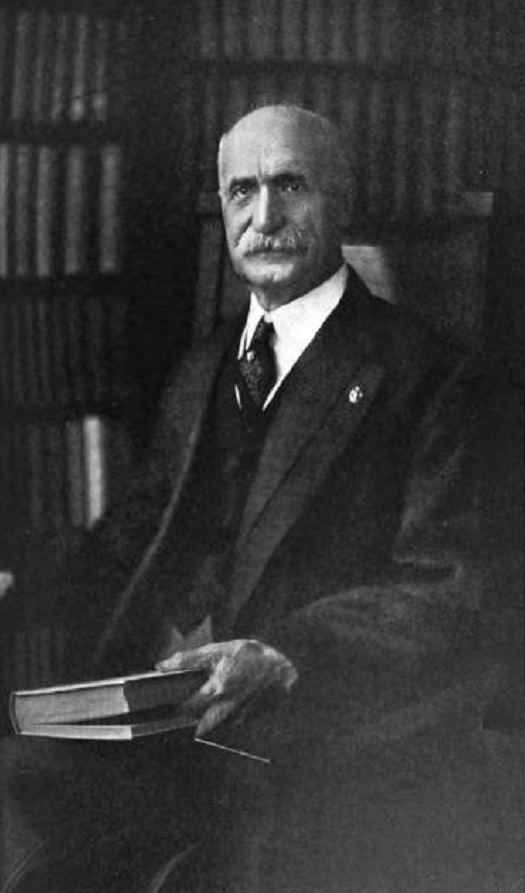
- Born: October 28, 1836; Hinzweiler, Kingdom of Bavaria.
- Died: June 4, 1923 (aged 86); Atlantic City, New Jersey, U.S.
- Occupations: Lawyer, diplomat, Jewish activist
- Spouse: Caroline Hahn
- Children: Florence Wolf Gotthold and Adolph Grant Wolf

Signature
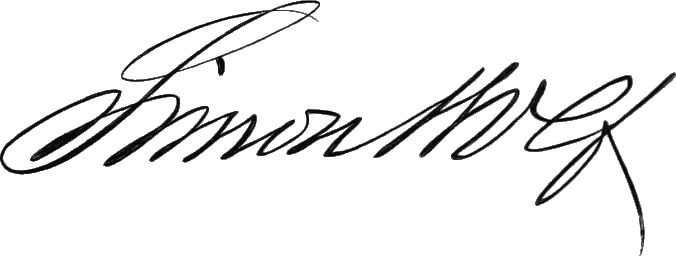

Simon Wolf (October 28, 1836 – June 4, 1923) was an American businessman, lawyer, writer, diplomat and Jewish activist.

== Biography ==
Wolf was born in Hinzweiler, Kingdom of Bavaria. He emigrated to the United States in 1848, making his home in Uhrichsville, Ohio. For several years, he followed business pursuits, but began to read law, and graduated from the Ohio Law College in Cleveland in 1861. He was admitted to the bar in Mount Vernon, Ohio, that same year. He opened a practice in New Philadelphia, Ohio, where he remained a year.

In 1862 he went to Washington, D.C., and opened a law office. In 1869, he was appointed by President Ulysses S. Grant, recorder of deeds for the District of Columbia, holding that office until May 1878. In July 1881, he received the post of consul general in Egypt, which he resigned in May 1882. He made friendships with presidents Abraham Lincoln, Ulysses S. Grant, William McKinley and Woodrow Wilson.

He was active in Jewish charitable and educational movements, and was a frequent lecturer on social, literary, and political topics. He was the founder and president of the Hebrew Orphans' Home at Atlanta, Georgia, and president of the Board of Children's Guardians, Washington. Wolf was a prominent freemason, member of Lafayette lodge, No. 19, of Washington, D.C. He was very active in the Independent Order B'nai B'rith, of which he was president from 1903 to 1905.

He died from heart disease in Atlantic City, New Jersey on June 4, 1923.

== Legacy ==
Wolf's daughter was the painter Florence Wolf Gotthold. His son Adolph Grant Wolf was associate justice of the Supreme Court of Puerto Rico.

== Works ==
- The Influence of the Jews on the Progress of the World. Washington, D.C. 1888
- The American Jew as Patriot, Soldier, and Citizen. Philadelphia, 1895.
- Mordecai Manuel Noah: A Biographical Sketch. Philadelphia, 1897.
- "Biographical Sketch of Commodore Uriah P. Levy". American Jewish Year Book, 1903
- The Presidents I Have Known from 1860-1918. Washington, D.C. 1918
