= Max Weyl =

American painter

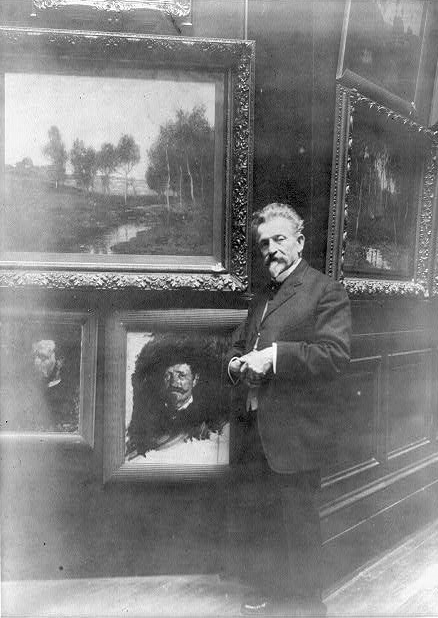
Max Weyl amid some of his paintings

Max Weyl (December 1, 1837 – 1914) was a prominent Washington, D.C. artist of the late 19th century known especially for his landscapes of Rock Creek Park and the Potomac River.

== Biography ==
He was born on December 1, 1837, in Muhlen-am-Neckar, a small town in the Grand Duchy of Baden. His parents' names were Veit Hirsch Weyl and Emma Miriam Goetz. In 1853 his family emigrated to Williamsport, Pennsylvania, where Weyl worked in watch and clock repair, a trade he had learned through an early apprenticeship. In 1857, he moved to Washington, D.C. and became a jeweler with a retail store on 7th Street NW in a building that still stands and currently is used as a Ruby Tuesday restaurant across from the Verizon Center. Weyl married Miriam Raff and had several children including Mathilda, Henry and Adolph. Weyl began to paint as a hobby and displayed some of his works in his shop window. Weyl also was active in the then-small Washington Jewish community.

In the 1870s, local businessman, Samuel H. Kauffman, publisher of the Evening Star newspaper, took noontime walks on 7th Street and observed Weyl's paintings on display in the shop window. Kauffman purchased some of Weyl's works and became his patron, financing a trip for Weyl to study art professionally in Europe.

In 1878, under Kauffman's patronage, Weyl undertook a year of study abroad, visiting studios and galleries in Munich, Paris, Vienna and Venice. After his return to Washington, he and a group of fellow artists formed the "Washington Landscape School", resulting in paintings "plein air" paintings of Washington pastoral scene.

Weyl came to be called the "American Daubigny" and his works became very popular among Washington art collectors. His work became part of collections including the White House where purchases were made by Mrs. Grover Cleveland and Mrs. Woodrow Wilson, Georgetown University, the Virginia Military Institute, Kiplinger Washington Editors, the Cosmos Club and many others.

On Weyl's 70th birthday in 1907, the Corcoran Gallery of Art held a retrospective exhibit of his work. A group of local citizens purchased and donated a work by him to the National Gallery of Art. In recognition and praise they stated: "From the standpoint of art you have contributed works of genius that will stand for all time: while your bearing as a man, citizen and friend has been of that modest and yet far-reaching character that wins the love and retains the esteem of those with whom you have come in contact."

Weyl died in 1914. His great-grandson, Christopher Wolf, has a large collection of Weyl's works and continues to live in Washington, DC as a fourth-generation Washingtonian. His grandson, the late Max Weyl II, was also a collector as well as his great-granddaughter, the late Nancy Weyl Seamon, great-grandson, Kevin Weyl and great-great-granddaughter Maraina Leigh Weyl.

Among Weyl's pupils was the painter Florence Wolf Gotthold.
