= Florence Wolf Gotthold =

American painter (1858–1930)

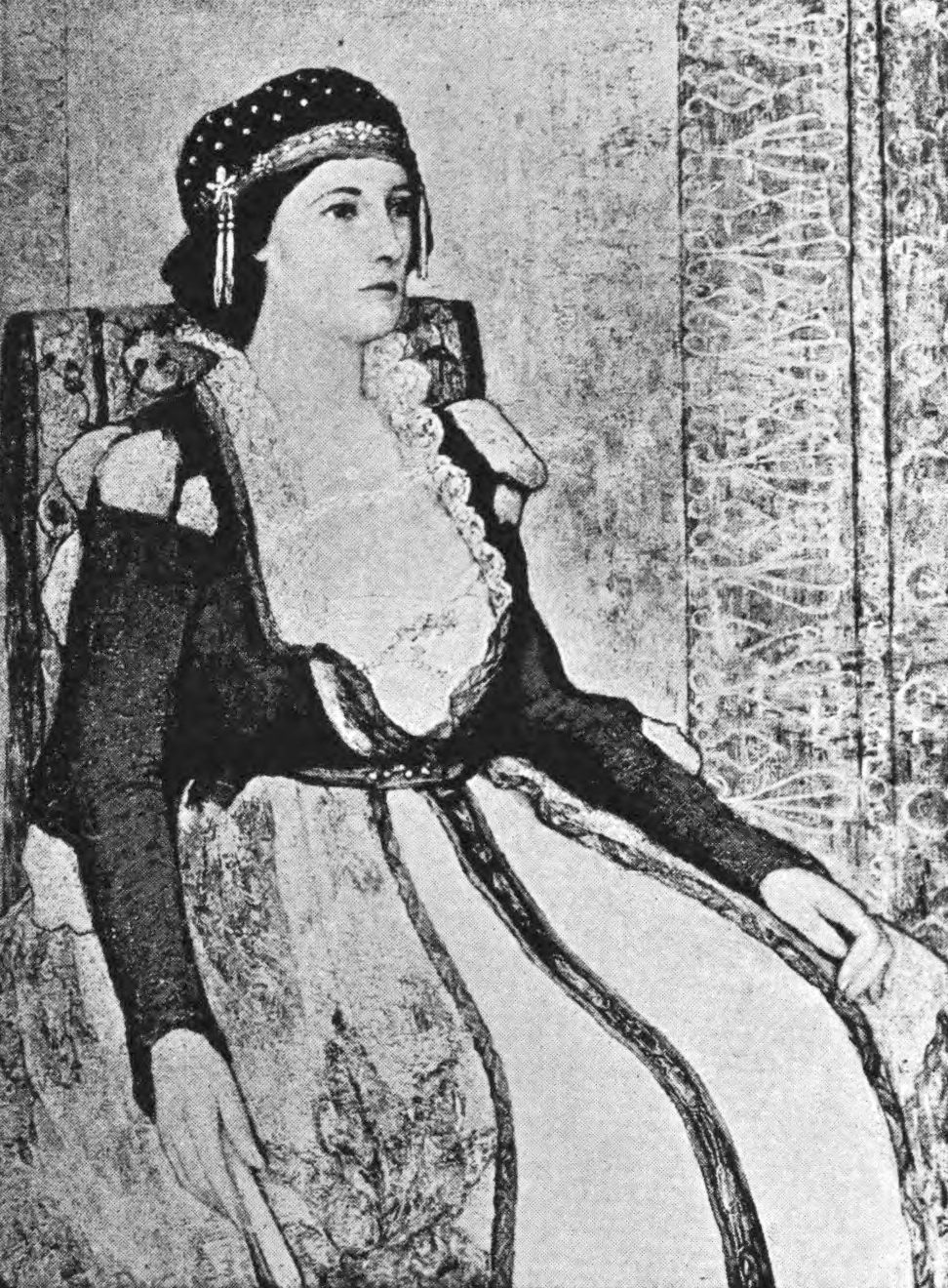
A Venetian Lady, Florence W. Gotthold (b&w reproduction)

Florence Wolf Gotthold (October 3, 1858 – August 17, 1930) was an American painter.

Born Florence Wolf in Uhrichsville, Ohio, Gotthold was the daughter of prominent attorney Simon Wolf; with her parents she moved to Washington, D.C. in 1862. Her teachers included R.R. Fritz, Harry Siddons Mowbray, Henry G. Dearth, and Max Weyl. She moved to New York City in 1898; she summered at Cos Cob, Connecticut, and exhibited work at the Yorke Galleries in Washington. She was a member of the Greenwich Society of Artists. In 1878 she married Frederick Gotthold. From the mid-1890s to the mid-1920s she showed work at the National Academy of Design, the Pennsylvania Academy of the Fine Arts, and the Art Institute of Chicago. She kept a studio in New York City until at least 1925; she died at her summer home, in Wilton, Connecticut.
