= Nerzweiler =

- Municipality
- Coat of arms

- Location of Nerzweiler within Kusel district
- Interactive map of Nerzweiler
- Location within Germany Location within Rhineland-Palatinate
- Coordinates: 49°36′16″N 7°33′14″E
- Country: Germany
- State: Rhineland-Palatinate
- District: Kusel
- Municipal assoc.: Lauterecken-Wolfstein

Government
  - Mayor (2019–24): Michael Hildebrand

Area
  - Total: 2.13 km^{2} (0.82 sq mi)
- Elevation: 180 m (590 ft)

Population (2025-12-31)
  - Total: 100
  - Density: 47/km^{2} (120/sq mi)
- Time zone: UTC+01:00 (CET)
  - Summer (DST): UTC+02:00 (CEST)
- Postal codes: 67749
- Dialling codes: 06304
- Vehicle registration: KUS
- Website: www.nerzweiler.de

Nerzweiler is an Ortsgemeinde – a municipality belonging to a Verbandsgemeinde, a kind of collective municipality – in the Kusel district in Rhineland-Palatinate, Germany. It belongs to the Verbandsgemeinde Lauterecken-Wolfstein.

== Geography ==
=== Location ===
Nerzweiler is nestled in the Eßweiler Tal (dale) in the North Palatine Uplands between Hinzweiler and Offenbach-Hundheim at an elevation of roughly 190 m above sea level. The elevations on either side of the dale reach some 300 m above sea level (Auf der Platte 310 m, Stiehlberg 280 m). The municipal area measures 213 ha, of which roughly 10 ha is settled.

=== Neighbouring municipalities ===
Nerzweiler borders in the north on the municipality of Offenbach-Hundheim, in the east on the municipality of Aschbach, in the south on the municipality of Hinzweiler and in the west on the municipality of Glanbrücken.

=== Municipality’s layout ===
Nerzweiler is a loosely settled clump village on the road running through the Eßweiler Tal (Landesstraße 372). In the village core, the village's sidestreets cross the main street, and also here, settlement is a bit heavier. The graveyard lies to the northwest, outside the village.

== History ==
=== Antiquity ===
Given the many prehistoric archaeological finds in the broader Nerzweiler area, it can be assumed that people likewise inhabited the area right around what is now Nerzweiler during the Bronze Age and the Iron Age, and perhaps even as early as the New Stone Age. There were people here during Roman times, too. In state scrivener and geometer Johannes Hofmann's 1595 description of the Eßweiler Tal, he wrote: “Likewise one also finds a walled sign near Hintzweiler and Nerzweiler in the fields down below at the Gutleuthaus (literally “good people’s house”, but actually a house for lepers) on the road. There, too, such stones, coins and quite solid pieces of limestone, like one fashioned into a table, have been found in the earth.” He was writing about finds from Roman times, such as many that were found throughout the dale. The Hachenbach chronicler, Ludwig Mahler, also speaks of Roman finds between Nerzweiler and Aschbach. He said the foundations of a Roman bath with six rooms were unearthed in 1827.

=== Middle Ages ===
To a great extent, Nerzweiler shares the same history as all the villages in the Eßweiler Tal, which in many respects, form a unit. Besides Nerzweiler itself, these villages were originally Hundheim (Neuenglan), Hachenbach, Hinzweiler, Aschbach, Horschbach, Oberweiler im Tal, Elzweiler, Eßweiler and the now vanished villages of Letzweiler, Niederaschbach, Nörweiler, Mittelhofen, Zeizelbach, Füllhof, Neideck and Lanzweiler. According to historians’ assumptions, these villages lay in the Free Imperial Domain (Reichsland) around the king's castle in Lautern (Kaiserslautern), and sometime before the 9th century, they were given over into Prüm Abbey’s ownership. This area’s ecclesiastical hub was at first the ancient church at Hirsau, the Hirsauer Kirche near Hundheim. The village of Hundheim then still bore the name Glena or Glan, perhaps even Neuenglan (Niuwen Glena), contrasting with Altenglan (Gleni) – neu and alt are German for “new” and “old” respectively. This Glena became seat of a Hund. Despite this word's modern German meaning (“dog”), this was a secular administrator for 14 feudal lords who held the right to share the tithes from the whole dale among themselves. The lords in question were the Junker Mühlenstein von Grumbach as the Rhinegraves’ vassal, the County Palatine of Zweibrücken, Offenbach Abbey, Remigiusberg Abbey, Tholey Abbey, Enkenbach Abbey, the Knights Hospitaller commandry at Sulzbach, the Church of Zweibrücken, the Church of Sankt Julian, the Church of Hinzweiler (formerly Hirsau), the Stangenjunker of Lauterecken, the House of Blick von Lichtenberg, the Lords of Mauchenheim and the Lords of Mickelheim. Obviously, each fiefholder held a different administrative seat. The Waldgraves and Rhinegraves, as holders of high jurisdiction, resided above the Lords of Mühlenstein (later Cratz von Scharfenstein) near the Hirsauer Kirche and at the Springeburg (or Sprengelburg; the ruin still stands today between Eßweiler and Oberweiler im Tal). The Counts of Veldenz, as feudal lords over the dale's “poor people” (as of 1444, this was instead the Counts Palatine of Zweibrücken) chose as their seat the village of Nerzweiler, which between 1350 and 1451 was always named in documents as the seat of the Nerzweiler Amt. Michael Frey claims in his description of the Bavarian Rhine District (bayerischer Rheinkreis) that the Counts of Veldenz had already been enfeoffed with the Amt of Nerzweiler by 1130, and thus right after the county had been founded. Frey, however, does not name a source, and his claim is thus unproven. According to a 1350 document, in which Nerzweiler had its first documentary mention, a lesser nobleman Endris genannt (“called”) Müller von Grumbach made it clear that Count Heinrich II of Veldenz had hired him as Burgmann for his Castle Lauterecken. Endris, however, could not actually live at the castle owing to a lack of room. Hence, he could only even show up at the castle whenever he was issued a special invitation. He was accorded remuneration of six pounds in Heller each year, which he had to claim yearly at the Amtmann’s office at Nertzwilre. In a 1377 document, a man called Henne Weber is named – or Hans – who worked at the weaver’s craft (indeed, his surname is German for “weaver”). This Henne Weber from Nertzwilre was one of 40 bondsmen for Gerhard von Lauterecken, his wife Gertrud and Henne Heinzmann’s sons. Gerhard von Lauterecken had pledged allegiance to Count Heinrich II of Veldenz and declared himself ready to pay one thousand Mainz Gulden should he fail to keep his word. In five further documents from Count of Veldenz Friedrich III’s time, the issuers make reference to the state of affairs between the County of Veldenz and Electoral Palatinate. Specifically, a significant part of the County of Veldenz was made up of Electoral Palatinate fiefs; that is to say, these areas originally belonged to the Electors Palatine, but they enfeoffed the Counts of Veldenz with these holdings, to be kept as hereditary holdings. The fiefs in question were the town of Kusel, the Michelsburg (castle) on the Remigiusberg, Castle Pettersheim, the whole Remigiusland and also the Ämter of Bosenbach and Nerzweiler. In the 1387, 1398, 1437 and 1443 documents, Count Friedrich III acknowledged receipt of these holdings from Electoral Palatinate. In a 1393 document, though, Ruprecht of Electoral Palatinate (as of 1398 Elector Palatine, and as of 1400 German King) granted Count Friedrich leave to grant his wife Margarethe of Nassau-Saarbrücken the Amt of Nerzweiler (and also the Amt of Bassenbach or Bosenbach) as a widow’s estate, meaning that, should the Countess outlive her husband, she could draw an income as a widow from these two Ämter. In 1444, the County of Veldenz met its end when Count Friedrich III of Veldenz died without a male heir. His daughter Anna wed King Ruprecht’s son Count Palatine Stephan. By uniting his own Palatine holdings with the now otherwise heirless County of Veldenz – his wife had inherited the county, but not her father’s title – and by redeeming the hitherto pledged County of Zweibrücken, Stephan founded a new County Palatine, as whose comital residence he chose the town of Zweibrücken: the County Palatine – later Duchy – of Palatinate-Zweibrücken. Even before 1444 had ended, Stephan shared the new County Palatine out between his sons Friedrich and Ludwig. In 1446, the former Veldenz territory was confirmed for the two brothers by the new Elector Palatine, Ludwig. Cropping up in this confirmation document, issued on 27 July 1446 in Alzey, for the very last time is a reference to the Amt of Nerzweiler. It is not known when, but sometime thereafter, the Amt seat was moved to Hundheim, and then the entity was always called in documents the Hundheimer Pflege (Pflege literally means “care”, but it was actually a local geopolitical unit). Dependence on a great number of lords in the dale afforded greater freedom than in other areas where united power and governing relationships prevailed. Legal matters within the Eßweiler Tal were governed by a whole range of Weistümer (singular: Weistum – cognate with English wisdom – this was a legal pronouncement issued by men learned in law in the Middle Ages and early modern times), which were already in force in the Middle Ages, although they were not actually set down in writing until the early 16th century. These documents are still preserved, and are said today to be prime examples of mediaeval jurisprudence. One deals with the court and borders, one is a Kanzelweistum (promulgated at church; Kanzel is German for “pulpit”), one is a Huberweistum (Huber were farmers who worked a whole Hube, which roughly corresponds to an “oxgang”), and one was a municipal Weistum (Gemeindeweistum).

=== Modern times ===
In 1537, the Reformation was introduced into the Eßweiler Tal. In the course of the 16th century, the Plague raged, and the villages were emptied of people. In Nerzweiler itself by 1575 were only ten people. With regard to the ruling class, this brought about a shift in power in 1595 as the high jurisdiction, hitherto held for some 250 years by the Waldgraves and Rhinegraves, was transferred to the Dukes of Zweibrücken. In return, Count Palatine Johannes I of Zweibrücken transferred the village of Kirchenbollenbach near Idar-Oberstein (nowadays a Stadtteil of that town) to the Rhinegraves. Lordship over the blood court thereby ended up in new hands, while the other lords named still otherwise held their tithing rights in the various villages. In 1614, Duke Johannes II of Zweibrücken traded his serfs in Teschenmoschel for some in the Eßweiler Tal belonging to Baron Johann Gottfried von Sickingen in Schallodenbach. Nerzweiler also suffered in the Thirty Years' War. Details are, however, unavailable. Another fundamental shift in the power structure came in 1755, when Duke Christian IV transferred Offenbach Abbey with the villages of Hundheim, Nerzweiler, Hinzweiler, Oberweiler, Oberaschbach and Niederaschbach (now vanished) and also the Hirsauer Kirche to the Rhinegraves of Grumbach, who until 1595 had exercised high jurisdiction in these villages. Nerzweiler thereafter remained in the Rhinegraviate until the collapse of the old feudal order in the course of the French Revolution.

==== Recent times ====
During the time of the French Revolution and the Napoleonic era that followed, the German lands on the Rhine’s left bank were annexed by France. The French thereby swept away all borders that had hitherto existed and established their own administrative entities. Roughly, the Glan formed the boundary between the Departments of Sarre and Mont-Tonnerre (or Donnersberg in German). Nerzweiler passed together with the villages of Aschbach, Hinzweiler, Hachenbach and Gumbsweiler to the newly founded Mairie (“Mayoralty”) of Hundheim, which itself belonged to the Canton of Lauterecken and the Arrondissement of Kaiserslautern. After the victory over Napoleon, the Congress of Vienna awarded a territory on the Rhine to the Kingdom of Bavaria, the Baierischer Rheinkreis (“Bavarian Rhine District”), later known as the Bayerische Rheinpfalz (“Bavarian Rhenish Palatinate”). Nerzweiler now belonged within this territory to the Bürgermeisterei (“Mayoralty”) of Hundheim in the Canton of Lauterecken and the Landkommissariat (later Bezirksamt, and later still Landkreis or District) of Kusel. Only in the time between 1880 and 1892 was Nerzweiler the Bürgermeisterei seat. In the late 1920s and early 1930s, the Nazi Party (NSDAP) became quite popular in Nerzweiler. In the 1928 Reichstag elections, 3.0% of the local votes went to Adolf Hitler’s party, but by the 1930 Reichstag elections, this had grown to 65.2%. By the time of the 1933 Reichstag elections, after Hitler had already seized power, local support for the Nazis had swollen to 98.1%. Hitler’s success in these elections paved the way for his Enabling Act of 1933 (Ermächtigungsgesetz), thus starting the Third Reich in earnest. Further changes in administrative structures came about not only through the Third Reich but also after the Second World War. The Palatinate was grouped into the then newly founded state of Rhineland-Palatinate, which itself undertook administrative restructuring in 1968. Thus, since 1 January 1972, Nerzweiler has belonged within the Kusel district to the Verbandsgemeinde of Lauterecken.

=== Population development ===
Nerzweiler was throughout the Middle Ages a small village, whose very existence was often threatened by such things as Plague and war. People earned their livelihoods mainly at farming. The naming of a wealthy weaver named Hans in the 1377 document can be taken as a clue that as early as the Middle Ages, weaving was a distinct craft. In 1477, two persons liable to pay the Maibede were named. In 1559, the following names are known from Nerzweiler: Daniel Jung, Hans Poth, Daniel Beller, Hans Lay, Bastian Krill and Jakob Anthes. Even before the Thirty Years' War, the village was heavily depopulated by the Plague. From the 17th century onwards, some villagers sought a living in the ore mines at the Königsberg. In the area near Hinzweiler was a limestone pit, which employed a few people. Near Nerzweiler itself were collieries on both sides of the dale, where men from the village sometimes also found work. In a 1743 statistical publication, all 14 fathers heading households were said to be free subjects. Five villagers worked at craft occupations besides working the land. There were one linen weaver, one miller, one tailor, one tanner and one shoemaker. Essentially, this occupational structure remained in place well into the 20th century. From the late 19th century until Weimar times, some Wandermusikanten (travelling musicians; see the Hinzweiler article for more about them) may have travelled the world. Since that time, the traditional craft businesses have disappeared utterly. Most villagers must now seek livelihoods elsewhere. The village's population peaked about 1870. Today, there are fewer people living in Nerzweiler than there were 200 years ago.

The following table shows population development over the centuries for Nerzweiler:

Year	1510	1743	1825	1827	1835	1850	1885	1905	1939	1962	1986	2001	2007
Total	10*	70	150	143	202	219	184	189	180	189	170	145	121

*This figure is the number of families.

=== Municipality’s name ===
Citing Johannes Hofmann once again, Nerzweiler supposedly has its name from a man named Narriseus, whom Hofmann held to be the village's founder, and thus the original name was Narriseusweiler. The village's name, Nerzweiler, indeed has the common German placename ending —weiler, which as a standalone word means “hamlet” (originally “homestead”), to which is prefixed a syllable Nerz—, but modern placename researchers do not all share Hofmann's interpretation of this prefix (although the ending's origin is indisputable). Researchers Dolch and Greule, for instance, believe it to have arisen from the personal name Nerizo, suggesting that an early settler named Nerizo founded the village. It cannot be said, however, just when the villages in the Eßweiler Tal with names ending in —weiler were founded. The time period in question is quite a long one, from the 8th century to the 12th. Nerzweiler had its first documentary mention in 1350, whereas the dale's other villages were all mentioned nearly a century earlier. These villages’ foundings might arguably be held to have taken place some 300 years before their first documentary mentions. In the document that first mentions Nerzweiler, its name is rendered Nertzwilre. Later forms of the village's name are: Nerzewilre (14th century), Nerzwilr (1443) and Nerzweiler (1575).

=== Vanished villages ===
Johannes Hofmann's 1595 description of the Eßweiler Tal also yields the following: “In the Nerzweiler domain, up at the end of the Rendbach dell, in former times the Mühlstein Junkers had a livestock farm, called Heinzenmauren”. Also mentioned was a house for lepers that stood on the road between Nerzweiler and Hinzweiler. Information about any actual former villages within Nerzweiler's current limits, however, is unavailable.

== Religion ==
The old Hirsauer Kirche was originally the spiritual hub for all villages in the Eßweiler Tal. When it was that a church was first built in Hirsau (not to be confused with Hirsau in Baden-Württemberg) cannot be determined today. It can be assumed nonetheless that there had been an earlier church standing at the same spot centuries before the one that still stands now was built (about 1100); it may have been wooden. Churchgoers came from throughout the dale to attend services, all weddings were held there, and so were all funerals and burials. It was also the thingstead, and on certain days, market was held there, too. Hirsau lost this central role when in 1451 the church in Hinzweiler was built, although originally this only functioned as a chapel of ease to Hirsau's parish church. This actually brought about competition between the two churches in the time that followed for the function of parish church. As early as 1526, the Duchy of Palatinate-Zweibrücken introduced the Reformation into the church of the Oberamt of Meisenheim, replacing Catholic belief with Martin Luther’s teachings so that bit by bit, church services in the Eßweiler Tal, too, began to be conducted in accordance with the Reformation. The Offenbach Monastery, to which the Hinzweiler church was subject, at first opposed Reformist efforts. In 1555, though, the Rhinegraves of Grumbach, too, introduced the Reformation, and in 1588, the Offenbach Monastery was dissolved. In 1562, Eßweiler got its own graveyard. After the Counts Palatine of Zweibrücken had become absolute fiefholders over the Eßweiler Tal in 1795, worshippers then had to convert to Calvinism in line with developments in the County Palatine. Beginning in 1601, Hinzweiler became the temporary parish seat, but already by 1610, it once again had to yield this function to Hirsau, only to get it back after the Thirty Years' War. This structure remains in place to this day. In earlier days, Nerzweiler's inhabitants were mainly Reformed, according to John Calvin’s teachings. As minorities, there were Lutherans, who in 1818 merged with the Calvinists. Catholic Christians were not found in Nerzweiler until the early 19th century, and even thereafter, only sporadically. In 1743, out of 14 households, only two belonged to the Lutheran faith, while none belonged to either the Catholic or the Jewish faith. In 1825, only Protestants lived in the village, that is, former Calvinists and Lutherans after the 1818 Protestant Union. In 1961, among the 180 inhabitants was one Catholic.

== Politics ==
=== Municipal council ===
The council is made up of 6 council members, who were elected by majority vote at the municipal election held on 7 June 2009, and the honorary mayor as chairman.

=== Mayor ===
Nerzweiler’s mayor is Michael Hildebrand.

=== Coat of arms ===
The municipality’s arms might be described thus: Per fess Or a demilion gules armed and langued azure and vert a cuckoo argent.

The charge in the upper field is the lion once borne as an heraldic device by the Rhinegraves of Grumbach, who held the area until 1793. The charge in the lower field is a cuckoo, which here symbolizes a nickname used for the villagers, “Kuckuck” (“Cuckoo” in German).

The arms have been borne since 5 September 1985.

== Culture and sightseeing ==
=== Regular events ===
Nerzweiler holds its kermis (church consecration festival) on the third weekend in August. In 2000, the Ortsgemeinde staged a village festival in connection with the 650-year jubilee of its first documentary mention, with an exhibition of old pictures from local history, which found great favour among the public. Other old customs are hardly kept at all.

=== Clubs ===
Clubs are not very strongly represented in this small village, but Nerzweiler does have a singing club, a country youth group and a promotional association for the fire brigade and the municipality.

== Economy and infrastructure ==
=== Economic structure ===
Nerzweiler was formerly purely a farming village. A livestock headcount in 1928 yielded figures of 27 horses, 208 head of cattle, 79 pigs, 22 goats, 547 chickens and 10 bee colonies. In earlier times, both a mill and a small tannery stood on the brook. According to a 1744 report, the mill had two waterwheels and two sets of millstones. Peter Hornbacher was at that time the Erbbeständer (holder of the Erbbestand, a uniquely German landhold arrangement in which ownership rights and usage rights were separated; this is forbidden by law in modern Germany). There were also collieries during the 18th century with some 5 or 6 galleries in the “Wernesacker”, “in der Hölle” and “im Bächel” districts. Newer pits were worked between 1821 and 1869. The workforce of 12 men in the beginning, though, shrank over time to six. In the long run, 12 964 t of coal were mined each year.

=== Education ===
Schooling experienced a general upswing beginning in the time of the Reformation. However, an end would have been put to it no later than the Thirty Years' War (1618-1648). About the Nerzweiler school's beginnings, little is known. It is likely that there was a winter school (a school geared towards an agricultural community's practical needs, held in the winter, when farm families had a bit more time to spare) in the 18th century. School documents in the Speyer State Archive tell the reader that in 1845, a prospective schoolteacher named Wilhelm Hahn was teaching school lessons at a private dwelling. Hahn was soon asked to find a new job, since he was to be replaced by a schoolteacher who held a diploma. This successor at the Protestant school was Heinrich Engel, born in 1824 in Einöllen, and he was named the regular teacher in 1856. Because the municipality's finances were never very strong, there were time and again disputes between the municipality and Engel, and later his successors, over wages and municipal benefits. In 1862, Engel demanded 650 Rhenish guilders that the municipality had not paid him during his time in service. The number of pupils throughout that time was more than fifty in seven grade levels, from a population of somewhat more than 200 (1850/1851: 53; 1851/1852: 56). The municipality had a new schoolhouse built in 1870, and at the same time, it laid out its own graveyard. Because of the financial hardship brought about by this, it also sold the municipal woodland to the municipality of Aschbach. It is said that this is why Nerzweiler villagers were given the nickname “Kuckuck” (“Cuckoo”, although in German, it seems that this word does not bear the same connotation of madness as in English). Heinrich Engel was in the beginning quite assiduous about his duties, but over time, carelessness and neglect began to show up in his work, perhaps brought about by his meagre wages. In 1877, he had to be pensioned off early after becoming sick. His successor was Jacob Förster from Hinterweidenthal. About him, too, there were soon complaints, and in 1879 he was transferred to Blaubach. Several administrators over the following two years led classes, until Peter Lang was hired in 1881. Lang, who was born in 1848, was actually from Nerzweiler itself. In 1896, he also took on the office of computer at the Hundheim-Nerzweiler credit union, but he, likewise, had to seek early retirement owing to illness in 1897. Then, the teaching post was filled many times over by teachers who only stayed a short time, until from 1912 to 1923 Rudolf Brügel taught. He was transferred to Hütschenhausen in 1923. The village's last schoolteacher was Armin Hübner. In 1967, the school in Nerzweiler was dissolved. Schoolchildren at first had to go to the central school in Sankt Julian, but then later to the primary school-Hauptschule in Offenbach-Hundheim.

=== Transport ===
Nerzweiler lies on Landesstraße 273, which links Rothselberg with Offenbach-Hundheim. South of the village, Landesstraße 368 branches off Landesstraße 273, leading eastwards to the Lauter valley. Landesstraße 368 leads from neighbouring Hinzweiler by way of Horschbach and Welchweiler to Altenglan. The Kusel and Kaiserslautern Autobahn interchanges lie respectively 20 and 30 km away. To the north runs Bundesstraße 420. The nearest railway stations are the ones in Lauterecken 6 km away, and Wolfstein 8 km away, both on the Lautertalbahn.
