= Hinzweiler =

- Municipality
- Coat of arms

- Location of Hinzweiler within Kusel district
- Interactive map of Hinzweiler
- Location within Germany Location within Rhineland-Palatinate
- Coordinates: 49°35′29″N 7°32′54″E
- Country: Germany
- State: Rhineland-Palatinate
- District: Kusel
- Municipal assoc.: Lauterecken-Wolfstein

Government
  - Mayor (2019–24): Gunter Suffel

Area
  - Total: 5.32 km^{2} (2.05 sq mi)
- Elevation: 208 m (682 ft)

Population (2025-12-31)
  - Total: 292
  - Density: 54.9/km^{2} (142/sq mi)
- Time zone: UTC+01:00 (CET)
  - Summer (DST): UTC+02:00 (CEST)
- Postal codes: 67756
- Dialling codes: 06304
- Vehicle registration: KUS
- Website: www.hinzweiler.de

Hinzweiler (German pronunciation: [ˈhɪntsvaɪlɐ]) is an Ortsgemeinde – a municipality belonging to a Verbandsgemeinde, a kind of collective municipality – in the Kusel district in Rhineland-Palatinate, Germany. It belongs to the Verbandsgemeinde Lauterecken-Wolfstein.

== Geography ==
=== Location ===
The municipality lies in the Eßweiler Tal (dale) northwest of the Königsberg (mountain) in the North Palatine Uplands at an elevation of some 200 m above sea level. Elevations on the right bank at the Königsberg reach above 500 m above sea level (Leienberg 524 m). On the left bank, they reach only a bit more than 300 m above sea level (Spenzelberg 305 m). The municipal area measures 532 ha, of which roughly 32 ha is settled and 200 ha is wooded.

=== Neighbouring municipalities ===
Hinzweiler borders in the north on the municipality of Nerzweiler, in the east on the municipality of Aschbach, in the south on the municipality of Oberweiler im Tal, in the west on the municipality of Horschbach and in the northwest on the municipality of Glanbrücken.

=== Constituent communities ===
Also belonging to Hinzweiler is the outlying homestead of Mühlbergerhof.

=== Municipality’s layout ===
Landesstraße 372 runs through the village of Hinzweiler from north to south, on the brook's right bank in the north of the village and on its left in the south. Nevertheless, the village cannot be considered a true linear village, for in the village centre, where the road crosses the brook, other built-up streets branch off the thoroughfare to the southeast and east. Indeed, it is also here that the older part of the built-up area is found. The church stands in the south of this old village centre. The great Königslandhalle with its civic centre dominates the view in the village centre's north. The sporting ground lies to the village's west on the Talbach's left bank, while the graveyard lies at the village's south end by the road to Horschbach.

== History ==
=== Antiquity ===
Going by the many archaeological finds from the broader area around Hinzweiler, it can be assumed that the immediate area was likewise settled in the Bronze Age and the Iron Age, and perhaps even as early as the New Stone Age. In the 19th century, a prehistoric barrow was discovered within Hinzweiler's limits. Its whereabouts are, however, no longer known today. In Roman times, too, people lived in Hinzweiler's immediate vicinity. Bearing witness hereto is a piece of spolia at the churchtower, which shows a portrait of Hercules with abundant hair and beard. It may once have been part of a dedication stone at a sanctuary somewhere nearby.

=== Middle Ages ===
Hinzweiler to a great extent shares the same history as all other villages in the Eßweiler Tal, which in many respects form a unit. Besides Hinzweiler itself, these were originally Hundheim (Neuenglan), Hachenbach, Nerzweiler, Aschbach, Horschbach, Oberweiler, Elzweiler, Eßweiler and the now vanished villages of Letzweiler, Niederaschbach, Nörweiler, Mittelhofen, Zeizelbach, Füllhof, Neideck and Lanzweiler. It is certain that these villages lay within the free Imperial domain around the royal castle at Lautern (Kaiserslautern). In the 9th century, likely shortly before 870, the nobleman Hererich was enfeoffed with the Eßweiler Tal and shortly before his death he bequeathed it to Prüm Abbey. This area's ecclesiastical hub was at first the Hirsauer Kirche, an old country church, now no longer used, that still stands near Hundheim. Hundheim at this time, still bore the name Glena or Glan, and was perhaps “Neuenglan” (Nieuwen Glena) as opposed to the place still called “Altenglan” (Gleni). This Glena was Hun's seat, Hun being an administrator of sorts who oversaw the whole dale for the actual lords. His name gave the seat lying at the mouth of the Talbach (“Dale Brook”), where it empties into the Glan, its name, Hundheim (the first syllable's resemblance to the Modern High German word for “dog” might be folk etymology; Heim is still German for “home” today).

Sometime before 1222, Prüm Abbey lost its holdings in the Glan valley, the circumstances under which this happened now being unknown. Named in later times were only the 14 feudal lords who exercised special rights in the Eßweiler Tal and could rightfully take a share of the tithes, namely the Junker Mühlenstein von Grumbach as the Rhinegraves’ vassal, the County Palatine of Zweibrücken, Offenbach Abbey, Remigiusberg Abbey, Tholey Abbey, Enkenbach Abbey, the Knights Hospitaller commandry at Sulzbach, the Church of Zweibrücken, the Church of Sankt Julian, the Church of Hinzweiler, the Stangenjunker of Lauterecken, the House of Blick von Lichtenberg, the Lords of Mauchenheim and the Lords of Mickelheim. Obviously, each fiefholder held a different administrative seat. The Waldgraves and Rhinegraves, as holders of high jurisdiction, resided above the Lords of Mühlenstein (later Cratz von Scharfenstein) who resided near the Hirsauer Kirche and at the Springeburg (or Sprengelburg; the ruin still stands today between Eßweiler and Oberweiler im Tal).

The Counts of Veldenz, as feudal lords over the dale's “poor people” (as of 1444, this was instead the Counts Palatine of Zweibrücken) chose as their seat the village of Nerzweiler, which between 1350 and 1446 was always named in documents as the seat of the Nerzweiler Amt. Count Friedrich III of Veldenz granted his wife Margarethe of Nassau-Saarbrücken this Amt as a widow's estate. After 1446, Hundheim once again appeared as the only administrative seat. Hinzweiler itself got its own church in 1451, and became the parish's hub in the Eßweiler Tal instead of the Hirsauer Kirche. Dependence on a great number of lords in the dale afforded greater freedom than in other areas where united power and governing relationships prevailed.

Legal matters within the Eßweiler Tal were governed by a whole range of Weistümer (singular: Weistum – cognate with English wisdom – this was a legal pronouncement issued by men learned in law in the Middle Ages and early modern times), which were already in force in the Middle Ages, although they were not actually set down in writing until the early 16th century. These documents are still preserved, and are said today to be prime examples of mediaeval jurisprudence. One deals with the court and borders, one is a Kanzelweistum (promulgated at church; Kanzel is German for “pulpit”), one is a Huberweistum (Huber were farmers who worked a whole Hube, which roughly corresponds to an “oxgang”), and one was a municipal Weistum (Gemeindeweistum).

=== Modern times ===
As early as 1526, the Reformation was introduced into the Eßweiler Tal. In the course of the 16th century, the Plague raged in the dale and the villages’ inhabitants were largely wiped out. In Hinzweiler itself, only 15 people were left by 1575. With regard to the ruling class, this brought about a shift in power in 1595 as the high jurisdiction, hitherto held for some 250 years by the Waldgraves and Rhinegraves, was transferred to the Dukes of Zweibrücken. In return, Count Palatine Johannes I of Zweibrücken transferred the village of Kirchenbollenbach near Idar-Oberstein (nowadays a Stadtteil of that town) to the Rhinegraves. Lordship over the blood court thereby ended up in new hands, while the other lords named still otherwise held their tithing rights in the various villages.

In 1614, Duke Johannes II of Zweibrücken traded his serfs in Teschenmoschel for some in the Eßweiler Tal belonging to Baron Johann Gottfried von Sickingen in Schallodenbach. Hinzweiler also suffered in the Thirty Years' War. Details are, however, unavailable. Another fundamental shift in the power structure came in 1755, when Duke Christian IV transferred to Offenbach Abbey the villages of Hundheim, Nerzweiler, Hinzweiler, Oberweiler, Oberaschbach and Niederaschbach (now vanished) and also the Hirsauer Kirche to the Rhinegraves of Grumbach, who until 1595 had exercised high jurisdiction in these villages. Hinzweiler thereafter remained in the Rhinegraviate until the collapse of the old feudal order in the course of the French Revolution.

==== Recent times ====
During the time of the French Revolution and the Napoleonic era that followed, the German lands on the Rhine’s left bank were annexed by France. The French thereby swept away all borders that had hitherto existed and established their own administrative entities. Roughly, the Glan formed the boundary between the Departments of Sarre and Mont-Tonnerre (or Donnersberg in German). Hinzweiler passed together with the villages of Aschbach, Nerzweiler, Hachenbach and Gumbsweiler to the newly founded Mairie (“Mayoralty”) of Hundheim, which itself belonged to the Canton of Lauterecken and the Arrondissement of Kaiserslautern. After the victory over Napoleon, the Congress of Vienna awarded a territory on the Rhine to the Kingdom of Bavaria, the Baierischer Rheinkreis (“Bavarian Rhine District”), later known as the Bayerische Rheinpfalz (“Bavarian Rhenish Palatinate”). Hinzweiler now belonged within this territory to the Bürgermeisterei (“Mayoralty”) of Hundheim in the Canton of Lauterecken and the Landkommissariat (later Bezirksamt, and later still Landkreis or District) of Kusel.

In the late 1920s and early 1930s, the Nazi Party (NSDAP) became quite popular in Hinzweiler. In the 1928 Reichstag elections, none of the local votes went to Adolf Hitler’s party, but by the 1930 Reichstag elections, this had grown to 0.4%. By the time of the 1933 Reichstag elections, after Hitler had already seized power, local support for the Nazis had swollen to 77%. Hitler’s success in these elections paved the way for his Enabling Act of 1933 (Ermächtigungsgesetz), thus starting the Third Reich in earnest. Further changes in administrative structures came about not only through the Third Reich but also after the Second World War. The Palatinate was grouped into the then newly founded state of Rhineland-Palatinate, which itself undertook administrative restructuring in 1968. Thus, since 1972, Hinzweiler has belonged within the Kusel district to the Verbandsgemeinde of Wolfstein.

=== Musikanten ===
In 19th-century Hinzweiler, jobs were always hard to come by, and thus Hinzweiler, along with Eßweiler, Jettenbach and Mackenbach, became a centre of the West Palatine Musikantentum ("musicianhood"). A great part of the male population, but also some of the female population, too, learnt to play one or more musical instruments, joined an orchestra and went abroad in the spring. In autumn, they came back from the Netherlands, England and Scandinavia. All through the winter, houses in the village rang with rehearsals.

Some orchestras chose destinations that were much farther away and did not return for years. Some went to the Near East, some to the Americas, and some even as far as Australia and New Zealand. Wives sometimes went along to look after their menfolk, and children were born overseas as well.

These “minstrels” brought earnings back home with them, investing them in cropland, livestock, houses and farms. Many became wealthy farmers. Some also settled abroad.

In 1905, the number of these musicians from Hinzweiler who were working abroad was 71. One such musician was Otto Schwarz. The tradition ended, though, with the outbreak of the First World War.

=== Jewish history ===
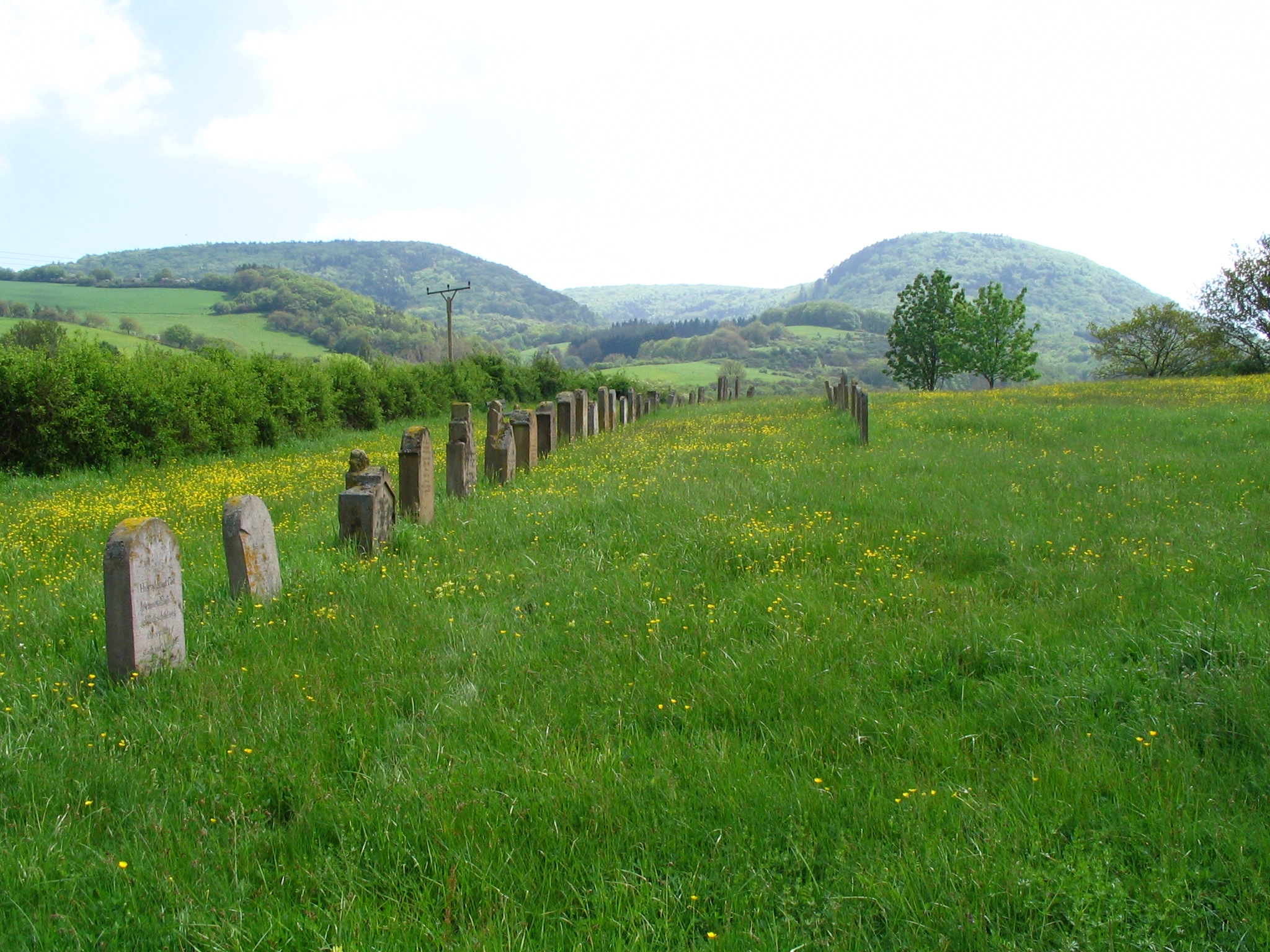
The Jewish graveyard in Hinzweiler

Within the territory of the Duchy of Palatinate-Zweibrücken, there was generally little tolerance for Jews. Owing to a few exceptions, mainly after the Thirty Years' War, when the population had been heavily decimated, a few Jewish families managed to settle. In the Eßweiler Tal, the small region where Hinzweiler lies, the centre of Jewish life was mainly in Eßweiler.

After the French Revolution, the situation for Jews changed. Despite a certain limitation imposed by one of Napoleon’s edicts, they could engage in trade and were seen in the agricultural realm mostly as livestock and horse dealers. Hinzweiler citizens esteemed the Jews as tradesmen. Some even learnt “Hebrew” (actually Yiddish) so that they could better deal with the Jews.

Under Bavarian rule, the situation improved appreciably. In 1836, there were 36 Jews living in Hinzweiler. They were becoming ever more integrated and felt themselves to be Germans, simply ones with a different religion. In the First World War there was no dearth of volunteers from among the Jews, who went to war for Germany.

Growing antisemitism, however – even before the beginning of the Third Reich – made many Jews choose emigration, while some also moved to Germany's cities. However, those who could not get themselves to safety in time were rounded up by the Nazis on 22 October 1940 and deported to Gurs in southwestern France, whence they were further sent to the death camps.

The picture shows the Jewish graveyard in Hinzweiler with 38 gravestones, which dates from 1870. In 1963, the stones were “fetched out of the wilderness”, as reported by Heinz Mahler. In the early 1970s, the graveyard was given a makeover. The last burial there was in the mid 1920s, a young man from Eßweiler.

=== Population development ===
Hinzweiler was throughout the Middle Ages a small village, whose very existence was often threatened by such things as Plague and war. After the Plague of 1564, Hinzweiler had only 15 inhabitants left. People earned their livelihoods mainly at farming. Some may have sought a living in the ore mines at the Königsberg. In the area right near Hinzweiler itself was a limestone pit, which employed a few people. In a 1735 statistical publication, of the 25 men who headed families, 22 were said to be free subjects and 3 were said to be Hintersassen (roughly, “dependent peasants”). Among craftsmen, who only worked the land as a secondary occupation, there were four shoemakers, three linen weavers, two tailors, one blacksmith, one miller and one wainwright. This basic structure remained in place even well into the 20th century.

Nevertheless, in the late 19th century until Weimar times, the regional industry involving local musicians travelling to many parts of Europe and beyond, called Wandermusikantentum, was quite well developed in Hinzweiler. The first of these “wandering minstrels” known to have come from Hinzweiler were Georg Volles (1823), Heinrich Werner and Karl Krebs. It was in this time that a firm of piano builders arose in the village, named Eichler. All these customary craft occupations have since disappeared. Most of the villagers nowadays must seek their livelihoods outside the village. In the late 18th century, Jews settled in Hinzweiler. At times in the 19th century, their share of the population reached 10%. Current population trends are influenced by the village's quiet location, and partly also by the location's favourability to the shopping and commercial centre of Kaiserslautern. Nonetheless, what can be observed today is a stagnation in the population figures and at the same time a rise in the inhabitants’ average age.

The following table shows population development over the centuries for Hinzweiler, with some figures broken down by religious denomination:

Year	1563	1609	1735	1802	1825	1827	1835	1850	1860	1867	1875	1885	1900	1910	1939	1958	1961	1978	1986	2000	2001
Total	0	104	100	137	332	279	387	290	399	416	461	496	503	490	458	459	511	464	470	460	480
Calvinist				110	–												–
Catholic				–	2												1
Evangelical				–	302												509
Jewish				16	28												–
Lutheran				11	–												–

In 1563, the village had been wholly wiped out by the Plague, which struck and depopulated the whole Eßweiler Tal. The figure for 1609 represents 20 families. No exact population figure for 1675 is known, but it is recorded that there were 13 families in Hinzweiler in the years after the Thirty Years' War. The second source listed contradicts the figure for 1802 by listing 244 inhabitants for that year. Whether the 1961 total includes one irreligious person is unclear. It could also be a typographical error in the source.

=== Municipality’s name ===
The village's name, Hinzweiler, has the common German placename ending —weiler, which as a standalone word means “hamlet” (originally “homestead”), to which is prefixed a syllable Hinz—, believed to have arisen from a personal name, Hinzo, suggesting that an early settler named Hinzo founded the village. Nevertheless, it is only with difficulty that anyone can confirm when the villages in the Eßweiler Tal with names ending in —weiler were founded. The time period in question is quite a long one, from the 8th century to the 12th. With the exception of Nerzweiler, their first documentary mentions came in the latter half of the 13th century. The foundings of these villages might arguably be put about 300 years earlier than the first documentary mentions. Hinzweiler had its first documentary mention in 1263 as Hennesweiler. The content of the document in question has only been handed down as a copy. Among other names that the village bore through the ages were Hinzwiller (original document, 1336), Huntzwilre (1393), Huntzwyler (1451), Hintzweyler (1566) and Hintzweiller (1666). The forms with —u— might suggest that the village was the seat of a lower official named Hun or Hund.

=== Vanished villages ===
In Johannes Hofmann's description of the Eßweiler Tal, one reads: “In Hinzweiler’s municipal area, up at the rectory near an den Kreuzäckern (a rural cadastral name) not far from the Zeßelbacher Grund, hewn stone blocks from old buildings, also old coins and other things have also been found, indicating that long ago a village stood right there, called Zeßelbach”. Hence, this village was no longer there by 1595. No further information about Zeselbach near Hinzweiler is available.

== Religion ==
The old Hirsauer Kirche was originally the spiritual hub for all villages in the Eßweiler Tal. When it was that a church was first built in Hirsau (not to be confused with Hirsau in Baden-Württemberg) cannot be determined today. It can be assumed nonetheless that there had been an earlier church standing at the same spot centuries before the one that still stands now was built (about 1100); it may have been wooden. Churchgoers came from throughout the dale to attend services, all weddings were held there, and so were all funerals and burials. It was also the thingstead, and on certain days, market was held there, too. Hirsau lost this central role when in 1451 the church in Hinzweiler was built, although originally this only functioned as a chapel of ease to Hirsau's parish church. This actually brought about competition between the two churches in the time that followed for the function of parish church.

As early as 1526, the Duchy of Palatinate-Zweibrücken introduced the Reformation into the church of the Oberamt of Meisenheim, replacing Catholic belief with Martin Luther’s teachings so that bit by bit, church services in the Eßweiler Tal, too, began to be conducted in accordance with the Reformation. The Offenbach Monastery, to which the Hinzweiler church was subject, at first opposed Reformist efforts. In 1555, though, the Rhinegraves of Grumbach, too, introduced the Reformation, and in 1588, the Offenbach Monastery was dissolved. After the Counts Palatine of Zweibrücken had become absolute fiefholders over the Eßweiler Tal in 1595, worshippers then had to convert to Calvinism in line with developments in the County Palatine. Beginning in 1601, Hinzweiler became the temporary parish seat, but already by 1610, it once again had to yield this function to Hirsau, only to get it back after the Thirty Years' War. This structure remains in place to this day. In earlier days, Hinzweiler's inhabitants were mainly Reformed, according to John Calvin’s teachings. As minorities, there were Lutherans, who in 1818 merged with the Calvinists, and Jews.

In 1870, the Jews had their own graveyard laid out. Many gravestones with mostly Hebrew inscriptions are preserved. Catholic Christians were not found in Hinzweiler until the early 19th century, and even thereafter, only sporadically. Of the church in Hinzweiler, only the quire under the tower actually goes back to the original building date, about 1450. About 1600, a tower was built over the quire. The original Gothic nave was torn down in the 18th century, likely because it had fallen into disrepair, and a new nave was built in 1727 north of the tower in an aisleless configuration with a three-sided end wall and a flat ceiling. Impressive is the painting on the ceiling from 1974 by Günter Humbert with its colour symbolism and representations of the Four Evangelists with the Lamb of God, the pelican as a symbol of self-sacrifice and the dove as a symbol of peace. Worthy of note in the tower area are a piece of Roman spolia set in the outer wall bearing a representation of Hercules and remnants of late mediaeval paintings inside. These fresco-secco paintings were only discovered – and uncovered – in 1974. They show Jesus Christ enthroned with Mary as intercessor for the faithful.

== Politics ==
=== Municipal council ===
The council is made up of 8 council members, who were elected by majority vote at the municipal election held on 7 June 2009, and the honorary mayor as chairman.

=== Mayor ===
Hinzweiler's mayor is Gunter Suffel, and his deputies are Karl-Heinz Kondratiuk and Fredi Klein.

=== Coat of arms ===
Sources differ on how the German blazon reads. The first listed appears on the website, while the second is that published by Debus:

1. Unter rotem durch Wellenlinie geteilten Schildhaupt in Gold auf grünem Dreiberg eine rote Lyra.
2. Unter gewelltem roten Schildhaupt in Gold auf grünem Dreiberg eine rote Lyra.

Either way, the municipality's arms might in English heraldic language be described thus: Under a chief wavy gules Or in base a mount of three vert above which a lyre of the first.

The central charge, the lyre, stands for the history of travelling musicians – Wandermusikantentum – that was well represented in Hinzweiler. The wavy line at the bottom of the chief represents the dale – the Eßweiler Tal – in which Hinzweiler lies. The mount of three (Dreiberg in German) is supposed to symbolize the Königsberg. The tinctures gules and Or (red and gold) are a reference to the village's former allegiance to the Rhinegraves. An older coat of arms was “Vert a bezant” (that is, a green field with a gold orb).

== Culture and sightseeing ==
=== Buildings ===
The following are listed buildings or sites in Rhineland-Palatinate’s Directory of Cultural Monuments:

- Protestant parish church, Hauptstraße 44 – aisleless church, marked 1727, late mediaeval quire, above which a belltower about 1600; clergyman's gravestone, 1741
- Hauptstraße 47 – stately three-sided estate; complex with single roof ridge, about 1830, five-axis house 1868
- Hauptstraße 48 – Protestant rectory; plastered building in Rundbogenstil, 1835/1836, architect Ferdinand Beyschlag, Kaiserslautern
- Jewish graveyard, near Bergstraße 7 (monumental zone) – area bordered by hedge, opened in 1870, 57 gravestones

=== Regular events ===
Hinzweiler holds its kermis (church consecration festival) on the third weekend in October. No other special customs are known to be observed in the village.

=== Clubs ===
The following clubs are active in Hinzweiler:

- Feuerwehrförderverein — fire brigade promotional association
- Förderverein der Ortsgemeinde — municipal promotional association
- Karnevalverein — Carnival club
- Kindergartenförderverein — kindergarten promotional association
- Königsbergverein mit Wanderhütte — hiking
- Krankenpflegeverein — nursing
- Landfrauenverein — countrywomen's club
- Männergesangverein — men's singing club
- Musikverein — music club
- Pfälzerwaldverein — hiking
- Schützenverein (Schützengilde Königsberg) — shooting sports
- SPD-Ortsverein — Social Democratic Party of Germany local chapter
- Sportverein — sport club
- Verein der Freien Wählergruppe — Free Voter Group local chapter

== Economy and infrastructure ==
=== Economic structure ===
Agriculture is still an important branch of the economy in Hinzweiler even today. The biggest craft business in the village is one that lays floors. Among service-sector businesses are two inns and some full-time insurance agencies. One dentist is in practice in the village. Another business in Hinzweiler buys, sells and restores antique furniture.

=== Education ===
Schooling experienced a general upswing beginning in the time of the Reformation. As early as 1604, the Eßweiler Tal church community made an application to the Zweibrücken government to hire a teacher who could teach the children Latin, while a teacher for the “German school” had already been hired. If this actually did lead to the founding of a Latin school, it did not last very long. An end would have been put to it no later than the Thirty Years' War (1618-1648). When no teacher was available to teach lessons in Hinzweiler in the late 16th century, the pastor had to take over the teaching duties. It is likely that a candidate for a pastoral post was hired as a teacher.

Records from 1762 show that Hinzweiler had not only a Reformed (Calvinist) school but also a Lutheran “main school”, that is to say, a school with year-round classes, supported by villages in the area that had Lutheran winter schools (schools geared towards an agricultural community's practical needs, held in the winter, when farm families had a bit more time to spare) with payments in money and kind. Hence, the Lutheran school in Hinzweiler received from Horschbach one Malter, three barrels and one Sester of corn (meaning rye in this case) and in cash, four Rhenish guilders, 13 Batzen and seven Pfennig. The Reformed school in Hinzweiler was overseen then by an ecclesiastical school inspector (a clergyman) from Odenbach. In general there were not yet actual schoolhouses in the villages, and classes were conducted in private houses or on municipally owned premises. The first in Hinzweiler was built in 1844, and another was built in 1905. It is known from Bavarian times that beginning in 1840 Johann Adam Drumm, born on 26 March 1817 in Erdesbach, taught school in Hinzweiler after having been discharged from military service in 1839. He had a great many schoolchildren to teach in the original one-room schoolhouse and thus he asked to be allowed to hire an assistant. Drumm was also a sexton, received a great deal of free firewood and was allowed to use the school's extensive lands. Among other things, he had the right to keep six wethers. His rent and the benefits offered him actually worked out to only a small net amount afterwards. Adam Drumm died in November 1863. His successor was Friedrich Maurer, who was chosen by the municipality out of eight applicants.

In 1869, Maurer petitioned the Royal government for leave to marry Maria Eberhard from Kindenheim. Maurer's relationship with the municipality did not remain untroubled for long. There was a dispute over the service to the church, which Maurer no longer wanted to do. In 1870, a knitting school was opened. In 1913, the municipality hired a second teacher, and the schoolhouse had to be expanded. In 1934, the eighth grade level was to be introduced, but the Nazi régime would not approve the application to do so. Today, primary school pupils and Hauptschule students attend their respective schools in Wolfstein.

=== Public institutions ===
Hinzweiler has one kindergarten and an event and sport hall.

=== Transport ===
Hinzweiler lies on Landesstraße 372, which links Rothselberg to Offenbach-Hundheim. North of the village, Landesstraße 368 branches off Landesstraße 372, forming a link to the east, by way of Aschbach to the Lauter valley. Another road that branches off, Landesstraße 368, leads from the village's south end by way of Horschbach and Welchweiler to Altenglan. To the east runs Bundesstraße 270. The nearest Autobahn interchanges, at Kusel and Kaiserslautern, lie 18 km and 30 km away respectively. Serving Wolfstein's outlying centre of Reckweilerhof is a railway station on the Lautertalbahn, roughly 8 km away.

== Famous people ==
=== Sons and daughters of the town ===
- Simon Wolf (1836-1923), lawyer and politician in the United States
- Daniel Schwarz (1851–1885), father of Otto Schwarz, and travelling bandleader, who led the Schwarz Band in Harrogate, England.
- Otto Schwarz (1876-1961), Son of Daniel Schwarz. Musikant
