= Glanbrücken =

- Municipality
- Flag Coat of arms

- Location of Glanbrücken within Kusel district
- Interactive map of Glanbrücken
- Location within Germany Location within Rhineland-Palatinate
- Coordinates: 49°36′43″N 7°31′45″E
- Country: Germany
- State: Rhineland-Palatinate
- District: Kusel
- Municipal assoc.: Lauterecken-Wolfstein
- Subdivisions: 2

Government
  - Mayor (2019–24): Guido Hablitz

Area
  - Total: 4.59 km^{2} (1.77 sq mi)
- Elevation: 175 m (574 ft)

Population (2025-12-31)
  - Total: 469
  - Density: 102/km^{2} (265/sq mi)
- Time zone: UTC+01:00 (CET)
  - Summer (DST): UTC+02:00 (CEST)
- Postal codes: 66887
- Dialling codes: 06387
- Vehicle registration: KUS

Glanbrücken is an Ortsgemeinde – a municipality belonging to a Verbandsgemeinde, a kind of collective municipality – in the Kusel district in Rhineland-Palatinate, Germany. It belongs to the Verbandsgemeinde Lauterecken-Wolfstein.

== Geography ==
=== Location ===
The municipality lies on the river Glan in the Western Palatinate. The municipal area measures 458 ha, of which 185 ha is wooded.

==== Hachenbach ====
The Ortsteil of Hachenbach lies at an elevation of 175 m above sea level on the Glan's right bank at the lower end of the southward-running valley of the Horschbach, which here empties into the Glan. The community, which is built in the dale and also on the slope of the hill known as "Auf der Platte", lies mostly in a row along the road between Horschbach and Hundheim and the community core lies right at the old bridge across the river. The highest point in the outlying countryside is found on the high expanse in the cadastral area "Auf der Platte". This lies at 310 m above sea level.

==== Niedereisenbach ====
The Ortsteil of Niedereisenbach lies on the Glan's left bank, 172 m above sea level, at the mouth of the Eisenbach, which flows into the community from the west. The north side of the hollow abuts a foothill of the so-called Kipp, which borders the Glan valley all the way to Offenbach in a broad bow. In the west, a ridge ends here that bounds the Glan valley from Niederalben northwestwards. In the upper part of the community, the Bächelsgraben, running from the north, empties into the Eisenbach. The old community core lies at the lower end of the side dales that join together near Niedereisenbach. The newer part of the built-up area stands in a row along the main road running through the Glan valley. The highest point in the outlying countryside is found in the cadastral area "Auf Hardt", which has an elevation of 339 m above sea level.

=== Neighbouring municipalities ===
Glanbrücken borders in the north on the municipality of Deimberg, in the east on the municipality of Offenbach-Hundheim, in the southeast on the municipalities of Nerzweiler and Hinzweiler, in the south on the municipality of Horschbach and in the west on the municipality of Sankt Julian.

=== Constituent communities ===
Glanbrücken's Ortsteile are Hachenbach south of the Glan and Niedereisenbach on the north bank. There is no centre within the municipality named "Glanbrücken". This name was coined in 1969 for the then newly amalgamated municipality.

=== Municipality’s layout ===
==== Hachenbach ====
This community's appearance is characterized by its location on the river Glan. The most important streets (Horschbacher Straße, Dorfstraße and Hirsauer Straße) run parallel to the Horschbach and the Glan. Horschbacher Straße leads straight to the bridge over the Glan. Even the street "An den Mühlen" ("At the Mills") beyond the bridge lies within the Ortsteil of Hachenbach. Before reaching the bridge, Dorfstraße ("Village Street") branches off eastwards from Horschbacher Straße, then crossing the Horschbach and turning southwards. Once over the Horschbach, Hirsauer Straße branches off Dorfstraße, then running, in stretches as a rural path, all the way to the well known Hirsauer Kirche, an old 12th-century aisleless church that was once the hub of a regional parish, and to the neighbouring village of Hundheim. The graveyard lies at the community's south end near where Kreisstraße 26 branches off Horschbacher Straße. Formerly, Hachenbach was almost purely a farming village. Today the community is purely residential, with villagers commuting to jobs, mainly in Kaiserslautern. There are still two full-time agricultural operations. Since 1744, 50 ha of woodland in Horschbach's municipal area in the area of the Herrmannsberg has belonged to the Ortsteil of Hachenbach along with a further 10 ha right in the former municipal area. The forest is nowadays administered by the Lauterecken Forestry Office. The 216-hectare municipal area is very hilly in places and usable for agriculture only with some difficulty. This is even reflected in some rural cadastral names such as "Hagendornbusch" ("Hawthorn Bush"), "im Steinacker" ("in the Stone Field"), "in den Steinen" ("in the Stones") and "am Felsenrech" (the name refers to a cliff or crag). Among the few good plots of land are "Solch" and "Kappelfeld", which lie on the heath.

==== Niedereisenbach ====
This community's appearance is characterized by three roads: Bundesstraße 420, Landesstraße 373 and Kreisstraße 29. Formerly, the community's appearance was defined by the quarrying business. A manor house once belonging to the Barons of Kellenbach still exists as a ruin and is known from records to date back at least as far as 1629. The community core is formed by the 14th-century Saint Valentine’s Church (Valentinskirche). After the railway-building work in 1904, several representative sandstone buildings arose along Glantalstraße (Glan Valley Road). The shift from a farming village to a residential community with people in various occupations lasted until the 1960s; workers now commute to jobs in Kaiserslautern, Bad Kreuznach, Kirchheimbolanden and Ludwigshafen. Since 1990, there have no longer been any agricultural operations. The Niedereisenbach municipal area has only a few fertile cropfields and meadows. Besides the floodplains in the valley, the landscape is made up of slopes and stony heights, as reflected in some rural cadastral names such as "Auf dem Klöppchen" ("On the Little Knocks"), "Hungergraben" ("Hunger Pits"), "Rosskopf" ("Horse’s Head"), "Weisselstein" (perhaps "Whitewashed Stone") and "Rauweide" ("Raw Grazing Land"). Niedereisenbach owns 120 ha of woodland, part of which has arisen from coppicing former stands of tanning oak. It is administered by the Lauterecken Forestry Office.

== History ==
=== Hachenbach ===
==== Middle Ages ====
In 1150, Hachenbach had its first documentary mention in a document according to which Archbishop Heinrich of Mainz acknowledged the founding of a monastic cell in Offenbach by the freeman Reinfried von Rüdesheim. The original of this document is still on hand at the Departmental Archive in Metz. Hachenbach belonged then to the County of Veldenz in the Amt of Grumbach, whose seat was at Nerzweiler.

==== Modern times ====
In 1515, Hachenbach passed along with the other villages in the Eßweiler Tal (dale) into the lordship of the Waldgraves and Rhinegraves of Grumbach. In 1595, the Eßweiler Tal, and thereby Hachenbach too, then passed to the Duchy of Palatinate-Zweibrücken. Like many other villages in the region, Hachenbach, too, was utterly destroyed in 1677 in the Franco-Dutch War (1672-1678) by French King Louis XIV’s troops. Even though a 1755 agreement between Palatinate-Zweibrücken and the Rhinegraves of Grumbach resulted in the cession of five villages by the former back to the latter, Hachenbach remained with Zweibrücken and received a customs station at the bridge across the Glan, for Hachenbach had become a border village. This bridge, first built as a stone bridge in 1751/1752, was of special importance to the village. All postal and road traffic between Meisenheim and Zweibrücken went across this bridge in the area of the so-called Hohe Straße ("High Road"). The bridge had its first documentary mention in 1693, when it was newly built, although it was still only a wooden bridge then. The cost of this bridge, which was completed in May 1752 and which was thereby the earliest known crossing of the Glan, was 1,746 Gulden, two thirds of which (1,164 Gulden) was borne by the treasury of the Zweibrücken Oberamt of Lichtenberg, and the other third of which (582 Gulden) was borne by the administration of the Lordship of Kellenbach. In 1784, the bridge was heavily damaged in an ice run on the Glan, and thus Duke Carl II August of Zweibrücken saw to it in 1789 that a great two-storey-high and 70-foot-long (actually the old German measure called a Schuh, which literally means "shoe"; this was >20 m) wing wall was built onto the bridge on the Hachenbach (right) side, obliged as he felt to shield the bridge against any further such misfortunes. In 1794, the French military broke the arch nearest the Hachenbach side. Until 1825, a wooden emergency bridge was used, until the stone bridge could be set right again. As before, the cost was split at a ratio of 2:1, between the rightful heirs to the lordships on each side of the Glan, but the total this time was only 850 Gulden.

===== Recent times =====
In 1798, Hachenbach passed within the German lands on the Rhine’s left bank that had been annexed by France to the Department of Mont-Tonnerre (or Donnersberg in German), the Arrondissement of Kaiserslautern, the Canton of Lauterecken and the Mairie ("Mayoralty") of Hundheim. After the Congress of Vienna, the village passed in 1816 to the district (at first Landcommissariat and then Bezirksamt) of Kusel within the Kingdom of Bavaria. After the Second World War it passed to the then newly founded state of Rhineland-Palatinate. In the course of administrative restructuring in Rhineland-Palatinate in 1969, Hachenbach was merged with the neighbouring village of Niedereisenbach, which hitherto had belonged to the Birkenfeld district, to form the new municipality of Glanbrücken.

=== Niedereisenbach ===
==== Middle Ages ====
The earliest verifiable documentary mention, from 1246, is to be found in a not very accessible information book given to the Benedictine and Cistercian orders. In another document from 23 June 1336, in which Niedereisenbach is named as INFERIORI YSENBACH (nieder – cognate with the English word "nether" – in German and inferior in Latin both mean "lower"), Werner, the archpriest of Kusel, witnessed the building of the chapel consecrated to Saint Valentine at Eisenbach. In 1358, Clas von Kellenbach pledged the village of Eisenbach, which he held in fief, and the mill to Count Heinrich of Veldenz for the sum of 180 pounds in hellers. From the 13th century onwards, until French Revolutionary troops marched in during the French Revolution, Niedereisenbach always belonged to the Barons of Kellenbach, who as early as 1289 donated the Hirsauer Kirche to Saint Mary's Monastery of Offenbach.

==== Modern times ====
After the Thirty Years' War, Philipp Heinrich von Kellenbach lived with his family in Niedereisenbach. The manor house stood above the Hofpfad (nowadays a street, although the name means "Estate Path") near the Klink property. It no longer stands, but parts of the back wall with bits of a chimney can still be seen. Philipp Heinrich's son Johan Ludwig von Kellenbach, born in 1680 in Niedereisenbach, was Chief Estate Master and Master Hunter at Count Ludwig von Nassau-Saarbrücken-Ottweiler's estate in Ottweiler. In the Niedereisenbach church lie, supposedly, the baronial family's remains, although this can no longer be verified. After Johan Ludwig von Kellenbach's death on 21 September 1750, the house's heirs and the Duchy of Palatinate-Zweibrücken became embroiled in a years-long court case that ended with the estate being auctioned off. The mill was left out of this process, and was still owned by the Kellenbachs’ heirs until 1875.

===== Recent times =====
In 1798, Niedereisenbach was declared French territory and passed within the German lands on the Rhine's left bank that had been annexed by France to the Department of Sarre (whose seat was at Trier), the Arrondissement of Birkenfeld, the Canton of Grumbach and the Mairie ("Mayoralty") of Offenbach. In 1816, after the Congress of Vienna, Niedereisenbach passed to the Principality of Lichtenberg (whose capital was Sankt Wendel), a newly created exclave of the Duchy of Saxe-Coburg-Saalfeld, which as of 1826 became the Duchy of Saxe-Coburg and Gotha. As part of this state, it passed by sale in 1834 to the Kingdom of Prussia, which made this area into the Sankt Wendel district in the Regierungsbezirk of Trier, the Amt of Grumbach and the Rhine Province. Later, after the First World War, the Treaty of Versailles stipulated, among other things, that 26 of the Sankt Wendel district's 94 municipalities had to be ceded to the British- and French-occupied Saar. The remaining 68 municipalities then bore the designation "Restkreis St. Wendel-Baumholder", with the first syllable of Restkreis having the same meaning as in English, in the sense of "left over". Niedereisenbach belonged, as part of the Amt of Grumbach, to this district until 1937, when it was transferred to the newly formed Birkenfeld district. After the Second World War, in 1946, Niedereisenbach found itself in the then newly founded state of Rhineland-Palatinate. In the course of administrative restructuring in Rhineland-Palatinate in 1969, Niedereisenbach was merged with the neighbouring village of Hachenbach to form the new municipality of Glanbrücken; it was also transferred, this time to the Kusel district, in which it remains today. It also became part of the Verbandsgemeinde of Lauterecken, and until 2000, when it was dissolved, Glanbrücken also lay in the Regierungsbezirk of Rheinhessen-Pfalz, whose seat was at Neustadt an der Weinstraße.

=== Glanbrücken ===
On 7 June 1969, in the course of administrative restructuring in Rhineland-Palatinate, Hachenbach and Niedereisenbach (formerly in the Birkenfeld district) were merged to form the new municipality of Glanbrücken ("Glan Bridges") in the Kusel district.

=== Population development ===
==== Hachenbach ====
From the time when the village was first settled until the 16th century, no Hachenbach inhabitants’ names are known. The first known names appeared in a 1542 taxation roll from the Waldgraviate-Rhinegraviate of the Eßweiler Tal. Written there are ten names, likely householders’. A 1586 building directory names 14 Rauchhaber (literally "smoke havers", that is, people who have a hearth, and therefore a household) who had to pay contributions in kind. It can be assumed that in 1609, some 80 or 90 people lived in Hachenbach. A 1743 document is the oldest full directory of inhabitants that is still preserved. There were then 87 souls and 20 hearths in Hachenbach. Of the 307 inhabitants in Hachenbach in 1998, 30% were more than 70 years old.

The following table shows population development over the centuries for Hachenbach, with some figures broken down by religious denomination:

Year	1825	1835	1871	1905	1939	1961
Total	163	220	240	227	203	203
Catholic	13					12
Evangelical	150					191

==== Niedereisenbach ====
Anyone who wanted to settle in Niedereisenbach back in feudal times became a serf of the Barons of Kellenbach. As in Hachenbach, no Niedereisenbach inhabitants’ names are known either, from any time between the village's founding and the Middle Ages. The oldest document that names anyone, one from 1508, deals with the Kellenbacher Mühle (mill). Therein are named the mill's owner, Clas von Kellenbach, and a miller, presumably a journeyman, Peter, from Welchweiler. Before the Thirty Years' War, supposedly some 90 inhabitants were already living in Eisenbach (as it was customarily called at one time). In 1815, it was 208, and in 1860, it was 275. In 1900, the village had 298 inhabitants, and a peak was reached in 1925 when there were 431 inhabitants. In 1998, there were 378 people living in the community, of whom 20% were older than 60.

The following table shows population development over the centuries for Niedereisenbach:

Year	1815	1860	1900	1925	1958
Total	208	275	298	431	415

=== Municipality’s names ===
==== Hachenbach ====
The name Hachenbach is made up of the common placename ending —bach ("brook" in German) prefixed to which is the name Hacho, which is witnessed in documents many times in the time between 800 and 1050 as an old German given name and a forester's name. The name's current form appeared as early as the 1150 first documentary mention. Other forms of the name that the village (now constituent community) has borne over the ages are Hachinbach and Hachmach (14th century), Oberhachenbach and Niederhachenbach, even Glan-Hachenbach to distinguish it from otherwise like-named places (Sienhachenbach, Schmidthachenbach – each originally likewise hyphenated).

==== Niedereisenbach ====
The name Niedereisenbach is made up of the common placename ending —bach, as with Hachenbach, prefixed to which is the word Isen, which unlike many local defining prefixes refers not to a personal name, but rather to the Middle High German word Isen, meaning "iron" (Modern High German: Eisen) or "ore", or even just generally, "metal". The further prefix Nieder—, which is cognate with the English word "nether", and bears the same meaning, distinguishes it from Obereisenbach, today a constituent community of Sankt Julian, which lies upstream. The village was first named in a 1246 document from the Benedictine order, whose content was reproduced in an 18th-century copy, as Isenbach. Other forms of the name that the village (now constituent community) has borne over the ages are, among others, Inferiori Ysenbach (1336), Niedereyßenbach (1336) and Eißenbach (1605).

==== Glanbrücken ====
The name Glanbrücken, meaning "Glan Bridges", is a modern coinage dating from the 1960s, although it is modelled on traditional placenames such as Saarbrücken, and like that name, it is the local river's name combined with the ending —brücken.

== Religion ==
=== Hachenbach ===
From the time of its first documentary mention, Hachenbach belonged ecclesiastically, along with the other villages in the area, to the parish of Hirsau. Hirsau was the church seat of the Diocese of Mainz and mother church of the political entity known as the Amt of Eßweiler Tal, which in 1609, with the exception of Eßweiler itself, still kept its graveyard in Hirsau. Hachenbach first had its own graveyard in 1843 in the cadastral area known as "Eichel" (whose name means "Acorn"). In 1623, Hachenbach passed to the parish of Hinzweiler, which at the time functioned as a branch of Hirsau. In 1820, it passed to the parish of Sankt Julian and has belonged thereto ever since. In 1998, the denominational breakdown was as follows: Evangelical 126; Catholic 27; no answer 5; none 10.

=== Niedereisenbach ===
From the Middle Ages onwards, Niedereisenbach belonged to the Church of Sankt Julian and then passed in 1805 to the parish of Offenbach. Niedereisenbach is an autonomous church community with its own presbytery. Besides the 283 Evangelical inhabitants (1998), 57 Roman Catholic inhabitants live in the community. There are fortnightly Evangelical church services, children's church services and youth church group meetings. Since 1954, there has been a women's auxiliary. The community's mixed choir participates in almost all church services at great festivals. The Catholic inhabitants belong to the church community of Sien and attend Mass at the Catholic church in Offenbach. For a while, there was a simultaneum at the church in Niedereisenbach, whereby both Protestants and Catholics could each use the church for their own services, although very often, this privilege was forbidden by the family Kellenbach. At the graveyard "at the steep track" (a translation of the cadastral name "An der Steige"), both denominations buried their dead beginning in 1889. Formerly, they were buried at the churchyard. Even today, Glanbrücken's two constituent communities are ecclesiastically separate, in both the Evangelical and Catholic churches: Niedereisenbach's Evangelicals belong to the Rhenish State Church (Rheinische Landeskirche) in Düsseldorf while its Catholics belong to the Roman Catholic Diocese of Trier; Hachenbach's Evangelicals belong to the Palatine State Church of Speyer (Pfälzische Landeskirche Speyer) while its Catholics belong to the Roman Catholic Diocese of Speyer. The church in Niedereisenbach had its first documentary mention in 1336. Parts of the current church building actually go back to this time. Judging from the east tower's shape, which is atypical for a Romanesque quire tower, it is likely that the belfry was only later built onto the quire, much like what was done at Hinzweiler. It could also be that the nave only got a ciborium for its altar sometime after 1500, along with a window from that time. There were renovations in 1754 and 1892. In 1964, a spiral staircase was built onto the quire tower, giving access to the belfry, which had now been converted into a sitting room. The church consists of a biaxial aisleless room, joined onto which to the northeast is a reduced, rib-vaulted rectangular quire. The subsequently reduced nave, whose west gable was renovated in 1754, has had work done on the gable side. The church's originally flat ceiling was replaced with the current stepped wooden ceiling in 1976-1978. The two columns separate two side rooms from the main hall. Remnants of baldachin ribs and uprights in the tracery window that went with the baldachin show that when the ciborium was built in the nave's southeast corner, this window, too, was renovated. The year 1521 that was formerly to be seen on the church might have had something to do with this work. The other two tracery windows were added in 1892. The nave and sanctuary are separated by a tall lancet arch standing on rectangular columns. The sanctuary, which has windows on all three sides, has retained the vaulting and tracery windows in their period shapes. Of the old furnishings, the lavabo and the sacramental niche are preserved. In 1998, the denominational breakdown in Niedereisenbach was as follows: Evangelical 283; Catholic 57; other 1; no answer 7; none 30.

== Politics ==
=== Municipal council ===
The council is made up of 8 council members, who were elected by majority vote at the municipal election held on 7 June 2009, and the honorary mayor as chairman.

=== Mayor ===
Glanbrücken's mayor is Guido Hablitz.

=== Coat of arms ===
The German blazon reads: Von Blau und Schwarz durch einen silbernen von links verlaufenden Wellenbalken geteilt. Oben ein goldener zunehmender Mond unter einer schwebenden goldenen Brücke, unten ein rotbezungter goldener Löwe.

The municipality's arms might in English heraldic language be described thus: A bend sinister wavy argent between azure in chief a bridge arched of three humetty and in dexter a moon increscent, both Or, and sable issuant from sinister base a demilion of the third armed and langued gules.

Before Hachenbach and Niedereisenbach were merged into the single municipality of Glanbrücken, each had its own coat of arms. Hachenbach's arms were azure a moon increscent Or (that is, a blue shield with the same gold moon charge now seen on the combined arms – including the face), while Niedereisenbach's arms were party per fess Or a church sinister gules and sable issuant from base a demilion of the first armed, langued and crowned gules. This is to say that the shield was divided horizontally, the upper half was gold and bore a single charge, namely a red church viewed from the side with the tower on the sinister (armsbearer's left, viewer's right) side. Meanwhile, the lower field was black with the same lion emerging from below, except that he was also wearing a red crown. No bridge charge appeared on either coat of arms, however.

== Culture and sightseeing ==
=== Buildings ===
The following are listed buildings or sites in Rhineland-Palatinate’s Directory of Cultural Monuments:

==== Hachenbach ====
- Bridge across the Glan – three-arched sandstone-block bridge with flood dykes, 1751/1752, architect Chief Builder Euler, Zweibrücken, high wing wall 1789

==== Niedereisenbach ====
- Evangelical church, Glanstraße 42 – mediaeval aisleless church with quire tower, 1336, marked 1521 (possibly a conversion), west gable renovated in 1754; in the graveyard a warriors’ memorial 1914-1918
- An den Mühlen 10, 11 – former Kellbachsche Mühle (baronial mill); first mentioned in 1358, divided in 1823; no. 10 former oilmill, expanded with a dwelling wing, right-angled commercial wing, wooden waterwheel; no. 11 two-and-a-half-floor mill building, 1863, technical equipment from the 1920s and 1950s; stable-barn with three-halled stable, 1869; characterizes village's appearance
- At Friedhofstraße 4 – double coat of arms of the Barons of Kellenbach, marked 1629; from the old manor house two former corbel stones
- Glantalstraße 7/9 – former railway station; block building, one-floor storage building with ramp, separate lavatory building, 1904; characterizes village's appearance
- Kirrweilerstraße 14 – Quereinhaus (a combination residential and commercial house divided for these two purposes down the middle, perpendicularly to the street) 1782, expansion 1786, stable-barn 1857

=== Regular events ===
The inhabitants of Glanbrücken have since 1992 been holding their kermis (church consecration festival, locally known as the Kerwe) jointly on the first weekend in August. This has gone a long way to uniting the two constituent communities of Hachenbach and Niedereisenbach. There are also festivals staged by the many clubs.

=== Clubs ===
The following clubs are active in Glanbrücken:

- Angelsportverein — angling club
- Förderverein der freiwilligen Feuerwehr Glanbrücken e.V. — fire brigade promotional association
- Freie Wählergruppe — Free Voters group
- Gesangverein — singing club
- Heimatverein — promotes local tradition
- Landfrauenverein — countrywomen's club
- Reservistenkameradschaft — club for reservists
- SPD-Ortsverein — SPD local organization
- Sportverein — sport club

Glanbrücken has a village community centre, a former schoolhouse with a clubhouse, a fairground, a fire station and a grilling pavilion.

== Economy and infrastructure ==
=== Economic structure ===
Of the four former mills in Glanbrücken, none is still running. Even into the 1960s, the agricultural structure was dominant, and farming was, but for the quarries and the few craft businesses, the only way to earn one's livelihood in these twin villages. Many workers earned a living at mining, but this was outside Glanbrücken, in the Saarland. After the railway was built in 1904, the local economy quickly saw an upswing. The Steinbruch-Aktiengesellschaft Köln (a quarrying company from Cologne) located down from the railway station and built a stately administration building. At the Deimberger Bruch (the quarry), the sought-after sandstone was hewn from the ground and worked on site. For a while, the yield reached 3 200 m^{2} yearly. Sixty quarrymen and 20 auxiliary workers worked at the quarry, which lay 3 km from the villages. Meanwhile, 120 stonemasons and 15 of their apprentices were kept busy at the workplace in Niedereisenbach. Today there are a few service-sector businesses, two inns, an automotive-electric business, a roofing business and a building material dealership that also deals in land. The municipality of Glanbrücken has grown into a mostly commuter-oriented, residential community.

=== Education ===
==== Hachenbach ====
The first schoolteacher who can be identified in Hachenbach's history was one named Klein, who presumably taught in a rented makeshift schoolroom. He also taught in the winter in Niedereisenbach. In 1829, the municipality decided to build a new schoolhouse. It had one classroom and a small teacher's dwelling with a sitting room, a bedroom and a kitchen. Already by the mid 19th century, the school had become too small. In 1863, work was begun to build another classroom onto the school, and expand the teacher's dwelling. The school, which subsequently underwent other alterations, was used until 1962, when the old village school was dissolved. A February 1962 decision joined Hachenbach to the Sankt Julian school association. The schoolchildren went there, to the newly built Mittelpunktschule ("midpoint school", a central school, designed to eliminate smaller outlying schools). Today, there is still a primary school in Sankt Julian. Older students attend the Hauptschule in Lauterecken or higher schools in Lauterecken and Kusel.

==== Niedereisenbach ====
Until 1822, the only school in Niedereisenbach was a winter school (a school geared towards an agricultural community's practical needs, held in the winter, when farm families had a bit more time to spare). There was no compulsory schooling, and there were many illiterates. It was only in that year that the Saxe-Coburg-Saalfeld government hired the schoolteacher Karl Schaun, from Sien. He had to hold school the year round and he was also the sexton. Winter school was held at the "Schneeberg’sches Haus" and summer school at the village hall. In 1833, Schaun, and the school along with him, moved into the then newly built schoolhouse (which has since become a private house). In 1834, the number of pupils was 60 to 65; Catholic schoolchildren went to Offenbach. In the mid 19th century, the number of pupils shrank to 45 or 50 after several families had emigrated to Brazil. In 1865, Schaun was succeeded in the local teaching post by Wilhelm Kullmann, who after Schaun's 43-year tenure only lasted three years, being followed in 1868 by a teacher named Bauer from Veldenz on the Moselle, who then died that same year. From 1869 to 1910, Jakob Hauch from Berglangenbach worked as schoolteacher. On the 50-year jubilee of his service, he was awarded the Prussian House Order, and the municipality gave him an upholstered red armchair as a gift. This armchair was later thrown out a second-floor window at the Werner property during the French occupation of the Rhineland. Classes were held at the village school, which was built in 1882, until 23 August 1967. The one-room school was then dissolved, and the pupils then attended the newly built Mittelpunktschule. Today, primary school pupils attend school in Sankt Julian, while Hauptschule students go to the requisite schools in Lauterecken. Higher schools can be found in Lauterecken and Kusel.

=== Transport ===
Running through the municipality are Bundesstraße 420 (Oppenheim-Neunkirchen) and Landesstraße 373 (Glanbrücken-Kappeln). Glanbrücken is linked to the neighbouring villages of Sankt Julian and Horschbach by Kreisstraßen. The double-tracked Glan Valley Railway (Glantalbahn), running, by way of Glanbrücken, between Bad Münster am Stein and Saarbrücken-Scheidt, built as a "strategic railway line", was closed on 31 May 1985, after 81 years and one month in service. Lauterecken-Grumbach station still operates on the Lauter Valley Railway (Lautertalbahn).

== Famous people ==
=== Sons and daughters of the town ===
- Ludwig Mahler (b. 1896 in Hachenbach; d. 1968) — Chief Inspector in the government, compiler of the 1966 Hachenbach village chronicle.
- Johan Ludwig von Kellenbach (b. 1680 in Eisenbach; d. 1750 in Ottweiler) — Chief Estate Master and Master Hunter at Count Ludwig von Nassau-Saarbrücken-Ottweiler's estate in Ottweiler
