= Alsenz-Obermoschel =

Coordinates: 49°43′51″N 7°48′50″E

Alsenz-Obermoschel is a former Verbandsgemeinde ("collective municipality") in the Donnersbergkreis, in Rhineland-Palatinate, Germany. On 1 January 2020 it was merged into the new Verbandsgemeinde Nordpfälzer Land. It was situated on the river Alsenz, approx. 15 km south of Bad Kreuznach, and 30 km north of Kaiserslautern. The seat of the municipality was in Alsenz.

== Local municipalities ==
The Verbandsgemeinde Alsenz-Obermoschel consisted of the following Ortsgemeinden ("local municipalities"):

1. Alsenz
2. Finkenbach-Gersweiler
3. Gaugrehweiler
4. Kalkofen
5. Mannweiler-Cölln
6. Münsterappel
7. Niederhausen an der Appel
8. Niedermoschel
9. Oberhausen an der Appel
10. Obermoschel
11. Oberndorf
12. Schiersfeld
13. Sitters
14. Unkenbach
15. Waldgrehweiler
16. Winterborn
