= Rockenhausen (Verbandsgemeinde) =

Municipality in Rhineland-Palatinate, Germany

Coordinates: 49.629°N 7.821°E

Rockenhausen is a former Verbandsgemeinde ("collective municipality") in the Donnersbergkreis, in Rhineland-Palatinate, Germany. The seat of the Verbandsgemeinde was in Rockenhausen. On 1 January 2020 it was merged into the new Verbandsgemeinde Nordpfälzer Land.

The Verbandsgemeinde Rockenhausen consisted of the following Ortsgemeinden ("local municipalities"):

1. Bayerfeld-Steckweiler
2. Bisterschied
3. Dielkirchen
4. Dörrmoschel
5. Gehrweiler
6. Gerbach
7. Gundersweiler
8. Imsweiler
9. Katzenbach
10. Ransweiler
11. Rathskirchen
12. Reichsthal
13. Rockenhausen
14. Ruppertsecken
15. Sankt Alban
16. Schönborn
17. Seelen
18. Stahlberg
19. Teschenmoschel
20. Würzweiler
