= Obermoschel =

- Town
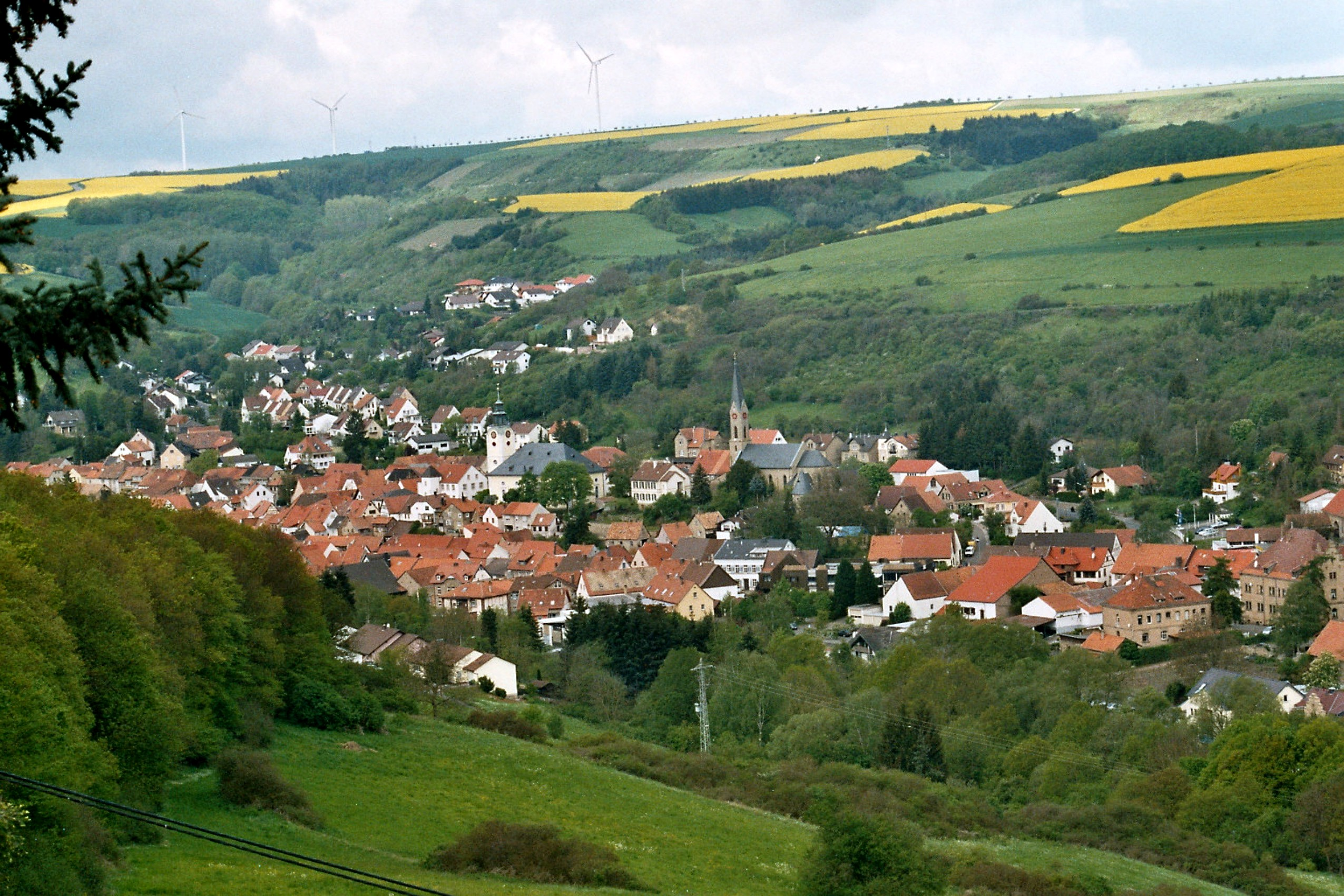
- View from Moschellandsburg Castle

- Coat of arms

- Location of Obermoschel within Donnersbergkreis district
- Interactive map of Obermoschel
- Location within Germany Location within Rhineland-Palatinate
- Coordinates: 49°43′37″N 07°46′22″E
- Country: Germany
- State: Rhineland-Palatinate
- District: Donnersbergkreis
- Municipal assoc.: Nordpfälzer Land

Government
  - Mayor (2019–24): Ralf Beisiegel

Area
  - Total: 10.15 km^{2} (3.92 sq mi)
- Elevation: 206 m (676 ft)

Population (2025-12-31)
  - Total: 1,077
  - Density: 106.1/km^{2} (274.8/sq mi)
- Time zone: UTC+01:00 (CET)
  - Summer (DST): UTC+02:00 (CEST)
- Postal codes: 67823
- Dialling codes: 06362
- Vehicle registration: KIB
- Website: www.obermoschel.de

Obermoschel (German pronunciation: [oːbɐˈmɔʃl̩], lit. 'Upper Moschel', in contrast to "Lower Moschel") is a town and municipality in the district Donnersbergkreis, Rhineland-Palatinate, Germany. With around 1,000 residents, it is the smallest town in the Palatinate (Pfalz). It is part of the Verbandsgemeinde ("collective municipality") Nordpfälzer Land, which has its seat of administration in community of Rockenhausen and an administrative office in Alsenz. According to regional planning, Obermoschel is designated as lower-order center (Grundzentrum).

== Geography ==
=== Location ===
Obermoschel is a town in the district Donnersbergkreis, Rhineland-Palatinate, Germany. It is part of the Verbandsgemeinde ("collective municipality") Nordpfälzer Land. It is situated 15 km southwest of Bad Kreuznach. Obermoschel lies in the North Palatinate Hills between Bad Kreuznach to the north-east, Rockenhausen to the south-east and Bad Sobernheim the north-west. Additionally, the settlement areas of the Kahlforsterhof and the restaurant Waldhaus belong to Obermoschel. Bordering communities include, in clockwise reference, Hallgarten, Niedermoschel, Sitters, Unkenbach, Lettweiler and Duchroth. An additional neighboring community is Schiersfeld laying to the south.

=== Elevation ===
The city is surrounded by four mountains: Steinhübel, Selberg, Moschellandsberg (also known as the Landsberg or Schloßberg) and the Kahlforster Höhe.

=== Bodies of water ===
The river Moschel flows through the city in a west-east direction. In the following order, these waterways flow from the left side into the Moschel River within Obermoschel: the Unkenbach, the Windbach, the Sauerborngraben and the Katzbach.

=== Geology ===
The minerals skutterudite, nickelskutterudite and violarite can be found locally.

== History ==
=== The Middle Ages and early New Age ===
In the Middle Ages Obermoschel and the Landsberg Castle ("Landsburg") belonged to the Counts of Valdenz (see County of Veldenz), which were obtained as a fiefdom from the Bishopric of Worms. The Counts of Valdenz presumably had inherited this fiefdom in the early 12th century from their ancestors, the Emichones. One location, "Moschel", was mentioned first in the year 1112. This mentioning supposedly refers to Niedermoschel and not "Obermoschel" like many believe. On 7 September 1349 Obermoschel received the elevated status of city by Charles IV, Holy Roman Emperor and also received market rights.

After the hereditary line of the Counts of Veldenz died out, Obermoschel and the Landsberg Castle were transferred to the County Palatine of Zweibrücken (Palatine Zweibrücken) in the year 1444 and remained in its possession until the end of the 18th century. During this time, the City of Obermoschel was answerable to the Oberamt Meisenheim ("Superior Bailiwick of Meisenheim" (Zweibrücken)) and the Amt Landsberg (Landsberg Department).

=== Since 1800 ===
From 1798 to 1814, as the Palatinate (region) was part of the French First Republic (until 1804) and part of the First French Empire, Obermoschel was part of the French Department Mont-Tonnerre and the seat of the same-named canton and Mairie, which additionally encompassed five further communities. In 1815 Obermoschel had 794 residents and in the same year, Austria attacked the city. Subsequently the city came under the control of the Kingdom of Bavaria. From 1818 to 1862 the Waldfischbach was a part of the Landkommissariat Kirchheim ("Kirchheim State Commissioner's Office"), which subsequently was converted into a Bezirksamt ("district office"). In Obermoschel in June 1849, Victor Schily organized the first battalion of the Pfälzer Volkswehr ("the People's Defense Force of the Palatine").

On 1 December 1900, jurisdiction of Obermoschel fell to the newly created Bezirksamt ("District Office") Rockenhausen. Starting in 1939, the city was part of the Landkreis ("administrative district") Rockenhausen. In 1943 the silver-mercury ore moschellandsbergite (formerly hard silver), known from the Middle Ages, was named and recognized after its place of discovery, Moschellandsberg. In 1984 an unknown mineral was found in the oven pits at the Moschellandsberg and in 1985 it was recognized by the International Mineralogical Association as a moschelite.

After the Second World War, Obermoschel became part of the then newly formed state of Rhineland-Palatinate within the French occupation zone in Germany. In the course of the first administrative reform in Rhineland-Palatinate, the city changed to the newly formed Donnersbergkreis in 1969; three years later, Obermoschel was incorporated into the newly created community of Alsenz-Obermoschel. On January 1, 2020, the city moved to the newly created Verbandsgemeinde Nordpfälzer Land.

== Religion ==
The Catholics belong to the Roman Catholic Diocese of Speyer and are subordinate to the Donnersberg deanery, and the Evangelicals belong to the Evangelical Church of the Palatinate. Only during the French period from 1802 to 1817 did Obermoschel belong to the Roman Catholic Diocese of Mainz. The city is the seat of a Protestant deanery.

The portal stones of the synagogue built in 1844 and destroyed in 1938 are exhibited on the church square. On October 22, 1940, the Jews living in Obermoschel were deported as part of the Wagner-Bürckel campaign.
