= Bayerfeld-Steckweiler =

- Municipality
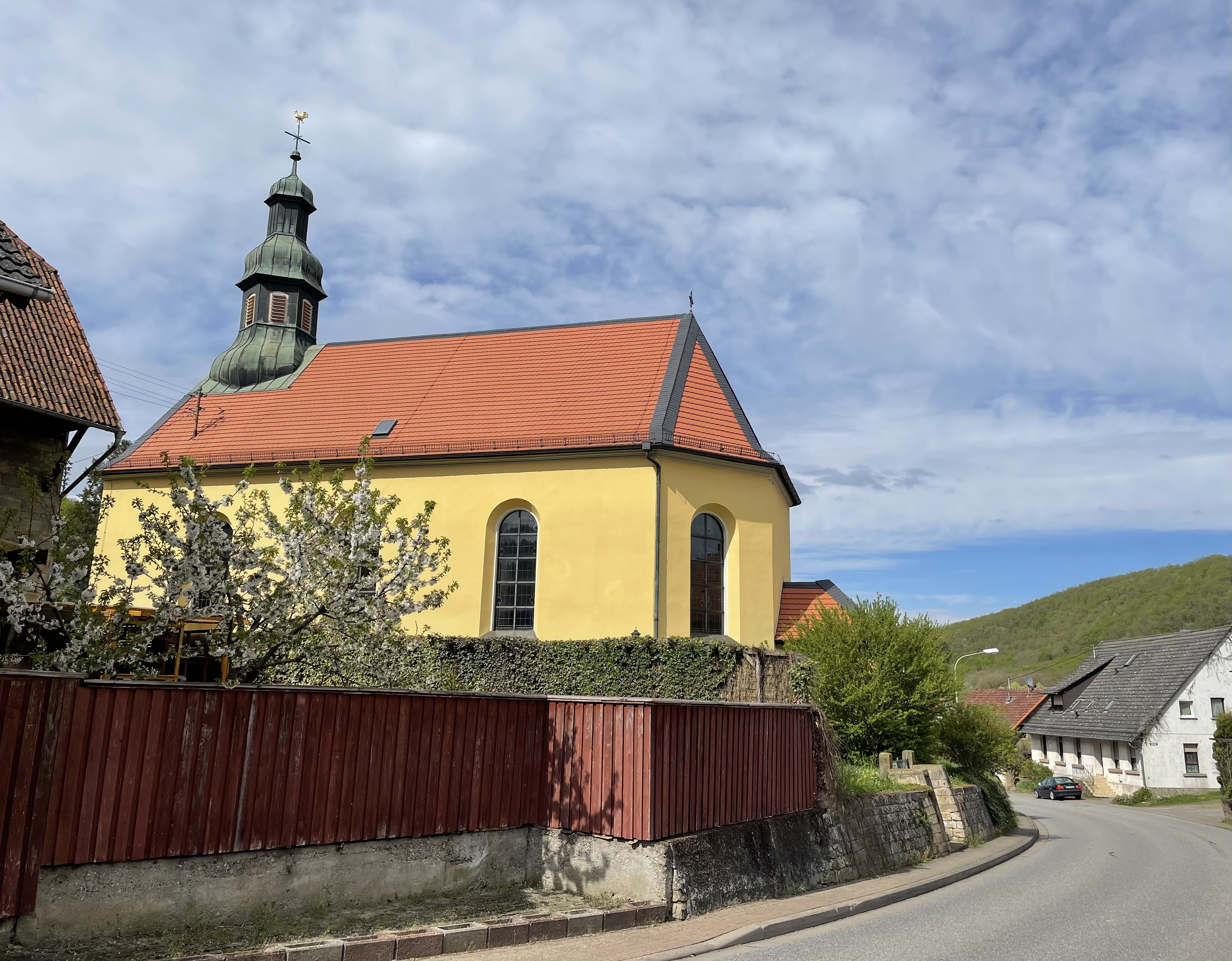
- St. Joseph's catholic church in Bayerfeld

- Coat of arms

- Location of Bayerfeld-Steckweiler within Donnersbergkreis district
- Interactive map of Bayerfeld-Steckweiler
- Location within Germany Location within Rhineland-Palatinate
- Coordinates: 49°40′43″N 7°47′51.79″E
- Country: Germany
- State: Rhineland-Palatinate
- District: Donnersbergkreis
- Municipal assoc.: Nordpfälzer Land

Government
  - Mayor (2024–29): Fritz Müller

Area
  - Total: 8.60 km^{2} (3.32 sq mi)
- Elevation: 185 m (607 ft)

Population (2025-12-31)
  - Total: 393
  - Density: 45.7/km^{2} (118/sq mi)
- Time zone: UTC+01:00 (CET)
  - Summer (DST): UTC+02:00 (CEST)
- Postal codes: 67808
- Dialling codes: 06362
- Vehicle registration: KIB

Bayerfeld-Steckweiler is a municipality in the Donnersbergkreis district, in Rhineland-Palatinate, Germany.

== Geography ==
Bayerfeld-Steckweiler is located upon the Alsenz river in the North Palatine Uplands between Kaiserslautern and Bad Kreuznach.

The municipality consists of the two villages of Bayerfeld and Steckweiler, as well as the three hamlets of Bremricherhof, Schmalfelderhof and Stolzenbergerhof and a part of Neubau settlement (shared with Stahlberg and Ransweiler).

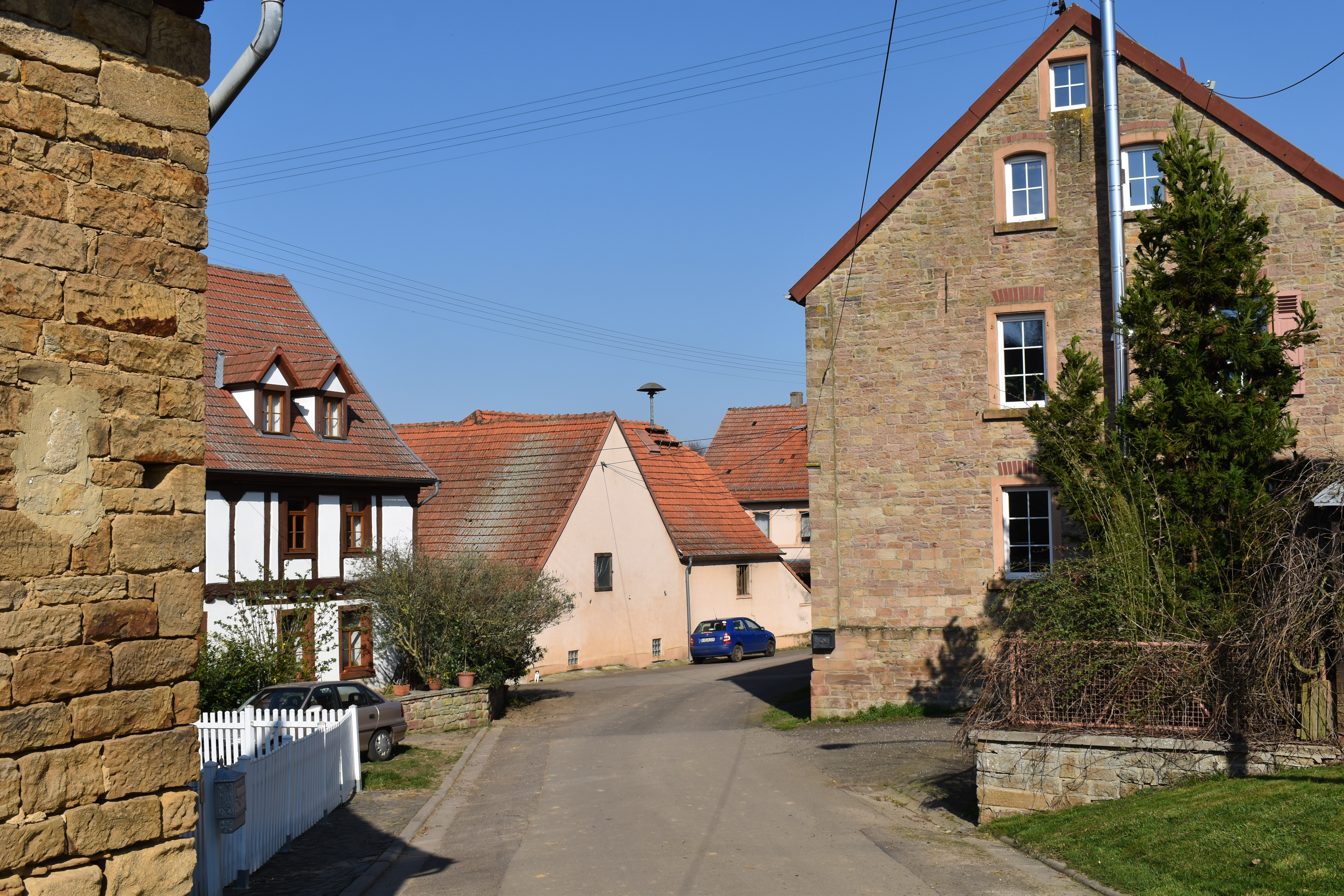
Bremricherhof

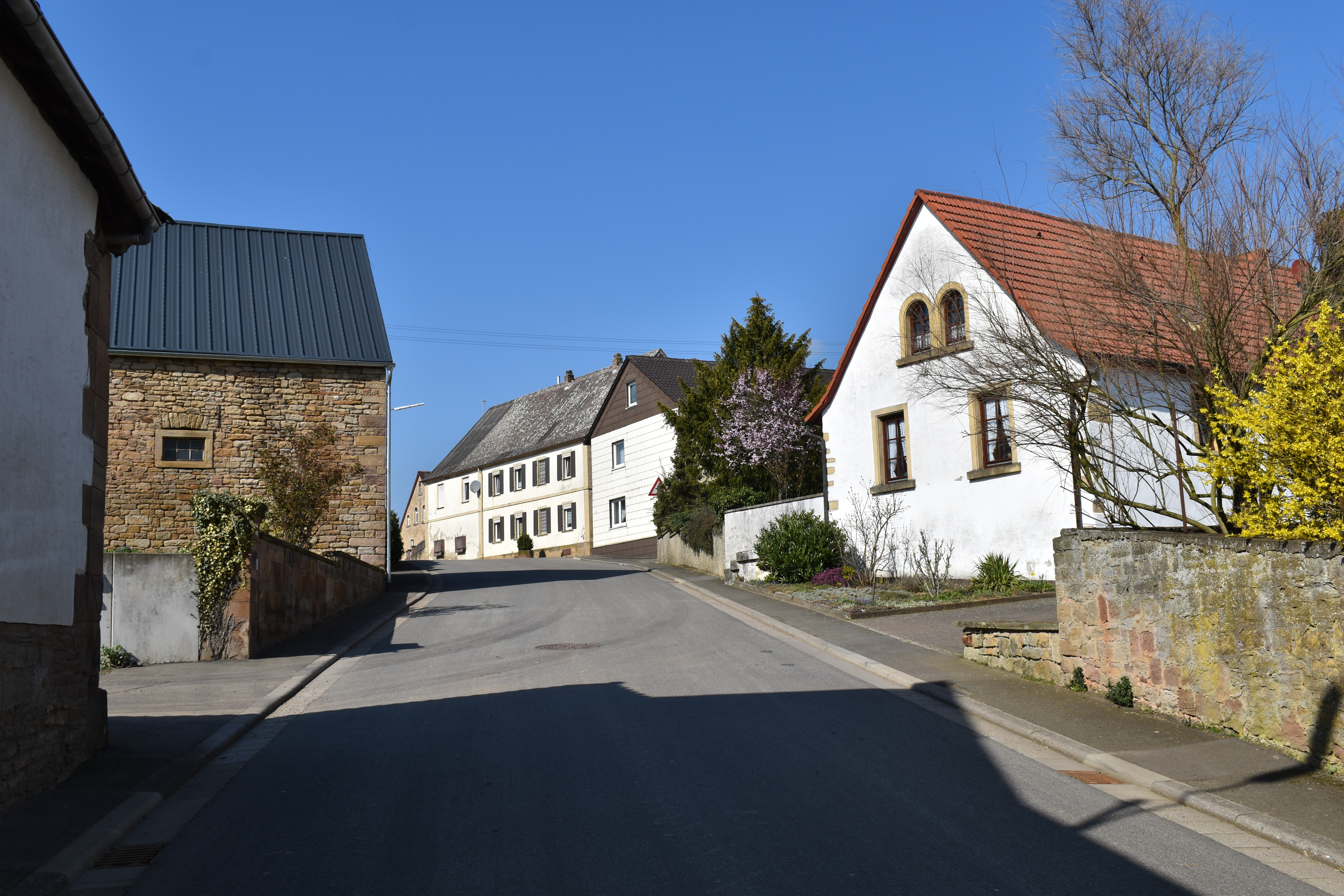
Schmalfelderhof

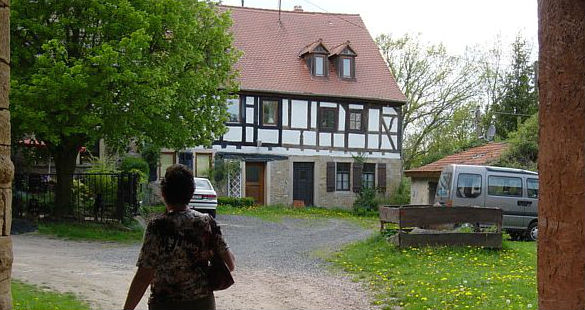
Stolzenbergerhof

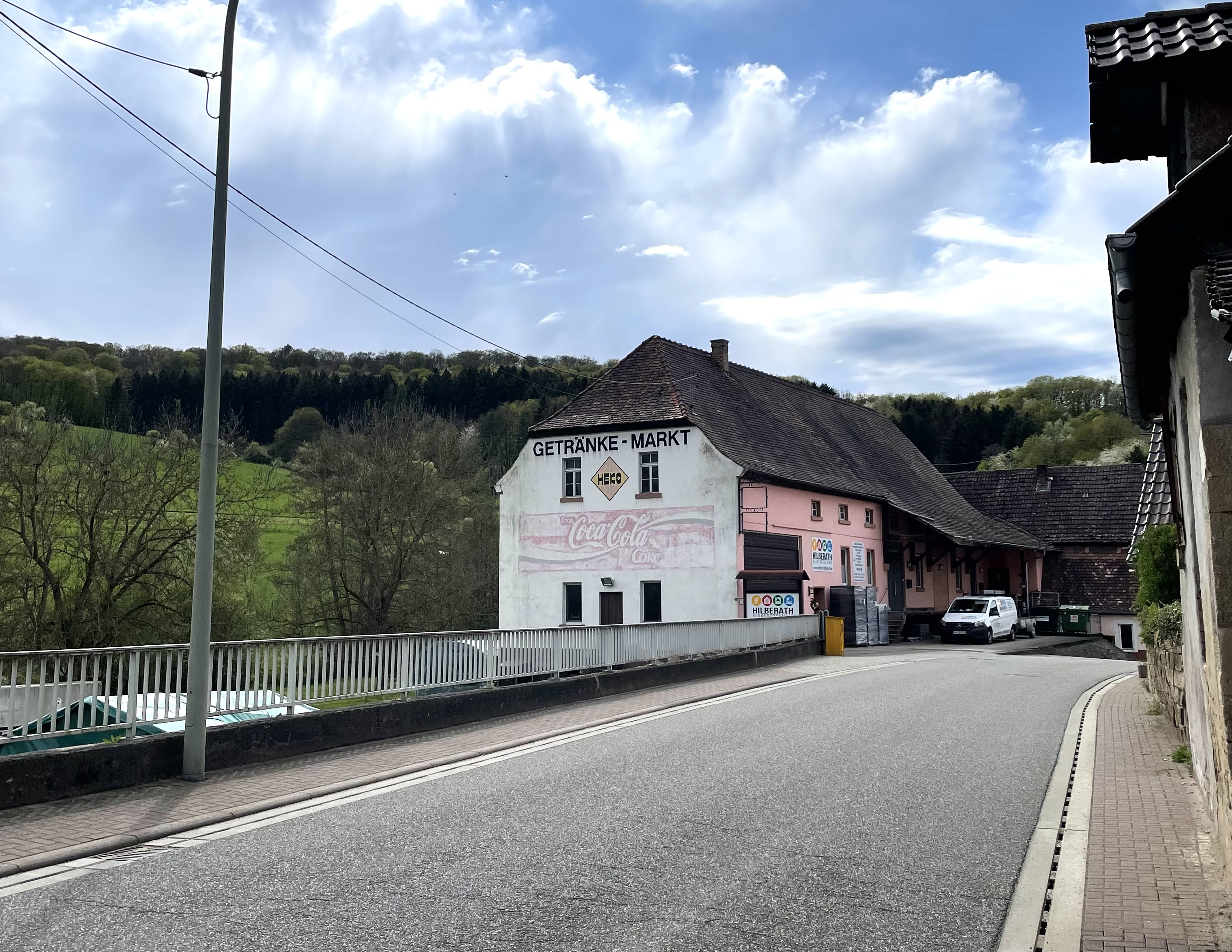
Steckweiler

Neighbouring municipalities are Alsenz, Gaugrehweiler, St. Alban, Dielkirchen, Stahlberg, Ransweiler, Schiersfeld, Mannweiler-Cölln and Oberndorf.

== History ==
During the Middle Ages Bayerfeld and Steckweiler were part of the Dominion of Stolzenberg which was centered around nearby Stolzenburg castle. The dominion was shared property of the Counts of Falkenstein and the Dukes of Palatine-Zweibrücken until the latter gained full control. In 1782 the villages became part of Further Austria and were administered from Winnweiler.

After the War of the First Coalition Bayerfeld und Steckweiler was occupied and later annexed by France with the Treaty of Campo Formio in 1797. From 1798 to 1814 it belonged to the French Departement du Mont-Tonnerre. After the Congress of Vienna the region was first given to Austria (1815) and later to Bavaria (1816).

After World War II Bayerfeld-Steckweiler became part of Rhineland-Palatinate (1946). Since 1969 it belongs to the Donnersbergkreis district.

== Culture and sights ==
=== Buildings ===
There are 9 protected buildings within the municipality. One of which is the Catholic church of Saint Joseph, built in 1767.

The ruins of Stolzenburg castle can be found in the district.

=== Nature ===
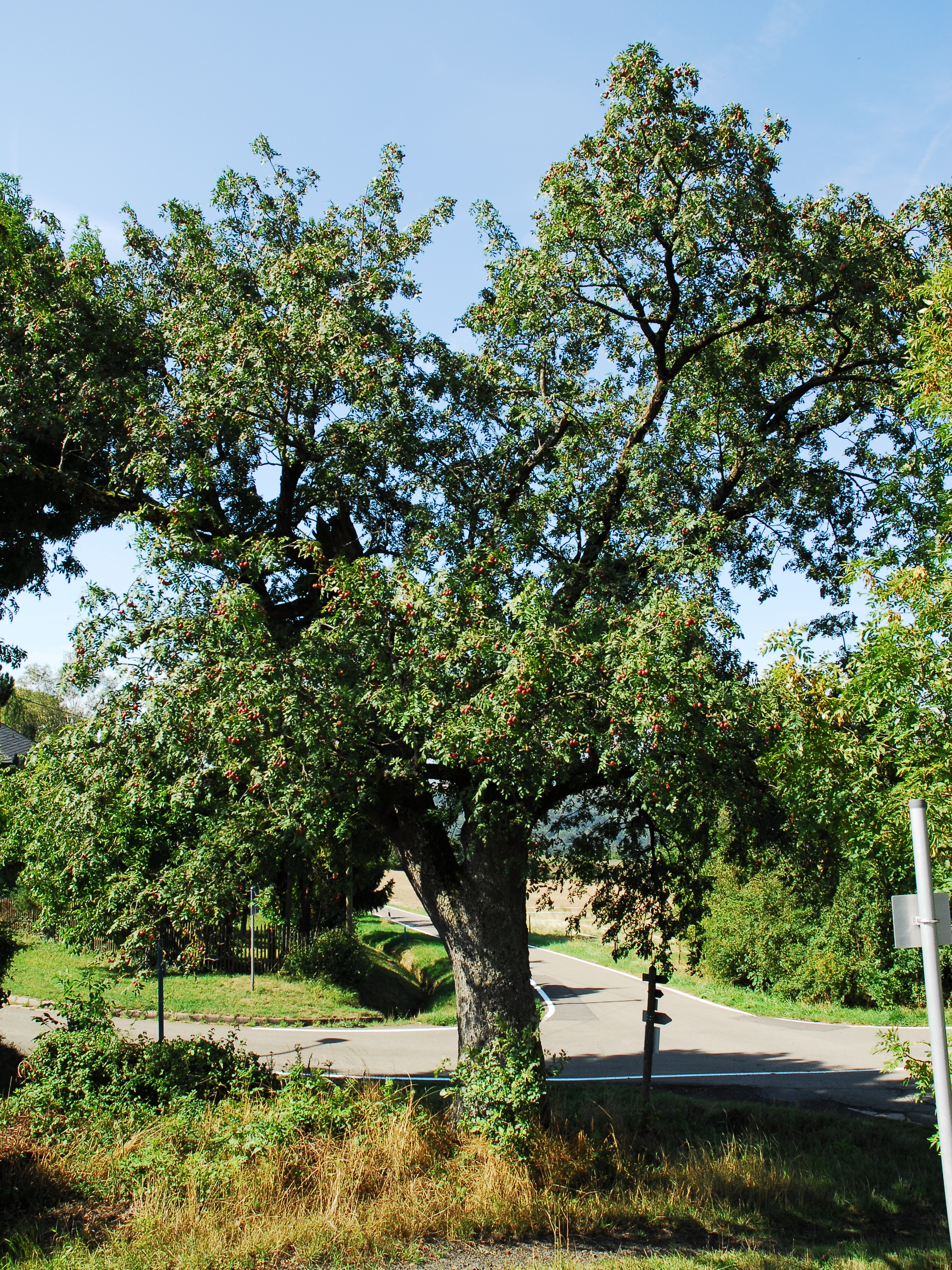
service tree near Stolzenbergerhof

Stolzenberg nature reserve is located above the village. Within it there is a protected service tree.

== Economy ==
=== Viticulture ===
Wine has been growing on the slopes of the Alsenz Valley for centuries. The dominating variety along the steep hillsides are white wine grapes. The few still producing farmers are part of the Nahe wine region.

=== Tourism ===
The Alsenz bike trail runs through Bayerfeld-Steckweiler, as well as the Palatine Ridgeway.

== Infrastructure ==
=== Road ===
B48 federal road runs through the villages. The A63 highway can be reached via Winnweiler, 20 km (12.5 mi) south. The outlying hamlet of Stolzenbergerhof can only be reached by a minor road via Cölln since the section to Steckweiler was damaged in 1982.

=== Rail ===
There was once a station called Bayerfeld-Cölln along the Alsenz Valley Railway. It was closed after World War II due to low passenger numbers. It was located in the district of neighbouring Mannweiler-Cölln. Today the nearest regularly served stations are now in Alsenz and Rockenhausen.

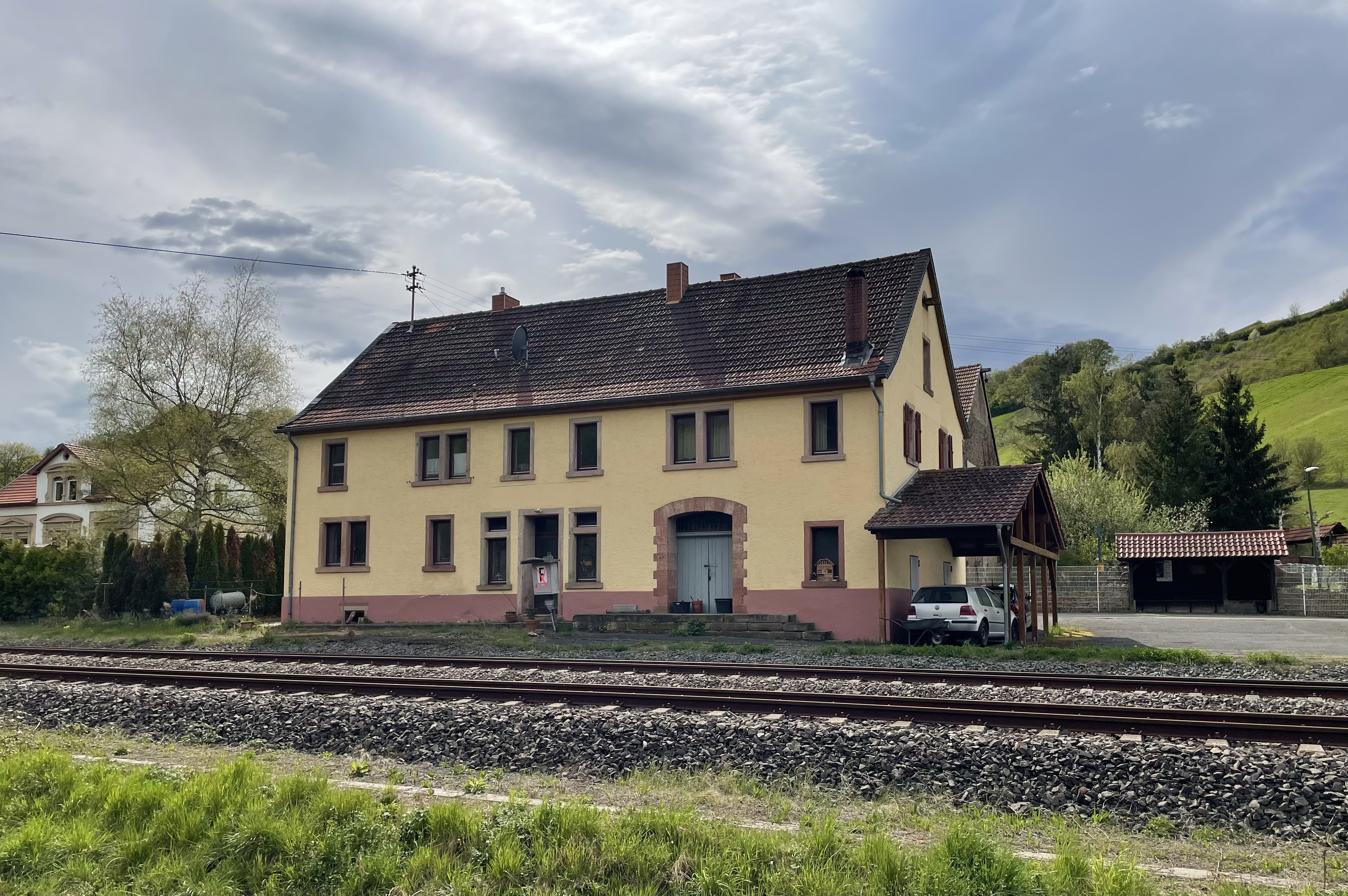
Bayerfeld-Cölln station
