= Kalkofen =

- Municipality
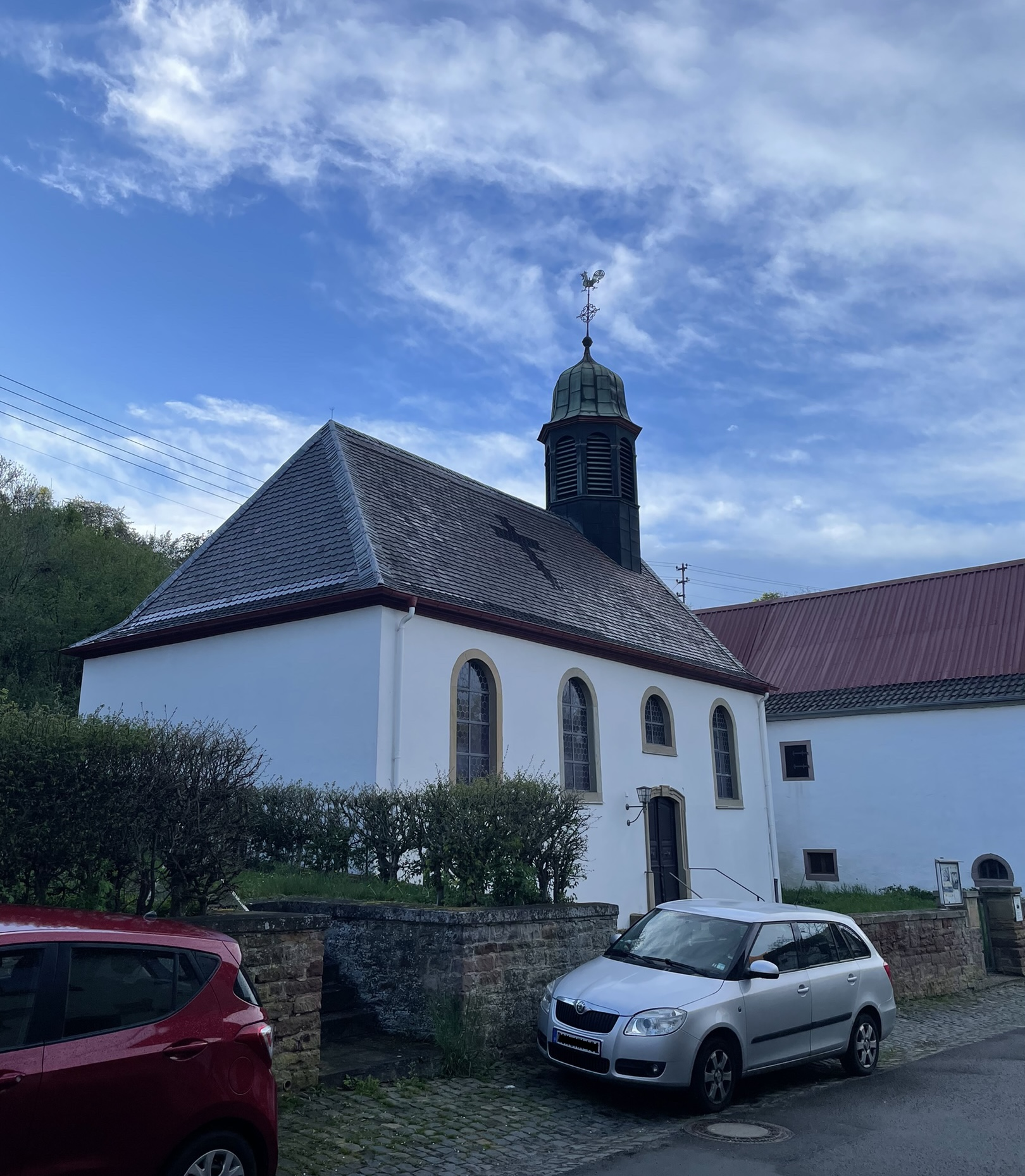
- protestant church

- Coat of arms

- Location of Kalkofen within Donnersbergkreis district
- Interactive map of Kalkofen
- Location within Germany Location within Rhineland-Palatinate
- Coordinates: 49°43′59″N 7°50′08″E
- Country: Germany
- State: Rhineland-Palatinate
- District: Donnersbergkreis
- Municipal assoc.: Nordpfälzer Land

Government
  - Mayor (2021–24): Christoph Küsters

Area
  - Total: 1.83 km^{2} (0.71 sq mi)
- Elevation: 311 m (1,020 ft)

Population (2025-12-31)
  - Total: 163
  - Density: 89.1/km^{2} (231/sq mi)
- Time zone: UTC+01:00 (CET)
  - Summer (DST): UTC+02:00 (CEST)
- Postal codes: 67822
- Dialling codes: 06362
- Vehicle registration: KIB

Kalkofen (literally translated: "lime kiln") is a municipality in the Donnersbergkreis district, in Rhineland-Palatinate, Germany.

== Geography ==
The village is situated in the valley of the Ohlbach stream. The nearest larger cities are Bad Kreuznach and Kaiserslautern. Neighbouring municipalities are Münsterappel, Winterborn and Alsenz.

== History ==
Kalkofen was first mentioned in a document in 1365.

== Politics ==
=== Heraldry ===
The coat of arms shows a lime kiln, referencing the village‘s name, and an argent wheel on azur.

== Economy and infrastructure ==
In 1960 there were 40 farms in the village, which employed 60% of the village‘s population. Today most residents commute to work.

Highways A61 and A63 run east of Kalkofen.

The three bus stops of the village are served by line 914 of the VRN.
