= Oberndorf, Rhineland-Palatinate =

Oberndorf
- Municipality
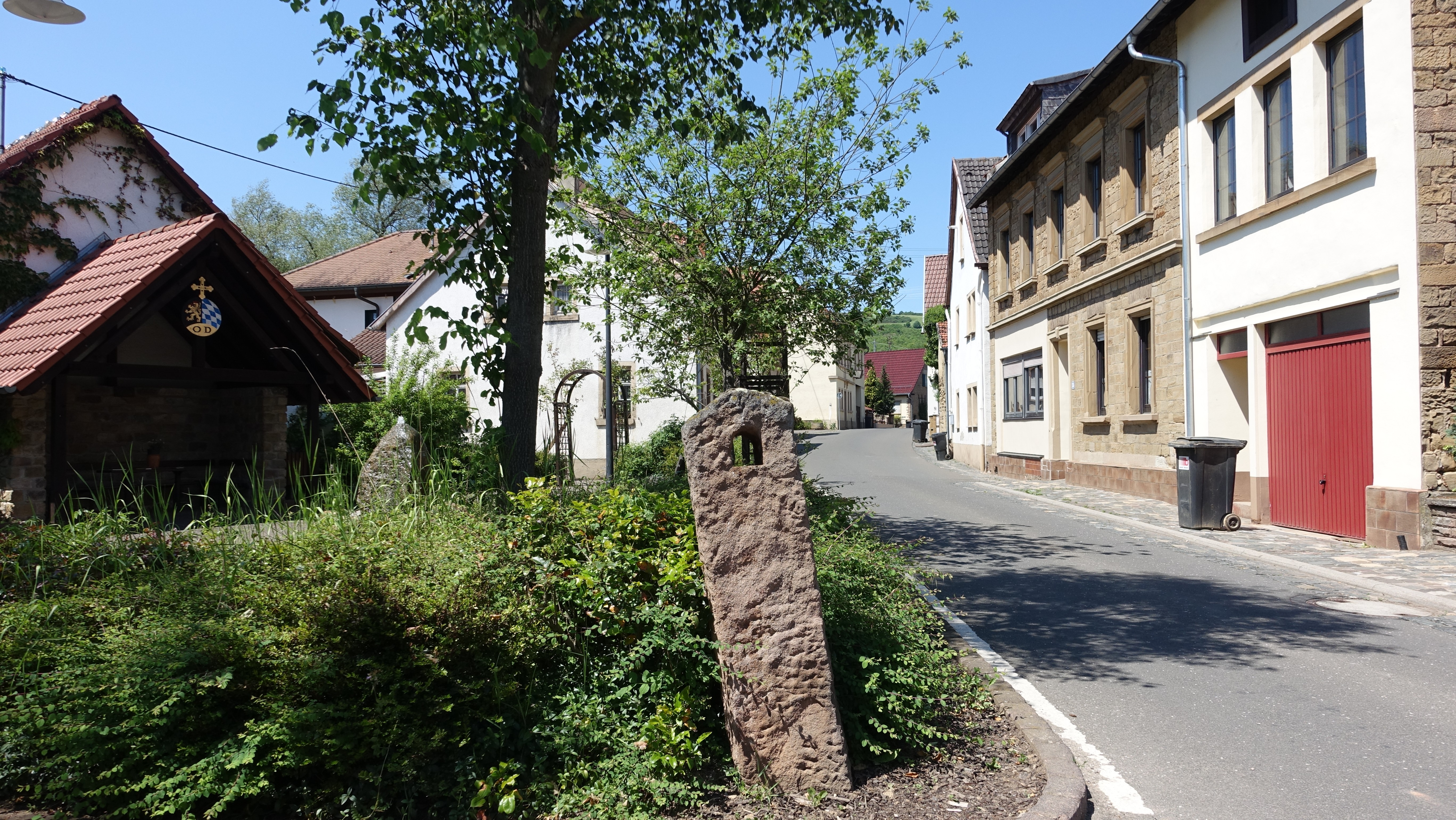
- village center and fountain

- Coat of arms

- Location of Oberndorf within Donnersbergkreis district
- Interactive map of Oberndorf
- Location within Germany Location within Rhineland-Palatinate
- Coordinates: 49°42′31.91″N 7°48′35.15″E
- Country: Germany
- State: Rhineland-Palatinate
- District: Donnersbergkreis
- Municipal assoc.: Nordpfälzer Land

Government
  - Mayor (2019–24): Claudia Linn

Area
  - Total: 2.8 km^{2} (1.1 sq mi)
- Elevation: 170 m (560 ft)

Population (2025-12-31)
  - Total: 246
  - Density: 88/km^{2} (230/sq mi)
- Time zone: UTC+01:00 (CET)
  - Summer (DST): UTC+02:00 (CEST)
- Postal codes: 67821
- Dialling codes: 06362
- Vehicle registration: KIB

Oberndorf (German: [ˈoːbɐndɔʁf]) is a municipality in the Donnersbergkreis district, in Rhineland-Palatinate, Germany.

== Geography ==
The village is located upon the Alsenz river in the North Palatine Uplands. Aspenberg hill is situated in the western part of Oberndorf‘s district. The inhabited place Lindenhof also belongs to the municipality.

Neighbouring municipalities are Alsenz, Mannweiler-Cölln and Bayerfeld-Steckweiler.

== History ==
The first document mentioning Oberndorf is dated to 1128. An earlier mention of an "Upper Village" (German: Oberes Dorf) connected to Alsenz is dated to 775. The village was part of the Electoral Palatinate until the late 18th century.

After the War of the First Coalition Oberndorf was occupied and later annexed by France with the Treaty of Campo Formio in 1797. From 1798 to 1814 it belonged to the French Departement du Mont-Tonnerre. After the Congress of Vienna the region was first given to Austria (1815) and later to Bavaria (1816). In 1815 the village had 290 residents.

After World War II Oberndorf became part of Rhineland-Palatinate (1946). Since 1969 it belongs to the Donnersbergkreis district.

== Religion ==
In the first half of the 20th century both denominations had their own respective parish.

== Politics ==
=== Mayor ===
Claudia Linn has been the mayor of Oberndorf since 2019. She succeeded Karl Ludwig Bernhard.

=== Heraldry ===
The coat of arms shows a Globus cruciger with a cross. It is made up of a Palatine Lion, azur and argent lozenges and the letter O and D.

== Culture and sights ==
The village center is a protected architectural ensemble. Further there are 8 protected individual buildings, including St. Valentine‘s Church. The church is used by Catholics and Protestants alike (Simultaneum) and is the defining landmark of Oberndorf.

== Economy and infrastructure ==
=== Economy ===
Since 1971 Oberndorf is part of the Nahe wine region despite its location in the Palatinate. A windfarm (Windpark Oberndorf) was built from 2013 to 2015.

=== Transport ===
B48 federal road (Bingen am Rhein - Bad Bergzabern) runs west of Oberndorf. The village itself is connected to its neighbours by minor roads. A63 highway runs 24 km (15 mi) to the South.

Bus line 908 (Rockenhausen - Alsenz) of the VRN serves the village. Although it is located right next to its tracks, Oberndorf never had a station along the Alsenz Valley Railway due to its small population.

== People ==
- Karl Barwick (1883–1965), classical philologist
- Johannes Kreiselmaier (1892–1944), doctor, resistance fighter and NS-victim
