= Gundersweiler =

- Municipality
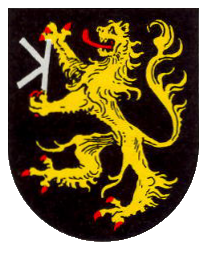
- Coat of arms

- Location of Gundersweiler within Donnersbergkreis district
- Interactive map of Gundersweiler
- Location within Germany Location within Rhineland-Palatinate
- Coordinates: 49°35′40″N 7°47′07″E
- Country: Germany
- State: Rhineland-Palatinate
- District: Donnersbergkreis
- Municipal assoc.: Nordpfälzer Land

Government
  - Mayor (2019–24): Helmut Klein

Area
  - Total: 10.44 km^{2} (4.03 sq mi)
- Elevation: 231 m (758 ft)

Population (2025-12-31)
  - Total: 510
  - Density: 49/km^{2} (130/sq mi)
- Time zone: UTC+01:00 (CET)
  - Summer (DST): UTC+02:00 (CEST)
- Postal codes: 67724
- Dialling codes: 06361
- Vehicle registration: KIB

Gundersweiler (German pronunciation: [ˈɡʊndɐsvaɪlɐ]) is a village and a municipality in the Verbandsgemeinde Nordpfälzer Land and the Donnersbergkreis district, in Rhineland-Palatinate, Germany. It is located in the valley of Moschelbach in the North Palatine Uplands, southwest of Donnersberg and between Kaiserslautern and Bad Kreuznach.

== History ==
The first known mention of Gundersweiler is from the year 891, as 'Novale Guntharii'. The name is believed to have originated from one of the first settlers, 'Gunthari'. In 1290, the village was documented as 'Guntzwilre' and in 1355 it became part of the Electoral Palatinate. In 1515 it joined the Unteramt of Rockenhausen. During the 17th century, robber barons struck the area and the community struggled until armed knights were appointed to guard the road through the Moschelbach valley. The village and surrounding villages suffered greatly during the Thirty Years War and the majority of the area was destroyed.

In 1798, during the French Revolution, French forces annexed the west bank of the river Rhine and the village became part of the Mont-Tonnerre department, which stretched East-to-West from what is now the French border to the Rhine and North-to-South from Mainz to the French border. Within the department, it was part of the Kaiserslautern district and the canton of Rockenhausen. Once Napoleon was defeated, the Congress of Vienna allocated Gundersweiler and the surrounding area to Bavaria, where it remained between 1816 and 1945. After the Second World War, it was once again incorporated into France in the form of the French occupation zone and to the newly formed state of Rhineland-Palatinate.

== Population ==
As of 2014, the population stands at 510, the majority of whom are Protestant who are served by a Protestant church and a Protestant parsonage. The local council consists of twelve councilors.

== Sport ==
Gundersweiler has its own football team in the form of 'SV Gundersweiler', who play in the 'B-Klasse Kaiserslautern-Donnersberg Nord', on the ninth level of the German football league system. The village is surrounded by walking and cycling paths.
