= Palatine Stonemason Museum =

Museum in the village of Alsenz, Germany

Coordinates: 49.72245°N 7.81295°E

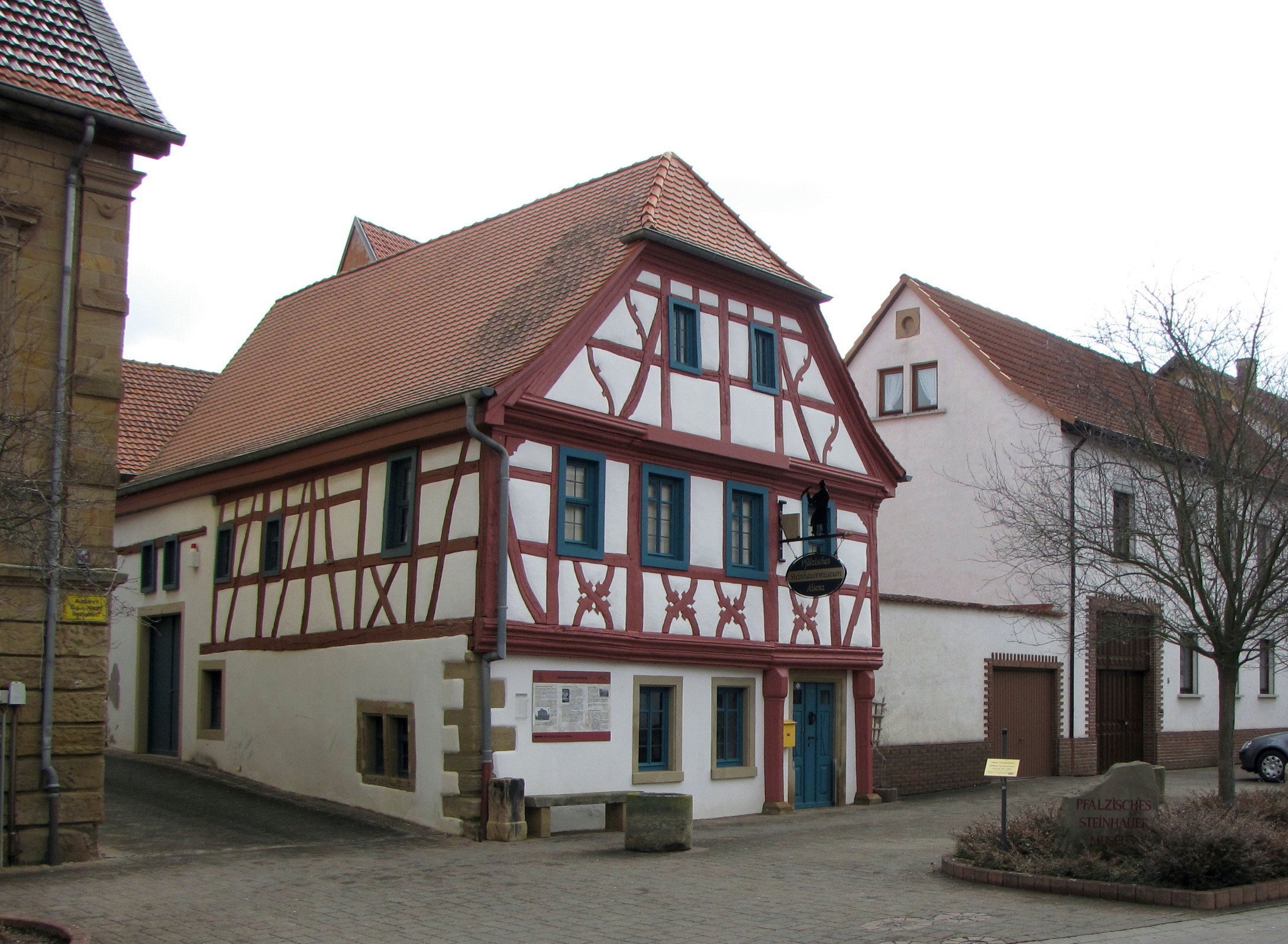

The Palatine Stonemason Museum (German: Pfälzische Steinhauermuseum) is housed in a listed, historical, timber-framed house on the market place of the village of Alsenz in the German state of Rhineland-Palatinate. The museum contains exhibits and documents related to the history of stonemasonry and the use of sandstone in the region, from quarrying to the different processing techniques. The equipment and tools of the stonecutter, the versatility of sandstone, the social history and life of stonecutters and their families, are the subject of the exhibition.

A display of sandstone samples in the lapidarium contains various sandstone species found in Germany. There are fossils, sandstone exhibits from Roman times to the present day, technical film material, lectures and readings and the specialist library provides visitors with comprehensive information on the stonemason's craft. A faithfully replicated planning and construction office gives an insight into the way of life in the 19th century. The museum also invites visitors to look at the structures of rock through a microscope and to actively work on sandstone rock using tools. The gallery regularly hosts temporary exhibitions, lectures and readings.

The main topics are technology, tools and instruments, industry and industrial history, everyday culture, handicrafts and traditions, cultural anthropology and folklore, and modern and contemporary art.
