= Nordpfälzer Land =

- Verbandsgemeinde
- Location of Nordpfälzer Land within Donnersbergkreis district
- Interactive map of Nordpfälzer Land
- Location within Germany Location within Rhineland-Palatinate
- Coordinates: 49°38′N 7°49′E
- Country: Germany
- State: Rhineland-Palatinate
- District: Donnersbergkreis
- Seat: Rockenhausen
- Subdivisions: 36 municipalities

Area
  - Total: 243.67 km^{2} (94.08 sq mi)

Population (2025-12-31)
  - Total: 17,108
  - Density: 70.210/km^{2} (181.84/sq mi)
- Time zone: UTC+01:00 (CET)
  - Summer (DST): UTC+02:00 (CEST)
- Website: www.nordpfälzerland.de

Nordpfälzer Land is a Verbandsgemeinde ("collective municipality") in the Donnersbergkreis, Rhineland-Palatinate, Germany. The seat of the Verbandsgemeinde is in Rockenhausen. It was formed on 1 January 2020 by the merger of the former Verbandsgemeinden Rockenhausen and Alsenz-Obermoschel.

The Verbandsgemeinde Nordpfälzer Land consists of the following Ortsgemeinden ("local municipalities"):

1. Alsenz
2. Bayerfeld-Steckweiler
3. Bisterschied
4. Dielkirchen
5. Dörrmoschel
6. Finkenbach-Gersweiler
7. Gaugrehweiler
8. Gehrweiler
9. Gerbach
10. Gundersweiler
11. Imsweiler
12. Kalkofen
13. Katzenbach
14. Mannweiler-Cölln
15. Münsterappel
16. Niederhausen an der Appel
17. Niedermoschel
18. Oberhausen an der Appel
19. Obermoschel
20. Oberndorf
21. Ransweiler
22. Rathskirchen
23. Reichsthal
24. Rockenhausen
25. Ruppertsecken
26. Sankt Alban
27. Schiersfeld
28. Schönborn
29. Seelen
30. Sitters
31. Stahlberg
32. Teschenmoschel
33. Unkenbach
34. Waldgrehweiler
35. Winterborn
36. Würzweiler
