= Oberhausen an der Appel =

- Municipality
- Coat of arms

- Location of Oberhausen an der Appel within Donnersbergkreis district
- Interactive map of Oberhausen an der Appel
- Location within Germany Location within Rhineland-Palatinate
- Coordinates: 49°43′13.39″N 7°52′5.98″E
- Country: Germany
- State: Rhineland-Palatinate
- District: Donnersbergkreis
- Municipal assoc.: Nordpfälzer Land

Government
  - Mayor (2019–24): Klaus Glass

Area
  - Total: 3.33 km^{2} (1.29 sq mi)
- Elevation: 210 m (690 ft)

Population (2025-12-31)
  - Total: 133
  - Density: 39.9/km^{2} (103/sq mi)
- Time zone: UTC+01:00 (CET)
  - Summer (DST): UTC+02:00 (CEST)
- Postal codes: 67822
- Dialling codes: 06362
- Vehicle registration: KIB

Oberhausen an der Appel is a municipality in the Donnersbergkreis district, in Rhineland-Palatinate, Germany.
