= Gehrweiler =

- Municipality
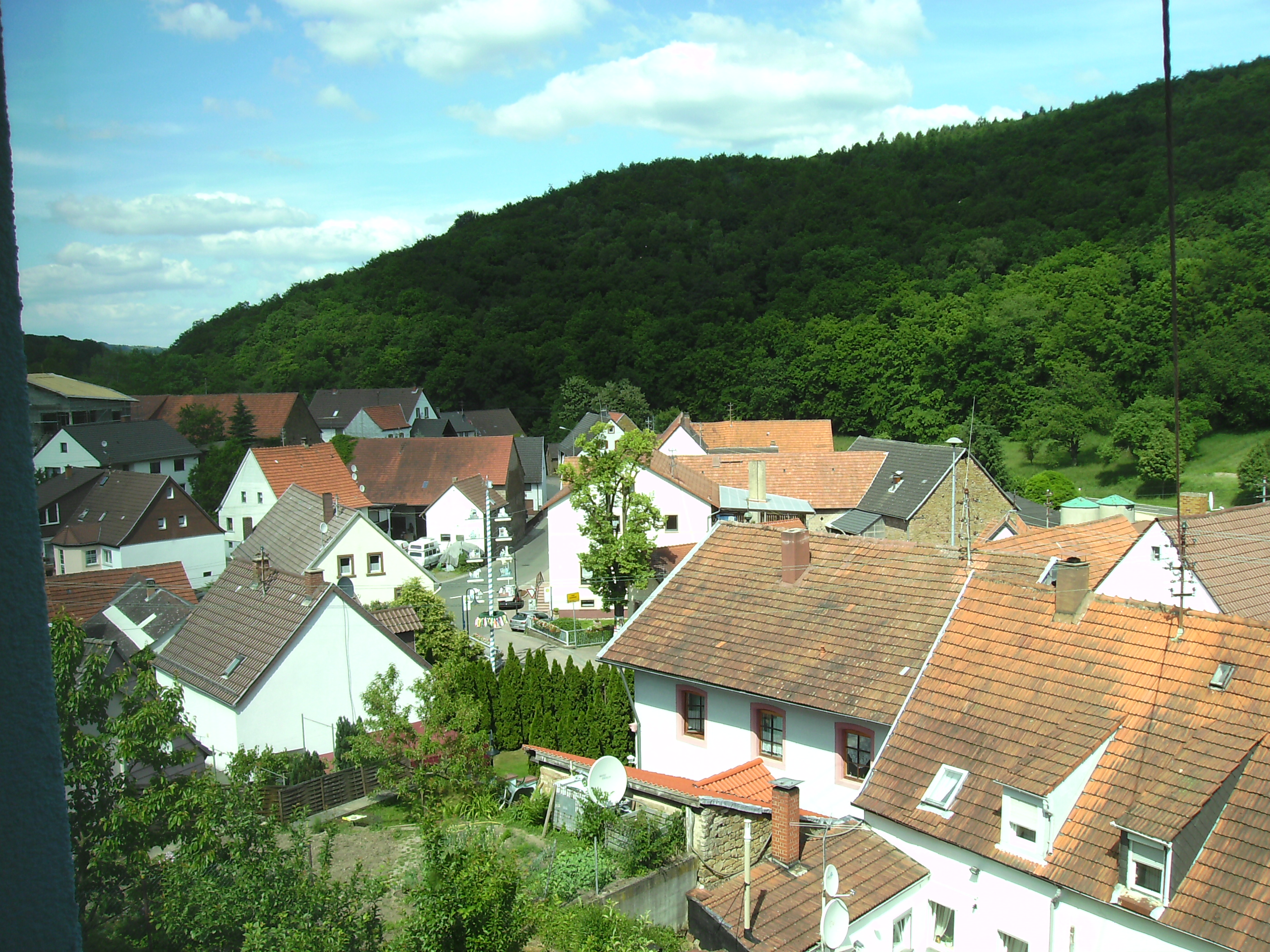

- Coat of arms

- Location of Gehrweiler within Donnersbergkreis district
- Interactive map of Gehrweiler
- Location within Germany Location within Rhineland-Palatinate
- Coordinates: 49°34′34.626″N 7°46′23.934″E
- Country: Germany
- State: Rhineland-Palatinate
- District: Donnersbergkreis
- Municipal assoc.: Nordpfälzer Land

Government
  - Mayor (2019–24): Bernhard Kiefer (SPD)

Area
  - Total: 4.09 km^{2} (1.58 sq mi)
- Elevation: 250 m (820 ft)

Population (2025-12-31)
  - Total: 291
  - Density: 71.1/km^{2} (184/sq mi)
- Time zone: UTC+01:00 (CET)
  - Summer (DST): UTC+02:00 (CEST)
- Postal codes: 67724
- Dialling codes: 06302
- Vehicle registration: KIB

Gehrweiler (German pronunciation: [ˈɡeːɐ̯vaɪlɐ]) is a municipality in the Donnersbergkreis district, in Rhineland-Palatinate, Germany.
