= Imsweiler =

- Municipality
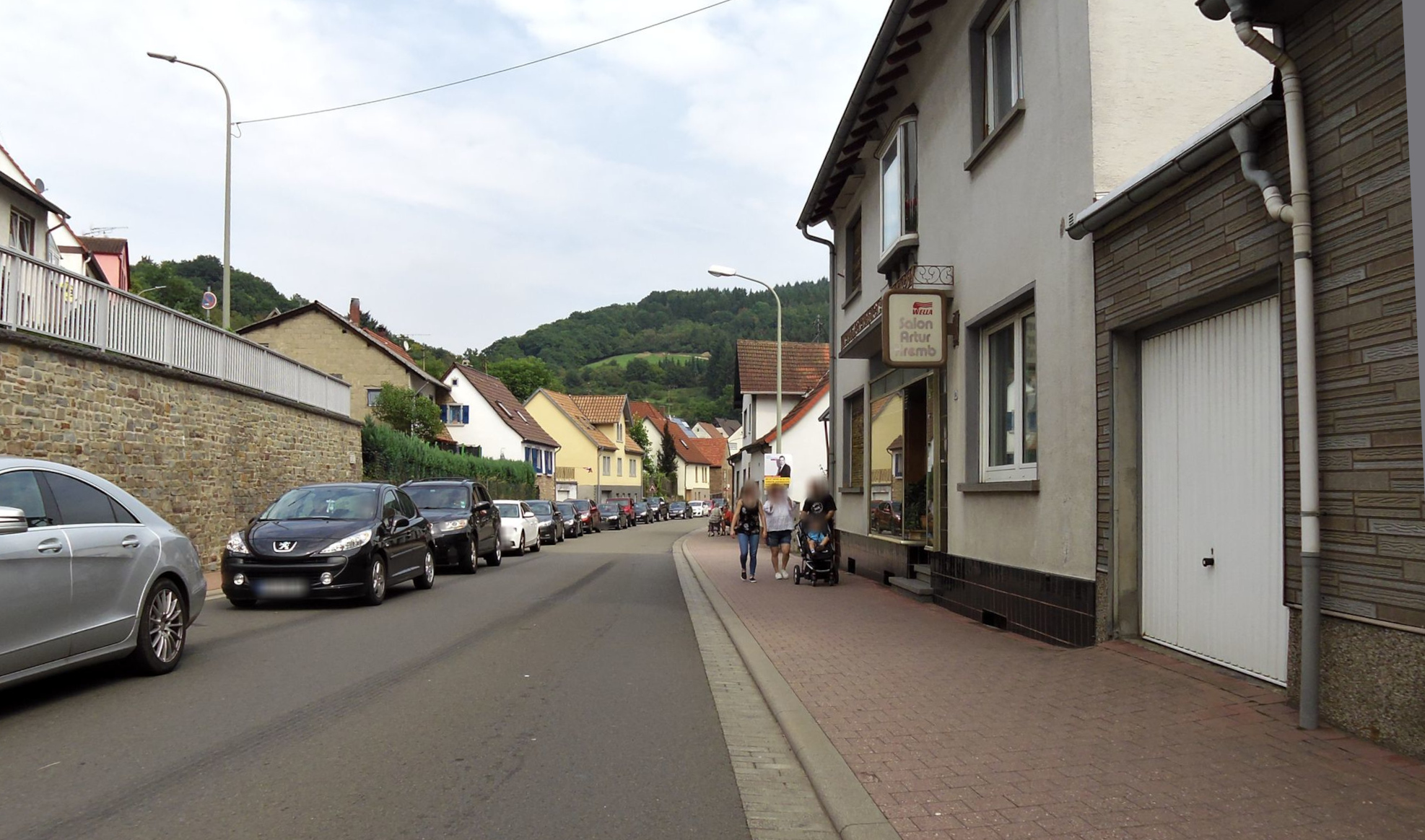
- Alsenzstraße

- Coat of arms

- Location of Imsweiler within Donnersbergkreis district
- Interactive map of Imsweiler
- Location within Germany Location within Rhineland-Palatinate
- Coordinates: 49°36′10″N 7°48′01″E
- Country: Germany
- State: Rhineland-Palatinate
- District: Donnersbergkreis
- Municipal assoc.: Nordpfälzer Land

Government
  - Mayor (2019–24): Peter Ziepser

Area
  - Total: 9.90 km^{2} (3.82 sq mi)
- Elevation: 216 m (709 ft)

Population (2025-12-31)
  - Total: 554
  - Density: 56.0/km^{2} (145/sq mi)
- Time zone: UTC+01:00 (CET)
  - Summer (DST): UTC+02:00 (CEST)
- Postal codes: 67808
- Dialling codes: 06361, 06363
- Vehicle registration: KIB

Imsweiler is a municipality in the Donnersbergkreis district, in Rhineland-Palatinate, Germany.
