= Bisterschied =

- Municipality
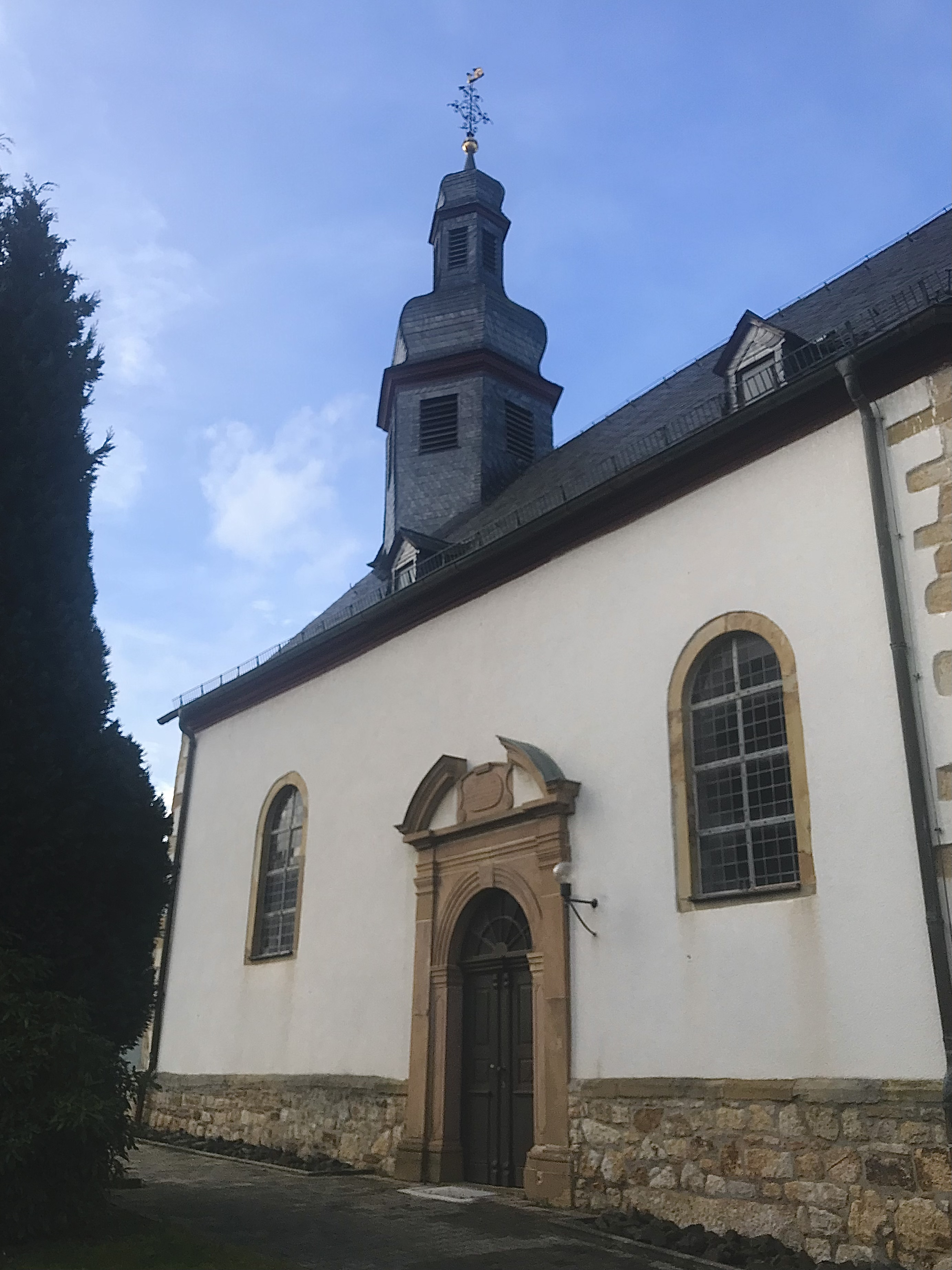
- protestant church

- Coat of arms

- Location of Bisterschied within Donnersbergkreis district
- Interactive map of Bisterschied
- Location within Germany Location within Rhineland-Palatinate
- Coordinates: 49°38′44.1″N 7°44′57.85″E
- Country: Germany
- State: Rhineland-Palatinate
- District: Donnersbergkreis
- Municipal assoc.: Nordpfälzer Land

Government
  - Mayor (2019–24): Erich Dindorf

Area
  - Total: 5.15 km^{2} (1.99 sq mi)
- Elevation: 330 m (1,080 ft)

Population (2025-12-31)
  - Total: 230
  - Density: 45/km^{2} (120/sq mi)
- Time zone: UTC+01:00 (CET)
  - Summer (DST): UTC+02:00 (CEST)
- Postal codes: 67806
- Dialling codes: 06364
- Vehicle registration: KIB

Bisterschied (German pronunciation: [ˈbɪstɐʃiːt]) is a municipality in the Donnersbergkreis district, in Rhineland-Palatinate, Germany. Bennhausen has an area of 5.16 km^{2} and a population of 232 (as of December 31, 2020).
