= Waldgrehweiler =

- Municipality
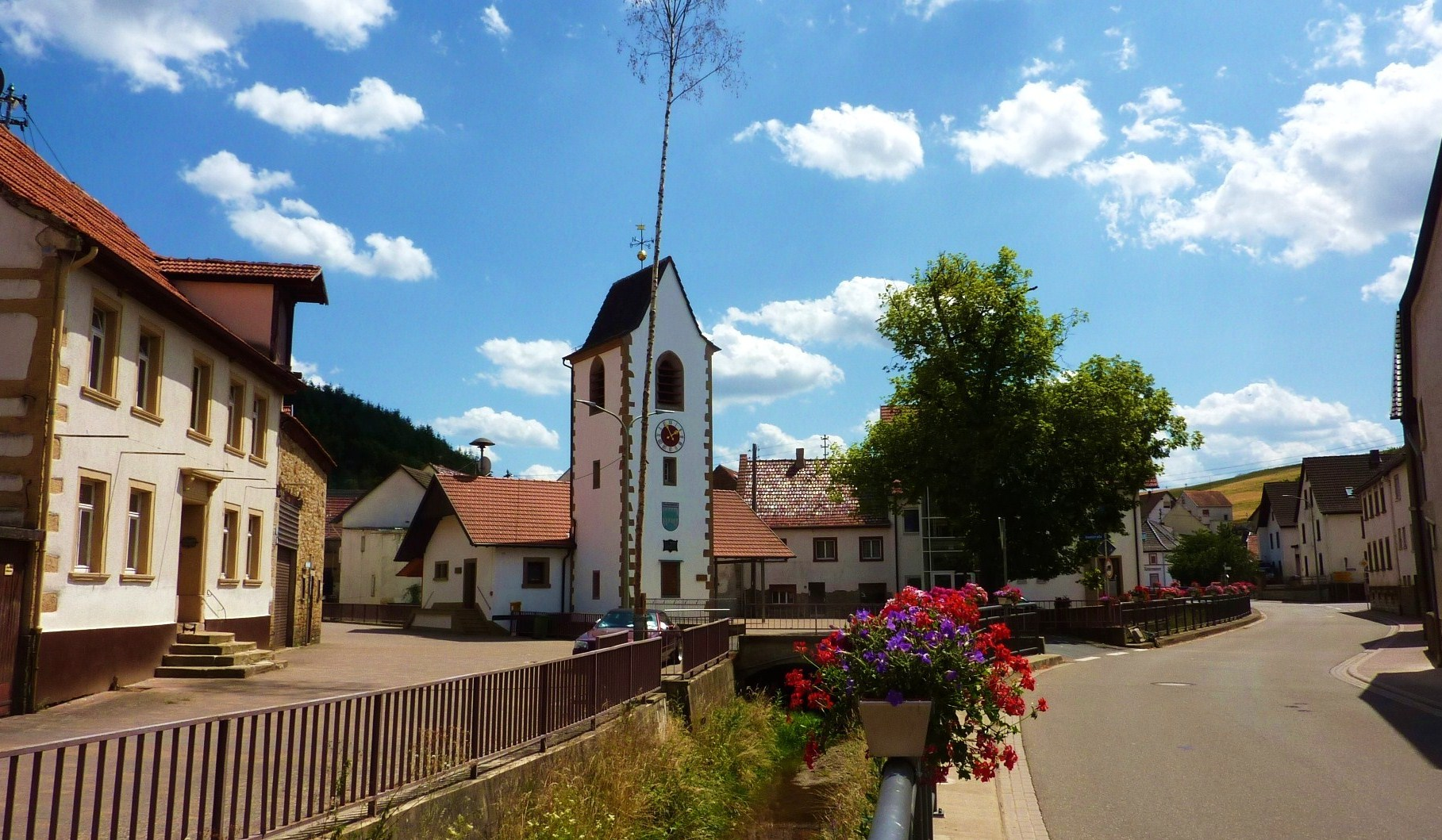
- bell tower (built in 1927)

- Coat of arms

- Location of Waldgrehweiler within Donnersbergkreis district
- Interactive map of Waldgrehweiler
- Location within Germany Location within Rhineland-Palatinate
- Coordinates: 49°40′11″N 7°44′36″E
- Country: Germany
- State: Rhineland-Palatinate
- District: Donnersbergkreis
- Municipal assoc.: Nordpfälzer Land

Government
  - Mayor (2019–24): Helmut Brand

Area
  - Total: 7.75 km^{2} (2.99 sq mi)
- Elevation: 240 m (790 ft)

Population (2025-12-31)
  - Total: 211
  - Density: 27.2/km^{2} (70.5/sq mi)
- Time zone: UTC+01:00 (CET)
  - Summer (DST): UTC+02:00 (CEST)
- Postal codes: 67822
- Dialling codes: 06364
- Vehicle registration: KIB

Waldgrehweiler is a municipality in the Donnersbergkreis district, in Rhineland-Palatinate, Germany.
