= Ruppertsecken =

- Municipality
- Coat of arms

- Location of Ruppertsecken within Donnersbergkreis district
- Interactive map of Ruppertsecken
- Location within Germany Location within Rhineland-Palatinate
- Coordinates: 49°38′42″N 7°52′51″E
- Country: Germany
- State: Rhineland-Palatinate
- District: Donnersbergkreis
- Municipal assoc.: Nordpfälzer Land

Government
  - Mayor (2019–24): Siegmar Portz

Area
  - Total: 9.43 km^{2} (3.64 sq mi)
- Elevation: 498 m (1,634 ft)

Population (2025-12-31)
  - Total: 336
  - Density: 35.6/km^{2} (92.3/sq mi)
- Time zone: UTC+01:00 (CET)
  - Summer (DST): UTC+02:00 (CEST)
- Postal codes: 67808
- Dialling codes: 06361
- Vehicle registration: KIB
- Website: www.ruppertsecken.de

Ruppertsecken is a municipality in the Donnersbergkreis district, in Rhineland-Palatinate, Germany.

With an altitude of 498.5 m (1636.5 ft) above NHN it is the highest independent village in the Palatinate.
