= Katzenbach, Germany =

Katzenbach
- Municipality
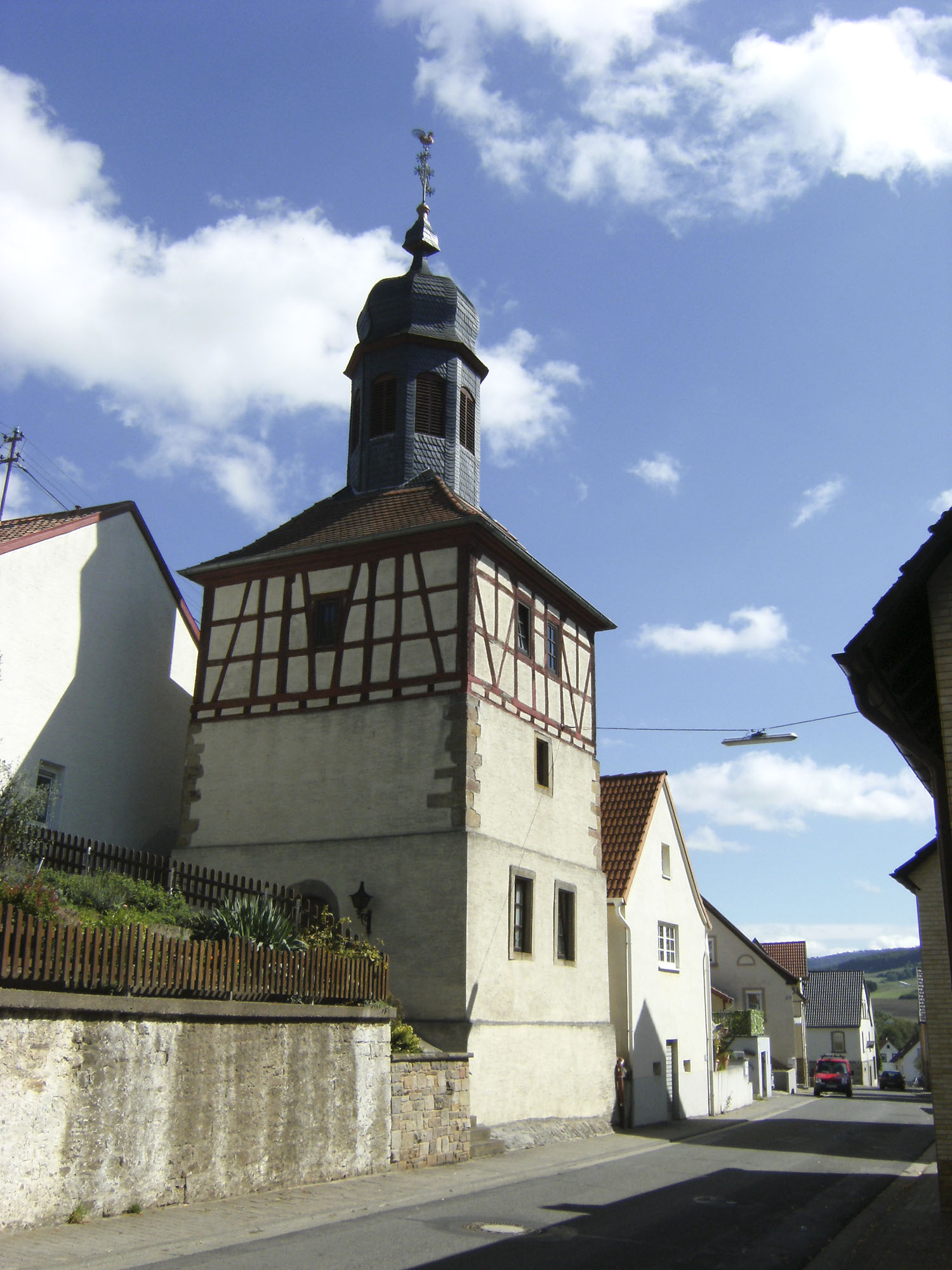
- Katzenbach bell tower

- Coat of arms

- Location of Katzenbach within Donnersbergkreis district
- Interactive map of Katzenbach
- Location within Germany Location within Rhineland-Palatinate
- Coordinates: 49°38′41″N 7°48′34″E
- Country: Germany
- State: Rhineland-Palatinate
- District: Donnersbergkreis
- Municipal assoc.: Nordpfälzer Land

Government
  - Mayor (2019–24): Volker Köhler

Area
  - Total: 6.05 km^{2} (2.34 sq mi)
- Elevation: 220 m (720 ft)

Population (2025-12-31)
  - Total: 470
  - Density: 78/km^{2} (200/sq mi)
- Time zone: UTC+01:00 (CET)
  - Summer (DST): UTC+02:00 (CEST)
- Postal codes: 67806
- Dialling codes: 06361
- Vehicle registration: KIB

Katzenbach (German pronunciation: [ˈkatsn̩bax]) is a municipality in the Donnersbergkreis district, in Rhineland-Palatinate, Germany.
