= Alsenz (river) =

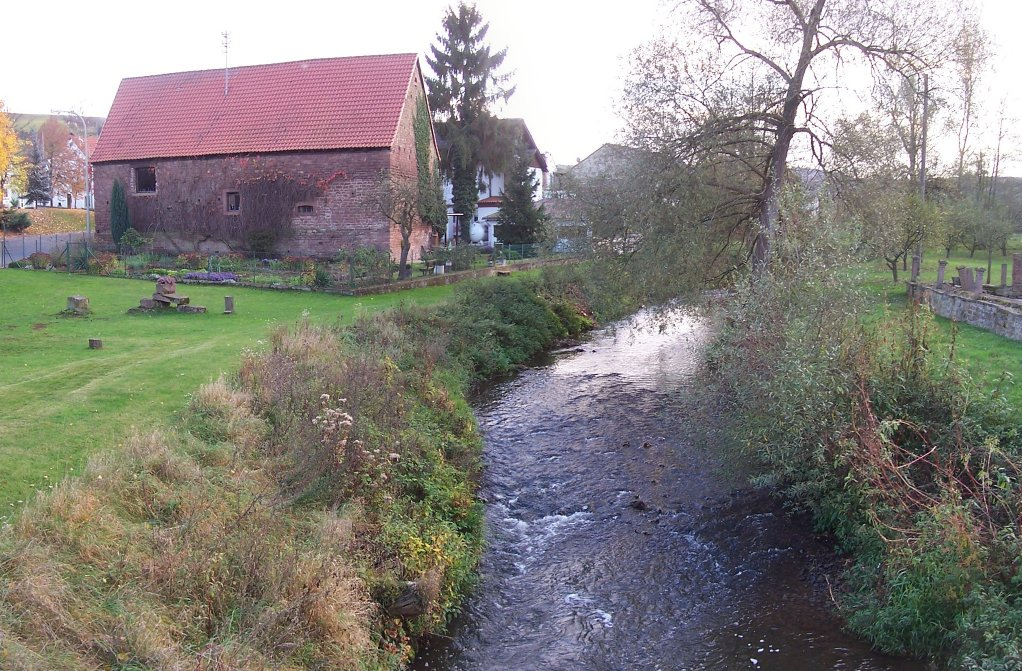

Location
- Country: Germany
- State: Rhineland-Palatinate

Physical characteristics
- Mouth
  - location: Nahe
  - coordinates: 49°48′27″N 7°50′33″E
- Length: 57 km (35 mi)

Basin features
- Progression: Nahe→ Rhine→ North Sea

The Alsenz (German pronunciation: [ˈalzɛnts]) is a river in Rhineland-Palatinate, Germany, a right tributary to the Nahe. It rises in Enkenbach-Alsenborn, north-east of Kaiserslautern, flows generally north, and joins the Nahe in Bad Münster am Stein-Ebernburg. Its length is roughly 57 kilometres (35 mi). Towns along the Alsenz include Winnweiler, Rockenhausen and Alsenz.

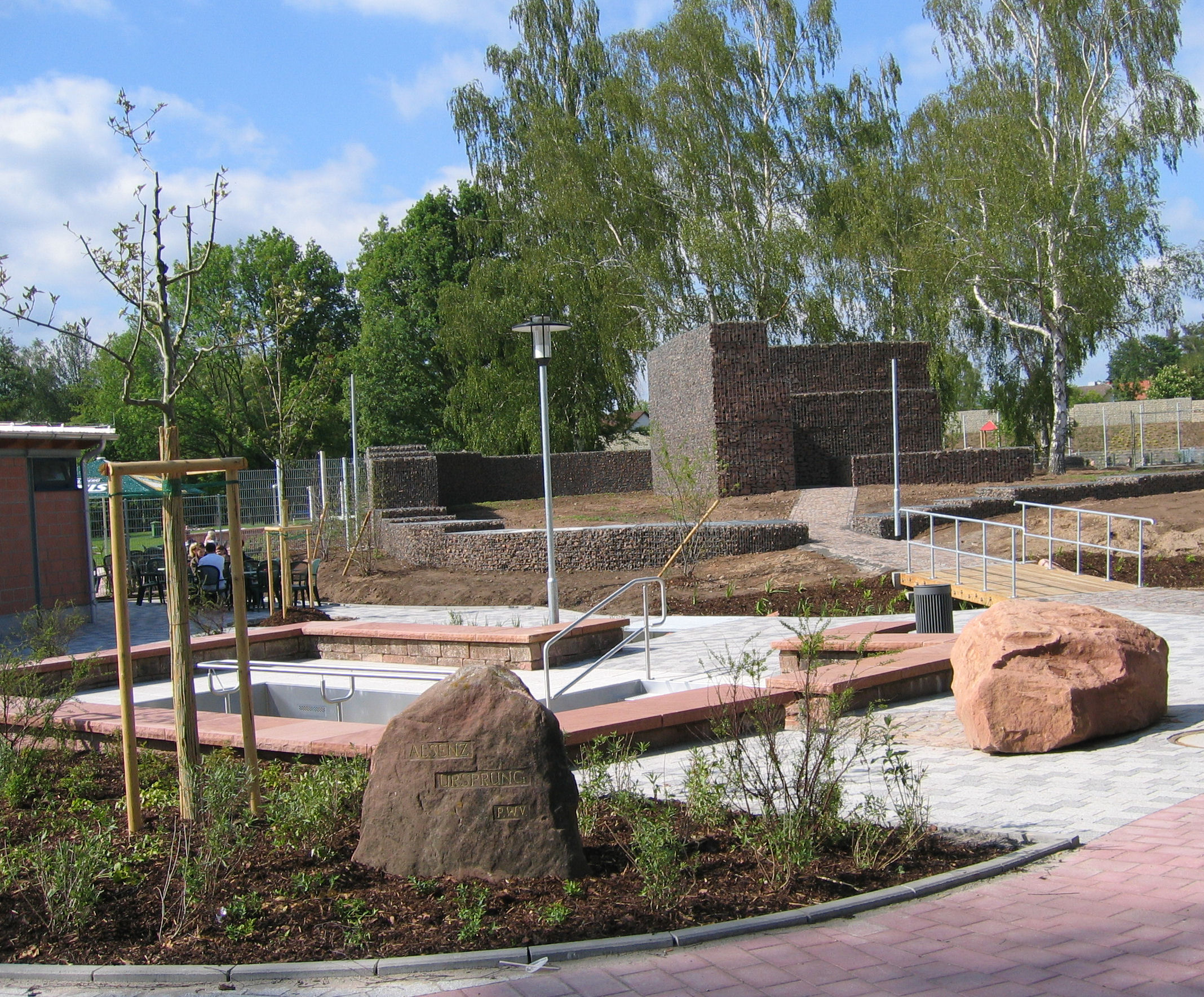
Source, Alsenborn

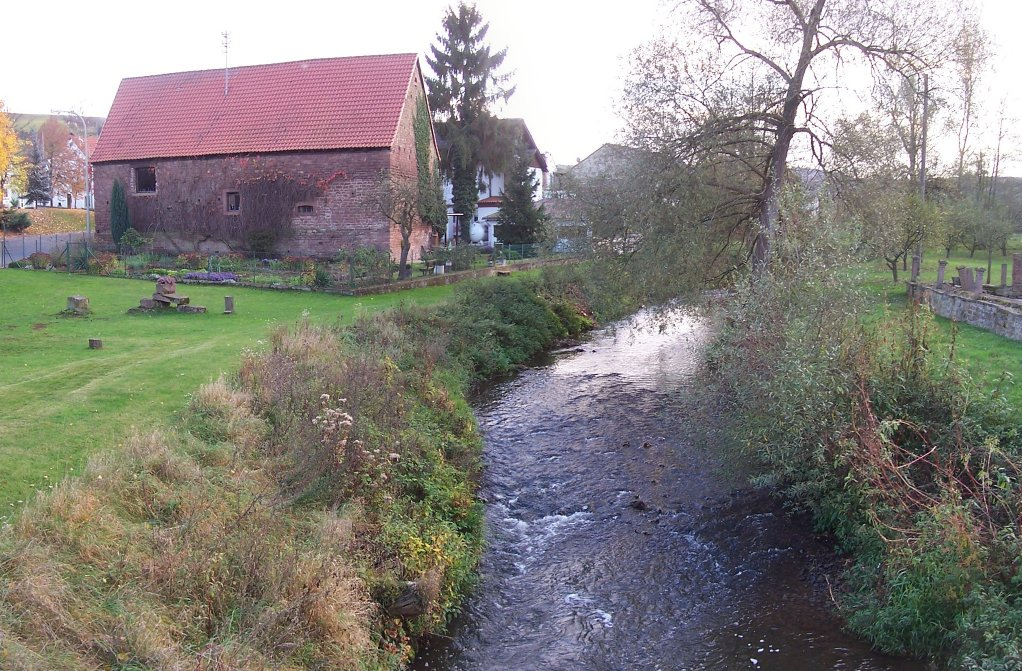
Oberndorf, Rhineland-Palatinate

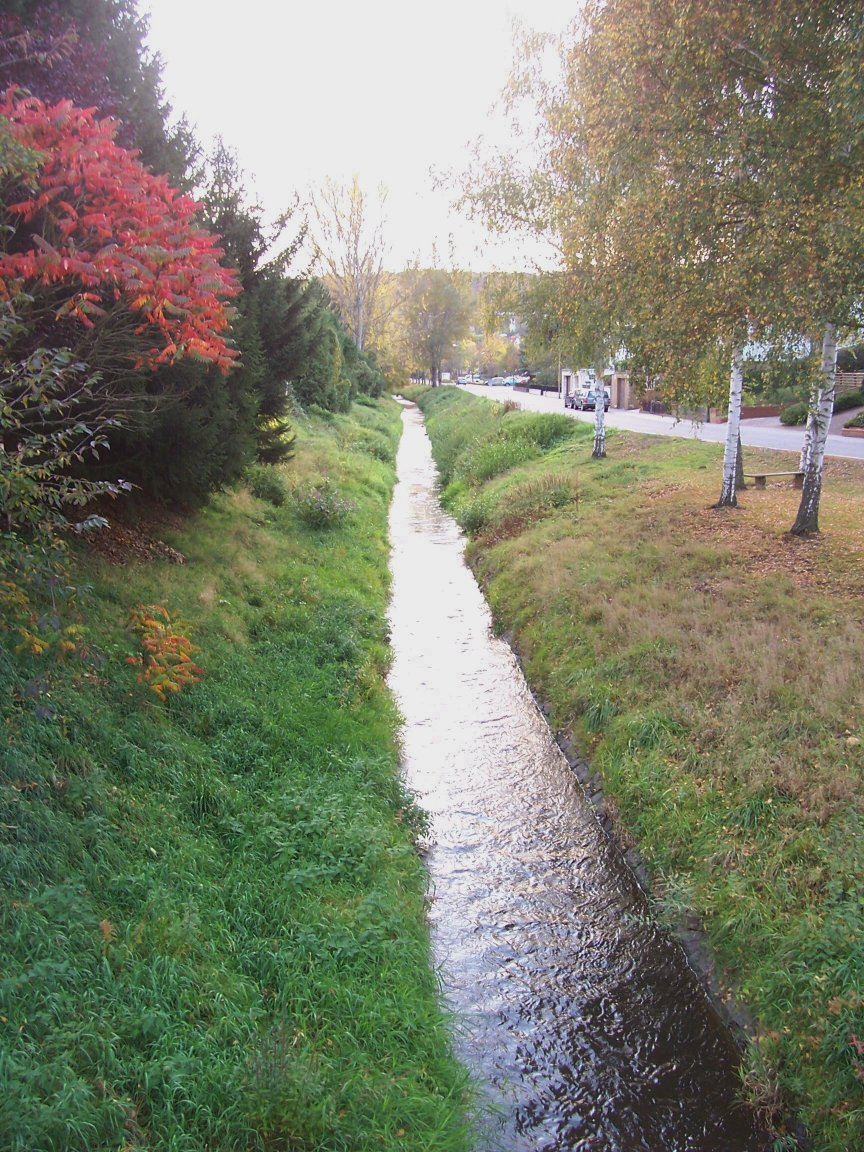
Alsenz
