= Dörrmoschel =

- Municipality
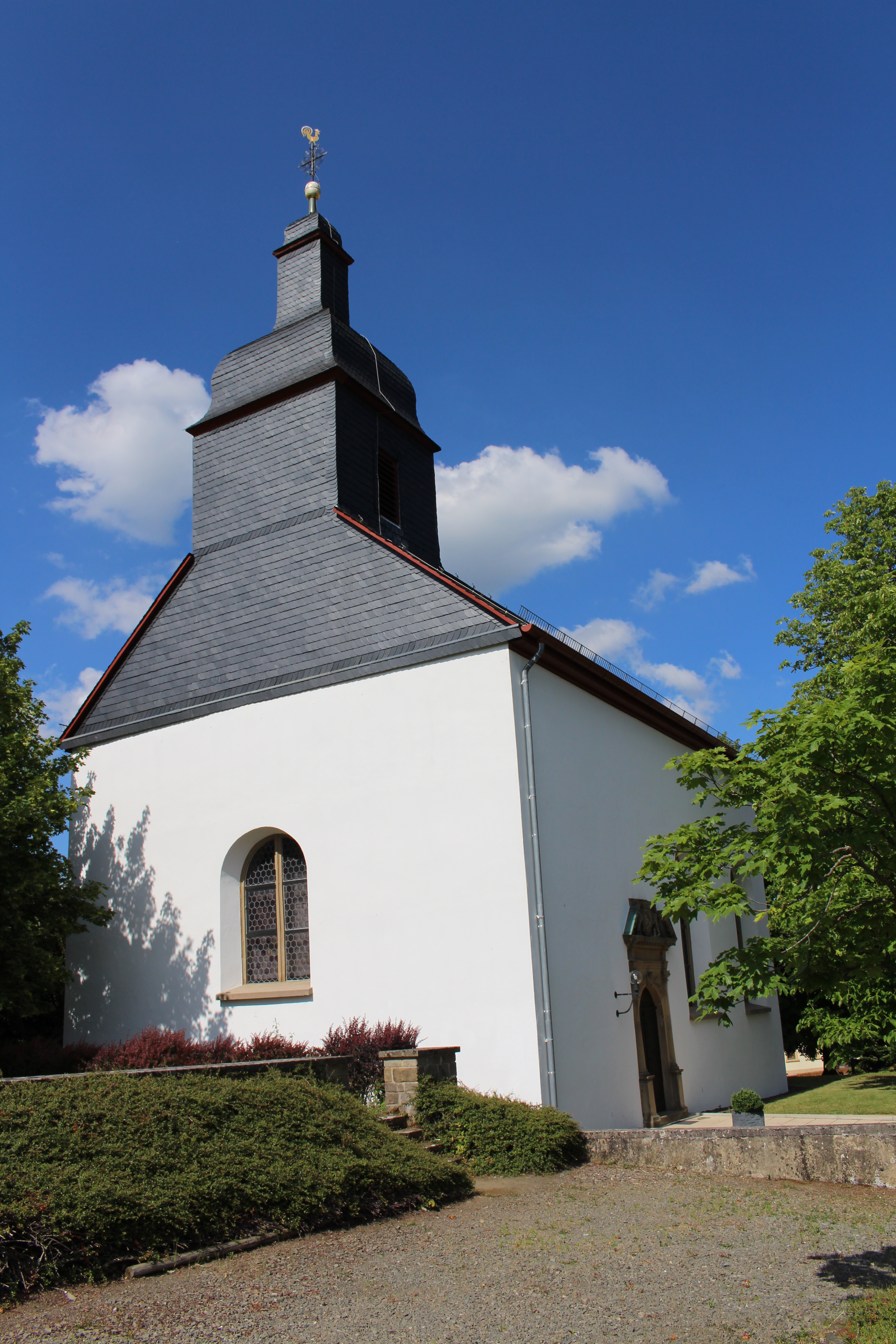
- protestant church

- Coat of arms

- Location of Dörrmoschel within Donnersbergkreis district
- Interactive map of Dörrmoschel
- Location within Germany Location within Rhineland-Palatinate
- Coordinates: 49°37′7.69″N 7°45′7.8″E
- Country: Germany
- State: Rhineland-Palatinate
- District: Donnersbergkreis
- Municipal assoc.: Nordpfälzer Land

Government
  - Mayor (2019–24): Uwe Edmund Rainau

Area
  - Total: 2.88 km^{2} (1.11 sq mi)
- Elevation: 370 m (1,210 ft)

Population (2025-12-31)
  - Total: 132
  - Density: 45.8/km^{2} (119/sq mi)
- Time zone: UTC+01:00 (CET)
  - Summer (DST): UTC+02:00 (CEST)
- Postal codes: 67806
- Dialling codes: 06361
- Vehicle registration: KIB

Dörrmoschel is a municipality in the Donnersbergkreis district, in Rhineland-Palatinate, Germany. Dörrmoschel has an area of 2.88 km² and has an estimated population of 132 (as of December 31, 2025).
