= Teschenmoschel =

- Municipality
- Coat of arms

- Location of Teschenmoschel within Donnersbergkreis district
- Interactive map of Teschenmoschel
- Location within Germany Location within Rhineland-Palatinate
- Coordinates: 49°37′54″N 7°44′0″E
- Country: Germany
- State: Rhineland-Palatinate
- District: Donnersbergkreis
- Municipal assoc.: Nordpfälzer Land

Government
  - Mayor (2019–24): Sabine Küsters

Area
  - Total: 3.73 km^{2} (1.44 sq mi)
- Elevation: 332 m (1,089 ft)

Population (2025-12-31)
  - Total: 125
  - Density: 33.5/km^{2} (86.8/sq mi)
- Time zone: UTC+01:00 (CET)
  - Summer (DST): UTC+02:00 (CEST)
- Postal codes: 67806
- Dialling codes: 06364
- Vehicle registration: KIB

Teschenmoschel is a municipality in the Donnersbergkreis district, in Rhineland-Palatinate, Germany.
