= Niederhausen an der Appel =

- Municipality
- Coat of arms

- Location of Niederhausen an der Appel within Donnersbergkreis district
- Interactive map of Niederhausen an der Appel
- Location within Germany Location within Rhineland-Palatinate
- Coordinates: 49°44′50″N 7°53′34″E
- Country: Germany
- State: Rhineland-Palatinate
- District: Donnersbergkreis
- Municipal assoc.: Nordpfälzer Land

Government
  - Mayor (2019–24): Jutta Kreis

Area
  - Total: 5.46 km^{2} (2.11 sq mi)
- Elevation: 191 m (627 ft)

Population (2025-12-31)
  - Total: 224
  - Density: 41.0/km^{2} (106/sq mi)
- Time zone: UTC+01:00 (CET)
  - Summer (DST): UTC+02:00 (CEST)
- Postal codes: 67822
- Dialling codes: 06362
- Vehicle registration: KIB

Niederhausen an der Appel is a municipality in the Donnersbergkreis district, in Rhineland-Palatinate, Germany.
