= Donnersbergkreis =

Coordinates: 49°38′N 7°55′E

- District
- Flag Coat of arms
- Country: Germany
- State: Rhineland-Palatinate
- Capital: Kirchheimbolanden

Government
  - District admin.: Rainer Guth

Area
  - Total: 645.46 km^{2} (249.21 sq mi)

Population (31 December 2023)
  - Total: 76,088
  - Density: 117.88/km^{2} (305.31/sq mi)
- Time zone: UTC+01:00 (CET)
  - Summer (DST): UTC+02:00 (CEST)
- Vehicle registration: KIB, ROK
- Website: donnersberg.de

The Donnersbergkreis is a district (Kreis) in the middle of Rhineland-Palatinate, Germany. Neighboring districts are Bad Kreuznach, Alzey-Worms, Bad Dürkheim, Kaiserslautern, Kusel.

== History ==
The district was created in 1969 by merging the districts Kirchheimbolanden and Rockenhausen.

== Geography ==
The district is located around the highest mountain of the Palatinate, the Donnersberg with 687 m above sea level.

== Coat of arms ==
Both of the districts merged into the Donnersbergkreis had a wheel in their coat of arms, which are now also shown in the coat of arms of the new district. On the left is the red wheel of the Lords of Bolanden, taken from the Kirchheim coat of arms. The blue wheel on the right is the wheel of the Lords of Falkenstein, taken from the Rockenhausen coat of arms. The green field on the bottom with the peak symbolizes the Donnersberg, the highest elevation in the district, and the sun the importance of the sunny plains for viticulture.

== Towns and municipalities ==
Verbandsgemeinden
1. Eisenberg; 1. Eisenberg^{1, 2}; 2. Kerzenheim; 3. Ramsen; 2. Göllheim; 1. Albisheim; 2. Biedesheim; 3. Bubenheim; 4. Dreisen; 5. Einselthum; 6. Göllheim^{1}; 7. Immesheim; 8. Lautersheim; 9. Ottersheim; 10. Rüssingen; 11. Standenbühl; 12. Weitersweiler; 13. Zellertal	3. Kirchheimbolanden; 1. Bennhausen; 2. Bischheim; 3. Bolanden; 4. Dannenfels; 5. Gauersheim; 6. Ilbesheim; 7. Jakobsweiler; 8. Kirchheimbolanden^{1, 2}; 9. Kriegsfeld; 10. Marnheim; 11. Mörsfeld; 12. Morschheim; 13. Oberwiesen; 14. Orbis; 15. Rittersheim; 16. Stetten	4. Nordpfälzer Land; 1. Alsenz; 2. Bayerfeld-Steckweiler; 3. Bisterschied; 4. Dielkirchen; 5. Dörrmoschel; 6. Finkenbach-Gersweiler; 7. Gaugrehweiler; 8. Gehrweiler; 9. Gerbach; 10. Gundersweiler; 11. Imsweiler; 12. Kalkofen; 13. Katzenbach; 14. Mannweiler-Cölln; 15. Münsterappel; 16. Niederhausen an der Appel; 17. Niedermoschel; 18. Oberhausen an der Appel	19. Obermoschel^{2}; 20. Oberndorf; 21. Ransweiler; 22. Rathskirchen; 23. Reichsthal; 24. Rockenhausen^{1, 2}; 25. Ruppertsecken; 26. Sankt Alban; 27. Schiersfeld; 28. Schönborn; 29. Seelen; 30. Sitters; 31. Stahlberg; 32. Teschenmoschel; 33. Unkenbach; 34. Waldgrehweiler; 35. Winterborn; 36. Würzweiler	5. Winnweiler; 1. Börrstadt; 2. Breunigweiler; 3. Falkenstein; 4. Gonbach; 5. Höringen; 6. Imsbach; 7. Lohnsfeld; 8. Münchweiler an der Alsenz; 9. Schweisweiler; 10. Sippersfeld; 11. Steinbach am Donnersberg; 12. Wartenberg-Rohrbach; 13. Winnweiler^{1}
^{1}seat of the Verbandsgemeinde; ^{2}town
