= Winterborn, Rhineland-Palatinate =

Winterborn
- Municipality
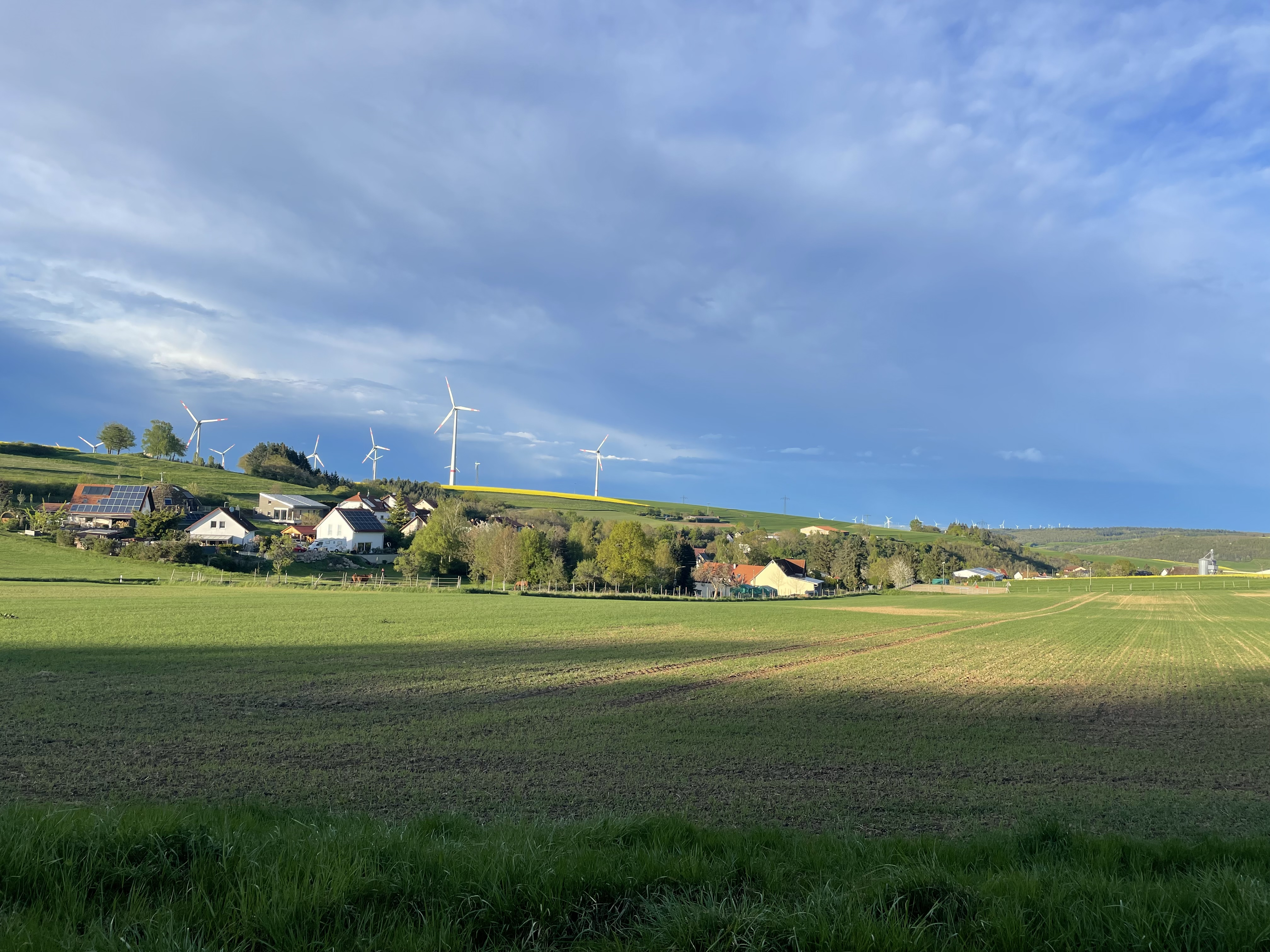
- View from the West

- Coat of arms

- Location of Winterborn within Donnersbergkreis district
- Interactive map of Winterborn
- Location within Germany Location within Rhineland-Palatinate
- Coordinates: 49°44′50″N 7°51′53″E
- Country: Germany
- State: Rhineland-Palatinate
- District: Donnersbergkreis
- Municipal assoc.: Nordpfälzer Land

Government
  - Mayor (2019–24): Thomas Mettel

Area
  - Total: 8.45 km^{2} (3.26 sq mi)
- Elevation: 309 m (1,014 ft)

Population (2025-12-31)
  - Total: 160
  - Density: 19/km^{2} (49/sq mi)
- Time zone: UTC+01:00 (CET)
  - Summer (DST): UTC+02:00 (CEST)
- Postal codes: 67822
- Dialling codes: 06362, 02293
- Vehicle registration: KIB

Winterborn (German pronunciation: [ˈvɪntɐbɔʁn]) is a municipality in the Donnersbergkreis district, in Rhineland-Palatinate, Germany.
