= Sitters, Germany =

Sitters
- Municipality
- Coat of arms

- Location of Sitters within Donnersbergkreis district
- Interactive map of Sitters
- Location within Germany Location within Rhineland-Palatinate
- Coordinates: 49°42′29.14″N 7°46′57.16″E
- Country: Germany
- State: Rhineland-Palatinate
- District: Donnersbergkreis
- Municipal assoc.: Nordpfälzer Land

Government
  - Mayor (2019–24): Kurt Enders

Area
  - Total: 2.63 km^{2} (1.02 sq mi)
- Elevation: 198 m (650 ft)

Population (2025-12-31)
  - Total: 93
  - Density: 35/km^{2} (92/sq mi)
- Time zone: UTC+01:00 (CET)
  - Summer (DST): UTC+02:00 (CEST)
- Postal codes: 67823
- Dialling codes: 06362
- Vehicle registration: KIB
- Website: www.sitters-pfalz.de

Sitters (German pronunciation: [ˈzɪtɐs]) is a municipality in the Donnersbergkreis district, in Rhineland-Palatinate, Germany.
