= Unkenbach =

- Municipality
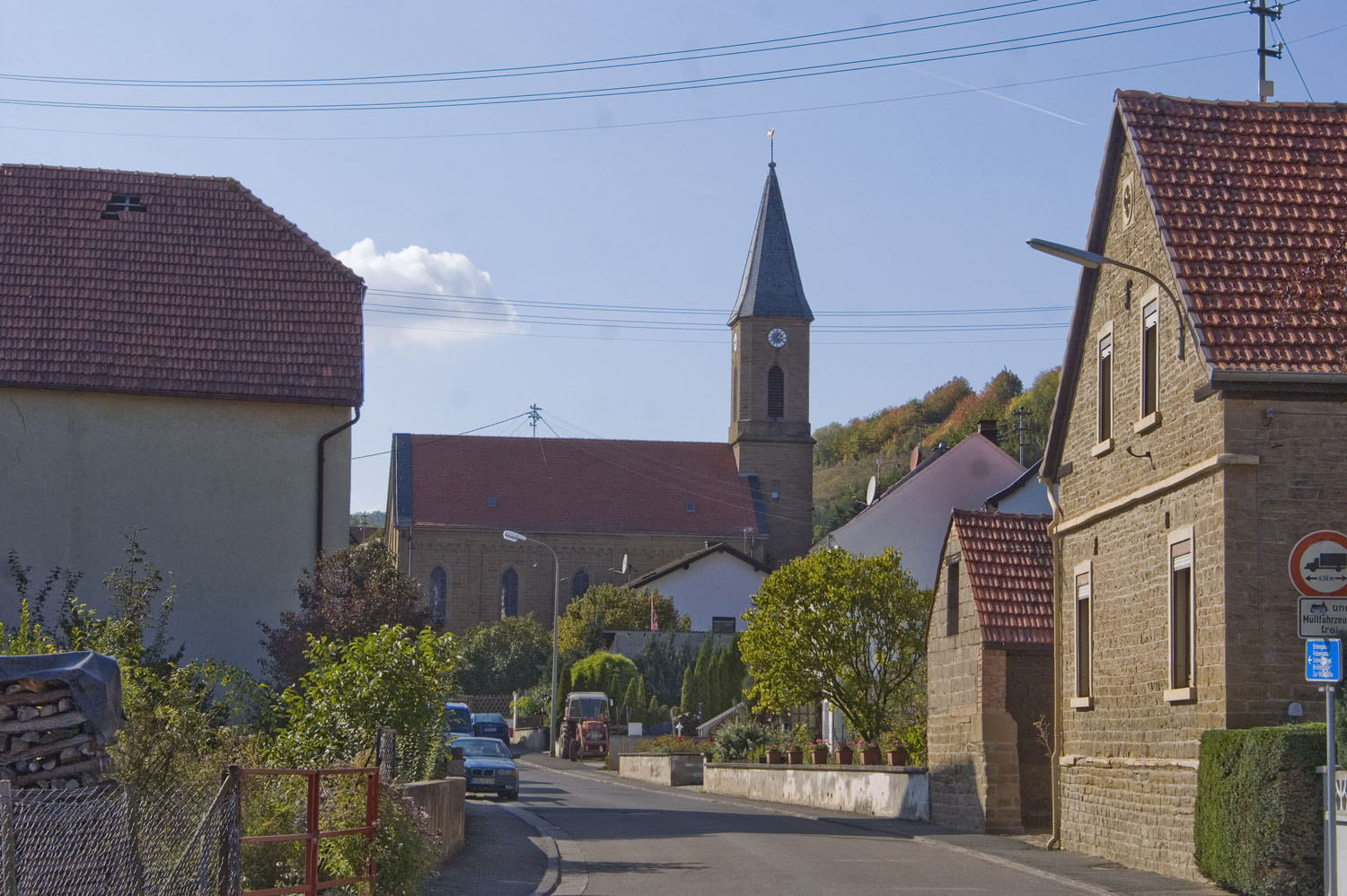

- Coat of arms

- Location of Unkenbach within Donnersbergkreis district
- Interactive map of Unkenbach
- Location within Germany Location within Rhineland-Palatinate
- Coordinates: 49°43′09″N 7°44′41″E
- Country: Germany
- State: Rhineland-Palatinate
- District: Donnersbergkreis
- Municipal assoc.: Nordpfälzer Land

Government
  - Mayor (2019–24): Frank Müller

Area
  - Total: 5.12 km^{2} (1.98 sq mi)
- Elevation: 229 m (751 ft)

Population (2025-12-31)
  - Total: 190
  - Density: 37/km^{2} (96/sq mi)
- Time zone: UTC+01:00 (CET)
  - Summer (DST): UTC+02:00 (CEST)
- Postal codes: 67823
- Dialling codes: 06362
- Vehicle registration: KIB

Unkenbach (German pronunciation: [ˈʊŋkn̩bax]) is a municipality in the Donnersbergkreis district, in Rhineland-Palatinate, Germany.
