= Münsterappel =

- Municipality
- Coat of arms

- Location of Münsterappel within Donnersbergkreis district
- Interactive map of Münsterappel
- Location within Germany Location within Rhineland-Palatinate
- Coordinates: 49°44′08″N 7°52′40″E
- Country: Germany
- State: Rhineland-Palatinate
- District: Donnersbergkreis
- Municipal assoc.: Nordpfälzer Land

Government
  - Mayor (2019–24): Gernot Pietzsch

Area
  - Total: 6.33 km^{2} (2.44 sq mi)
- Elevation: 199 m (653 ft)

Population (2025-12-31)
  - Total: 479
  - Density: 75.7/km^{2} (196/sq mi)
- Time zone: UTC+01:00 (CET)
  - Summer (DST): UTC+02:00 (CEST)
- Postal codes: 67822
- Dialling codes: 06362
- Vehicle registration: KIB

Münsterappel is a municipality in the Donnersbergkreis district, in Rhineland-Palatinate, Germany.
