= Dielkirchen =

- Municipality
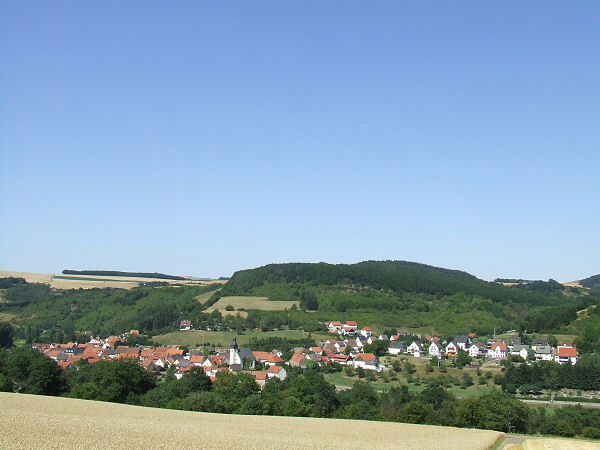

- Coat of arms

- Location of Dielkirchen within Donnersbergkreis district
- Interactive map of Dielkirchen
- Location within Germany Location within Rhineland-Palatinate
- Coordinates: 49°39′38″N 7°49′02″E
- Country: Germany
- State: Rhineland-Palatinate
- District: Donnersbergkreis
- Municipal assoc.: Nordpfälzer Land

Government
  - Mayor (2019–24): Werner Maximilian Lieb

Area
  - Total: 8.1 km^{2} (3.1 sq mi)
- Elevation: 194 m (636 ft)

Population (2025-12-31)
  - Total: 446
  - Density: 55/km^{2} (140/sq mi)
- Time zone: UTC+01:00 (CET)
  - Summer (DST): UTC+02:00 (CEST)
- Postal codes: 67811
- Dialling codes: 06361
- Vehicle registration: KIB

Dielkirchen (German pronunciation: [diːlˈkɪʁçn̩]) is a municipality in the Donnersbergkreis district, in Rhineland-Palatinate, Germany. Dielkirchen has an area of 8.10 km² and a population of 453 (as of December 31, 2020).
