= Sankt Alban =

- Municipality
- Coat of arms

- Location of Sankt Alban within Donnersbergkreis district
- Interactive map of Sankt Alban
- Location within Germany Location within Rhineland-Palatinate
- Coordinates: 49°41′04″N 07°51′49″E
- Country: Germany
- State: Rhineland-Palatinate
- District: Donnersbergkreis
- Municipal assoc.: Nordpfälzer Land

Government
  - Mayor (2019–24): Petra Becher

Area
  - Total: 5.46 km^{2} (2.11 sq mi)
- Elevation: 247 m (810 ft)

Population (2025-12-31)
  - Total: 269
  - Density: 49.3/km^{2} (128/sq mi)
- Time zone: UTC+01:00 (CET)
  - Summer (DST): UTC+02:00 (CEST)
- Postal codes: 67813
- Dialling codes: 06362
- Vehicle registration: KIB

Sankt Alban is a municipality in the Donnersbergkreis district, in Rhineland-Palatinate, Germany.
