= Schiersfeld =

- Municipality
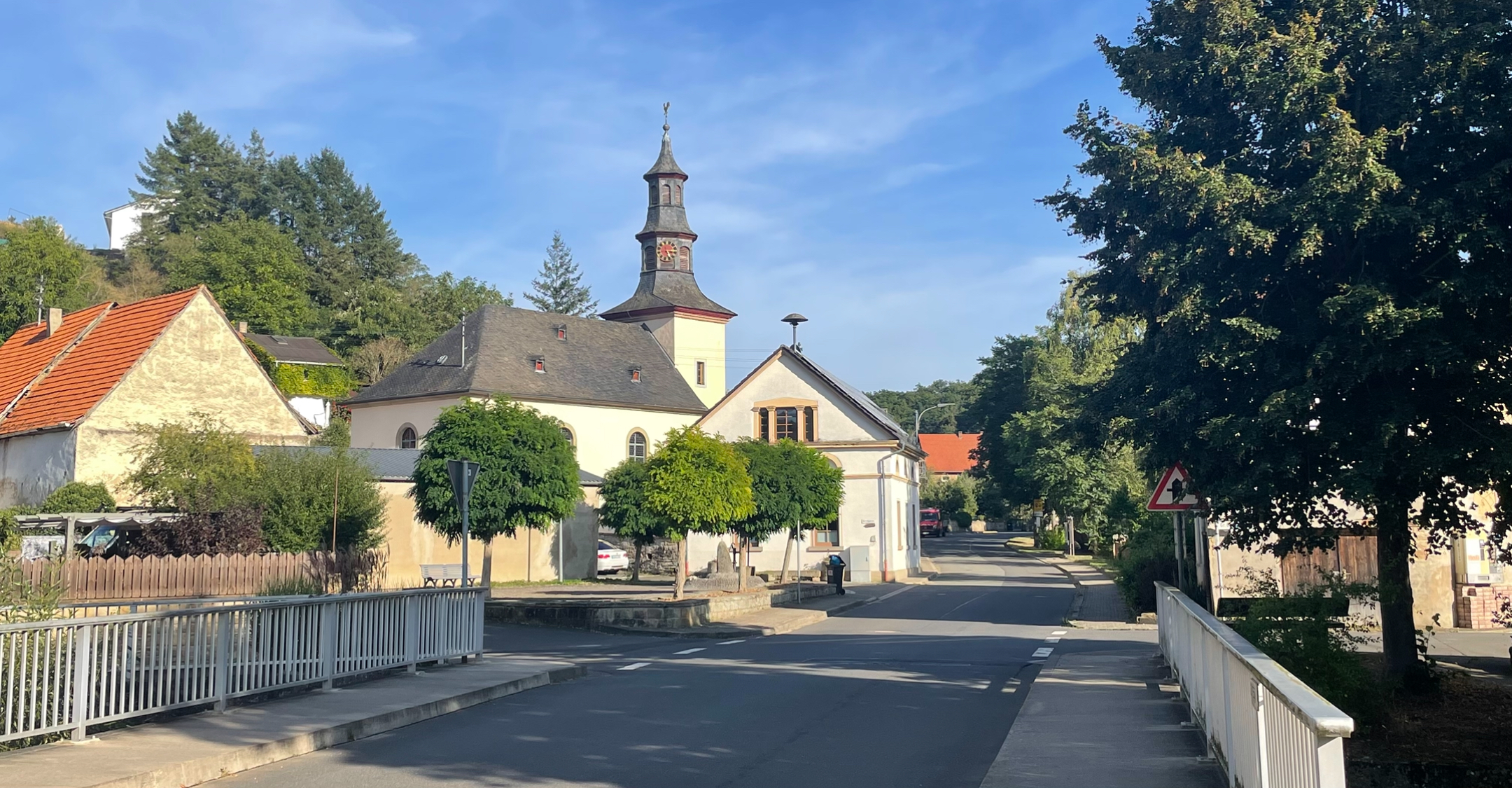
- Bismarckstraße with the baroque church

- Coat of arms

- Location of Schiersfeld within Donnersbergkreis district
- Interactive map of Schiersfeld
- Location within Germany Location within Rhineland-Palatinate
- Coordinates: 49°41′39.45″N 7°45′49.91″E
- Country: Germany
- State: Rhineland-Palatinate
- District: Donnersbergkreis
- Municipal assoc.: Nordpfälzer Land

Government
  - Mayor (2019–24): Ingo Lamb

Area
  - Total: 7.07 km^{2} (2.73 sq mi)
- Elevation: 202 m (663 ft)

Population (2025-12-31)
  - Total: 225
  - Density: 31.8/km^{2} (82.4/sq mi)
- Time zone: UTC+01:00 (CET)
  - Summer (DST): UTC+02:00 (CEST)
- Postal codes: 67823
- Dialling codes: 06362
- Vehicle registration: KIB
- Website: www.schiersfeld.de

Schiersfeld is a municipality in the Donnersbergkreis district, in Rhineland-Palatinate, Germany.
