= Rockenhausen =

- Town
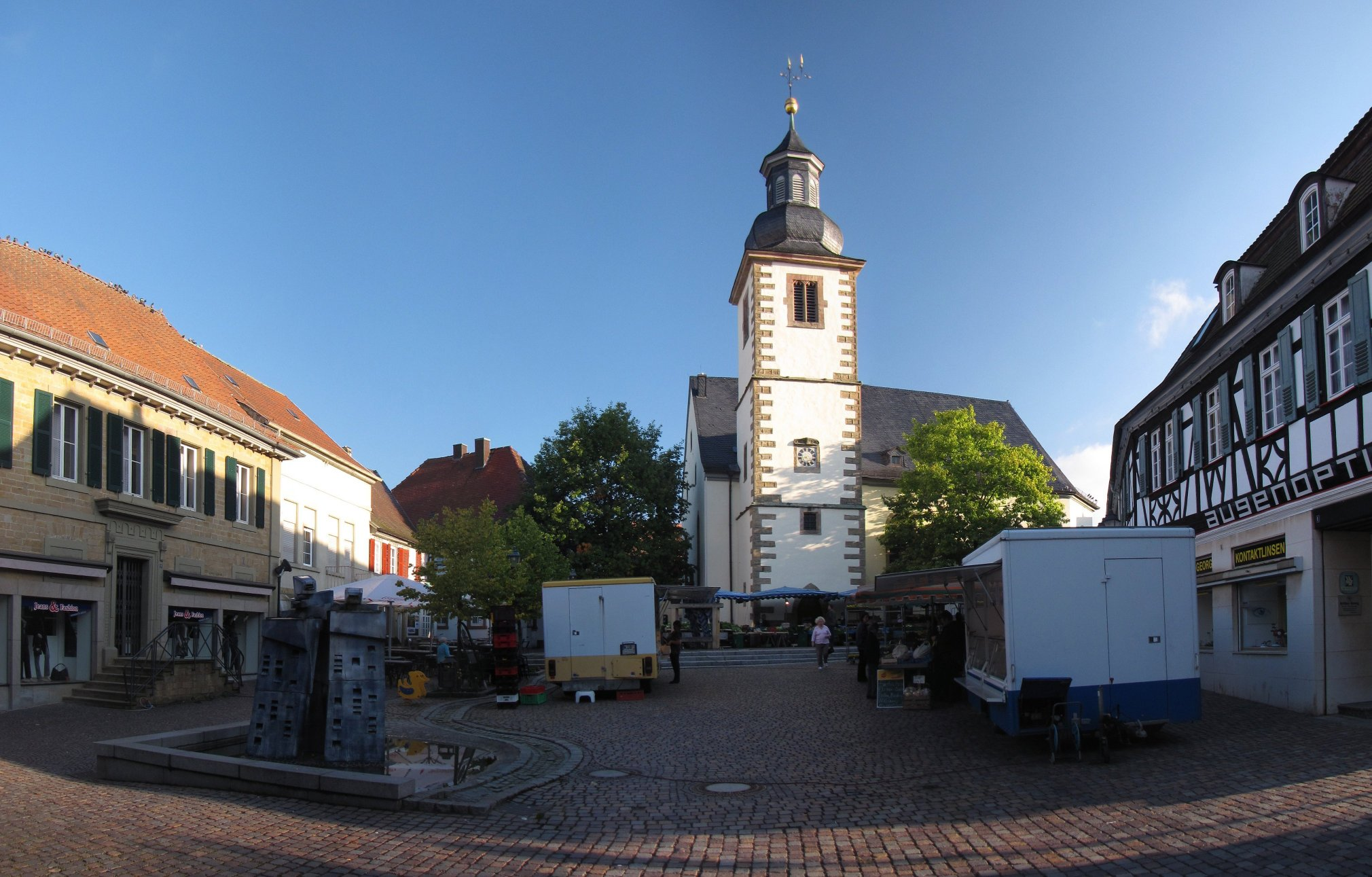
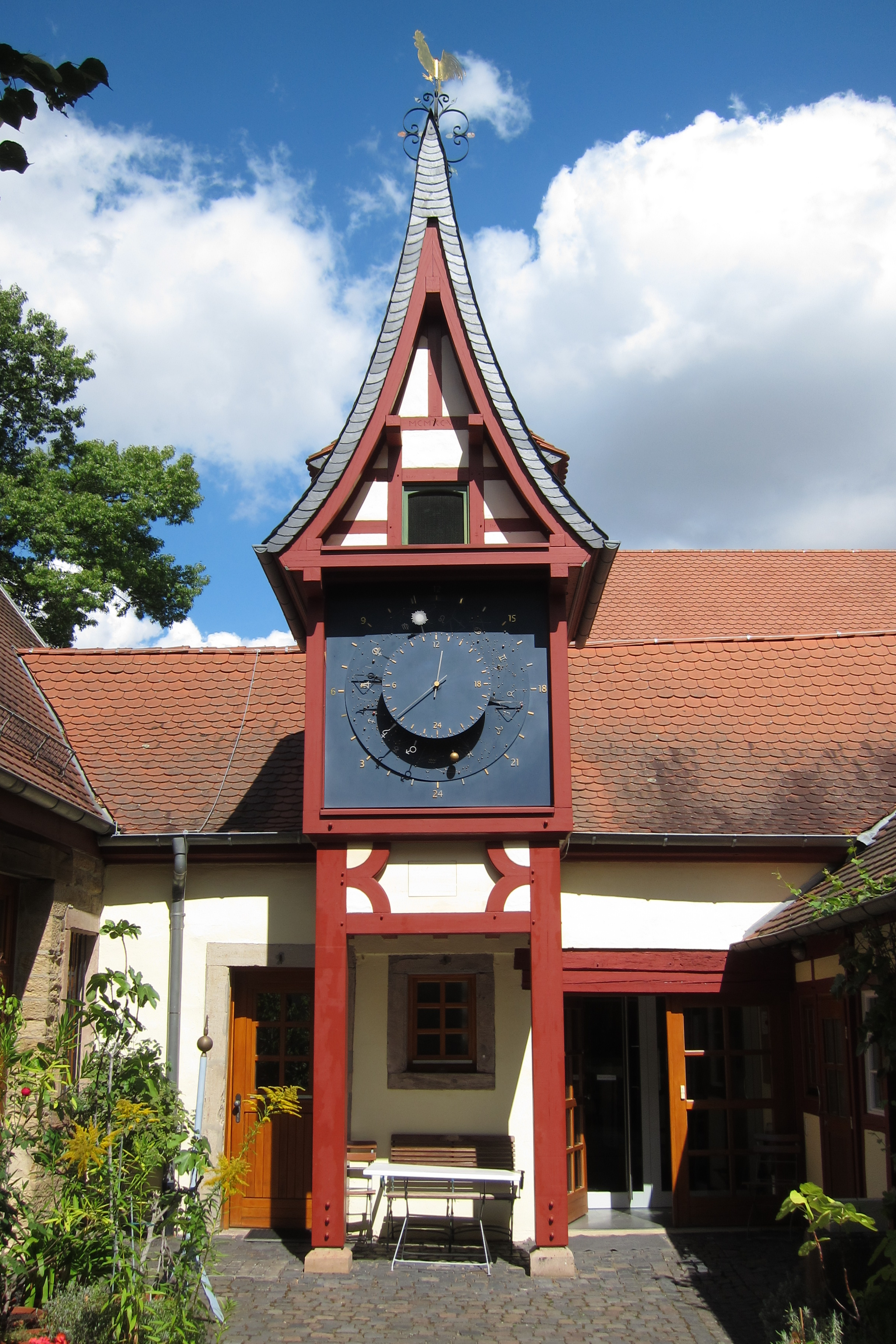
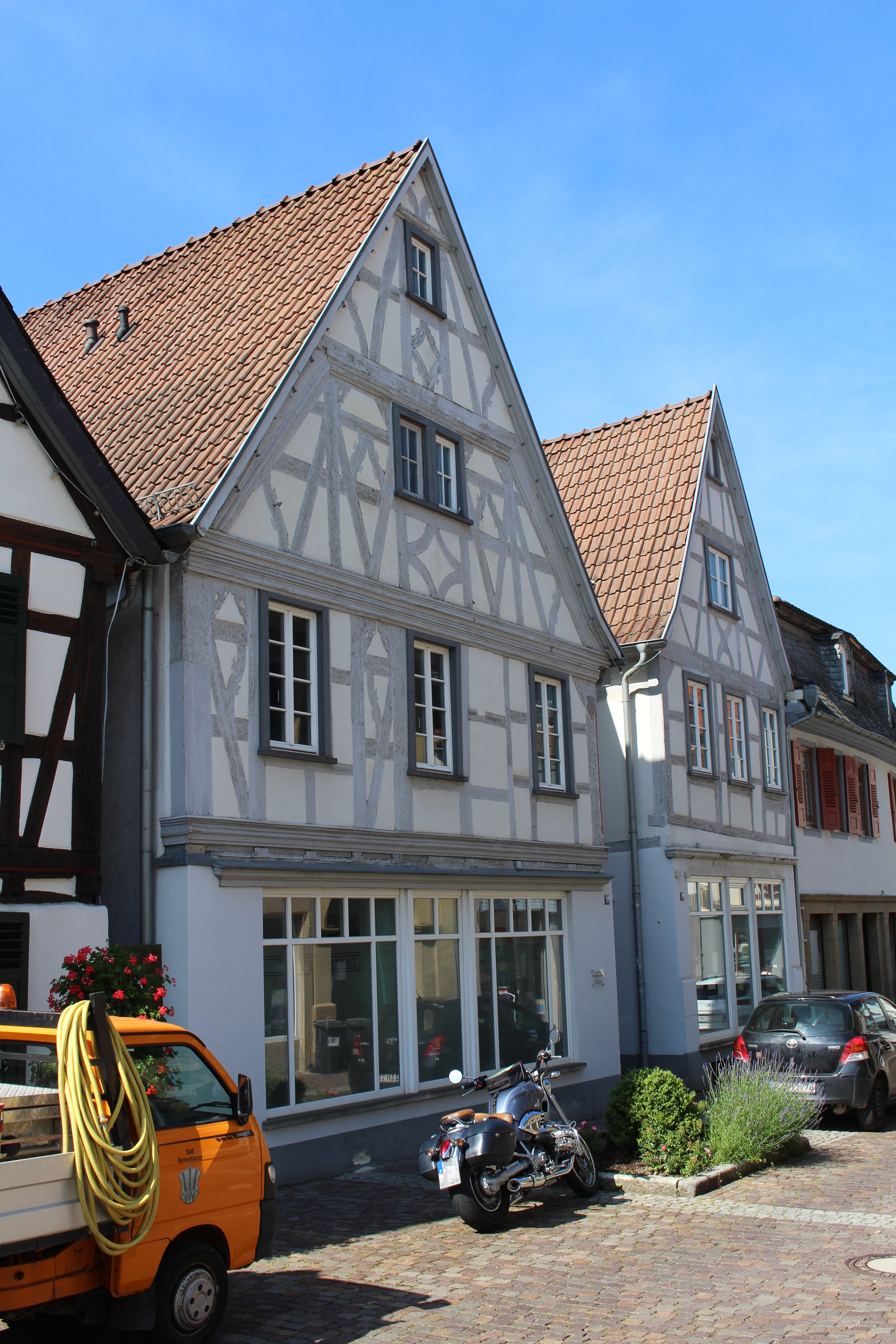
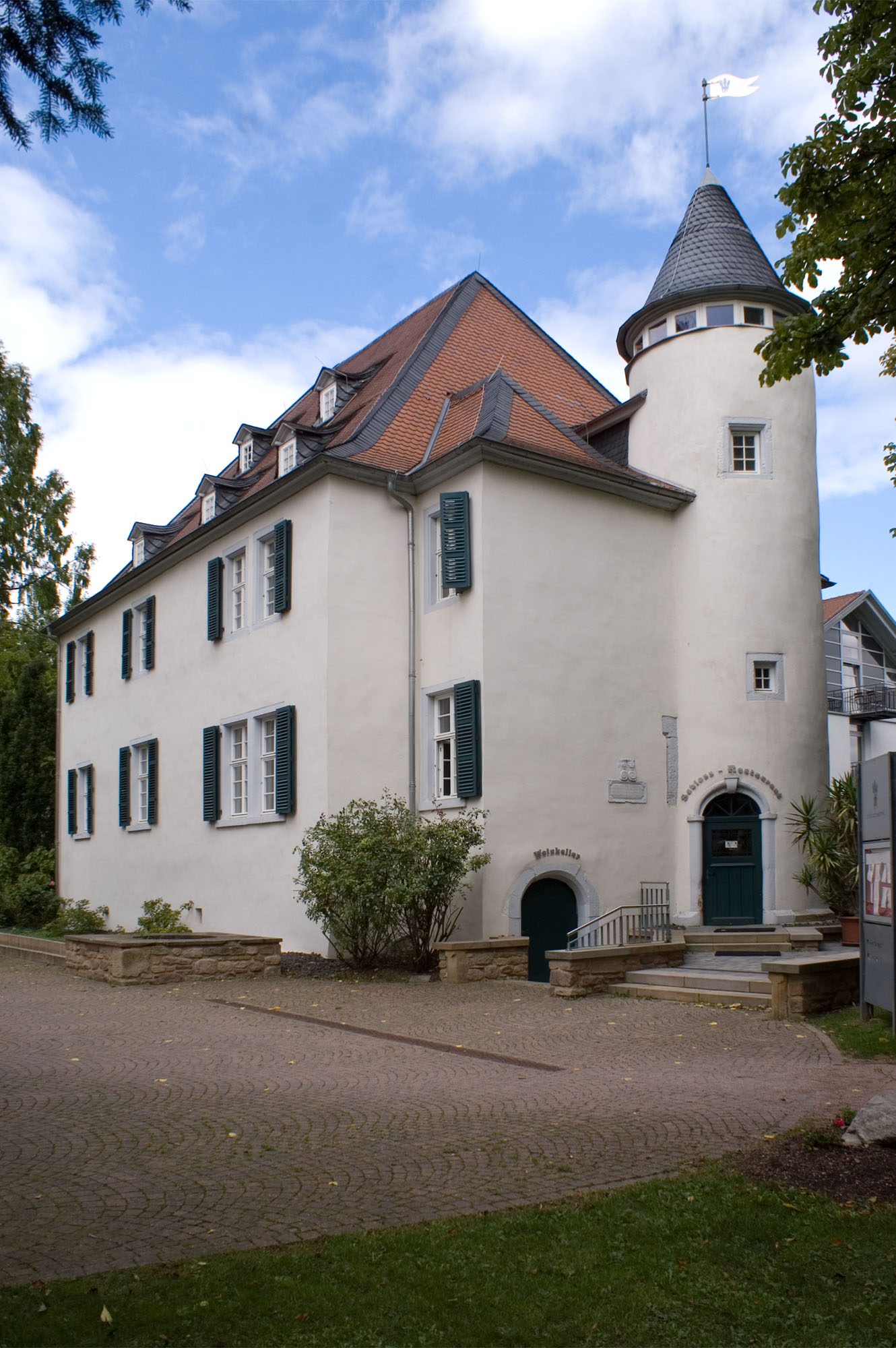
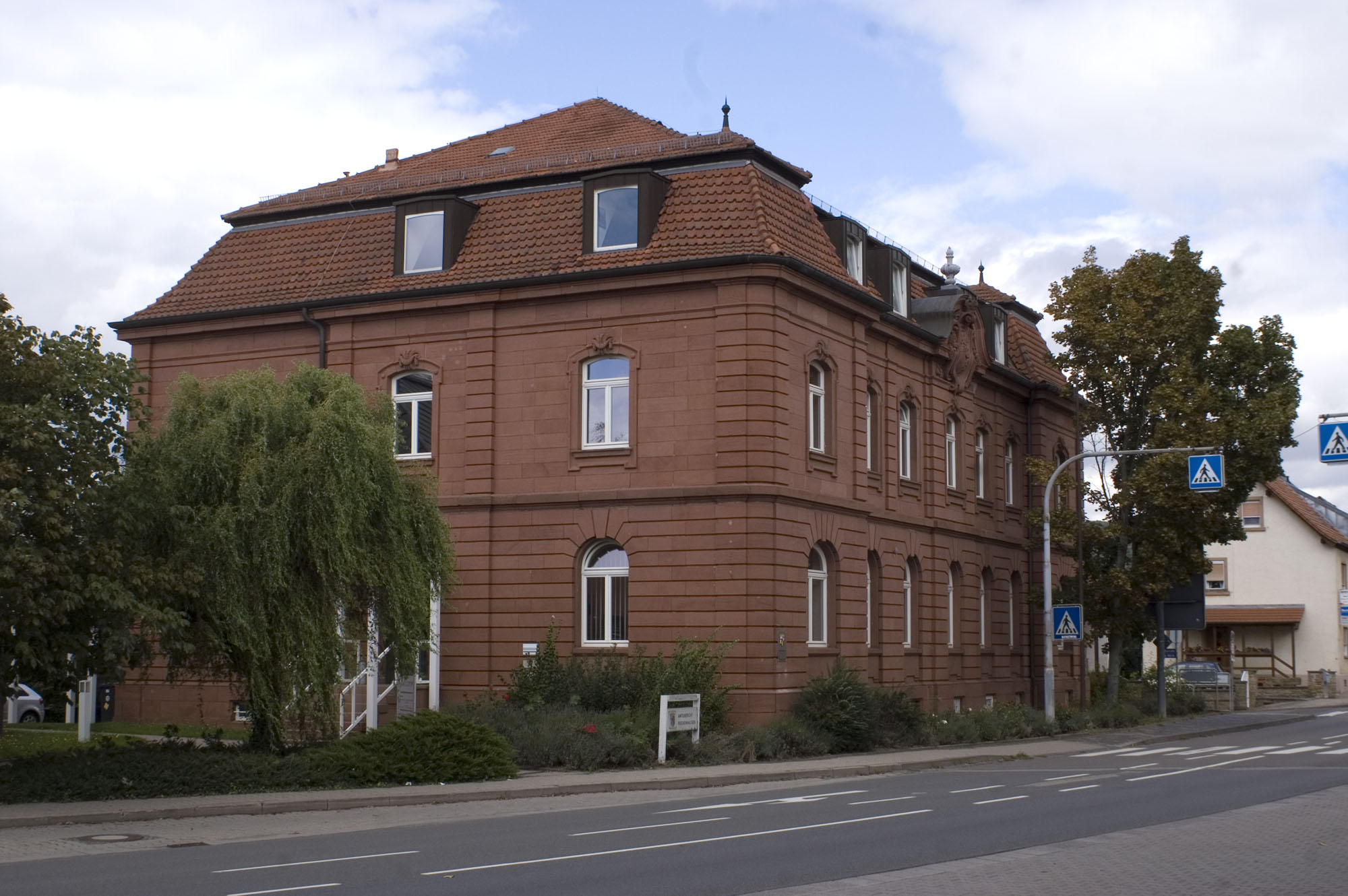
- market square clock museum half-timbered houses Castle courthouse

- Coat of arms

- Location of Rockenhausen within Donnersbergkreis district
- Interactive map of Rockenhausen
- Location within Germany Location within Rhineland-Palatinate
- Coordinates: 49°37′42.91″N 7°49′13.84″E
- Country: Germany
- State: Rhineland-Palatinate
- District: Donnersbergkreis
- Municipal assoc.: Nordpfälzer Land

Government
  - Mayor (2019–24): Michael Vettermann (FDP)

Area
  - Total: 36.83 km^{2} (14.22 sq mi)
- Elevation: 199 m (653 ft)

Population (2025-12-31)
  - Total: 5,311
  - Density: 144.2/km^{2} (373.5/sq mi)
- Time zone: UTC+01:00 (CET)
  - Summer (DST): UTC+02:00 (CEST)
- Postal codes: 67806
- Dialling codes: 06361
- Vehicle registration: ROK, KIB
- Website: www.rockenhausen.de

Rockenhausen (German pronunciation: [ʁɔkn̩ˈhaʊzn̩]) is a town in the Donnersbergkreis, in Rhineland-Palatinate, Germany. It is situated on the river Alsenz, approx. 30 km (19 mi) north of Kaiserslautern.

Rockenhausen is the seat of the Verbandsgemeinde ("collective municipality") Nordpfälzer Land. The town consists the villages Marienthal, Dörnbach, and Rockenhausen itself.

== History ==
Rockenhausen received its town charter in 1332. At that time subordinated to the Raugrafen, the town belonged to the Electoral Palatinate from 1457. During the Thirty Years' War, it was almost completely destroyed, as were almost all other villages in the region.

After 1792 the region was occupied by French troops in the First Revolutionary War and annexed after the peace of Campo Formio (1797). From 1798 to 1814 Rockenhausen belonged to the French department Donnersberg and was the capital (chef-lieu) of the canton Rockenhausen. Due to the agreements made at the Congress of Vienna (1815) and an exchange contract with Austria, the region became part of the Kingdom of Bavaria in 1816. From 1818 Rockenhausen was assigned to the Landkommissariat Kirchheim in the Bavarian Rheinkreis, later to the Bezirksamt Kirchheimbolanden. On 1 December 1900 the district office Rockenhausen was formed from parts of the district offices Kirchheimbolanden and Kaiserslautern. On January 1, 1939, the district office was renamed into the district of Rockenhausen.[4]

After the Second World War, Rockenhausen became part of the newly formed state of Rhineland-Palatinate within the French occupation zone and belonged to the administrative district of Palatinate until 1968.

On 7 June 1969, the district of Rockenhausen was united with the district of Kirchheimbolanden to form today's Donnersberg district. On 10 June 1979, the previously independent municipalities of Dörnbach with 550 inhabitants and Marienthal/Pfalz with 280 inhabitants were incorporated into the town.

== Notable citizens ==
- Uta Frith, DBE, FRS, FBA, FMedSci (born 1941) - developmental psychologist, now resident and professionally active in the United Kingdom.
