= Alsenz =

- Municipality
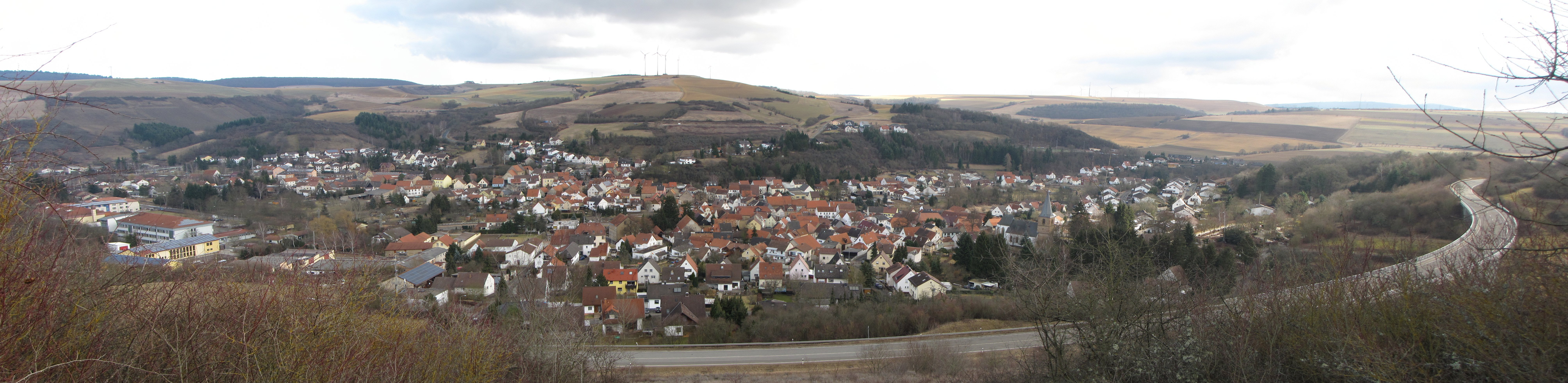

- Coat of arms

- Location of Alsenz within Donnersbergkreis district
- Interactive map of Alsenz
- Location within Germany Location within Rhineland-Palatinate
- Coordinates: 49°43′51″N 7°48′50″E
- Country: Germany
- State: Rhineland-Palatinate
- District: Donnersbergkreis
- Municipal assoc.: Nordpfälzer Land

Government
  - Mayor (2019–24): Michael Rink

Area
  - Total: 12.88 km^{2} (4.97 sq mi)
- Elevation: 224 m (735 ft)

Population (2025-12-31)
  - Total: 1,544
  - Density: 119.9/km^{2} (310.5/sq mi)
- Time zone: UTC+01:00 (CET)
  - Summer (DST): UTC+02:00 (CEST)
- Postal codes: 67821
- Dialling codes: 06362
- Vehicle registration: KIB
- Website: www.alsenz.de

Alsenz (German pronunciation: [ˈalzɛnts]) is a municipality in the Donnersbergkreis district, in Rhineland-Palatinate, Germany. Alsenz has an area of 12.88 km^{2} and a population of 1,647 (as of December 31, 2020).

== Culture and sights ==
In the centre of the village is the Renaissance village hall (Rathaus), built in 1578. The building consists of a bricked lower storey with round arches and timber-framed upper storey.

The Palatine Stonemason Museum, (Pfälzische Steinhauermuseum) the Museum of Local History (Museum für Heimatgeschichte) and the North Palatinate Gallery (Nordpfalzgalerie) also use rooms in the village hall. The Nassau-Weilburg district headquarters (Amtshof), built around 1780, the 1756 former synagogue and the 18th century Protestant church characterise the village scene.

== Notable residents ==
- Wilhelm Frick (1877-1946), Nazi official, executed for war crimes
