= Munsterman =

Munsterman is a surname. Notable people with the surname include:

- Marthe Munsterman (born 1993), Dutch women's footballer
- Scott Munsterman (born 1961), American politician

== See also ==
- Münstermann
