= Reipoltskirchen =

- Municipality
- Coat of arms

- Location of Reipoltskirchen within Kusel district
- Interactive map of Reipoltskirchen
- Location within Germany Location within Rhineland-Palatinate
- Coordinates: 49°38′4.6″N 7°39′42.25″E
- Country: Germany
- State: Rhineland-Palatinate
- District: Kusel
- Municipal assoc.: Lauterecken-Wolfstein

Government
  - Mayor (2019–24): Ernst Eckert

Area
  - Total: 7.49 km^{2} (2.89 sq mi)
- Elevation: 208 m (682 ft)

Population (2025-12-31)
  - Total: 318
  - Density: 42.5/km^{2} (110/sq mi)
- Time zone: UTC+01:00 (CET)
  - Summer (DST): UTC+02:00 (CEST)
- Postal codes: 67753
- Dialling codes: 06364
- Vehicle registration: KUS
- Website: www.reipoltskirchen.de

Reipoltskirchen is an Ortsgemeinde – a municipality belonging to a Verbandsgemeinde, a kind of collective municipality – in the Kusel district in Rhineland-Palatinate, Germany. It belongs to the Verbandsgemeinde Lauterecken-Wolfstein.

== Geography ==
=== Location ===
Reipoltskirchen lies in the Odenbach valley in the north of the North Palatine Uplands at an elevation of some 200 m on a slight broadening of the valley floor. The mountains on either side of the valley climb rather steeply upwards, reaching more than 300 m above sea level on the right (east) bank and more than 400 m above sea level on the left (west) bank (Steinkopf 403.3 m, Platte 361 m, Galgenkopf 303 m). While the Ingweilerhof lies in the dale, along with the main centre, Ausbacherhof and Karlshof are to be found on the heights that stretch out between the Odenbach valley and Lauter valley to the west. The municipal area measures 652 ha, of which roughly 7 ha is settled and 250 ha is wooded.

=== Neighbouring municipalities ===
Reipoltskirchen borders in the north on the municipality of Becherbach, in the northeast on the municipality of Nußbach, in the southeast on the municipality of Hefersweiler, in the south on the municipality of Relsberg, in the southwest on the municipality of Einöllen, in the west on the municipality of Hohenöllen and in the northwest on the municipality of Cronenberg.

=== Constituent communities ===
Reipoltskirchen's Ortsteile are the main centre, likewise called Reipoltskirchen, and the outlying centres of Ausbacherhof, Ingweilerhof and Karlshof.

=== Municipality’s layout ===
Reipoltskirchen's main centre stretches along the left bank of the stream on roads that climb up to the western heights. A few houses in the southeast of the village stand on the far bank and are linked with the village centre by the bridge carrying the Landesstraße 382. The oldest settled neighbourhood lies in the northeast of the village. Standing here are the church and the rectory as well as the old lowland castle of Reipoltskirchen, a water castle which is ringed by the stream and also an artificial watercourse. At the end of this moat also stands the former mill whose waterwheels were driven by water coming out of the moat. The old school and the forester's house likewise stand in this northerly neighbourhood. The graveyard is to be found north of the village between the through road and the brook. Most of the houses come from the 19th century, as does the church. A newer schoolhouse from 1906 stands in the village's south end on Hirtenstraße. Likewise on that street stands the Johann-Heinrich-Roos-Halle, a multipurpose hall. The castle's origins are uncertain. It may have arisen in the late 12th century, but is first recorded in 1267. It was a round complex that was surrounded by the moat and walls on a manmade hill. Still well preserved is the 18 m-tall bergfried with its very thick walls and flat roof. In recent times, the moat has been filled back up with water. For years, the Kusel district has been having extensive renovation work carried out, which is now almost finished. The Ingweilerhof, south of the village, right on the road near the municipal limit with Hefersweiler, was in bygone days a village in its own right. Nowadays it is a great walled rectangle with houses, a chapel and commercial buildings that come from the 18th century. Housed at this estate is a seniors’ home. Likewise formerly a village in its own right was the Ausbacherhof lying southwest of the village on the road to Einöllen. The Karlshof, though, lying near the Hohenöllen municipal area, is a newer centre founded in the 19th century.

== History ==
=== Antiquity ===
Reipoltskirchen was settled quite early on. The latest archaeological find was unearthed one kilometre south of Reipoltskirchen, an old Roman house, that is to say, a villa rustica, believed to have been built between about AD 100 and 200, with its associated stabling and lodging for servants. This villa may have arisen from a foregoing Celtic settlement. In the 6th and 7th centuries, at the time when the Franks, a Germanic tribe, were taking over the land, a Frankish settlement arose in the Odenbach valley roughly where the Nußbach (formerly the Hahnenbach) empties into the Odenbach. It was called Hundheim am Steg.

=== Middle Ages ===
Sometime about 980, a Frank named Richbald built a church about a kilometre northwest of Hundheim am Steg. Over the years, a settlement grew up around it and took the name Richbaldeskirchen, after the man who had built the church. This earliest church is believed to have been wooden, but it was replaced by a sturdier building in the 10th or 11th century. This church had its first documentary mention in 1222 in Prüm Abbey’s book of souls as Kirche mit Leichenhof (“church with graveyard”). The people who settled there cleared land and farmed, although apparently the land did not yield up plentiful harvests.

It is likely that the region around Reipoltskirchen was originally free Imperial Domain (Reichsland). An unknown king or emperor may have transferred the village to Prüm Abbey, which in the 12th century then transferred its holdings in the Reichsland to secular lords as a Vogtei.

Other than Meffridus de Ripoldeskirchen whose name cropped up in a document, no Lords of Reipoltskirchen are known to history. More is known about the families Bolanden and Hohenfels. Werner I of Bolanden, an Imperial ministerialis, founded the Hane Monastery near Bolanden in 1129. Werner II endowed the Rodenkirchen Monastery. Philipp III of Bolanden (d. 1220) had Castle Ehrenfels built on the Rhine. His son Philipp IV wed Elisabeth von Hohenfels, and thenceforth the House of Hohenfels was always seen as a branch of the House of Bolanden. One of Philipp's sons, Dylmann (Theoderich), was Imperial Treasurer and called himself Dylman von Hohenfels. His own son, Heinrich, in turn is held to be the founder of the Reipoltskirchen line. He bore the double title Heinrich von Hohenfels und Herr zu Reipoltskirchen (Heinrich of Hohenfels and Lord at Reipoltskirchen), and he was also known for participating in Emperor Henry VII's journey to Rome.

According to Father Michael Frey's (1788–1854) Beschreibung des Rheinkreises (“Description of the Rheinkreis”, that is, the Palatinate during the time after the Congress of Vienna when it was Bavarian), it was sometime about 1181 that the lowland castle was built. This castle belonged as a fief from Prüm Abbey in the Eifel to the Lords of Bolanden. Known to have been among the earliest Burgmannen are Meffried von Reipoltskirchen (about 1196) and Jakob Boos zu Reipoltskirchen (1209). The castle eventually passed by inheritance to the Lords of Hohenfels, had its first documentary mention in 1276 and beginning in 1297, it became the seat of the lordly sideline founded by Heinrich von Hohenfels, Lord of Reipoltskirchen.

Sometime between 1194 and 1198, or perhaps even as early as 1189/1190, Reipoltskirchen had its first documentary mention in a directory of landholds kept by Count Werner von Bolant, whose family seat – a castle – stood in Bolanden on the Donnersberg. He was Emperor Barbarossa's ministerialis and one of the wealthiest knights of his time. This directory is today kept at the Hessisches Hauptstaatsarchiv in Wiesbaden. In it is found a listing of the extensive and widely scattered fiefs held by Werner, among which is an entry reading “Mefridus de Ripoldeskirchen habet a me in beneficio in Rameswilre V. mansos predii.” The confusion about the date arises from the fact that the directory contains no explicit dates in its text. Complicating matters is the directory's division into four parts, each of which likely dates from a different time. Wilhelm Sauer suggested for the third and most extensive part, which contains the mention of Mefridus de Ripoldeskirchen, the 1194-1198 dates. The authors Martin Dolch and Albrecht Greule concurred with this assessment in their 1991 work Historisches Siedlungsnamenbuch der Pfalz, although writer Albrecht Eckhardt had reckoned its date as something more like 1189/1190 in 1976, with which Volker Rödel later agreed in 1980. The key to pinpointing the date lies in the year when Werner II died. Is the “Werner von Bolanden” mentioned in the records between 1193 and 1198 Werner II or his grandson Werner III (Werner II's son Philipp predeceased his father in 1187)? Whatever the truth is, it seemingly cannot be inferred with any certainty from this old directory (especially since the writing in it suggests that it is a copy of the original from about 1250/1260), but what is certain at least is that 1198 is the latest possible date for this document. Thus, the municipality celebrated its 800th anniversary of first documentary mention in 1998. The Lordship of Reipoltskirchen, which belonged to the Upper Rhenish Circle, remained Imperially immediate until its occupation in 1792 by French Revolutionary troops.

The first “Knight of Reipoltskirchen” to appear in the historical record is Heinrich von Hohenfels und Reipoltskirchen, who was mentioned in 1297, and who died in 1329 and was buried at the Zion Monastery Church (Klosterkirche Sion) in Otterberg. Also in 1297, Count Heinrich sold his uncle, the Count of Zweibrücken, the Urbach estate (Ausbacherhof). The historical record mentions the castle for the first time. In Reipoltskirchen, a new sideline of the Lords of Bolanden took its seat, with Heinrich von Hohenfels as the founder. It was soon afterwards calling itself after its two castles: the Lords of Hohenfels-Reipoltskirchen. In 1304, Count Heinrich bought from the noble knight Johann von Metz the villages of Finkenbach and Breitenborn (Gersweiler) along with the patronage rights at the church there. In 1350, the Hohenfelses came to Reipoltskirchen after their castle seat on the Donnersberg was destroyed. They were forbidden to build their castle anew once they had shown themselves to be robber knights and highwaymen. The line of succession through the Late Middle Ages was Konrad I, Konrad II, Eberhard I, Eberhard II, Johann I and Wolfgang. All but the last bore the title Lord of Reipoltskirchen. Wolfgang also styled himself Lord of Hohenfels, Rixingen and Forbach, which went to show how greatly the lordly house had expanded its holdings. It was about 1500, through marriage, that the Hohenfels-Reipoltskirchens acquired shares of the counties of Forbach and Rixingen in Lorraine. Furthermore, sons had been founding sidelines, but by the Late Middle Ages, only two such lines remained, the Lords of Hohenfels-Reipoltskirchen and the Lords of Falkenstein, and even this latter house died out with Archbishop of Trier Werner von Falkenstein's death in 1418. In 1401, the parish of Reipoltskirchen belonged to the rural chapter of Münsterappel.

=== Modern times ===
Among Wolfgang's (d. 1538) and Katharina von Rappoltstein's issue was Johannes (or Johann) II, who as a young knight led Franz von Sickingen’s army for a time. By exchange in 1553 with Waldgrave-Rhinegrave Philipp Franz von Daun he acquired against the faraway village of Hochstätten in the Alsenz valley the nearer villages of Nußbach and Schönborn, along with a half share in the village of Rudolphskirchen. He further acquired rights to the Hundheimer Hufe (see Vanished villages below) and the village of Seelen in Palatinate-Zweibrücken.

In 1548, the Reformation was introduced into Reipoltskirchen, Rixingen and Forbach by Count Philipp von Leiningen-Westerburg. The neighbouring Duchy of Palatinate-Zweibrücken had already adopted the new belief in 1546.

Between 1560 and 1570, the Reformation was introduced into Reipoltskirchen, presumably by Count Johann II von Hohenfels-Reipoltskirchen (1538–1568). In 1600, a Protestant clergyman is mentioned. Johann II's son Wolfgang Philipp outlived him by only eight years. Wolfgang Philipp's wife Amalia remarried, and her new husband was Count Philipp I of Leiningen-Westerburg, who now became his stepson's regent. Philipp saw to it that the Reformation was introduced into all his own and his wife's holdings. As for the stepson, Johann III von Hohenfels-Reipoltskirchen, for whom Philipp had acted as regent, he took power upon his stepfather's death in 1597 and was the last in his noble line (Imperial ministerial family of the Lords of Bolanden), and died in Forbach in 1602 childless and unwed. He was only 25 years old. The sole heir was Countess Amalia at Leiningen-Westerburg, born Countess at Falkenstein. The shares in the counties of Forbach and Rixingen were soon lost. On 25 October 1608 Countess Amalia died at the age of 62 and was buried in the Reipoltskirchen church. An artistically worked tomb is to be found in the sacristy. In 1603, Amalia bequeathed the Lordship of Reipoltskirchen to her two brothers Sebastian and Emich von Falkenstein, who both died heirless, the former in 1619 and the latter in 1628. So instead, under the terms of her will, her sister Sydonia's (also called Sidonie) two sons, Johann Casimir and Steino von Löwenhaupt, inherited the estate, and also the County of Falkenstein. The Lordship of Reipoltskirchen was thus sundered, with the elder brother bequeathing his half to his sons Ludwig Wirich and Karl Moritz, who would then each hold one fourth of the Lordship, thereby splitting it into three pieces. Steino von Löwenhaupt's daughter Elisabeth Amalie wed Count Philipp von Manderscheid, thereby giving the House of Manderscheid ownership rights to Reipoltskirchen. Ludwig Wirich von Löwenhaupt's share of the Lordship remained whole and in his family's ownership until his grandsons Nils von Löwenhaupt (1708–1776) and Kasimir von Löwenhaupt shared it. In Karl Moritz's line, one fourth of the Lordship was split among three grandsons, Karl Emil, Franz Königsmann and Gustav Otto. These three brothers first pledged this holding to one of their officials, and then later, in 1722, sold it to a count, Franz Wilhelm Kaspar Baron of Hillesheim (d. 1748). He was a high official to the Elector Palatine and lived in Mannheim. Nils and Kasimir at first kept ownership of their thirds.

Sydonia's younger son Steino bequeathed his half by way of his daughter Elisabeth Amalie to the Lordship of Manderscheid, who kept it until 1730, when Wolfgang Heinrich Count at Manderscheid and Blankenheim, Baron at Hohenfels and Reipoltskirchen and Lord at Keyl sold the half share for a price of 30,500 Rhenish guilders, likewise to the Counts of Hillesheim, who thus had acquired three fourths of the original Lordship. Meanwhile, Nils and Kasimir from the older line of Löwenhaupt sued to get the fourth of Hillesheim, which had been sold by the younger line, back. They won the case, although not until 1754, six years after the Baron of Hillesheim had died. The count's widow, a born countess of Gleichen and Hatzfeld, had to give the fourth from the Löwenhaupt line back. Thus, there were once again two parts of the old Lordship of Reipoltskirchen, one half held by the brothers Nils and Kasimir of Löwenhaupt and the other by the widow Hillesheim.

In 1618, the Thirty Years' War broke out; by the time it was over in 1648, the whole land had been laid waste, and there were almost no inhabitants left in it. In 1628, both through a failure of the House of Manderscheid to produce a male heir and by marriage, Reipoltskirchen became subject to an administrative arrangement called an Erbgemeinschaft or a Ganerbschaft. This meant that the Lords of Manderscheid-Keil and the Counts of Löwenhaupt-Rasburg each held a share in the lordship and ruled the estate jointly as a kind of joint inheritance. In the midst of the Thirty Years' War, on Michaelmas (29 September) 1631, Johann Heinrich Roos, later to be a prominent painter, was christened in Reipoltskirchen. However, as to whether he was actually born there, this is unclear (his birthplace is usually given as Otterberg). Nonetheless, his marriage certificate, made out in Sankt Goar in 1656, states that he was von Reuppelskirchen in der Pfalz bürttig (born in Reuppelskirchen in the Palatinate).

In 1670, there was a dispute with Electoral Mainz over feudal rights in the Rhenish-Hessian villages of Marienborn (today an outlying centre of Mainz), Mommenheim and Lörzweiler, which belonged to Reipoltskirchen.

From 1681 to 1697, Reipoltskirchen belonged to the French Saar Province. In 1683, the Duchy of Palatinate-Zweibrücken passed by way of inheritance to the royal house of Sweden, and when French rule ended in Reipoltskirchen, it found itself under Swedish administration until 1718.

In 1720, there was a simultaneum at the local church, with Protestants and Catholics both worshipping at the same church. The Protestant minister was Johann Jakob Böhmer, while Catholic services were held by the Franciscan Father Hermann Vollmer from Mannheim.

In 1722, the Imperial Count of Hillesheim bought a one-fourth share of the lordship over Reipoltskirchen from the Counts of Löwenhaupt. This deed was overturned by the Reichskammergericht, although the actual reversal of the deed did not take place until 1754. The Count of Hillesheim, though, evidently did not give up his ambition to have a share of the Reipoltskirchen lordship, for in 1730, he bought a one-half share of the lordship from the holdings of the Counts of Manderscheid. The Hillesheims held this share until the French Revolution. The ecclesiastical arrangements were altered by the Count of Hillesheim. A Catholic parish was established in Reipoltskirchen, and made subject to the Archbishopric of Mainz. Protestant-Lutheran parishes were set up in Finkenbach, Rathskirchen and Rudolphskirchen (today an outlying centre of Rathskirchen). On 11 October 1748, Count Willhelm von Hillesheim died in Reipoltskirchen. After his death, an extensive overhaul of the lordship arrangements was negotiated between Löwenhaupt and Hillesheim. This agreement was approved by the Emperor on 21 March 1754. In 1761, there arose disputes with the Duchy of Palatinate-Zweibrücken over tithes, compulsory labour, taxes and Wildfangrecht (a system under which a feudal lord could incorporate any “stray” person in his domain into the ranks of his subjects if he or she could not demonstrate allegiance to another lord). Although the Reichskammergericht in Wetzlar ruled in Reipoltskirchen's favour in the case of its grievance, the great Duchy kept on doing with the dwarf state of Reipoltskirchen whatever it deemed fit. On 28 November 1763, the Löwenhaupts sold their share in Reipoltskirchen to Imperial Count Philipp Andreas Ellrodt (or Andreas Philipp von Ellrath, later Ellroth, b. 1707; d. 1 January 1767), a high official in Bayreuth (where Count Nils was likewise in state service), for 140,000 Gulden. Kasimir received 60,000 Gulden of this total while his brother Nils drew a yearly income of 3,000 Gulden from the other 80,000 Gulden. The deed was even prefaced with an exact description of the Lordship of Reipoltskirchen, which said in part: Die Reichsherrschaft Reipoltskirchen steht mit dem hochgräflichen Haus von Hillesheim in gleicher Gemeinschaft, liegt zwischen den hochfürstlich - zweibrückischen und kurfürstlich - pfälzischen Ländern und hat ihr eigenes, meistensteils in einem Reich fortgehendes Territorium. (“The Imperial Lordship of Reipoltskirchen stands with the high comital House of Hillesheim in the same community, lies between the high princely land of Zweibrücken and the Electoral-Palatine land and has its own, mostly continuous territory.”). At the same time, Nils von Löwenhaupt's daughter, Wilhelmine, wed the buyer Andreas Philipp von Ellrath's son, who was also a state minister in Bayreuth, but he died not long afterwards, in 1765. Wilhelmine then married a Dr. Johannes Nikolaus von Mader, thereby losing her ownership rights to Reipoltskirchen. By that time, though, the elder Ellrath had run into financial trouble anyway, and in 1770, he sold his share in the Lordship of Reipoltskirchen for 76,000 Gulden to the County Palatine of Zweibrücken, then ruled by Duke Christian IV. This sale was, however, overturned by a ruling at the Hofgericht – a high lordly court – in Vienna after the Countess of Hillesheim (d. 1773) raised objections. So, Ellrath got this share back after the Countess's death, in 1776, prompting him to put it straight back on the market and seek a new buyer.

A state official named Baron Ludwig von Esebeck (lord of the Ingweiler castle estate), working as an agent representing another, made himself known, and through him, the Löwenhaupt share of Reipoltskirchen passed in 1777 to a countess named Karoline von Isenburg. Also known as Karoline Franziska Dorothea von Parkstein, she was a natural daughter of Karl Theodor, the last Elector Palatine and Duke of Bavaria. She came to an agreement with the joint owner, the Countess of Hillesheim. The purchase agreement was approved by Karoline's father on 1 February 1778, thus ending the Ellrodts’ ownership of any share of Reipoltskirchen. While the Ellrodts were part-owners of Reipoltskirchen, a number of Protestant families from France (Huguenots) had made their home in the village. The Countess of Hillesheim transferred her share to her son, Imperial Count Ernst Gottfried, Baron of Reipoltskirchen and Hillesheim, who on 9 May 1785, died unmarried. His heirs were his two sisters, younger sister Countess Charlotte of Hillesheim – likewise unwed – and elder sister Countess Elisabeth Auguste of Hillesheim, who was married, to a Count of Spee, a high Electoral Palatinate official. The condominium was now held by three women; the third one was Princess Karoline. This arrangement remained unchanged until the fall of the old feudal system in the French Revolution.

Belonging to the lordship towards the end of its existence were the following villages: Reipoltskirchen, Nußbach, Rathskirchen, Reichsthal, Hefersweiler, Relsberg and Morbach, along with a half share of an enclosed area at Rudolphskirchen and the scattered holdings of Finkenbach-Gersweiler, Schönborn and Dörnbach. All these villages jointly belonged to the owners of Hillesheim and the Countess of Isenburg. Belonging to the Countess of Isenburg alone were the bought villages of Seelen, Berzweiler, Niederkirchen and the other half share of Rudolphskirchen.

==== Recent times ====
French Revolutionary troops spared Reipoltskirchen and its castle any destruction. On 3 March 1793, they marched into the village. On 6 March, they planted a Freedom Tree in the village, and then made the villagers pay contributions when this symbol of the French Revolution was damaged. On 24 April, the Isenburg Amtmann, Wilhelm Stern, reported to the Princely Estate Administration in Mannheim that the French had forced the subjects to take a vow to freedom and equality. In 1797, with the beginning of French administration, the Glan became a border river and Reipoltskirchen found itself in the Department of Mont-Tonnerre (or Donnersberg in German), the Arrondissement of Kaiserslautern, the Canton of Lauterecken and the Mairie (“Mayoralty”) of Odenbach. The first French commissioner general, a man from Alsace named Rudler, took office on 4 September. In 1798, he promulgated a law abolishing feudalism, along with all the payments, compulsory labour and tithes that hitherto had been every subject's burden, owed to the lord and the church in the Palatinate. The first Adjunct responsible for Reipoltskirchen was Michael Konrad from Nußbach. As of 26 May 1798, the terms of the Directorial constitution that applied in France were introduced. On 16 June 1799 (27 Prairial in the year VI of the Revolution), all lordly and ecclesiastical holdings were declared national property of the new state, and all the old feudal lordships were dissolved. This meant the end for the Lordship of Reipoltskirchen, too. Now that the castle stood empty, poor people sought shelter there. Others used it as a stone quarry. Auctions were held on 20 March 1805, 30 November and 29 December 1808 and 29 April 1813 to sell these formerly lordly properties off. In 1805, a few buildings formerly held by the house of Isenburg passed to Falciola from Lauterecken. In 1808, the Amtshaus with its tower and some outbuildings went to Charles Baumann from Lauterecken, Henry Puricelli from Meisenheim, and Jean de Hoeffersweiler and Michael Seligmann from Kreuznach. The last Isenburg holding came under the hammer in 1813 and went to Bernhard Jacob Reinach from Mainz. By and by, the buyers then sold the properties that they had acquired to various interested parties, earning a healthy profit. The Treaty of Lunéville was signed on 9 February 1801, under whose terms all lands on the Rhine’s left bank had to be ceded to France. At about this time, Reipoltskirchen had 220 inhabitants.

There was a small Jewish community in the village in 1808, consisting of ten families and all together 56 persons. It likely formed in the 18th century under the comparatively liberal residency requirements that were then customary in smaller lordships. Particularly worthy of mention is the family Grünebaum, from whose midst arose the scholar Dr. Elias Grünebaum, who for many years was the Regional Palatine Rabbi (1836–1893). in 1809, Reipoltskirchen passed to the Mairie of Becherbach.

After Napoleonic times ended, locally in 1814 when the Prussians and Russians drove the French out, Reipoltskirchen and the rest of the Palatinate on the Rhine’s left bank passed under the terms of the Congress of Vienna to the Kingdom of Bavaria along with the rest of the Palatinate. Within the kingdom it belonged to the Landkommissariat (district) and Canton of Kusel, and to the Bürgermeisterei (“mayoralty”) of Becherbach, although about 1895, after the onset of Imperial times, it acquired its own mayoral office. Reipoltskirchen remained in Bavaria until the end of the Second World War.

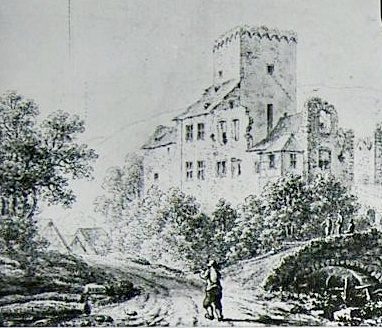
Peter Gayer's sepia drawing of the castle ruin, the earliest picture known of the complex

About 1830, the painter Peter Gayer completed a sepia drawing of the castle ruin, the earliest picture known of the complex, which now gives the modern viewer an idea of the condition in which the old moated castle found itself at that time: the two-floor Amtshaus has already collapsed in part; of the main gate with its drawbridge nothing is left. In the original cadastral survey of Reipoltskirchen in 1845, the castle is described as being under private ownership: Der ehemalige Schlossturm, bestehend in einem Wohnzimmer, Keller, Stall und Hofraum (“The former castle tower, consisting of a livingroom, cellar, stable and courtyard”).

A schoolhouse was built up from the church in 1836. The church itself was torn down owing to its state of disrepair and replaced with a new one in 1847 and 1848. Given the dearth of funds for the project, the parishioners had to forgo a tower and a sacristy. The new church was consecrated on 8 August 1849. In 1858, the church was furnished with an organ. It turned out by 1876, though, that the building work done on the church had been somewhat less than flawless, and it was already falling into such disrepair that it had to be closed. On 11 July 1878, the foundation stone for the church that still stands today was laid. Consecration came on 17 June 1880. At the same time, the old rectory was replaced with the one that still stands today.

In 1883, the Lautertalbahn (railway) opened. The old tithe barn at the castle was torn down in 1884. On 12 March 1891, on the occasion of Prince Regent of Bavaria Luitpold's 70th birthday, a village limetree was planted.

The 1836 school building, which also housed the teachers’ dwellings, had become antiquated and too small by 1907, and so it was decided that a new school building was needed. The old schoolrooms were converted to dwelling space and the new school building was built on a plot of municipal land called “Hirtengarten” in 1908. It was a school building that was typical for its time, built of sandstone with four floors. The ground floor was to house the Protestant school while a small sideroom was to house the mayor's office. On the next floor up were not only the Catholic school but also a storage and archive room for the municipal office. On the top floor, a bell frame with a small bell and a tower was installed. The Protestants were allowed to use the bell in their worship, and the upper school room was also made available to them for church services.

The 1920s were a bad time for all Germany. For instance, the rampant inflation that characterized Weimar Germany at this time led to a six-pound (3 kg) loaf of bread costing more than 18,000,000,000 marks. On 6 November 1923, a 30-man force of separatists favouring the annexation of the Palatinate to France invaded Reipoltskirchen. In 1924, Reipoltskirchen was connected to the electrical grid of Pfalzwerke AG. A watermain followed on 14 October 1928. On 4 February 1927, the Ministry of State for the Interior in Munich gave its approval for the municipality of Reipoltskirchen to bear the arms once borne by the lordship of Hohenfels-Reipoltskirchen (see Coat of arms below).

On 19 March 1945, United States troops marched into Reipoltskirchen; a local mill owner was installed as mayor. Alois Moog was elected mayor in the first mayoral election after the Second World War on 15 September 1946. That same year, Reipoltskirchen became part of the then newly founded state of Rhineland-Palatinate. Despite it being the Americans who had marched into the village, Reipoltskirchen soon afterwards found itself in the French zone of occupation, and until 1955, it was subject to the Gouvernement Militaire Français in the wake of the unconditional surrender by the Third Reich.

In the course of the 1968 administrative restructuring in Rhineland-Palatinate, Reipoltskirchen was grouped into the Verbandsgemeinde of Wolfstein in 1971 as an Ortsgemeinde. In 1977, Reipoltskirchen had 477 inhabitants.

In 1982 and 1983, the castle complex was taken over by the district and placed under monumental protection. At the same time, the Weber Franz and Süß Franz houses were acquired. The Klein-Weißmann house was bought from the district in 1988. Until then, the district had invested a great deal and acquired several private houses in the castle area. In 1983, the former schoolhouse, too, was placed under monumental protection.

In 1986 the Glantalbahn (railway) was closed. In 1996, the castle's moat was partly reconstructed by the district. On 21 March 1998, the now almost dead village limetree was felled and on the occasion of the 800th anniversary of first documentary mention, was replaced with a new tree.

=== Population development ===
While in earlier times the greater part of Reipoltskirchen's population earned their livelihoods at agriculture, shifts in economic structure, particularly after the Second World War, have led to only one in five villagers still working the land. The greater part of the workforce must now commute to work, mainly to Kaiserslautern, Wolfstein and Lauterecken. However, even earlier than the war, there had been job opportunities in fields other than farming, such as craft occupations, work in stone quarries and mines and in the service of the resident lordship. Apparently, many Jews were employed in the feudal administration, for at the time when the lordly houses were auctioned off in the time of the French First Republic, they were occupied to a great extent by Jewish inhabitants. Although 19 Jews were registered in Reipoltskirchen in 1825, only a few years earlier, there may have been more than twice as many living in the village. Today, Jews no longer live in Reipoltskirchen. The shares of the population held by Catholics and Protestants are 55% and 40% respectively.

The following table shows population development over the centuries for Reipoltskirchen, with some figures broken down by religious denomination:

Year	1802	1825	1835	1871	1905	1939	1961	1998	2008
Total	284	342	430	469	406	436	489	409	384
Catholic		198					274
Evangelical		119					215
Jewish		18					–

=== Municipality’s name ===
At its appearance in the village's first documentary mention in the Bolant directory of fiefs towards the end of the 12th century, the name took the form Ripoldeskirchen, one that with only slight changes (Ripolteskirchen, Ripoldiskirchen) persisted until the mid 14th century. Then, the elision of the unstressed E in Ripoldes— began appearing in records as the predominant form, although it had been cropping up here and there since the mid 13th century. Thus, beginning about 1350, the forms Ripoltzkirchen and Rypolßkirchen were predominant. More significant, though, was the shift from the long I in the first (stressed) syllable (IPA: [iː] – pronounced like the “ee” in “cheese”) to a diphthong (IPA: [aɪ] – closer to the “i” in “wine”). This was part of a sound-shift process that affected the German language as a whole, spreading from the east towards the end of the 15th century and gradually making its way across the Rhine into the Palatinate. Since 1497, the village's name has taken its current spoken form (namely IPA: [ˈʁaɪpɔltskɪʁçən]), although there have been variant spellings.

There is no great puzzle as to the name's meaning. The ending —kirchen obviously comes from the root of the German word Kirche (“church”; Old High German Kirihha or Kirihhum in the dative singular; Middle High German Kirche or Kirchen in the dative singular). Also, the first part of the name is clearly a German personal name (Ricbald, Richbald, Richbold, etc.), but one that is no longer customary in Germany. It is known, however, that the name was quite widespread in German-speaking areas in the Middle Ages, and indeed, Reipoltskirchen is not the only example of this name cropping up as part of a placename. Such names appear in such widely scattered places as the Lüneburg Heath, Lower Hesse, the Allgäu and Upper Bavaria. The last named even has a place called Rappoltskirchen (an outlying centre of Fraunberg in Erding district), which except for a difference in the vowel shift that the name underwent corresponds exactly to “Reipoltskirchen”. The Bavarian place's name appears as early as the 9th century in the form Rihpoldeschirihon.

The municipality's name thus means nothing less than “At Reipolt’s Church”, Reipolt (Richbald) being the founder of this church (or perhaps the original owner). What is missing, though, is any great deal of information about this Richbald. More knowledge might lead to a better reckoning of Reipoltskirchen's actual time of founding. Beyond archaeology, only research into placenames could help with that. In Germany, the form of a placename is often a clue to how old the name is. What is known, for instance, is that the Odenbach valley was still being settled in the time after the Migration Period, between about 600 and 750. This can be deduced from the great number of places in the area with names ending in —weiler, a characteristic placename ending of that time, originally used to designate a single homestead (as a standalone word, it now means “hamlet” in German). Local examples are Ginsweiler, Ingweiler, Berzweiler and Hefersweiler, and the ending would indicate that they must be older than Reipoltskirchen (although admittedly they are mentioned only later in the written record).

In the late 12th century, the name Meffridus de Ripoldeskirchen cropped up in a document. Other forms of the village's name that have appeared in documents over time are Ripoldeskirchen (1200), Ribolskirchin (1259), Ripoldiskirchen (1297), Ropelskirchen and Ripoltzkirchen (late 14th century). The current form of the name is known to have appeared as early as 1824.

Ausbach was called Ußbruck in 1437 (according to Goswin Widder) and in 1446 Ußbach. The ending —bruck in the 1437 name form might mean that there was a bridge (German: Brücke) crossing the Ausbach here at the time. The current name Ausbacher Hof first appears in the late 16th century in the phrase im Auspacher Hoffe. According to researchers Dolch and Greule, this was a settlement on a brook (German: Bach) founded by a man named Udsa. Ingweiler had its first documentary mention in 1339 as Ingemudewilre. Other forms of the centre's name that have appeared in documents over time are Engelmorsweiler (no year), Wingewilr (1376), Ingwilre (1426), Ingwyler (1514), Schloss Ingweiler (1761) and Ingweilerhof (1824). Dolch and Greule believe that this centre may have been named after a woman named Engilmuot.

=== Vanished villages ===
To Reipoltskirchen's southeast once lay an estate named Hundheim (or Hundheim am Steg), not to be confused with the still existent Offenbach-Hundheim. It was the seat of a Hun or Hund, as it was customary to call an Untervogt in the Middle Ages. There are other relationships that lead researchers to believe that Reipoltskirchen was once such an official's seat. It is likely that the estate lay right near the village in the south, just across the Odenbach. Documentary mentions have included the following: in 1468 Hontheymer Gericht (Gericht means “lawcourt”); in 1514 zu Hondheim ym stege zu Rypelskirchen (“at Hundheim am Steg at Reipoltskirchen”); in 1553 Huntheymer hubzinß (“Hundheim oxgang levy”). After the Thirty Years' War, the name only ever cropped up in rural cadastral toponyms. The former villages of Ingweiler and Ausbach – now Ingweilerhof and Ausbacherhof – might also be considered vanished villages of a kind.

== Religion ==
Reipoltskirchen originally belonged to the Glan chapter within the Archbishopric of Mainz, even though during the Early and High Middle Ages it could have been held by Prüm Abbey in the Eifel. It could be that the church, which was already standing, was the hub of a major parish, whose extent is no longer known today. It was likely under Johannes II of Hohenfels-Reipoltskirchen that the subjects converted to Protestantism. Philipp I of Westerburg-Leiningen, too, Countess Amalie's second husband, introduced Lutheran belief into all his holdings. Countess Amalie (or Amalia), whose epitaph can still be seen today at the village's Catholic church, was likewise Protestant. The inscription, in archaic German, reads as follows: Allhier liegt begraben Die wohlgeborene Fruw, Frauw Amalia Gräfin zu Leiningen Und Fruw zu Reypoltskirch geborene Falkenstein. Wolselige so geborn den 26ten Septemb. 1547. Undt allhier zu Gott selliglich entschlaffe den 25. Octob. anno 1608 (“Here lies buried the well-born woman Lady Amalia, Countess at Leiningen and Lady at Reipoltskirchen, born Falkenstein. The departed thus born on 26 September 1547. And here blessedly passed away on 25 October 1608”). Very soon after the Thirty Years' War, which heavily decimated Reipoltskirchen's (and many other villages’) population, Catholic Christians were once again allowed to settle in the village. This was further promoted by the French during King Louis XIV's wars of conquest and by lordships later in feudal times. There were soon more Catholics in Reipoltskirchen than Protestants. In the late 17th century, the village church passed into Catholic ownership, and Franciscan friars from Meisenheim provided church services. This church was surely simultaneous, for when a new church building arose in 1848, the Protestants also demanded their rights. They later belonged to the church community of Rathskirchen, with whom they joined forces when it came time to build a new church in 1908. As of 1930, however, they belonged to the Evangelical community of Nußbach. About the middle of the 19th century, ten Mennonites were also counted among Reipoltskirchen's population. The Roman Catholic community was autonomous for a long time, but as of 1975 it was tended by Lauterecken and in 2012 was united with it. In the 19th century, there was also a rather big Jewish community. The old church building, which dated from the Middle Ages, had fallen into disrepair by the early 19th century, and in 1847 and 1848, it was replaced with a new one, but even this had fallen into such disrepair by 1878 that it had to be torn down. The next church, which still stands now, is a hall church with a west tower built onto it.

== Politics ==
=== Municipal council ===
The council is made up of 8 council members, who were elected by majority vote at the municipal election held on 7 June 2009, and the honorary mayor as chairwoman.

=== Mayor ===
Reipoltskirchen's mayor is Ernst Eckert.

=== Coat of arms ===
The German blazon reads: Im geteilten Wappenschild oben ein silbernes Rad auf blauem Grund und unten ein gestürzter silberner Anker, begleitet von zehn silbernen Schindeln auf grünem Grund.

The municipality's arms might in English heraldic language be described thus: Per fess azure a wheel spoked of six argent and vert semé of ten billets an anchor reversed, all of the second.

The two charges, the wheel and the anchor, are drawn from arms once borne by the local lords, the Falkensteins and the Hohenfelses

The Lords of Bolanden stood as Imperial ministeriales in the service of the ecclesiastical Electorate of Mainz, whose coat of arms bore a silver wheel on a red field. As Mainz vassals, they used the same arms, but in different tinctures, with a red wheel on a gold field. Their successors, the Falkensteins and the Hohenfelses, originally bore the Bolanden wheel in their arms, but in different tinctures once again, namely a silver wheel on a blue field. Later the Hohenfelses bore gold cloverleaves. The newer line of Hohenfels-Reipoltskirchen also bore a silver wheel on the helm. Only after the older Hohenfels line died out in 1415 did the local lords adopt the arms that they had borne until now as the noble family's arms, which since 1290 had borne, instead of the wheel, an anchor “reversed” (that is, upside down to the way it usually appears in heraldry) on a green field scattered with gold “billets”. Until the Hohenfels-Reipoltskirchens died out in 1602, the arms were quarterly with the silver wheel on blue in the first and fourth fields and the silver anchor with the ten billets on green in the second and third fields.

The arms have been borne since 4 February 1927 when they were approved by the Bavarian Ministry of State for the Interior in Munich.

== Culture and sightseeing ==
=== Buildings ===
The following are listed buildings or sites in Rhineland-Palatinate's Directory of Cultural Monuments:

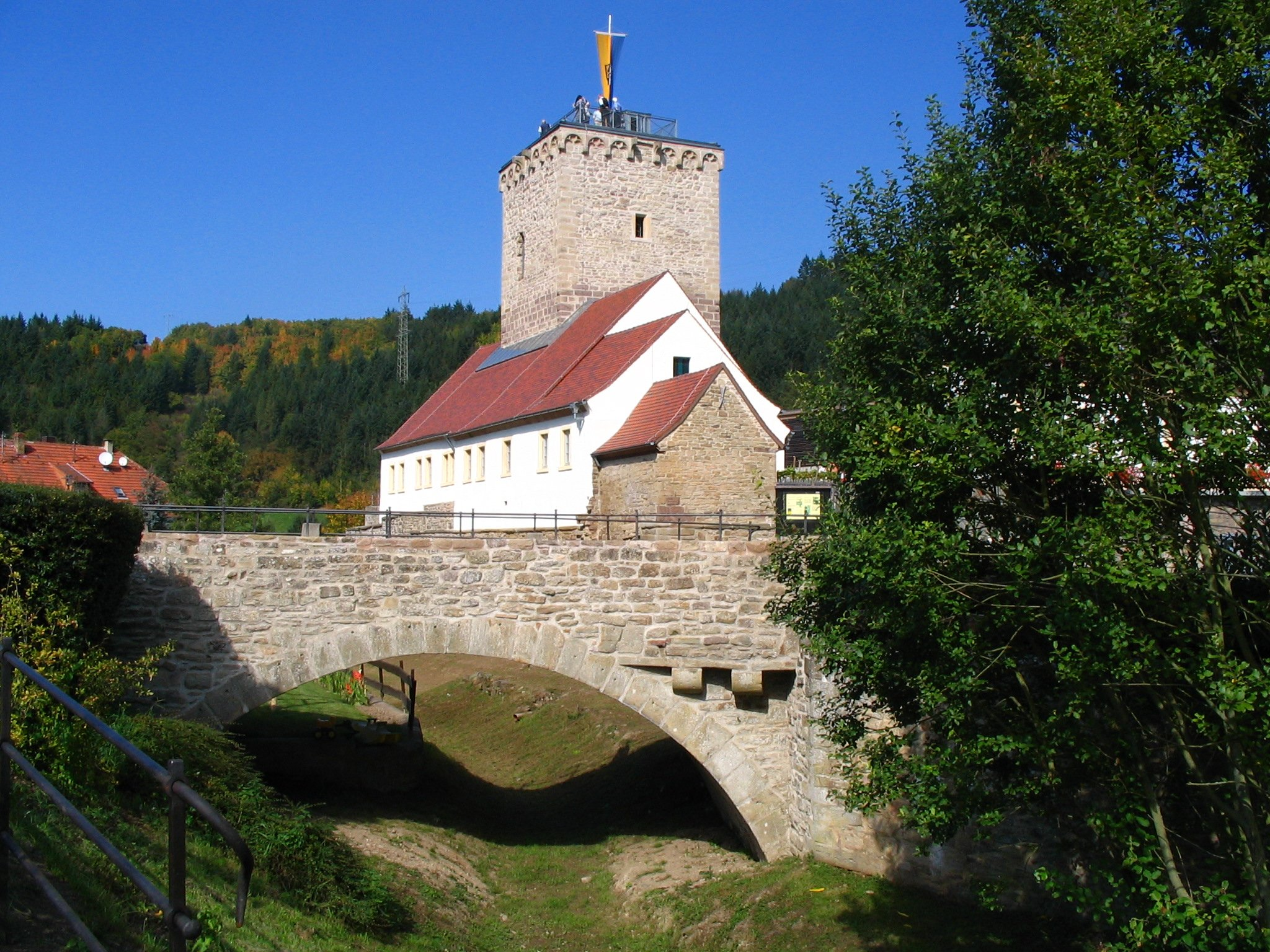
Castle monumental zone

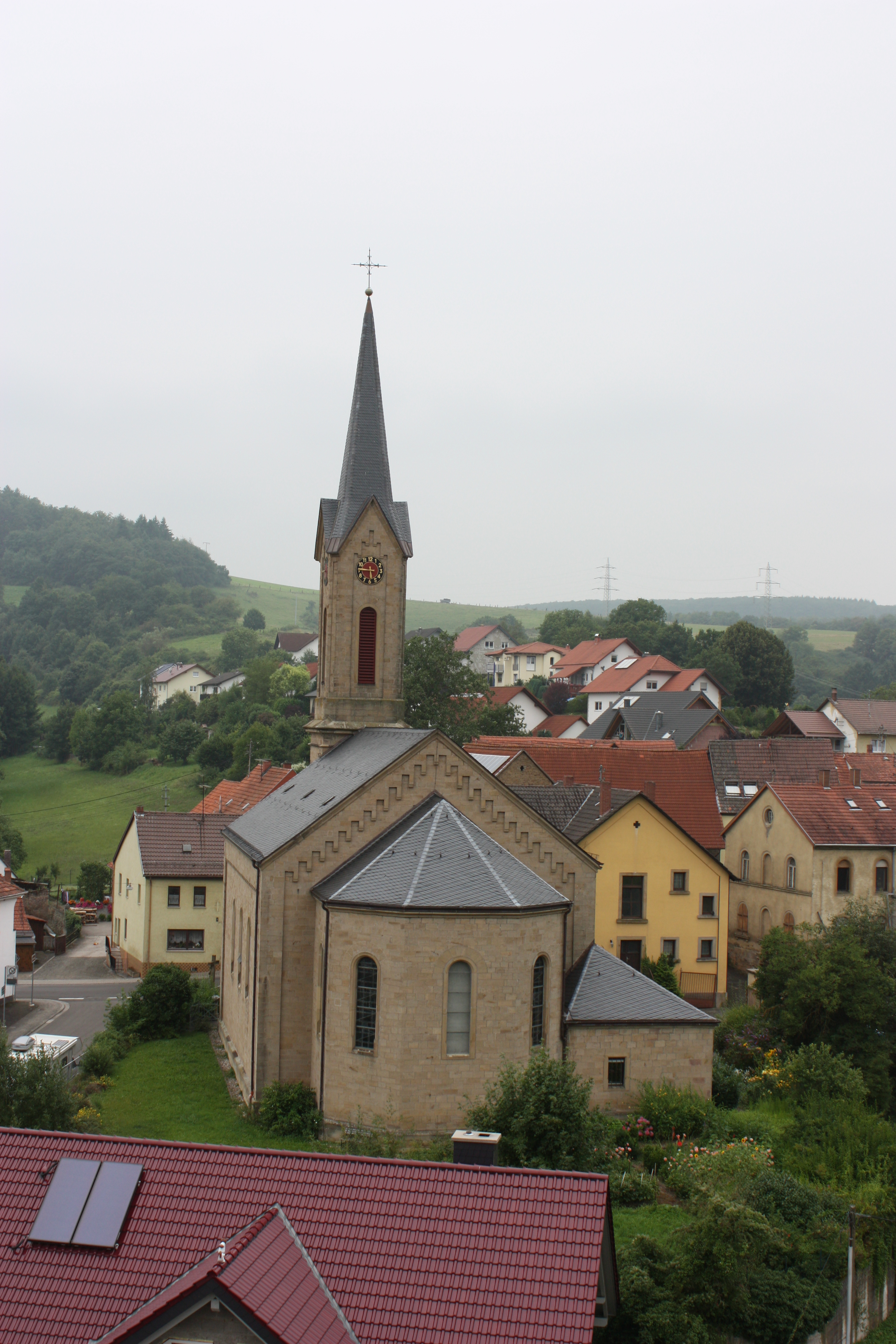
Hauptstraße 11: Catholic church

- Castle, Mühlstraße/Kegelbahnstraße (monumental zone) – former lowland castle of the Lords of Bolanden, possibly founded in 1181, first mentioned in 1276; Romanesque keep, upper floor about 1500, ringwall mainly modern renovations, vaulted cellar at Amtshaus, 16th century, well; four architectural fragments in the retaining wall, in the east a wall and a moat; one of the Palatinate's best preserved lowland castles
- Catholic church, Hauptstraße 11 – sandstone-block building, Rundbogenstil, 1879/1880; sandstone epitaph, early 17th century; in the churchyard a Crucifix, cast-iron corpus 19th century (see also below)
- Hauptstraße 8 – former Alte Schule (“Old School”), plastered building, Rundbogenstil, 1838, architect possibly Johann Schmeisser, Kusel; characterizes village's appearance
- Hauptstraße 10 – rectory, one-floor plastered building with knee wall, 1885, architect Spithaler; whole complex of buildings with church and Old Schoolhouse
- Hirtenstraße 12/13 – former Neue Schule (“New School”), plain stone-block building, 1907, architect Regional Master Builder Kleinhans
- On Landesstraße 382 not far from the north entrance to the village – hourstone; sandstone pillar, 19th century
- Ingweilerhof, Ingweilerhof 2 – four-sided complex; Baroque building with hipped roof, marked 1730, with older part; in the chapel two tomb slabs, 17th and 18th centuries
- Villa rustica, southeast of the village near the Ingweilerhof – wall traces of a small Roman country estate, 1st to 3rd century

=== More about buildings ===
Reipoltskirchen's first church, which was endowed by the village's namesake, Richbald, was followed by three others, each built on the same spot. The one that stands now is the parish church consecrated in 1880 as the Church of Saint John of Nepomuk (St. Johannes Nepomuk), whose 35 m-tall tower has become one of the municipality's landmarks.

Below the castle are three complexes from the project Kunst im Grünen (“Art in the Green”). The “landscape pictures” – actually works of art created out of landscapes – covering current themes can be viewed especially well from the castle tower.

=== Regular events ===
Reipoltskirchen holds its kermis (church consecration festival) on the first weekend in August. Among special customs still observed now is the walk of the Klepperbuben. Schoolboys gather about midday on Maundy Thursday before the church with their Klepper (ratchet-like noisemakers) and then go about the village, making noise with their Klepper and calling out “Das ist der englische Gruß, den jeder Christ beten muss!” (“That is the Hail Mary, which every Christian must pray!”). By custom, too, the church's peal of bells remains quiet from Maundy Thursday until Holy Saturday.

=== Clubs ===
Any further cultural life in Reipoltskirchen is characterized by the village's lively club life. There are a choir, a music club, a table tennis club, a gardening club, a fishing club and a volunteer fire brigade.

=== Public institutions ===
The Catholic church maintains a parish library.

== Economy and infrastructure ==
=== Economic structure ===
While in earlier times agriculture was the mainstay of Reipoltskirchen's economy, only about 20% of the villagers still earn their livelihoods at farming now. There had been job opportunities in other fields, such as forestry and mining, both practised locally. There was the Ludwigsgrube, a colliery near Reipoltskirchen, but this served mainly experimental purposes. Relatively high yields came from the pits near Hefersweiler and Relsberg, while less coal came from those near Adenbach and Rathskirchen. It was only ever lone workers who were employed at the collieries. Furthermore, there were the customary craft occupations in the village, and a mill. Far more job opportunities were on offer at the resident lordly household. Today there are still two inns and a grocery shop. Craft businesses have mostly disappeared, although there is still a metalworking shop. Among the rest of the population, only a few can pursue their work within the village itself. Most seek work in the bigger towns in the surrounding area. A forestry office still has its seat in Reipoltskirchen today.

=== Education ===
It is certain that the holders of the Lordship of Reipoltskirchen, too, put forth efforts to establish schooling. Nevertheless, no records about schools in Reipoltskirchen before 1800 are available. According to data from the registration of Jewish inhabitants in 1898, the village then had a Jewish schoolteacher. Later, standing side by side were a Catholic school and an Evangelical school. A schoolhouse for both denominations arose in 1838 near the church. In 1907, the so-called Neues Schulhaus (“New Schoolhouse”) was built on Hirtenstraße. From 1848 comes a story that a schoolteacher named Storck was denied the right to the “use of the graveyard”, which led him to complain and have himself transferred to Erzhütten (now an outlying centre of Kaiserslautern). There was temporarily no school as a result, but later there were two applicants for the post, each of whom was “properly qualified” and of “morally religious” conduct. Hired for the post was Philipp Wendel, who soon likewise demanded the use of the graveyard – for the fruit trees that grew there. This teacher's performance was not satisfactory. Because of his disorderly way of running the school and his intemperance when it came to drink, the government threatened to impose on him a punitive transfer. It did not come to that, although in 1884, the then 55-year-old teacher wanted to have himself pensioned off on the grounds of illness. The examining doctors could not confirm any illness, but nonetheless, in 1885, Wendel was sent into retirement on the grounds of having a weak memory. His successor, a man from a village in Upper Franconia, had to leave his post after a very short time in 1886 after being called into military service. A further successor had himself transferred to Hohenecken in 1887. The next schoolmaster came from Lower Bavaria, and parents accused him of spiteful excesses. The pastor announced to the government that the village was generally having bad luck with schoolteachers. When the man from Lower Bavaria only did his job on whim rather than regularly, he had to put up with half pay. Then he developed glaucoma, and because of this eye complaint he at first wanted to have himself transferred to an easier job in his homeland, but then retired from teaching at the age of 26. Even with the very next schoolteacher, who was from Falkenstein, there were problems right away. Not always was the teacher held responsible for things that went wrong in school life. In 1891, the pastor wrote “In the four years that I have been here, I have learnt that, particularly in our area, so-called Affenliebe (literally “monkey love”, meaning a kind of unhealthy, “smothering” doting) by parents towards their children prevails. Thus there have already been a few cases in which parents have gone to the regional doctor to have their children examined.” In the same year, Andreas Steets from Nuremberg was hired as a teacher. He applied to the government in 1892 for leave to marry Katharina Wildinger from Nußbach. Later he had himself temporarily pensioned because of illness. In 1897, he took on the office of conductor at the Nußbach men’s singing club and in 1901 the office of municipal scrivener. In the same year, he took early retirement owing to rheumatism. School inspections complained time and again about inadequate facilities, and about toilets that were not in proper order. Even after the First World War, there was a very high schoolteacher turnover at this Catholic one-room schoolhouse. Hired for the Protestant school in 1843 was a man named Peter Fiscus, born in 1819 in Gimsbach. As early as the next year, complaints were circulating that he “with unbecoming presumption took the liberty of speaking out about his immediate superiors”. He stayed in the post for five years. At the Protestant school, too, schoolteachers were changing all too often. In 1854, Johannes Fegert came to Reipoltskirchen. He was born in 1826 in Hüffler and died in 1893, likely in Adenbach. Because of his participation in the 1849 Revolution, Fegert had had to leave his former post in Konken. After a court case in 1850, he had first been transferred to Lauterecken, and then in 1854 to Reipoltskirchen. Here he had great difficulties getting himself named the permanent teacher. In 1858, he went to Adenbach. Between 1869 and 1879, four schoolteachers served in only this short time. The last of these was Jakob Braun, who then stayed for a longer time. He was sent on a one-year leave of absence in 1878 because of a “chest complaint”. Braun, too, met with some difficulty in the village, once being blackmailed by a forest ranger who had witnessed the teacher's son forging the school inspector's signature. Braun's successor in 1891 was Jakob Cassel, formerly of Elzweiler. He stood out for the broadminded, and to the villagers even sacrilegious, views that he uttered. It was said that he denied the Resurrection and refused to impart religious instruction. By 1895, he had been replaced by Friedrich Dembelein from Wassertrüdingen, but he was transferred to Dörnbach in 1901. There then followed yet another era of constant teacher turnover. Today, schoolchildren attend school in Wolfstein.

=== Transport ===
Serving nearby Heinzenhausen is a railway station on the Lauter Valley Railway (Lautertalbahn, Lauterecken-Kaiserslautern). Reipoltskirchen itself lies on Kreisstraßen 41 and 42 and Landesstraße 382.

== Famous people ==
=== Sons and daughters of the town ===
- Elias Grünebaum (1807–1893)

A rabbi and Jewish theologist, Grünebaum studied in Bonn and Munich and was a pupil of the philosopher Schelling. He compiled many books and other written works, and is held to be a liberal reformer of German Jewry. For more than 50 years, he headed the Rabbinical Region of Landau.

- Jakob Grünebaum

Elias’s uncle, likely born in Reipoltskirchen, Grünebaum emigrated sometime about 1850 to the United States. His sons founded banks and businesses in Chicago that still exist today under the name Greenebaum.

- Emil Heuser (1851–1928)

An historical researcher and porcelain expert, Heuser participated as an engineer in building railways in Turkey (actually the Ottoman Empire) in 1874-1880 in the Edirne area, and thereafter worked as a chief railway administrator at the Pfälzische Eisenbahn. In 1901 he published a guide to the Palatinate. He participated as a captain in the First World War and was accorded high distinction. Retired as of 1920, he worked as curator of the Historical Museum of the Palatinate (Historisches Museum der Pfalz) and publisher of the magazine Historisches Museum der Pfalz. He also published many articles, mainly about Palatine history.

- Johann Heinrich Roos (1631–1685)

Possibly born in Reipoltskirchen (at least according to his marriage certificate), as a master painter’s son, Roos later became a famous painter of animal subjects. After the Thirty Years' War, he stayed in Holland, where he became pupil of several well known painters. In 1664, he became court painter in Heidelberg, and in 1667 he went to Frankfurt. There, he died in an accident.

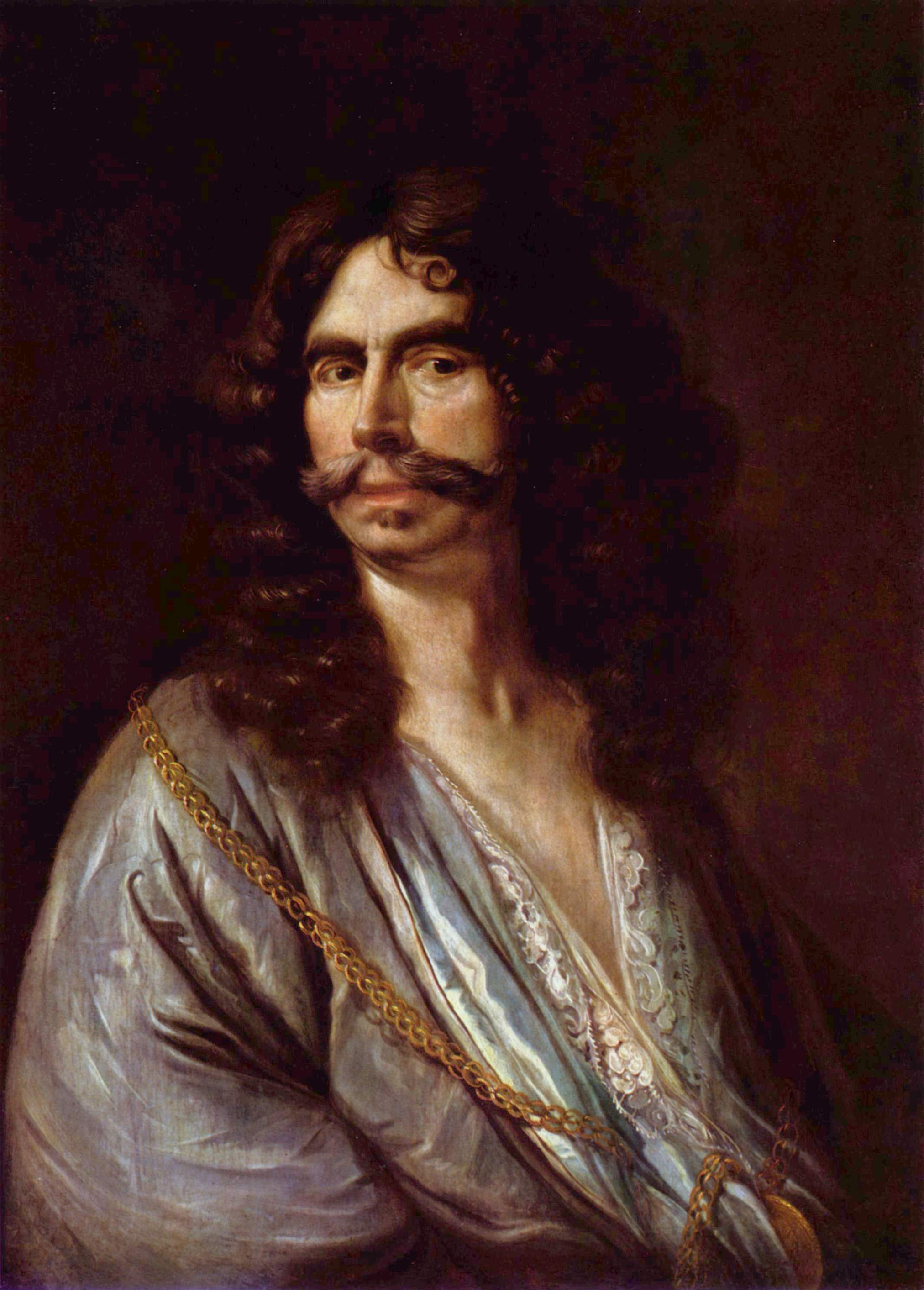
Johann Heinrich Roos

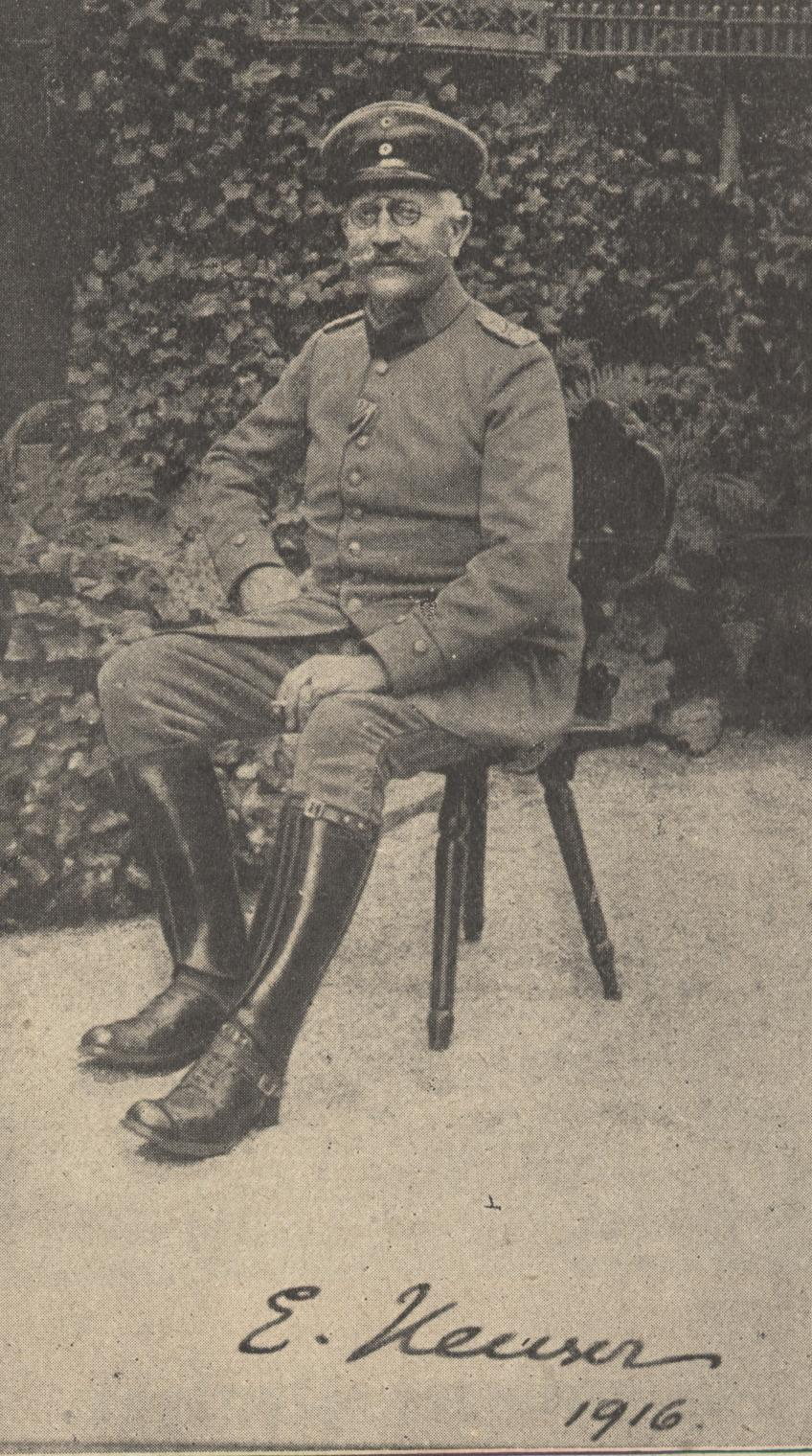
Emil Heuser in 1916

== Pictures ==
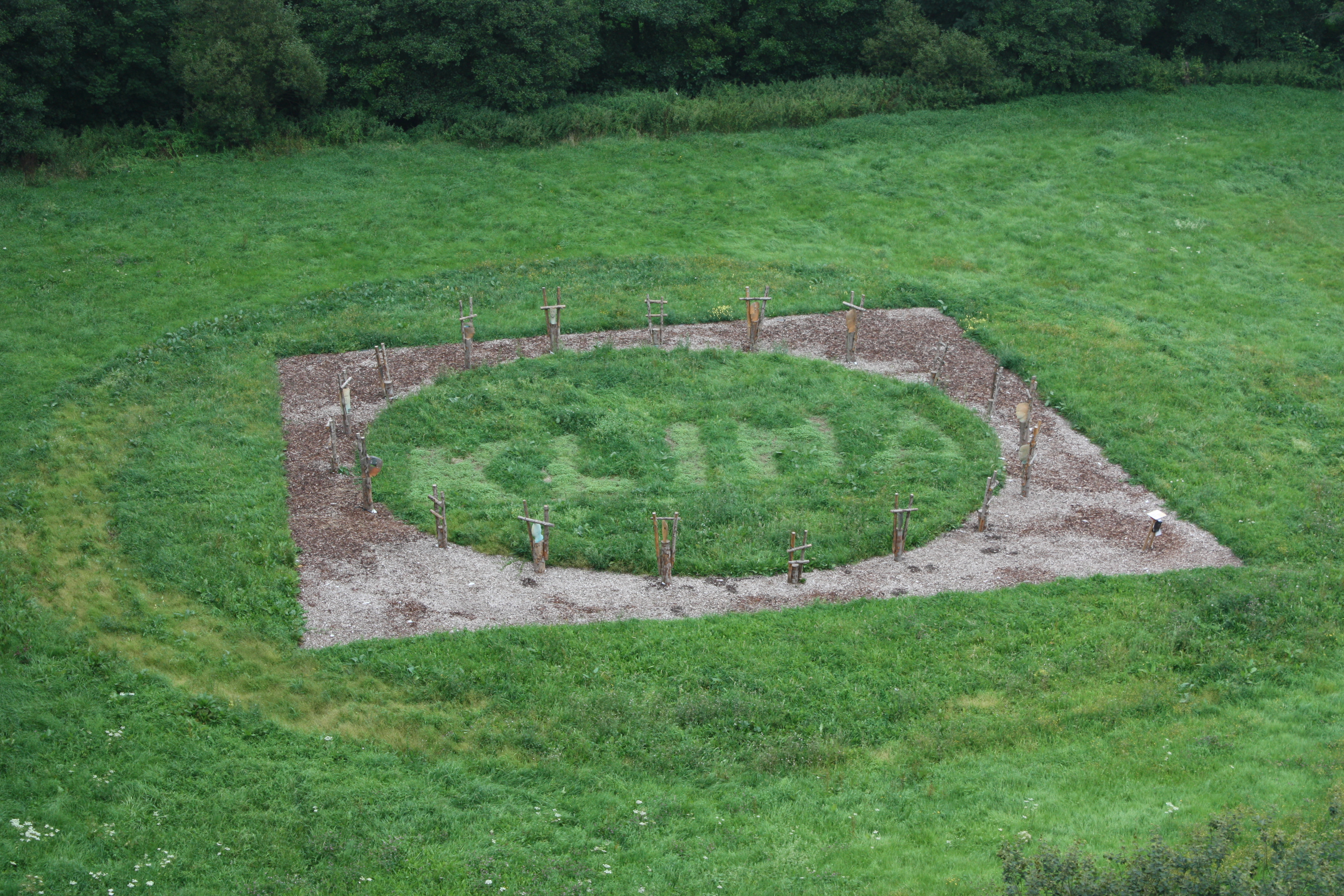
Kunst im Grünen - World Climate Conference in the “Old World”

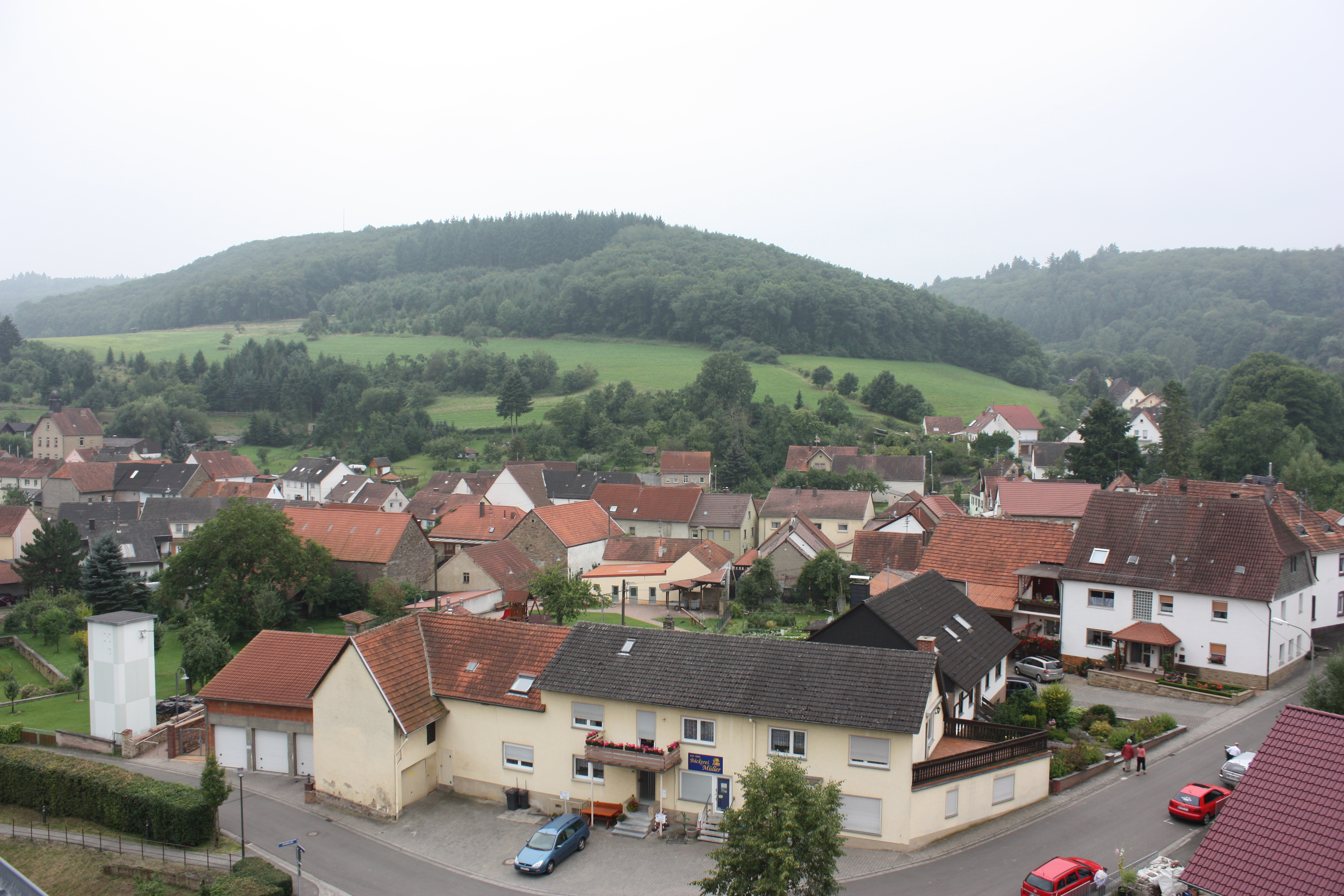
View from the castle towards the southwest

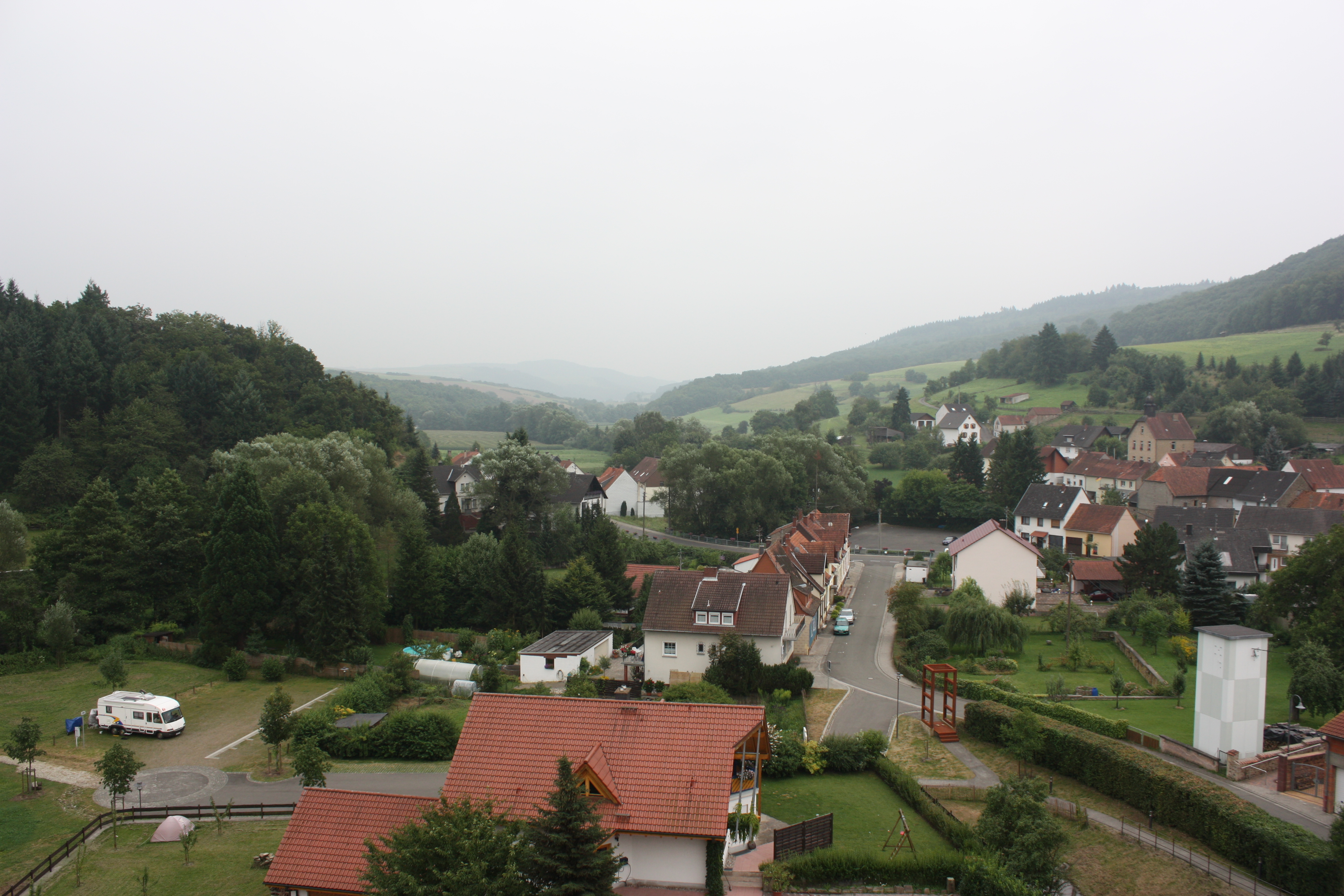
View from the castle towards the Kerweplatz (south)

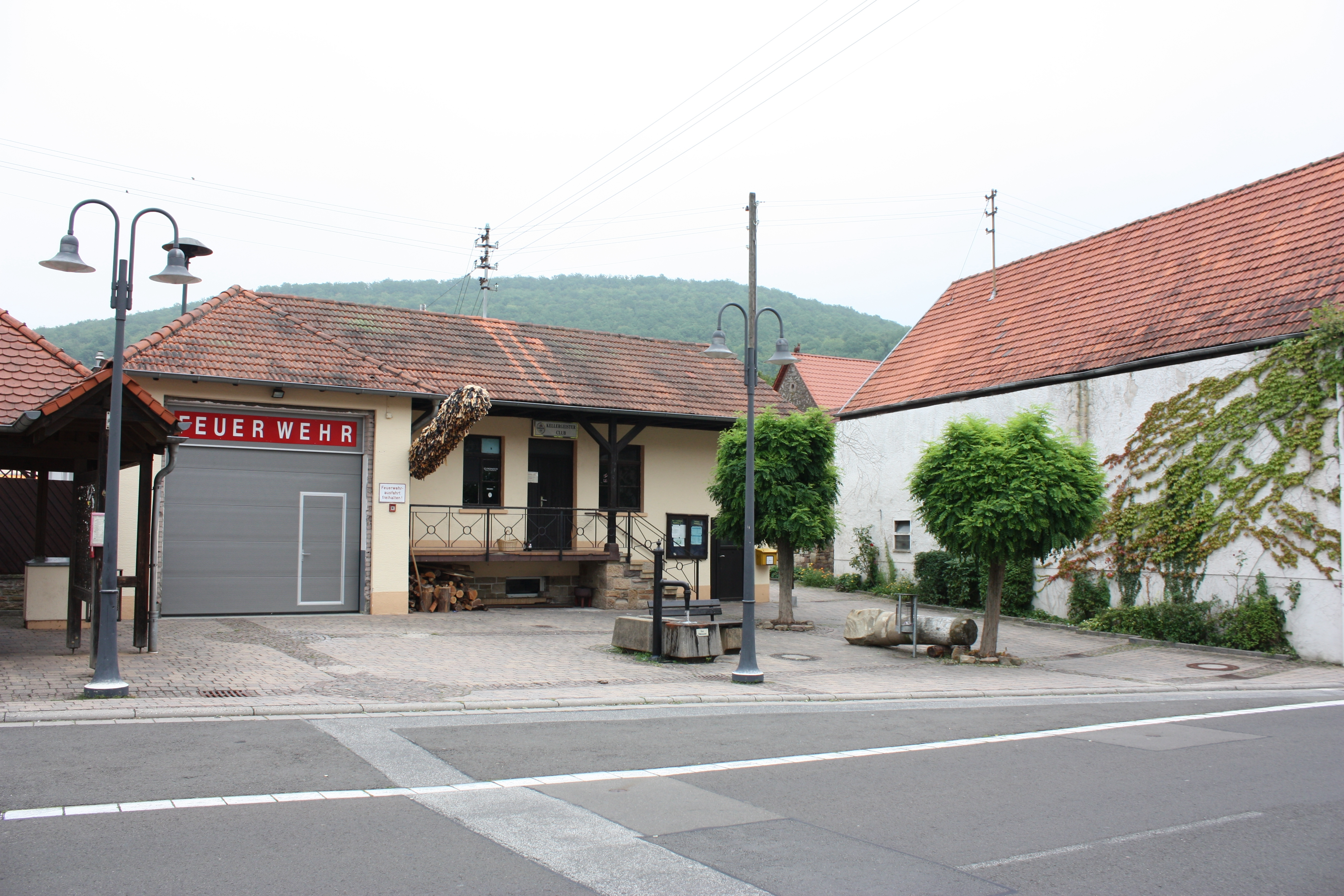
The village square with the fire brigade and the youth centre (Kellergeister)

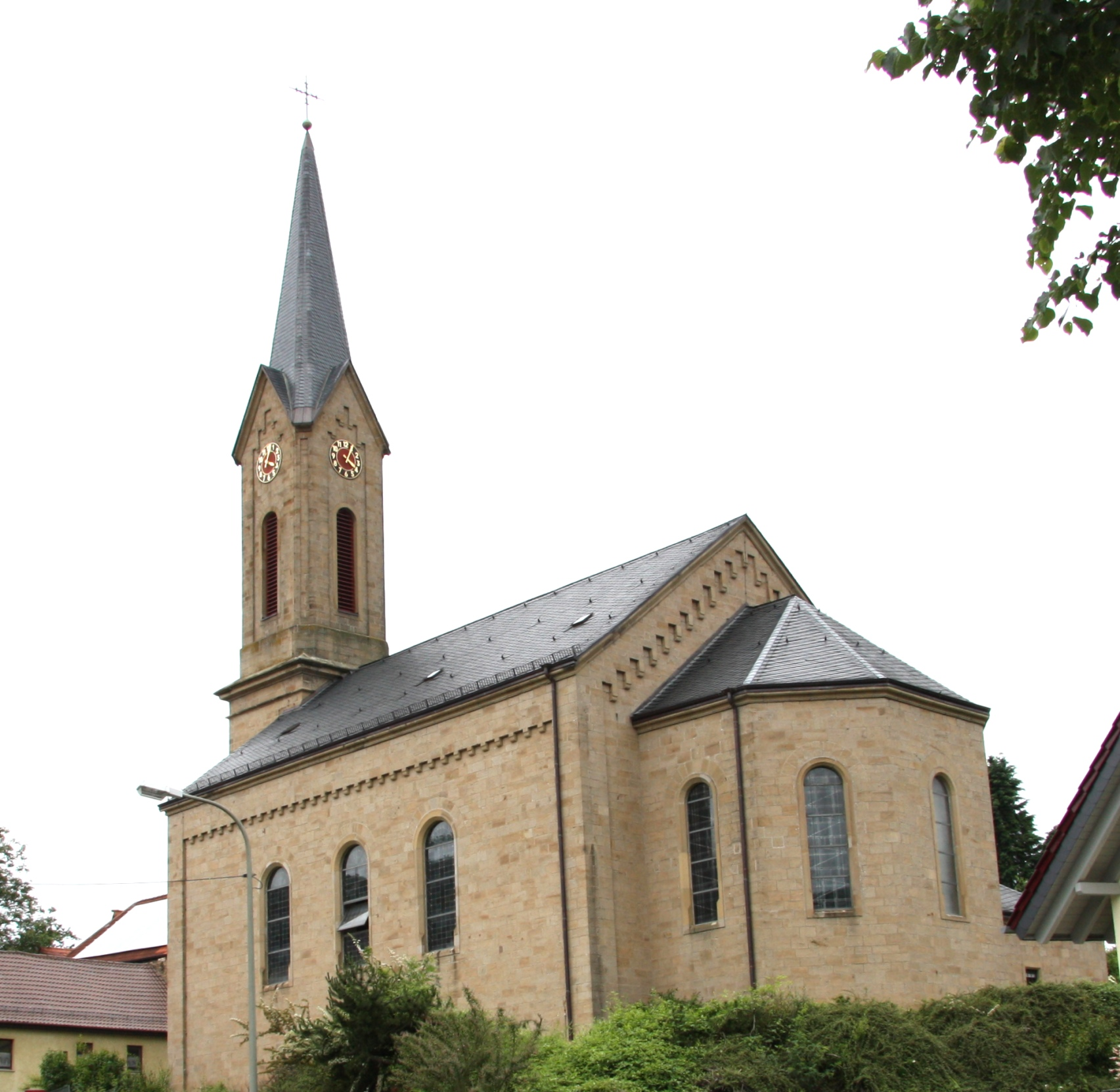
Side view of the parish church
