= Münstermann =

Münstermann is a surname of German origin.

Notable persons having this surname include:

- Carl von Münstermann (1843–1930), professor of culture and technology at the Agricultural University of Berlin
- Hans Münstermann, (born 1947), Dutch novelist
- Henricus Münstermann (died 1537), Catholic priest and abbot of Marienfeld
- Lasse Münstermann (born 1979), German snooker player
- Ludwig Münstermann (1560 or 1575–1638/1639), German sculptor
- Paul Münstermann (1932–2010), former Vice President of the Federal Intelligence Service (Bundesnachrichtendienst)
- Peter Münstermann (born 1956), German politician (SPD)
- Willi Münstermann (1903–1982), German entrepreneur, sponsor of the Krefeld Penguins
