= Einöllen =

- Municipality
- Coat of arms

- Location of Einöllen within Kusel district
- Interactive map of Einöllen
- Location within Germany Location within Rhineland-Palatinate
- Coordinates: 49°36′30″N 7°38′20″E
- Country: Germany
- State: Rhineland-Palatinate
- District: Kusel
- Municipal assoc.: Lauterecken-Wolfstein

Government
  - Mayor (2019–24): Siegfried Berndt

Area
  - Total: 4.89 km^{2} (1.89 sq mi)
- Elevation: 344 m (1,129 ft)

Population (2025-12-31)
  - Total: 387
  - Density: 79.1/km^{2} (205/sq mi)
- Time zone: UTC+01:00 (CET)
  - Summer (DST): UTC+02:00 (CEST)
- Postal codes: 67753
- Dialling codes: 06304
- Vehicle registration: KUS
- Website: www.einoellen.de

Einöllen is an Ortsgemeinde – a municipality belonging to a Verbandsgemeinde, a type of collective municipality – in the Kusel district in Rhineland-Palatinate, Germany. It belongs to the Verbandsgemeinde Lauterecken-Wolfstein.

== Geography ==
=== Location ===
The municipality lies 6 km southeast of Lauterecken and 7 km east of Offenbach-Hundheim on Landesstraße 383. Einöllen is located on a mountain ridge between the Odenbach and Lauter valleys at elevations between 303 and 360 m above sea level. The highest elevation within municipal limits is the Sattelberg at 381 m above sea level. Wolfstein lies roughly 7 km away, while it is about 35 km to each of Kusel, Kaiserslautern and Idar-Oberstein. Kreisstraße 42 leads through the actual village core and onwards to the Ausbacherhof (an outlying hamlet of Reipoltskirchen) and Reipoltskirchen into the Odenbach valley, and to Rockenhausen and the Donnersberg. Running over the heights from Lauterecken is an old Roman road leading to Hohenöllen, near to that village's namesake Hohe Halde (“High Heap” or “High Dump”) with its famous view of the Lauterschleife (a tight bow in the river Lauter). Until just before the little wood known as the Harstholz, this Roman road forms the stretch of Landesstraße 383 that today runs through Einöllen. Then, at the so-called Hohe Dohl at the vorderer Weiher (“further pond”), it bends to the left, runs between the woods and the hinterer Weiher (“hinder pond”) and meets the other Roman road coming from Kaiserslautern and leading by way of Morbach and the Ausbacherhof to Meisenheim. Given the location between the two roads, the Harstholz was ideal for Roman settlements. Within the municipality's limits, from several springs lying towards the boundary with Relsberg, rises the Sulzbach, which in its upper reaches flows through what was once the village of Heinzweiler, and which downstream from Medard empties into the river Glan. Near the Harstholz rises the Breitbach, which empties into the river Lauter in Oberweiler-Tiefenbach. Einöllen's municipal area measures 571 ha, of which 80 ha is wooded.

=== Neighbouring municipalities ===
Einöllen borders in the northeast on the municipality of Reipoltskirchen, in the southeast on the municipality of Relsberg, in the south on the town of Wolfstein, in the southwest on the municipality of Oberweiler-Tiefenbach and in the northwest on the municipality of Hohenöllen.

=== Constituent communities ===
Also belonging to Einöllen are the outlying homesteads of Berghof and Hobstätterhof.

=== Municipality’s layout ===
Serving as Einöllen's original anchor was its church, around which arose the first houses. The village spread out to both the east and the south. About 1900, the thoroughfares Landesstraße 383 and Kreisstraße 42 were each built up along both sides. A new building area was opened in the municipality's west beginning in 1970.

== History ==
=== Antiquity ===
The Einöllen area might have been settled as early as Roman times, and even somewhat earlier. In the Harstholz (wood) lie two (Dr. Hermann Gauch, who was a local, mentioned three) pre-Roman Celtic barrows. A stone sarcophagus found right nearby makes it clear that there were people here. At the Ohligrech (apparently a vulgar corruption of Ewige Quelle, meaning “Everlasting Spring”) in 1929, Dr. Hermann Gauch found several whetted stone axes from the New Stone Age. There could even be a link between the pre-Roman archaeological finds in Einöllen and the Roman villa unearthed between Reipoltskirchen and Hefersweiler in the Odenbach valley.

=== Middle Ages ===
Einöllen originally belonged to the Counts of Veldenz, whose comital seat was at Meisenheim, and who had split away from the Nahegau Counts in the early 12th century. According to Veldenz documents from 1268 and 1387, the Ampt Honhelden (using the archaic spelling of Amt), along with the chapel estate of Einöllen as an annex was one of the Veldenzes’ two allodial holdings, the other being Waldgrehweiler, which at that time was known as Grebwilre (in Modern High German this would be Grafenweiler, meaning “Count’s Hamlet). In many cases, these allodial holdings served lords as summertime seats, as it were, cottages. Einöllen apparently held much importance to the Counts of Veldenz for its “lordly pond” (alongside winegrowing at the Wingertsberg or Herrenberg at Hohenöllen). Thus, the Counts of Veldenz apparently came to the vorderer Weiher and hinterer Weiher (“further pond” and “hinder pond”), whose names still crop up today as rural cadastral toponyms, and to the neighbouring wood, the Harstholz, to do their fishing and bird hunting. Einöllen belonged to the County Palatine of Zweibrücken as of 1444. A 1615 record mentions the “Weiher bey der Eich zu Ainot” (“pond near the oak at Einöllen”). The pond area lies on a Roman road.

An estate holder named Gauch also set up a church foundation in the Middle Ages, but this was finally wiped out in 1923 in the hyperinflation that then beset the Weimar Republic.

=== Modern times ===
The Veldenzes seem to have bestowed their lordly allodial seat upon somebody else, for in 1432, Einöllen was a dower estate held by Sofie von Eich, who was Wilhelm Wolf von Sponheim's wife. He, in turn, was one of the owners of Castle Alt-Wolfstein (near Wolfstein). In 1595, according to records from Disibodenberg, tithing rights in Einöllen belonged to the Order of Saint John. In the 15th century, the Amt seat was moved and there then appeared the Amt or Gericht (court region) of Einöllen, which also took in Hohenöllen, Sulzbach (now Sulzhof, an outlying homestead of Hohenöllen), Oberweiler, Tiefenbach, Rossbach, Stahlhausen and Immetshausen. In 1768, Einöllen passed by way of the Selz-Hagenbach Exchange from the Oberamt of Meisenheim and the Duchy of Palatinate-Zweibrücken (to which the County of Veldenz had passed in 1444) to the Electorate of the Palatinate’s Amt of Wolfstein and Oberamt of Kaiserslautern.

==== Recent times ====
After the French Revolution in 1789 and the subsequent French occupation that lasted until 1814, Einöllen belonged to the Canton of Wolfstein and the Department of Mont-Tonnerre (or Donnersberg in German). Around 1800, under Napoleonic French rule, Einöllen was fleetingly a mairie (“mayoralty”), as witnessed by Jakob Gauch, whom historic records describe as the municipal head, border stone minder and provisional mayor. From 1815 on, the village belonged to the Kingdom of Bavaria, within which it lay in the canton of Wolfstein in the Landkommissariat (later Bezirk, and later still Landkreis or “rural district”) of Kaiserslautern. In the 18th and 19th centuries, there was coalmining in Einöllen, as there was in neighbouring villages. In 1900, Einöllen became a self-administering Bürgermeisterei (“mayoralty”) within the Kusel district. In August 1923, as in Hohenöllen, Rossbach and Rutsweiler, emergency money (Notgeld) was issued in Einöllen to finance the installation of an electrical supply, with each note being signed by the then mayor, Welker, and his deputy, Wannenmacher. In the Second World War, the Americans marched into the village on 19 March 1945. After the war and the establishment of Germany's new political order, the village was part of the Kusel district in the then newly founded state of Rhineland-Palatinate. Beginning in 1969, in the course of administrative restructuring in the state, Verbandsgemeinden were founded. Einöllen belongs to the Verbandsgemeinde of Wolfstein.

=== Population development ===
Mentioned in a 1544 Weistum (a Weistum – cognate with English wisdom – was a legal pronouncement issued by men learned in law in the Middle Ages and early modern times) was a Schultheiß named Hans Möller (or Müller). Other “old” names are Keller (1580) and Schmidt (1648), whereas the later influential family Gauch, which produced, among other people, a prominent Nazi academic and postwar Holocaust denier (Hermann Gauch), first crops up in Einöllen's history only about 1740. The earliest population figures for Einöllen come from a 1587 homage list. Named herein were 14 bowmen and 3 simple servants. All together, there were then some 90 persons living in the village. Striking is that even today there are many household or family names that are derived from feminine given names: Mahlches, (from Amalie), Gretches (from Margarete), Reles (from Aurelie), Rosas, Rosalies, Sennes (from Susanne), Settches (from Rosette). The women from whom these names were taken mostly lived alone in the village at the turn of the 20th century, while their husbands sought work far away, mostly as travelling musicians.

The following table shows population development over the centuries for Einöllen:

Year	1787	1797	1837	1939	1946	1961	1971	1976	1986	1996
Total	185	238	432	557	618	557	578	566	519	525

=== Municipality’s name ===
Einöllen was once known as Eynet (1432), or Einheit (1438). The latter form is worthy of note, not only because in Modern High German it means “unit” or “oneness”, but also because it is a form of Einod, an old word meaning “personal property”, here referring to the Veldenzes’ allodial holding. Beginning about 1550, however, especially in the Meisenheim visitation protocols, the village was called Ainot or Ainöt. Thereafter, the name seems to have assimilated somewhat to the neighbouring village's name, Hohenöllen, which evolved from Hoenhelden (Modern High German: hohe Halde, meaning “high heap” or “high dump”), eventually becoming today's Einöllen. Thus in 1438, the name had already become Eynhelden. In 1599, from a description of two estates, the Ingweilerhof and the Ausbacherhof, in the Speyer State Archive, the names Einod and Einölln were used side by side, as were Ainodt and Einellen in 1612 according to a record from Disibodenberg.

== Religion ==
The first clergyman based in Einöllen was the Reverend Johann Kuch (or Kuchius), whose grave, with an epitaph, can still be found in the church. He planted a vineyard on the hill now known as the Kuchiuskopf, after him, and vines may still be found there today. A rural cadastral name also recalls Kuch, the Kuchiuswögelchen. After the rectory at Tiefenbach was laid waste by the French in 1670, the parish seat was moved to Einöllen. In 1402, the Counts transferred the parish church to the Order of Saint John. The Early Gothic window that is still preserved in the church's belltower, which may well date from as early as the 12th century, suggests that the church may go back to a chapel built by one of the Counts of Veldenz about 1200, or perhaps even back to Count Gerlach I's time. He died in 1163. An unambiguous clue as to the building date comes from the 1590 Meisenheim Reformed ecclesiastical visitation protocol. In a 1536 statement provided by the then notary public and pastor at Tiefenbach, Petrus Rod (also known as Peter Rad or Peter Radius), it says: “Die Gemeinde zu Eynoth hat die Kapelle St-, Barbarae et Huperti auf ihre Kosten erbaut und erhalten ohne jemands Zuthun, ist jetzt 106 Jahre her” (“The community at Einöllen built and maintained Saint Barbara’s and Saint Hubert’s chapel at its own cost without anyone’s help; is now 106 years ago”). Going by this, the building date would be 1430. Belonging in 1565 to the parish, whose seat was in Tiefenbach, were Diesenberg, Einöllen, Hohenöllen, Imetshausen, Mühlhausen, Oberweiler, Rossbach, Stahlhausen and Sulzbach. From 1670 to 1717, Einöllen was the sole parish seat, as the church in Tiefenbach had been destroyed. In 1729, the church was expanded. Belonging nowadays to the Einöllen mother church are the branches of Relsberg, Hohenöllen-Sulzhof in the Verbandsgemeinde of Lauterecken and the Ausbacherhof, which belongs to the municipality of Reipoltskirchen. Catholic citizens attend church services in Reipoltskirchen. Both Evangelical and Catholic Christians were buried at the churchyard, but there have been no burials there since 1820. A new municipal graveyard was laid out north of the village, towards Hohenöllen.

== Politics ==
=== Municipal council ===
The council is made up of 8 council members, who were elected by majority vote at the municipal election held on 7 June 2009, and the honorary mayor as chairman.

=== Mayor ===
Einöllen's mayor is Siegfried Berndt.

=== Coat of arms ===
The German blazon originally read: In Blau ein linkshingewendeter goldener Pflug, der natürliches Ackerland durchfurcht. In 1985, however, this was changed to read: In Blau ein links hingewendeter goldener Pflug, natürliches Ackerland durchpflügend.

The municipality's arms might in English heraldic language be described thus: Azure on cropland proper a plough sinister Or.

The arms have been borne since 6 October 1925, when they were approved by the Bavarian Ministry of State.

While the arms shown in this article render the ground in brown, the example shown on the municipality's own website renders it in green. However, these renderings both conform to the blazon (“natürliches”/“proper”), which prescribes natural colour.

== Culture and sightseeing ==
=== Buildings ===
The following are listed buildings or sites in Rhineland-Palatinate’s Directory of Cultural Monuments:

- Protestant parish church, Schulstraße 10 – small aisleless church, 1430, remodelling 1729; Stumm organ from 1812/1813

=== Music ===
Einöllen lies in the so-called Musikantenland (“Minstrels’ Land”) in the northeast part of the Kusel district. The profession Musikant, perhaps better described as Wandermusikant (“travelling minstrel” or “travelling musician”), might have arisen about 1830. A certain predisposition for music, but perhaps more significantly a dearth of other job opportunities, might have led to the birth of this endeavour, locally described as Wandermusikantentum. Registered in Einöllen for 1903 were 46 professional musicians. With their master, the young people – some only 14 years old – travelled in a group to Germany's cities, and also abroad to England, Norway, Sweden, the United States and even Australia. To pay for the voyages, they gave concerts aboard the steamships on which they travelled. With the money that they earned, they could buy fields back in their homeland or even build houses, which they would then adorn with a lyre, the musician's hallmark. In 1955, the 75-year-old former Wandermusikant Heinrich Engel came back to visit his home village. He had travelled with an orchestra to Australia in 1895, and had then settled in New Zealand. As of April 2014, his youngest daughter is still alive and resides in Auckland, New Zealand. He gave the house that he had built there his birthplace's name. (See the Hinzweiler article – sections History and Famous people – for more about the West Palatine Wandermusikantentum).

=== Regular events ===
The kermis (church consecration festival, locally known as the Kerwe) is held on the second weekend in October. On Sunday afternoon, the village youth carry a tree decorated with colourful streamers, the Kerwestrauß (“kermis bouquet”) through the village. This is then fixed onto an inn, and then comes the Kerwepredigt (“kermis sermon”), in which the Kerwepfarrer (“kermis pastor”) reads out a rhyming, humorous account of the year's happenings. The kermis ends late Tuesday evening with the traditional burning of a straw doll, the so-called Kerwelotte. On 1 May, there is a May Day celebration (Maifeier) complete with the raising of a Maypole. Every other year, the local clubs and the political establishment stage a village festival. Each summer, the Pfälzerwaldverein (a hiking club) holds its forest festival (Waldfest) at its own forest clubhouse in the Strieth (wood).

== Economy and infrastructure ==
=== Economic structure ===
Until 1960, Einöllen was well supplied with shops serving daily needs. Found in the village in those days were four grocer’s shops, two hairdresser’s shops, two locksmiths, two blacksmiths, two painting businesses, two butcher’s shops, two bakers, two tailors, two shoemakers, one wainwright and two inns. The two inns are still in business, and alongside them are a building company, a woodworking company that makes furniture, a window construction company, a bakery and a plant nursery. In the 18th and 19th centuries, there were limestone and coal mines in Einöllen. The Drostengrube near the Strieth woods yielded more than 500 t of black coal in 1781. According to the local lore, one gallery dating from this time reaches right under the village's built-up area. Until after the Second World War, Einöllen was strongly characterized by agriculture. Almost every family owned grain or potato fields, orchards and vegetable gardens. In 1940, Einöllen had 71 agricultural operations, more than half of which, 44, worked an area of between 2 and 10 ha, while two bigger ones worked areas of more than 20 ha. There were seven hereditary farms, of which six were of less than 20 ha and one more. Making up the agricultural lands were 346 ha of cropland, 217 ha of grain fields, 3 ha of gardening and fruitgrowing lands, 124 ha of meadowland, 1 ha of vineyard and 86 ha of forest. The farms Heinzweiler, Harstholz, Hobstätten and Kinzenäcker have not been mentioned as homesteads since the 17th century; their names, however, persist as cadastral toponyms for farm fields. Since 1960, three agricultural operations have established themselves outside the village's built-up area on the other side of the Sulzbach, one of which lies right near the former Hobstätten farm mentioned above. The strip fields Kinzenacker, Hebenacker, Krippes, Wetterhembusch, Dörrstück and Zwerchgräben never were of any great quality for farming. The fields with the greatest yields were Auf dem Grund, Layenacker, Dellweidchen and Rudershöll. Nowadays, only one professional farmer is to be found in Einöllen, and two of the three farmers who have moved out of the village are already seeking their livelihoods in other fields of endeavour. Many buildings formerly designed and planned for agriculture have been “modernized” into contemporary dwellings. About 1900, agriculture and crafts offered only a few people a fair livelihood. Anyone who wanted to earn a lot of money had to work in the Ruhr area or the Saarland. Nowadays, only a few people living in Einöllen actually work here. The foremost destination for women who commute is the firm Braun, a maker of elastic bandages in Wolfstein, whereas men mainly commute to jobs in Kaiserslautern and Kusel, or even as far as Ludwigshafen.

=== Education ===
One of the first teachers in Einöllen was Johann Nicolaus Frenger, who was born in Heiligenmoschel. From 1747 to 1758, he taught here, followed by his son Christian, who in turn was followed by Christian's nephew Johann Jakob Frenger. About the turn of the 20th century, levels 1 to 7 were all being taught in one room – now the municipal centre – by a teacher named Bühler. Once a small school for levels 1 to 4 was built (today the kindergarten), about 1900, there was more room, improving the situation. Mr. Kleindienst taught here, while Mr. Matthias took care of the “big” school. Since 1968, primary school pupils have been attending classes at the primary school in Wolfstein, while older students have been going to the Hauptschule, likewise in Wolfstein, the Gymnasium in Lauterecken or others in Kaiserslautern. The kindergarten is attended by children from Einöllen and Relsberg.

=== Transport ===
To the west runs Bundesstraße 270. Serving Wolfstein is a railway station on the Lautertalbahn.

== Famous people ==
=== Sons and daughters of the town ===
Dr. Hermann Gauch (b. 1899 in Einöllen; d. 1978 in Kaiserslautern, buried in Einöllen), SS Untersturmführer, Nazi race theorist and Holocaust denier – Gauch graduated as a medical doctor in 1924, and became a specialist in internal medicine, a chief field doctor and in 1930, head of the North Sea hygiene-bacteriological research post and ship's doctor aboard the Reichsmarine survey ship Meteor. In 1934, he received a teaching post at the Landwirtschaftliche Hochschule Berlin (Agricultural University of Berlin) and then moved as a Reich office and staff leader for tradition and history to the Reichshandwerker- und Nährstand. He was responsible for folklore, blood group research, psycholinguistics, genetics, protohistory and genealogy. Gauch published books and many articles, among which were:

- Odal- oder Allodverfassung , 2nd edition, 1934
- Kalender und Brauchtum, 1939
- Die Entstehung unserer Sprache und Schrift, 1970
- Die Gestalten der Heldensage als geschichtliche Persönlichkeiten 1971

Gauch's views on race were extreme, even for Nazi Germany, and at times actually caused Hitler's régime embarrassment. Although Gauch was cleared of any responsibility for the Nazis’ war crimes, his name was brought up at Adolf Eichmann’s trial as one who was said to have provided ideological justification for the Holocaust by writing that “non-Nordics” were “sub-human”. Gauch clung to his Nazi beliefs all his life.
