= Sigfrid Gauch =

German writer (born 1945)

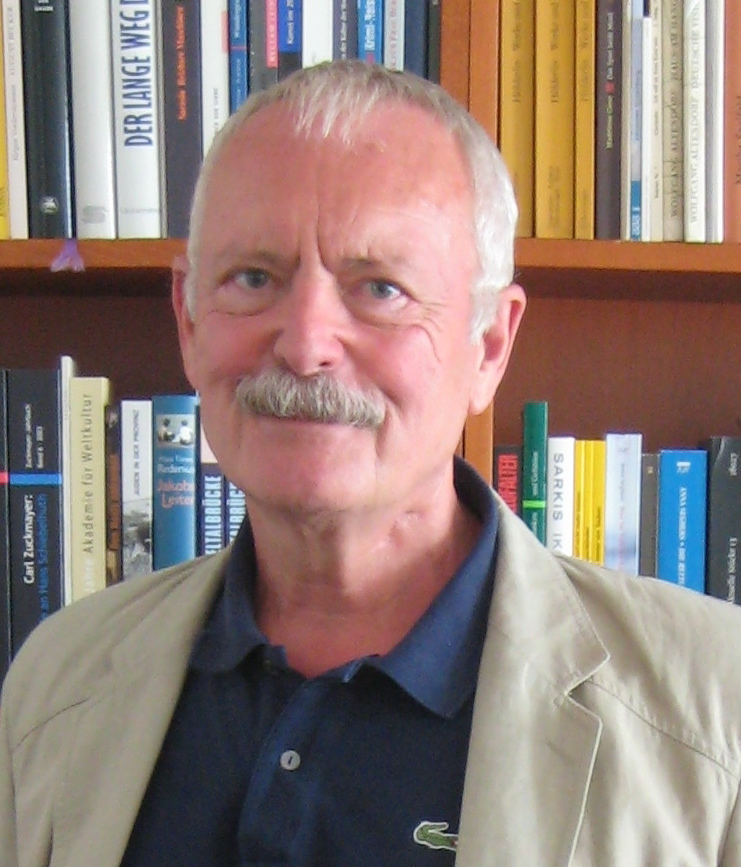
Sigfrid Gauch in 2008

Sigfrid Gauch (born 9 March 1945) is a German writer. He lives in Mainz.

Gauch is the son of Hermann Gauch, a Nazi official and member of the SS. He was born in Offenbach-Hundheim in the last few weeks of the Second World War. His parents separated when he was a young boy. He studied at the Universities of Heidelberg and Mainz.

He worked as a school teacher, teaching German, philosophy and ethics at the Integrierte Gesamtschule in Mainz. He was awarded a doctorate from the University of Mainz in 1985 for a dissertation on "Overt and covert spellings in literary Jacobinism". It was later published as Friedrich Joseph Emerich – ein deutscher Jakobiner. Studien zu Leben und Werk.

In the 1970s Gauch published essays and poetry. He made his name with his book Vaterspuren (Traces of My Father) in 1979, an influential memoir that began what later became a genre of literature about children of Nazi parents attempting to come to terms with their family's past. He later published Fundsachen. Die Quellen zum Roman Vaterspuren, a collection of primary source material related to the book. His novels Winterhafen (2010) and Schattenbilder (2012) explore the same issues through fiction.

In addition to his novels, short stories and poetry collections Gauch has co-edited numerous anthologies, especially with regard to literature from Rhineland-Palatinate, including, from 1994, the Rheinland-pfälzisches Jahrbuch für Literatur (Rhineland-Palatinate Yearbook of literature) published by Brandes & Apsel. Since 2002, this has come out under the title Jahrbuch für Literatur (Yearbook for Literature). Since 2004, he has edited the Edition Schrittmacher series of books, of which 30 volumes have been published.
