= Hermann Gauch =

Nazi race theorist (1899–1978)

- Born: 6 May 1899; Einöllen, Kingdom of Bavaria, German Empire
- Died: 7 November 1978 (aged 79); Kaiserslautern, Rhineland-Palatinate, West Germany
- Military career
- Allegiance: German Empire (to 1918); Nazi Germany
- Branch: (1934–5)
- Service years: 1917–1918; 1939–1945
- Rank: Untersturmführer
- Conflicts: World War I: Battle of Soissons; World War II: Polish Campaign; Battle of France; Invasion of Yugoslavia

Hermann Gauch (6 May 1899 – 7 November 1978) was a Nazi race theorist noted for his dedication to Nordic theory to an extent that embarrassed the Nazi leadership when he claimed that Italians were "half ape". Briefly adjutant to Heinrich Himmler, his career was later stalled by Himmler himself. During World War II he served with distinction in the Yugoslav campaign.

After the war he remained devoted to Nazism and Holocaust denial, claiming that Jewish deaths in the Holocaust were exaggerated and becoming an activist in the neo-Nazi Deutsche Reichspartei. His life and ideas were recorded by his politically unsympathetic son Sigfrid Gauch in a memoir which was the first significant example of the genre of "father memoirs" written by the children of former Nazis.

== Early life ==
Gauch was born in Einöllen. His father was a farmer, who died of malaria in Africa when Hermann was 14. From 1913 to 1917 he studied at Kaiserslautern and Augsburg. In 1917 he joined the German army, participating in the late stages of World War I. He was badly injured at the Battle of Soissons in 1918 and captured by American troops. He escaped from a French prison camp in 1919.

In the post-war years Gauch trained to become a physician, qualifying in 1924. In 1922 he joined the Nazi party, becoming a member of Rudolf Hess's S.A. unit. In 1924 he participated in the assassination of Franz Josef Heinz, leader of the separatist government of the Palatinate. At this time Gauch was closest to the circles of the Nordicist and neopagan faction within the party led by Himmler, Alfred Rosenberg and Walter Darré.

After the Nazi party was disbanded following the Beer Hall Putsch, Gauch's party membership lapsed. He did not renew it in 1925 when the party was re-established because by that time he was employed as a doctor in the Handelsmarine (merchant marine) and later the Kriegsmarine, which precluded party membership. He rejoined the party in 1934, also becoming a member of the SS. He was briefly Himmler's adjutant for cultural and racial affairs, but was not a success in the post. He resigned from the SS in 1935 after marriage became a requirement for membership. His application to rejoin in 1937 was turned down by Himmler personally.

== Theories ==
Gauch remained close to Darré, whose vision of the agricultural self-sufficiency of Nordic peasantry he shared. He wrote six books of "race research" while a member of the SS, expressing both antisemitic and Nordicist ideas, emphasising them to an extent that was extreme even in Nazi Germany. He insisted in 1933 that the fact that "birds can be taught to talk better than other animals is explained by the fact that their mouths are Nordic in structure." He further claimed that in humans, "the shape of the Nordic gum allows a superior movement of the tongue, which is the reason why Nordic talking and singing are richer." In 1934 his most important book New Foundations for Racial Research was published. Gauch argued that,

We can advance the assertion that at the base of all Racial Science there is no concept of "human being" in contradistinction to animals separated by any physical or mental trait; the only existing differentiation is between Nordic man, on the one hand, and animals as a whole, including all non-Nordic human beings, or sub-men, who are transitional forms of development. It has not been proven, moreover, that the non-Nordic man cannot be mated with apes.

However Gauch soon caused embarrassment to the leadership when he published Out of the Flower Garden of Racial Research, in which he went further, calling Italians "half-ape". As a result, the work was banned in Nazi Germany.

He also believed that racial mixture led to disease, claiming that "Hereditary cancer is the conflict of races within the human body."

Gauch also advocated de-Christianising German culture. He submitted a proposal to Darré to reform the calendar, getting rid of Christian festivals and replacing them with Germanic pagan ones. The proposal led to a protest from the future Pope Pius XII. He also proposed that Charlemagne, known as Karl the Great (Karl der Grosse) in German, should be officially renamed Karl the Slaughterer, because of his wars against the pagan Saxons in the name of Christianity. He was instrumental in the creation of a memorial to pagans murdered by Charlemagne in the Massacre of Verden, which was erected in Verden an der Aller in 1935.

== World War II ==
Gauch enlisted on the outbreak of World War II, serving initially in the Luftwaffe, but was later invalided out after damaging his spine in an accident during a training flight. He subsequently claimed that he had suggested to Himmler the policy of Germanisation in Poland, by absorbing racially suitable Polish children, who showed "Nordic" characteristics. On 13 October 1939 he took custody of downed RAF officer Harry Day, with whom he remained in contact after the war.

He served in the Yugoslav campaign and was commended for his actions capturing Zagreb with a few men. He then became a doctor with the 23rd Luftnachrichtenregiment. Reapplying once more to the SS in 1942, his application was supported by Oswald Pohl, but he was again rejected by Himmler. He ran a hospital in Lauterecken until the final stage of the war, when he was transferred to the Western front, suffering a serious injury in the last few weeks of the conflict.

== Post-war ==
Gauch was cleared of involvement in war crimes following the denazifaction process, but could not work as a state physician. He maintained a successful private practice in Kaiserslautern. According to his son, he continued to believe in his racial theories after the war, convincing himself that neo-Nazis would eventually take power in Germany. He also argued that accepted statistics of Jewish deaths in the Holocaust were highly exaggerated, and indeed impossible. He was an active member of the Deutsche Reichspartei, and acted as its regional spokesman on culture and education. In 1961 he was named in the Eichmann trial for providing ideological justification for the Holocaust because of his view that non-Nordics are "sub-human".

== Family ==
He married in 1943. His son Sigfrid was born in 1945, a few weeks before the end of the war. The couple also had a daughter. Hermann's womanising led to him separating from his wife seven years later, and he subsequently lived with a mistress. Soon after his death in 1978 Sigfrid published Vaterspuren (1979; translated as Traces of my Father), a book which provided a model for later memoirs about coping with a Nazi family background.
