= Hohenöllen =

- Municipality
- Coat of arms

- Location of Hohenöllen within Kusel district
- Interactive map of Hohenöllen
- Location within Germany Location within Rhineland-Palatinate
- Coordinates: 49°37′12″N 7°37′40″E
- Country: Germany
- State: Rhineland-Palatinate
- District: Kusel
- Municipal assoc.: Lauterecken-Wolfstein

Government
  - Mayor (2019–24): Hans Jürgen Reule

Area
  - Total: 5.17 km^{2} (2.00 sq mi)
- Elevation: 312 m (1,024 ft)

Population (2025-12-31)
  - Total: 351
  - Density: 67.9/km^{2} (176/sq mi)
- Time zone: UTC+01:00 (CET)
  - Summer (DST): UTC+02:00 (CEST)
- Postal codes: 67744
- Dialling codes: 06382
- Vehicle registration: KUS
- Website: vg-lauterecken.de

Hohenöllen is an Ortsgemeinde – a municipality belonging to a Verbandsgemeinde, a kind of collective municipality – in the Kusel district in Rhineland-Palatinate, Germany. It belongs to the Verbandsgemeinde Lauterecken-Wolfstein.

== Geography ==
=== Location ===
The municipality lies on a high plateau at the edge of a mountain east of and above the Lauter valley in the North Palatine Uplands at an elevation of some 315 m above sea level. There is a particularly picturesque view of Hohenöllen in the heights from the valley. Other heights within municipal limits are the Hansmauler Kopf in the south (325 m) and the Wolfersheck in the north (366 m). The hamlet of the Sulzhof with its 15 or so houses lies north of the village on the way to Cronenberg, which itself lies roughly 4 km from Hohenöllen's main centre in the Sulzbach valley at an elevation of only 227 m above sea level. The Birkenhof was founded about 1970 as an Aussiedlerhof (outlying agricultural settlement), and lies about 200 m north of Hohenöllen. The municipal area measures 517 ha, of which roughly 9 ha is settled and 95 ha is wooded.

=== Neighbouring municipalities ===
Hohenöllen borders in the north on the municipality of Cronenberg, in the northeast on the municipality of Ginsweiler, in the east on the municipality of Reipoltskirchen, in the southeast on the municipality of Einöllen, in the south on the municipality of Oberweiler-Tiefenbach, in the west on the municipality of Heinzenhausen and in the northwest on the municipality of Lohnweiler and the town of Lauterecken. Hohenöllen also meets the town of Wolfstein at a single point in the southwest.

=== Constituent communities ===
Also belonging to Hohenöllen are the outlying homesteads of Sulzhof and Birkenhof.

=== Municipality’s layout ===
Hohenöllen is a clump village whose main inhabited area lies on an old road running upon the plateau, skirting the Lauter valley's steeply sloped eastern edge. Particularly noteworthy buildings named by Schüler-Beigang are the schoolhouse and a classroom that stands next door, a day labourer's house and the war memorial that stands in the open countryside to the village's south. Otherwise, the village's appearance is dominated by farmhouses, either Einfirsthäuser (houses with a single roof ridge) or Quereinhäuser (combination residential and commercial houses divided for these two purposes down the middle, perpendicularly to the street), and also workers’ houses. Many farmhouses have been converted to purely residential use. Small new development areas mark the village's outskirts. To the south lies the graveyard. The Sulzhof, lying on both sides of the Sulzbach, was originally made up of a few farmhouses and an inn. These buildings, too, have mostly been converted to purely residential use.

== History ==
=== Antiquity ===
The countryside around Hohenöllen was settled as early as prehistoric times, bearing witness to which are archaeological finds, such as one made in 1964 in Hob (a rural cadastral name) by a student, a stone hatchet made of hard, grey stone with a pointed knob and offset sides, and with a length of 9.4 cm. Another such hatchet was found in some heaped earth near a farm. The earth itself had been heaped there more than one hundred years earlier, having likewise been dug up in Hob. Roman finds have not come to light in Hohenöllen itself, unlike what has been found in neighbouring villages. The road running by the village is often called a Roman road.

=== Middle Ages ===
An exact date for Hohenöllen's founding cannot be determined; the vanished and later revived centre of Sulzbach (now called the Sulzhof) might well have been older. It is believed to have arisen in the 8th or 9th century, whereas the village itself arose only in the 10th or 11th century. Both centres lay in the Nahegau and passed to the County of Veldenz when this became independent in the early 12th century. In 1268, Hohenöllen had its first documentary mention in Goswin Widder's book about Electoral Palatinate, in which he refers to a lecture by the Heidelberg historian Grollius that mentioned that in that year, Craffto von Boxberg, whose wife was a Countess of Veldenz, leased, among other things, his holdings in Hohenhelden (Hohenöllen) to the Counts of Landsberg. The transaction was linked to the Veldenz transition from the older line to the newer line. Both Hohenöllen and Sulzbach were later named repeatedly in Veldenz documents. In 1431, Henchin Wolf von Spanheim acknowledged that he had received a series of holdings from Count Friedrich III of Veldenz, among them certain taxation rights in Hohenhelde. That same year, Henchin Wolf announced to the Count that his late brother had sold these income rights. A year later, Count Friedrich granted Henchin leave to transfer the tithes from Hohenhelde to his wife Fyhe von Eyche as a widow's estate. Then, in 1438, Henchin sold the Count the estate, which had since become his own, along with the income rights in Hohenhelde. As early as the 14th century, Hohenöllen was described as an Amt seat. The village was seat of an Unteramt within the Veldenz, and later Zweibrücken, Oberamt of Meisenheim. The Unteramt seat was later moved to Einöllen.

==== Sulzbach ====
Sulzbach, on the other hand, was home to nobles, such as a Rudolf von Soltzbach in 1387. It is often hard to tell whether the lords took their name from the local place or from the like-named and likewise vanished village of Sulzbach that once lay within Bedesbach’s current limits. In 1444, the newer line of the Counts of Veldenz died out in the male line. The last count's daughter Anna had married King Ruprecht's son Count Palatine Stephan. By uniting his own Palatine holdings with the now otherwise heirless County of Veldenz – his wife had inherited the county, but not her father's title – and by redeeming the hitherto pledged County of Zweibrücken, Stephan founded a new County Palatine, as whose comital residence he chose the town of Zweibrücken: the County Palatine – later Duchy – of Palatinate-Zweibrücken. It was likely sometime before 1500 that the village of Sulzbach vanished. It is unlikely to have happened during Count Palatine Ludwig I's (Ludwig the Black's) warlike disputes. It is assumed, rather, that it was an epidemic that put an end to the village.

=== Modern times ===
From 1544, the text of a Weistum (a Weistum – cognate with English wisdom – was a legal pronouncement issued by men learned in law in the Middle Ages and early modern times) from Hohenöllen has been preserved. Hardship and woe were brought to the village by the Thirty Years' War and the Plague. Further suffering came in the late 17th century with French King Louis XIV’s wars of conquest. In 1672, eleven families were once again living in the village, making Hohenöllen one of the biggest villages in the greater area. Hohenöllen belonged to the County Palatine of Zweibrücken until it became part of Electoral Palatinate in 1768. The instrument whereby this happened was the Selz-Hagenbach Treaty, also known as the Schwetzingen Compromise, under whose terms Zweibrücken exchanged a series of villages for another series of hitherto Electoral Palatinate villages, the former series comprising mainly the Zweibrücken villages in the Schultheißerei of Einöllen with Hohenöllen, the then town of Odernheim, Frankweiler, Niederhausen, Hochstätten and Melsheim (now in France), and the latter series comprising the Electoral Palatinate Ämter of Selz and Hagenbach (whose like-named seats today lie in France and Germany respectively). The seat of the Unteramt was now Wolfstein, which belonged to the Electoral Palatinate Oberamt of Kaiserslautern. Nevertheless, this arrangement lasted only a bit less than three decades before the whole feudal system was swept away. Goswin Widder, who about 1788 published a four-volume work about all Electoral Palatinate places, put together the following description: “Hohenöllen lies one and a half hours down from Wolfstein on the Lauter’s right bank. … A quarter hour to the side lies a considerable farm, called Sulzhof. Including this, the population of 41 families, which comprise 224 souls, is great. Besides a school, there are 33 townsmen’s houses and common houses. The municipal area contains 978 Morgen of cropfields, 100 Morgen of vineyards, 6 Morgen of gardens, 80 Morgen of meadows, 308 Morgen of forest. This last belongs partly to the municipality, partly to the Baron of Fürstenwärther and a few subjects, also at the Sulzhof. They are subordinate to the forestry duties of the forester at Katzweiler.”

==== Recent times ====
French Revolutionary troops were operating in the Western Palatinate beginning in 1793 as the old ruling structures were being dissolved bit by bit. In 1798, the inhabitants of Hohenöllen were under orders to set up a Liberty pole, but they refused to do so. In 1801, the German lands on the Rhine’s left bank were annexed to the French Republic. Hohenöllen now belonged to the Mairie (“Mayoralty”) of Lauterecken, the Canton of Lauterecken, the Arrondissement of Kaiserslautern and the Department of Mont-Tonnerre (or Donnersberg in German). In 1814, the French were driven out. A commission made up of Prussians, Bavarians and Austrians administered the area until eventually, the Baierischer Rheinkreis (“Bavarian Rhine District”) was founded, later known as the Rheinpfalz (“Rhenish Palatinate”). The Congress of Vienna awarded this territory to Bavaria in 1816. Within the Rheinpfalz, Hohenöllen belonged to the Bürgermeisterei (“Mayoralty”) of Lauterecken, the Canton of Lauterecken and the Landkommissariat of Kusel. From the Landkommissariat later arose the Bezirksamt, and then the Landkreis (district). In the late 1920s and early 1930s, the Nazi Party (NSDAP) became quite popular in Hohenöllen. In the 1928 Reichstag elections, 51.8% of the local votes went to Adolf Hitler’s party, but by the 1930 Reichstag elections, this had shrunk to 45.7%. By the time of the 1933 Reichstag elections, though, after Hitler had already seized power, local support for the Nazis had swollen to 64.9%. Hitler's success in these elections paved the way for his Enabling Act of 1933 (Ermächtigungsgesetz), thus starting the Third Reich in earnest. Even after the First World War, Hohenöllen belonged to Bavaria, although it was no longer a kingdom now that the last king, and of course the Kaiser, had abdicated. After the Second World War, the Palatinate was separated from Bavaria and became part of the then newly founded state of Rhineland-Palatinate. In the course of administrative restructuring in the state, the old administrative structures were dissolved, and in early 1972, Hohenöllen, along with the Sulzhof, passed as an Ortsgemeinde to the newly founded Verbandsgemeinde of Lauterecken.

=== Population development ===
Even into the 20th century, most inhabitants in Hohenöllen earned their livelihoods in agriculture. This reality has, however, undergone a fundamental shift since then. Today, 95% of those in the workforce must now seek work elsewhere, outside the village. Hohenöllen is thus no longer a farming village. Even when it was, though, there were other ways to earn a living than by farming. There were jobs in mining and quarrying, and one could also become a Wandermusikant, or travelling musician (see the Hinzweiler article for more about this). According to 1906 statistics, 65 musicians from Hohenöllen were travelling the world plying their trade at the time. The population figures broke the 500 mark as early as the early 19th century, peaking around the turn of the 20th century. Since then, the trend has been towards a steady fall in numbers. Commuters go to jobs in, among other places, Kaiserslautern, Wolfstein, Kusel, Lauterecken and Meisenheim.

The following table shows population development over the centuries for Hohenöllen, with some figures broken down by religious denomination:

Year	1788	1825	1835	1871	1905	1939	1961	1998	2010
Total	222	420	507	455	555	457	488	435	396
Catholic		69					54
Evangelical		351					434

=== Municipality’s names ===
The second part of the name, —öllen, developed out of the Middle High German word helde (Modern High German: Halde), meaning “heap” or “mound”, referring to the steep slope between the village and the Lauter valley. The first part of the name, Hohen—, is a declined form of the adjective hoch (“high”). Thus, the village's name can be taken to mean “Settlement behind the steep slope”. The link with the earlier form, helde, can be seen in some of the name's earlier forms: Hohenhelde (1268), Hoynhelden daz Ampt (1387), Honellen (1565).

The Sulzhof, an outlying centre of Hohenöllen, was originally a village in its own right, named Sulzbach. The Sulz— may have referred to a salty spring, or perhaps to a boggy forest floor. Former names include Solzbach (1321) and Wüst solzbach (1543). Wüst means “forsaken” or “waste”; by 1543, the village had been given up.

=== Vanished villages ===
Sulzbach was already being described as a downfallen village in the 16th century, and may well have been uninhabited for 200 years before rising once again as the Sulzhof.

== Religion ==
Hohenöllen originally belonged to the Glan chapter in the Archbishopric of Mainz. The Amt of Hohenhelden formed a parish together with the mother church in Tiefenbach, which was tended by the Order of Saint John from Meisenheim. With the introduction of the Reformation, at the Prince-Bishop-Elector's decree, everyone became first Lutheran, and then, as of 1588, Calvinist. After the Thirty Years' War, villagers could once again choose their faith, and also, adherents of any Christian denomination were free to come and settle. During Electoral Palatinate times, the Catholic faith was once again to be promoted (but not enforced). Nevertheless, most people kept their Reformed (Calvinist) beliefs. About 1700, the Reformed parish seat was moved to Einöllen. Lutherans belonged to the Church of Roßbach (nowadays an outlying centre of Wolfstein). Today, about 80% of the villagers are Protestant. The Catholic Christians now officially belong to the Church of Reipoltskirchen, but usually attend services in Lauterecken. There are no Jews living in Hohenöllen.

== Politics ==
=== Municipal council ===
The council is made up of 8 council members, who were elected by majority vote at the municipal election held on 7 June 2009, and the honorary mayor as chairman.

=== Mayor ===
Hohenöllen's mayor is Hans Jürgen Reule.

=== Coat of arms ===
The municipality's arms might be described thus: Per bend sable a plough bendwise Or and argent a lyre azure.

The charge on the dexter (armsbearer's right, viewer's left) side, the plough, hearkens back to the days when Hohenöllen was a farming village. The charge on the sinister (armsbearer's left, viewer's right) side, the lyre, refers to the former industry of travelling musicians, Musikantentum. The arms have been borne since 1979 when they were approved by the now defunct Rheinhessen-Pfalz Regierungsbezirk administration in Neustadt an der Weinstraße.

== Culture and sightseeing ==
=== Buildings ===
The following are listed buildings or sites in Rhineland-Palatinate’s Directory of Cultural Monuments:

- Vordergasse 2, 4, 7 – former school; no. 4 one-floor plastered building with ridge turret, 1829; no. 2 addition with dwelling and teaching room, 1849, architect Johann Schmeisser, Kusel; no. 7 one-floor building with hipped roof with ridge turret, 1898, architect Regional Master Builder Kleinhans
- Warriors’ memorial for the fallen of both world wars, south of the village – sandstone-block stele, 1922 by sculptor Strauß, Lauterecken, expanded in 1952

=== Regular events ===
Hohenöllen holds its kermis (church consecration festival, locally known as the Kerb) on the second weekend in September. On the Monday, two “Lulus” show up, young men wearing masks who pull the wagon of the Straußmädchen and Straußbuben (“bouquet girls and boys”). The custom supposedly goes back to a spoof on Napoleon.

=== Clubs ===
Hohenöllen is a village known for its community spirit, and with the following clubs, which reflect that:

- Männergesangverein 1881 — men's singing club
- Radfahrverein “Blitz” — cycling
- FC Blau-Weiß Hohenöllen mit Spielgemeinschaft SG Herrenberg Hohenöllen — football club
- Förderverein “Freiwillige Feuerwehr” — volunteer fire brigade promotional association
- Krieger- und Militärverein — warrior and military club

== Economy and infrastructure ==
=== Economic structure ===
Besides agricultural operations, which included winegrowing and fruitgrowing in earlier times, Hohenöllen had the customary craft occupations in the village itself, along with the St. Antonius colliery, in business from 1777 to sometime towards 1900; it was quite small, employing about five workers. There was also a limestone mine, and for the village's own needs, there were also stone quarries. The village still has one inn (at the Sulzhof). Further independent businesses are no longer to be found here. The village is therefore a typical country community with a very great number of commuters living in it.

=== Education ===
The first schoolhouse was built sometime about 1770 as a simple timber-frame building for a winter school (a school geared towards an agricultural community's practical needs, held in the winter, when farm families had a bit more time to spare). This schoolhouse was torn down in the early 19th century, and in 1829, on the same spot, a new schoolhouse was built. In the beginning, both Evangelical and Catholic schoolchildren were taught together. Since not all the children could be taught in the single room, the municipality acquired a private house in 1843 in which an assistant would take over teaching for the few Catholic schoolchildren. Because two classes of greatly differing sizes (about 60:15) would then arise, the municipality opposed the government's plans. Thus it became possible for the actual schoolteacher to teach in the big class and for a trainee to take the smaller class in the auxiliary space. About 1870, the schoolhouse was given a ridge turret in which a bell could be hung. A new schoolhouse in the Classicist style was built in 1899 with one classroom for the primary school pupils, while the upper classes remained at the old schoolhouse. Beginning in the 1922/1923 school year, the two classes switched places. About 1969, the two-class Hohenöllen school was dissolved. The upper class went to the Hauptschule in Lauterecken while the lower class went to the Lohnweiler-Heinzenhausen primary school. The old Hohenöllen schoolhouse passed into private ownership. The so-called new schoolhouse was taken over by the municipality for its own requirements.

=== Transport ===
Hohenöllen lies on Landesstraße 383, branching off which in the middle of the village is Kreisstraße 51, leading towards Reipoltskirchen. The nearest Autobahn interchanges are the ones at Kaiserslautern and Kusel, each some 25 km away. To the west runs Bundesstraße 270. The nearest railway station is Lohnweiler-Heinzenhausen on the Lautertalbahn, some 5 km away.
