= Cronenberg, Rhineland-Palatinate =

Cronenberg
- Municipality
- Coat of arms

- Location of Cronenberg within Kusel district
- Interactive map of Cronenberg
- Location within Germany Location within Rhineland-Palatinate
- Coordinates: 49°39′07″N 7°37′29″E
- Country: Germany
- State: Rhineland-Palatinate
- District: Kusel
- Municipal assoc.: Lauterecken-Wolfstein

Government
  - Mayor (2019–24): Hannelore Eckel

Area
  - Total: 2.65 km^{2} (1.02 sq mi)
- Elevation: 250 m (820 ft)

Population (2025-12-31)
  - Total: 150
  - Density: 57/km^{2} (150/sq mi)
- Time zone: UTC+01:00 (CET)
  - Summer (DST): UTC+02:00 (CEST)
- Postal codes: 67744
- Dialling codes: 06382
- Vehicle registration: KUS

Cronenberg is an Ortsgemeinde – a municipality belonging to a Verbandsgemeinde, a kind of collective municipality – in the Kusel district in Rhineland-Palatinate, Germany. It belongs to the Verbandsgemeinde of Lauterecken-Wolfstein.

== Geography ==
=== Location ===
The municipality lies in the North Palatine Uplands in the Western Palatinate on a raised flat-topped ridge between the Sulzbach and Odenbach valleys, at a steep slope dropping off into the Sulzbach valley. Cronenberg lies east of Lauterecken at an elevation of some 280 m above sea level. The Sulzbach itself rises near Hohenöllen and near Medard it empties into the river Glan. The gentle elevations around the village reach up to some 300 m above sea level. The municipal area measures 265 ha, of which roughly 2.5 ha is settled and 80 ha is wooded.

=== Neighbouring municipalities ===
Cronenberg borders in the northeast on the municipalities of Adenbach and Odenbach, in the east on the municipality of Ginsweiler, in the south on the municipality of Hohenöllen, in the west on the town of Lauterecken and in the northwest on the municipality of Medard.

=== Municipality’s layout ===
Cronenberg has a relatively tightly packed core, but with looser building development on the western and southern outskirts. The graveyard lies to the north of the village.

== History ==
=== Antiquity ===
In neither the countryside within municipal limits nor in the village itself have any prehistoric archaeological finds come to light. Nonetheless, it is known that mankind was in the Cronenberg area in prehistoric times from the many finds that have been unearthed elsewhere, in neighbouring villages. Discovered long ago in the rural area known as Röhlingstränk south of the village were two columns of a former Roman building, one of which is still in existence and today stands in the yard at an agricultural estate.

=== Middle Ages ===
Cronenberg lay originally in the free Imperial Domain (Reichsland), out of which various areas were carved so that Frankish kings could donate them to ecclesiastical lords. In Cronenberg's case, the village belonged to a landhold held by the Bishopric of Verdun around the estate of Medard. Descendants of the Counts of the Nahegau founded the County of Veldenz in 1127, to which this estate of Medard also belonged as a Vogtei. Cronenberg was therefore mentioned many times in the Counts’ documents, and the village was also a seat of nobles who were in the Counts’ service. In 1358, Cronenberg had its first documentary mention in one such document, sealed as it was by Walter von Cronenberg. The document itself dealt with the assessment of lands in Berkersheim, which is nowadays a constituent community of Frankfurt, which Count Georg I of Veldenz had given lesser nobles. Cropping up in other Veldenz documents were the knights Frank von Cronenberg (1361 and 1369), Johann von Cronenberg (1387), Folkenant von Cronenberg (1393) and a younger Walter (1411). In 1444, the original County of Veldenz was brought to an end by the last count's death – he had no male heir – and it thereby passed to his son-in-law Stephen, Count Palatine of Simmern-Zweibrücken, creating the new County Palatine of Zweibrücken, which in time came to be regarded as a duchy. Cronenberg remained part of this state until the traditional feudal order was swept away in the wake of the French Revolution in the late 18th century.

In the newer regional history it is disputed whether the 1358 document, which refers to what is today a suburb of Frankfurt am Main, really does refer to Cronenberg, rather than perhaps the town of Kronberg im Taunus. The confusion would have to involve other documents, too, that the historian Pöhlmann ascribes to Cronenberg. It is, though, not altogether clear to what extent the Counts of Veldenz issued documents dealing with places that, after all, lay well beyond their territory (Frankfurt lies almost 90 km away from Cronenberg).

=== Modern times ===
Wolfgang, Count Palatine of Zweibrücken, introduced the Reformation as early as 1537. The 17th century was marked to a great degree by war, namely the Thirty Years' War and French King Louis XIV's wars of conquest. Even worse than these to this rather remote village, however, were the famine and sicknesses that struck it. Generally, an unimaginable demoralization took hold of the people. Population figures swiftly sank, but rose again in the latter half of the 17th century. There were no territorial changes until the outbreak of the French Revolution.

==== Recent times ====
During the time of the French Revolution, and the Napoleonic era that followed, the German lands on the Rhine’s left bank were annexed by France. The old territorial boundaries were thus swept away. The new administrative boundaries that were drawn put Cronenberg in the Mairie (“Mayoralty”) of Lauterecken, the Canton of Lauterecken, the Arrondissement of Kaiserslautern and the Department of Mont-Tonnerre (or Donnersberg in German). After the victories scored by the united Prussian, Russian and Austrian troops over Napoleon, Blücher managed to cross the Rhine on New Year's Night 1814, and the French withdrew from the annexed German lands on the left bank. Cronenberg passed in 1816 to the bayerischer Rheinkreis (“Bavarian Rhine District”), a new exclave awarded to the Kingdom of Bavaria by the Congress of Vienna. The village then belonged to the Bürgermeisterei (“Mayoralty”) of Lauterecken in the canton of the same name and the Landkommissariat of Kusel.

In the early 1930s, the Nazi Party (NSDAP) was quite popular in Cronenberg. In the 1930 Reichstag elections, 42.9% of the local votes went to Adolf Hitler’s party. By the time of the 1933 Reichstag elections, after Hitler had already seized power, local support for the Nazis had swollen to 97.1%. Hitler’s success in these elections paved the way for his Enabling Act of 1933 (Ermächtigungsgesetz), thus starting the Third Reich in earnest. Once the state of Rhineland-Palatinate had been founded after the Second World War and the Palatinate had been split away from Bavaria, the broader territorial arrangements did not change at first. Only with administrative restructuring in 1968 did Cronenberg pass as an Ortsgemeinde to the newly founded Verbandsgemeinde of Lauterecken, with effect from 1972.

=== Population development ===
The village of Cronenberg has remained rurally structured to this day. The greater part of the population worked until the Second World War in agriculture. Today, most members of the workforce earn their livelihoods outside the village, and thus the village presents itself as a rural residential community.

Cronenberg during the Middle Ages was likely made up of only one great feudal estate with a few farmers and their workers. During the 19th century, the population rose markedly until by the end of that century, the village had more than 300 inhabitants. In the years leading up to the Second World War, though, the population figure shrank, only to rise again somewhat, temporarily, with the arrival of ethnic Germans driven out of Germany’s former eastern territories. The great drop to a figure of 164 is, of course, not promising, and can be attributed to the village’s unfavourable transport links.

The following table shows population development over the centuries for Cronenberg, with some figures broken down by religious denomination:

Year	1736	1825	1835	1871	1905	1939	1961	1999
Total	12 families	190	240	304	298	253	279	193
Catholic			3				9
Evangelical			187				270

=== Municipality’s name ===
The mountaintop Cronenberg is a relatively late founding whose placename prefix was originally Kranich. Although the modern meaning for this word in German is “crane”, the context is likelier to make the meaning here “crown”, for Cronenberg “crowns” a mountain (Berg in German). Whatever the original meaning was, the name now has the prefix Cronen—, which does actually resemble the modern German word for “crown”, namely Krone. It is unknown whether Cronenberg began as a settlement near a small castle, but this cannot be ruled out. The name first appeared in a 1388 document (Walter von Cronenberg) and hardly changed at all through all the other instances in old documents.

=== Vanished villages ===
A writer named Häberle named a place in connection with Cronenberg, called Leckenberg, about which nothing further is known.

== Religion ==
From the Early Middle Ages, Cronenberg belonged to the Glan Catholic chapter. After Wolfgang, Count Palatine of Zweibrücken, introduced the Reformation into the Duchy about 1537, all the villagers had to convert to Martin Luther’s teachings. Likewise, in 1586, at the Duke’s behest, there was a further conversion, this time to John Calvin’s teachings. Only after the Thirty Years' War were the people allowed to embrace Catholicism or Lutheranism once again, if Calvinism did not suit them. Of the 12 families in Cronenberg in 1736, six were Reformed and six were Lutheran. Later, in 1818, these two denominations merged in the so-called Palatine Protestant Union. Of the 190 inhabitants in Cronenberg in 1825, there were 187 Protestants and only 3 Catholics. The Evangelical inhabitants traditionally belong to the parish of Odenbach, while the Catholics are tended by the parish of Lauterecken. In 1972, a room was set up in the old schoolhouse for Evangelical worship.

== Politics ==
=== Municipal council ===
The council is made up of 6 council members, who were elected by majority vote at the municipal election held on 7 June 2009, and the honorary mayor as chairman.

=== Mayor ===
Cronenberg’s mayor is Hannelore Eckel.

=== Coat of arms ===
The municipality’s arms might be described thus: Argent issuant from base a mount of three vert, issuant from dexter base a bishop’s staff bendwise sinister azure, in dexter chief a crown of the same set with jewels Or and lined gules.

The bishop’s staff stands for the Bishopric of Verdun, which was a major landholder in the region. The tinctures are drawn from those borne by the Counts of Veldenz, who were the local lords for a lengthy period. The other two charges are canting for the municipality’s name, Cronenberg. “Crown” is Krone in German and “mountain” is Berg. The latter is actually a charge known in German heraldry as a Dreiberg.

The arms have been borne since 13 February 1980 when they were approved by the now defunct Regierungsbezirk administration in Neustadt an der Weinstraße.

== Culture and sightseeing ==
=== Buildings ===
The following are listed buildings or sites in Rhineland-Palatinate’s Directory of Cultural Monuments:

- Friedhofstraße 5 – former school; plastered building with ridge turret, Rundbogenstil, about 1840, architect possibly Johann Schmeisser, Kusel
- Friedhofstraße 7 – small estate complex, possibly from the 18th century; house, partly timber-frame, stable-barn; staircase built on, 1870
- Near Hauptstraße 15 – Roman column, sandstone

=== Regular events ===
Cronenberg holds its kermis (church consecration festival) on the third weekend in July.

== Economy and infrastructure ==
=== Economic structure ===
Until the 1960s, Cronenberg was a community characterized purely by agriculture. There are still three fulltime agricultural operations even now, one of which successfully practises direct marketing. The greater part of the population, though, are employed outside the municipality and commute daily – some up to 100 km – to their jobs. A master cabinetmaker with company offices in Medard and one metalworker have gone into business for themselves.

As early as the 18th century, a mine was in operation for a while within Cronenberg’s limits. During the 19th century, coal was mined at two collieries (Nikolausgrube and Philippsgrube) with three galleries. Even after the First World War, these pits were opened once again, albeit not for long.

=== Education ===
In the course of the 18th century, schooling in Cronenberg only ever took the form of winter school (a school geared towards an agricultural community’s practical needs, held in the winter, when farm families had a bit more time to spare). It is unknown when the first winter school opened, although records hold that by 1736, it had been open “for a number of years”. Teacher turnover at the winter schools was neverending, and classes sometimes did not last very long. Indeed, there was one year in which classes lasted only four weeks because the teacher had to teach in other villages as well. The winter teacher Metgier, who was very poor and never even had a pair of shoes to his name, and who had suffered the indignity of being driven out of the village of Breitenheim, came in 1735 to Cronenberg. From the ecclesiastical estate administration he received, at first, alms, but then he was to be given as remuneration for each winter 2 Gulden and 1 or 2 Malter of grain. The municipality, though, would only pay in kind. Eventually a grant came from the Disibodenberg Monastery's treasury. In 1748, the villagers built their first schoolhouse, and also applied to the monastery for monies to maintain a school. For a time, Cronenberg was indeed described within the parish of Odenbach as the place with a permanent winter school. Names are known for the following winter teachers in the latter half of the 18th century: Peter Glück (1750), Adam Wißbügler (1757), Peter Mohr from Becherbach (1758), Joh. Philipp Stolz from Ginsweiler (1763), Joh. Hunsinger (about 1765), Peter Demmel from Roth (1785), Georg Paulus (1792). Demmel was described as a “particularly fine person”, because he stayed in the village for several years. There were also complaints, however, about the common incidence of truancy, foremost among whose causes was the practice among some poorer families of sending their children out to beg. A second schoolhouse was built about 1840. After the local school was dissolved about 1970, a room was set up in the schoolhouse in 1972 for Evangelical church services, for the Evangelicals had no church of their own. Today, primary school pupils and Hauptschule students attend their respective schools in Lauterecken. Nearby Gymnasien are to be found in Lauterecken and Meisenheim. The nearest university town is Kaiserslautern.

=== Transport ===
Cronenberg lies on Kreisstraße (District Road) 40, which between Ginsweiler (Odenbach valley) and the Sulzbach valley links Landesstraße 382 with Kreisstraße 39. The Autobahn interchanges are all rather far away (Kaiserslautern 30 km, Kusel 40 km, Wörrstadt 45 km). To the northwest runs Bundesstraße 420. Serving Lauterecken, 4 km away, is a railway station on the Lautertalbahn.

== Clubs ==
- SG Ginsweiler/Cronenberg (sport club)
- Landfrauenverein (Countrywomen's club)
- Shooting club
- Fire brigade promotional association
