= Carl von Münstermann =

German engineer and land improvement officer

Carl von Münstermann (December 20, 1843 in Werne - 20 September 1930 in Berlin-Wilmersdorf) was a German engineer and land improvement officer. He was a professor of culture and technology at the Agricultural University of Berlin (Landwirtschaftliche Hochschule Berlin).
