= Agricultural University of Berlin =

Former agricultural university in Germany

- Landwirtschaftliche Hochschule Berlin
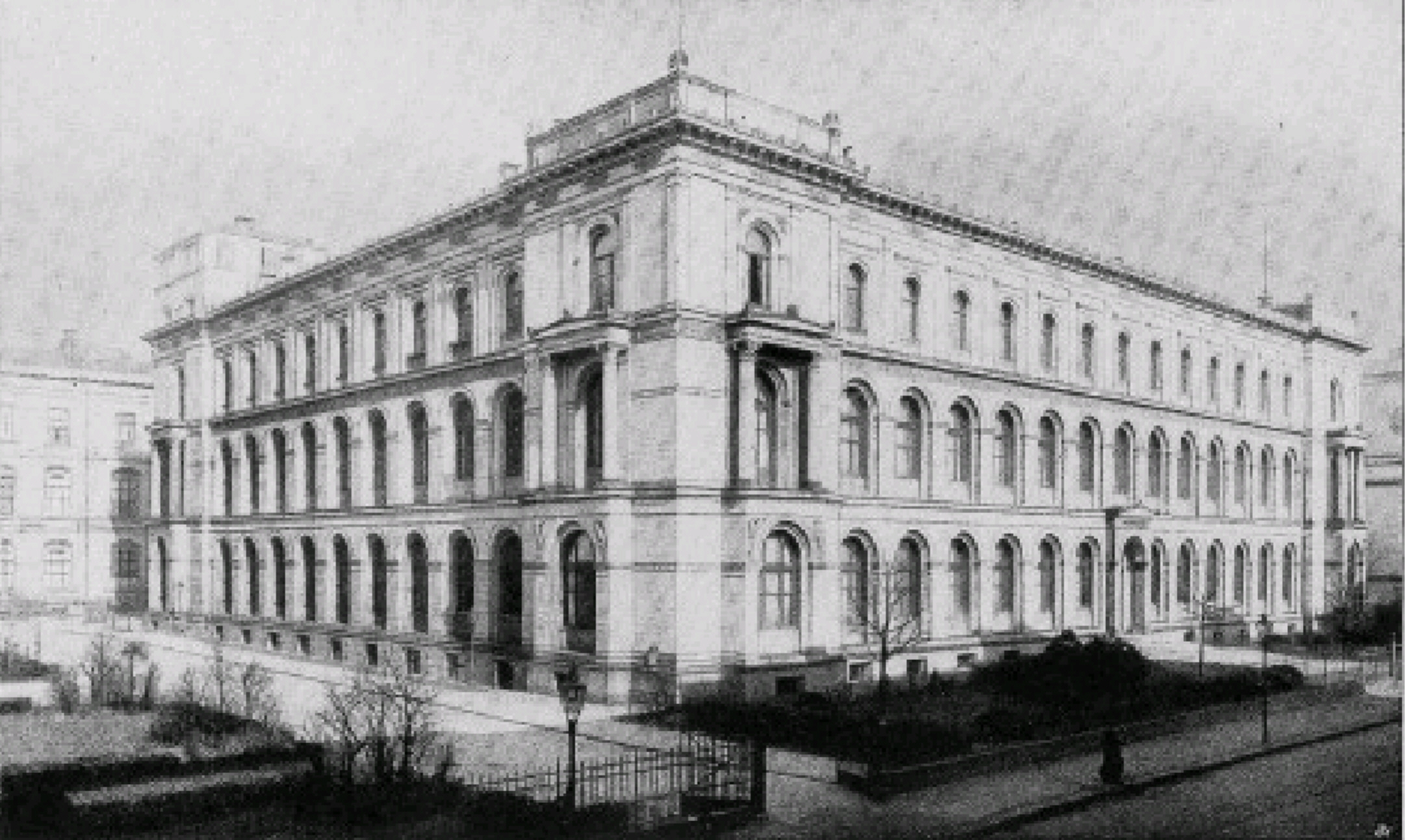
- Building of the Royal Agricultural University of Berlin in the Invalidenstraße
- Type: Public university
- Active: 14 February 1881–1934
- Location: Berlin, Germany; 52.52970°N 13.37822°E

The Agricultural University of Berlin (German: Landwirtschaftliche Hochschule Berlin) was an agricultural university in Berlin, Germany. Established in 1881, it was closed in 1934, and incorporated as a faculty into the Humboldt University of Berlin.

== History ==
Academic teaching in agricultural science began in Germany only after the publishing of Grundsätze der deutschen Landwirtschaft (Principles of the German Agriculture) by Johann Beckmann (1739–1811) in 1779. After the foundation of the first agricultural institute in Celle, establishment of several educational institutions in this field followed in Germany.

Mid-1860s, the then Prussian Minister of Agriculture, Count Heinrich Friedrich August von Itzenplitz (1799–1883), set up an agricultural institute in Berlin, which was subordinated to the ministry, and was affiliated to the university. The institute was initially housed in a private home in the Behrensstraße, and then moved to the Dorotheenstraße in 1873.

On 14 February 1881, the Royal Agricultural University (Königliche Landwirtschaftliche Hochschule) was founded by combining the institute and an 1867–established agricultural museum. The university moved in a monumental three-storey building in the Invalidenstraße adjacent to the building of Chemical Institute.

In 1906, the university was divided in three faculties or departments for agriculture, geodesy and agricultural commerce. In 1929, the university expanded with the foundation of the Department of Horticulture, the first of its sort in Germany. Curriculum was in agriculture, agricultural technology, natural science, political science and jurisprudence. Graduates were awarded the title "Diplom-Landwirt" (B.Sc. Agronomy). The possibility of carrying out doctoral studies was offered as well.

Although the name of the university was changed to Agricultural University of Berlin (Landwirtschaftliche Hochschule Berlin) with the fall of the monarchy in Germany by November 1918, the scientific teaching and research continued. Finally in 1934 following the Nazi regime's takeover, the Agricultural University of Berlin was closed and incorporated as a Faculty of Agriculture and Horticulture (German: Landwirtschaftlich-Gärtnerische Fakultät) at the Frederick William University of Berlin, which was later renamed to Humboldt University of Berlin (German: Humboldt-Universität zu Berlin). After World War II, Humboldt University and so the faculty fell to East Berlin in the territory of Soviet-controlled East Germany. Following the German reunification, the Institute of Farming (German: Hochschulinstitut für Landbau) at Technische Universität Berlin was incorporated into the Faculty of Agriculture at the Humboldt University in 1992, which was renamed to Faculty of Agriculture and Horticulture (Landwirtschaftlich-Gärtnerische Fakultät) in 1993.

Since its founding in 1881, the university was also home to the collections of the former Berlin Agricultural Museum.

== Building ==
The three-storey building was constructed between 1876 and 1880. It is part of a three-building complex designed by August Tiede (1834–1911) on the ground of the Royal Iron Foundry (Königliche Eisengießerei) at Neuer Tor in Berlin. The two other buildings in the group house the Museum für Naturkunde (Museum für Naturkunde) and the Geological Institute and Mining Academy (Geologische Landesanstalt und Bergakademie).

The building is decorated with a stone facade in the Renaissance Revival architecture (Neo-Renaissance). The windows are all round-arched and only the top floor windows are separated by pilasters. The building is today a listed one.

The marble busts in the foyer feature the agronomist Albrecht Daniel Thaer (1752–1828), the economist Johann Heinrich von Thünen (1783–1850), the agricultural policymaker Hugo Thiel (1839–1918) and the agricultural machinery manufacturer Heinrich Ferdinand Eckert (1819–1875). On the left wand of the foyer, an artwork made of 30 tiles shows the model plantation of Thaer in Möglin.

Inside the building, there is an atrium of 800 m^{2} (8,600 sq ft), one of the biggest in Berlin. In the middle of the inner court, a monument of Thaer is erected, created and began by Christian Daniel Rauch (1777–1857) and later completed by Hugo Hagen (1818–1871). A sculpture of the Royal Iron Foundry features the rural life.

== Faculty ==
- Carl von Münstermann (1843–1930), professor of culture and technology
