= Reipoltskirchen Castle =

German castle

- Burg Reipoltskirchen
- Reipoltskirchen
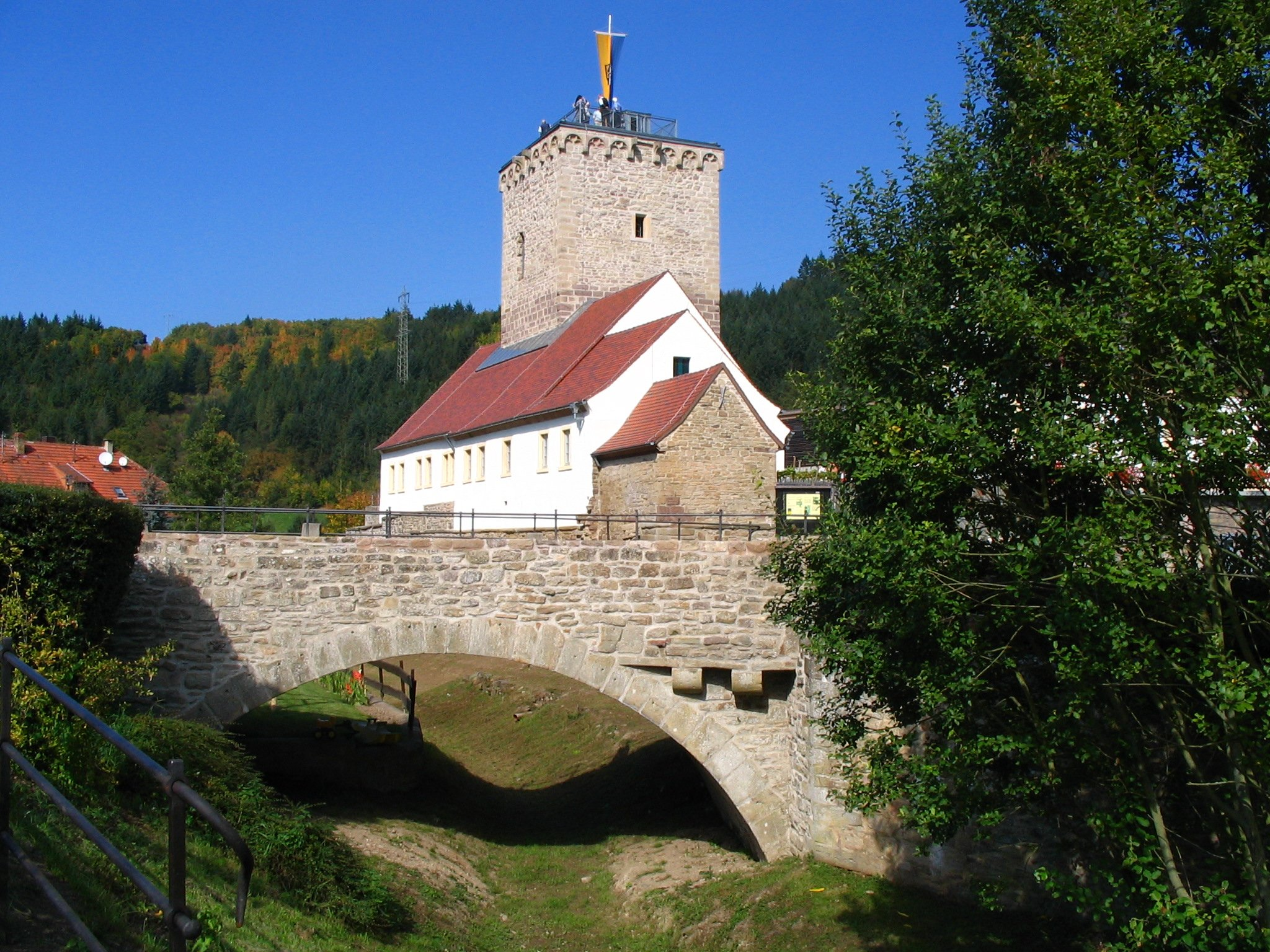
- Reipoltskirchen Water Castle

Site information
- Type: lowland castle and settlement
- Code: DE-RP
- Condition: largely preserved

Location
- Coordinates: 49°38′6.5″N 7°39′48.7″E
- Height: 208 m above sea level (NHN)

Site history
- Built: 1100 to 1200
- Materials: sandstone

Garrison information
- Occupants: nobility

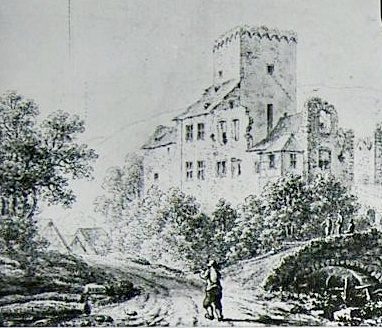
Peter Gayer, Reipoltskirchen Castle around 1830 (second oldest known depiction)

Reipoltskirchen Castle (German: Wasserburg Reipoltskirchen) is a water castle in the parish of Reipoltskirchen in the county of Kusel in the German state of Rhineland-Palatinate. It is one of the best preserved water castles in the Palatinate region.

The castle stands at a height of 208 metres above sea level (NN) on the site of an artificially created earth hillock around a rock spur on the Odenbach river.

== History ==
As early as 1198, the first related nobleman, Meffried of Reipoltskirchen, is mentioned, so the castle could have existed at that time. However, the first record of a castle in Reipoltskirchen, castro Ripoltskirchen, does not appear until 1276, when the fortification came into the possession of Theoderich (Dietrich) of Hohenfels. The "von Hohenfels" were a branch of the lords of Bolanden, who later called themselves "lords of Reipoltskirchen" in a new branch of the Hohenfels family. When the Hohenfels family seat was destroyed in 1351, the family of the older line probably temporarily sought refuge with their cousin, Conrad, in the water castle of Reipoltskirchen. The last Hohenfels of the older line sold the remainder of his estate due to poverty and "meagre sustenance" (notturfft lipplicher narung) and had to spend the rest of his life in a house belonging to the Neuenbaumburg near his relatives, the Raugrave of Bolanden.

In 1401, Nicholas Vogt of Hunolstein used the castle, which was part of the dower of his wife, Ida of Erbach, as a base during an armed confrontation with Duke Charles of Lorraine. The duke besieged the castle and captured it. Nicholas, who also called himself Lord of Hunolstein, and his stepson, Eberhard of Hohenfels, Lord of Reipoltskirchen, concluded an expiatory treaty with Duke Charles on 27 March 1401. Temporarily, a quarter of the castle and estate had to be ceded to Lorraine. The Vogt of Hunolstein experienced additional humiliation and was appointed as administrator of the Lorraine share in the castle (Sloss Ripoltzkirchen).

At the beginning of the 16th century the castle was probably expanded by the brothers John (ally of Francis of Sickingen) and Wolfgang of Hohenfels-Reipoltskirchen. John II, to whom this extension had hitherto been attributed, was still a child at the time and only appears in the records from 1538 to 1570.

The von Hohenfels line died out with John III (grandson of John II) in 1602. In accordance with a 1603 clause in the will by Countess Amalia, the mother of the last member of the Hohenfels family, the castle passed after her death in 1608 to her two brothers Emich and Sebastian, counts of Daun-Falkenstein. However, these two passed away without any descendants entitled to inherit (living heirs), so the castle and the estate of Countess Amalia went to her two nephews, sons of her sister, Sidonia, the Swedish counts John-Casimir and Sten (Steino) of Löwenhaupt-Rasburg, cousins (great cousins) of the Swedish king, Gustavus II Adolphus of the House of Wasa. Stens's half of the castle and estate went to the counts of Manderscheid-Kail by marriage and inheritance. In 1730, Count Francis William Caspar was able to acquire this half share from Hillesheim. The other half of the estate of John-Casimir remained in the possession of the counts of Löwenhaupt-Rasburg until 1763 and was subsequently sold to Count Philip Andrew of Ellrodt.

In 1770/1773, an attempt was made to sell Ellrodt's share of the estate to Palatinate-Zweibrücken, which failed, however, because of unnoted pre-emptive rights.

In 1777/1778 the estate was managed by Count William Ernest Godfrey of Hillesheim and Princess Caroline of Isenburg, daughter of Palatine Elector, Charles Theodore in condominium. In 1797 the property was expropriated as part of the French occupation. On 30 November 1808, the castle grounds and its buildings were auctioned off to Karl Baumann, the Maire of Lauterecken, merchant Heinrich Puricelli and farmer Johann Bacher. A short time later, in 1836, the buildings were described as ruinous because they were partly used as quarries. Around 1830, the Speyer district archivist, Peter Gayer (1793-1836), captured the state of the castle in a sepia drawing, the second oldest known painting of the castle. The oldest depiction of the castle is by Freiherr Stephan von Stengel. It is an etching which he titled with "à ReipoldsKirchen" and signed with a French name "p. Et. de Stengel 1772 ". The castle is, depicted in a ruinous state, was probably drawn from the north. Stengel's etching could also combine views from different angles.

Most of the heart of castle site was acquired in 1988 by the county of Kusel. The castle underwent extensive renovation in 2005. Today it houses a restaurant, a registry office and an art school. The bergfried is freely accessible and has been turned into a viewing tower.

== Baronetcy of Reipoltskirchen ==
Reipoltskirchen Castle was the seat of the eponymous imperially immediate Herrschaft or baronetcy.

The Herrschaft eventually consisted of the following 15 villages:

Reipoltskirchen, Berzweiler, Dörnbach, Finkenbach, Gersweiler, Hefersweiler, Moorbach, Niederkirchen, Nußbach, Rathskirchen, Reichsthal, Rölsberg, Rudolphskirchen, Schönborn and Seelen.

== Site ==
The surviving elements of the sandstone castle are the 17-metre-high bergfried and the curtain walls. The rooms added since the 1970s are used today as an art school.

== Literature ==
- Martin Dolch, Hans-Joachim Kühn, Stefan Ulrich, Achim Wendt: Reipoltskirchen. In: Jürgen Keddigkeit, Ulrich Burkhart, Rolf Übel (eds.): Pfälzisches Burgenlexikon. Vol. 4.1. Kaiserslautern, 2007, pp. 227–240.
- Alexander Thon, Hans Reither, Peter Pohlit: "Wie Schwalben Nester an den Felsen geklebt..." Burgen in der Nordpfalz. Regensburg, 2005, ISBN 3-7954-1674-4.
- à ReipoldsKirchen 1772 - Ein Schöngeist in diplomatischen Diensten. Druckgrafik und Zeichnungen von Stephan von Stengel. Published by Henner-Wolfgang Harling et al. Mannheim, 2008. (Publications of the Reiss-Engelhorn-Museum; 32) ISBN 978-3-89735-566-8
- Urkundenbuch Hunolstein II., No. 120, pp. 108 ff.
