= Nußbach, Rhineland-Palatinate =

Nußbach
- Municipality
- Coat of arms

- Location of Nußbach within Kusel district
- Interactive map of Nußbach
- Location within Germany Location within Rhineland-Palatinate
- Coordinates: 49°37′45″N 7°41′45″E
- Country: Germany
- State: Rhineland-Palatinate
- District: Kusel
- Municipal assoc.: Lauterecken-Wolfstein

Government
  - Mayor (2019–24): Ronald Schwarz

Area
  - Total: 8.11 km^{2} (3.13 sq mi)
- Elevation: 244 m (801 ft)

Population (2025-12-31)
  - Total: 543
  - Density: 67.0/km^{2} (173/sq mi)
- Time zone: UTC+01:00 (CET)
  - Summer (DST): UTC+02:00 (CEST)
- Postal codes: 67759
- Dialling codes: 06364
- Vehicle registration: KUS
- Website: www.nussbach-pfalz.de

Nußbach (or Nussbach) is an Ortsgemeinde – a municipality belonging to a Verbandsgemeinde, a kind of collective municipality – in the Kusel district in Rhineland-Palatinate, Germany. It belongs to the Verbandsgemeinde Lauterecken-Wolfstein.

== Geography ==
=== Location ===
Nußbach lies in the valley of the like-named brook, the Nußbach (“Nutbrook”), which empties into the Odenbach some two kilometres downstream from the village, in the North Palatine Uplands. It sits at an elevation of some 200 m above sea level, although outlying elevations within municipal limits reach heights of almost 450 m above sea level (Galgenkopf 305 m, Flettersberg 366 m, Erlenberg 399 m, Anzenthaler Hüberl 420 m, Sohlberg 433 m, Roßberg 448 m). The road that runs by, Landesstraße 386, links the Odenbach valley with the Alsenz valley. The municipal area measures 811 ha, of which roughly 36 ha is settled and 105 ha is wooded.

=== Neighbouring municipalities ===
Nußbach borders in the north on the municipality of Waldgrehweiler, in the northeast on the municipality of Bisterschied, in the east on the municipality of Teschenmoschel, in the southeast on the municipality of Rathskirchen, in the south on the municipality of Hefersweiler, in the southwest on the municipality of Reipoltskirchen and in the northwest on the municipality of Becherbach.

=== Municipality’s layout ===
Nußbach is a clump village lying on a broadening of the dale in the area of the so-called Dorfbach (“Village Brook”), which flows by from the Roßberg (“Steed Mountain”) and here empties into the Nußbach. The built-up area stretches almost exclusively along the Nußbach's right bank, and reaches its greatest concentration where Bachstraße, a road running alongside the Dorfbach, meets Hauptstraße (“Main Street”), which runs alongside the Nußbach. Within the village, a few architecturally noteworthy buildings are to be found. The interesting Evangelical village church was built in the Art Nouveau style in 1911–1912 to plans by Nuremberg architect Dünnbier. Across the street stands a house built in the same style. Particularly worthy of mention is the Laubenhaus or Haus Wildanger at Bachstraße 2, built as a timber-frame house. Since March 2002, it has served as the local history museum, called the Alte-Welt-Museum. Also held to be of special interest among buildings are farmhouses built as three-side estates (open at one side, bordered by buildings on the other three) or corner estates and a belltower at the former graveyard. Both the sporting ground and the new graveyard lie in the village's northwest. Nußbach is today said to be a “residential community with rural character and emergent tourism”.

== History ==
=== Antiquity ===
There have been no reports of any archaeological finds within Nußbach's limits from the Stone Age, the Bronze Age or the Iron Age. This is not to say that the area was not settled in prehistoric times, however. In Gallo-Roman times, there were certainly settlements in the area around what is now Nußbach. A Roman road led over the nearby Roßberg, on whose peak – albeit outside Nußbach's limits in the neighbouring municipality of Becherbach – and near Gangloff (a constituent community of Becherbach), Viergöttersteine (“four-god stones”, pedestals on which a Jupiter Column was customarily stood) have been unearthed. These are now kept at the Historical Museum of the Palatinate (Historisches Museum der Pfalz) in Speyer.

=== Middle Ages ===
An exact time in history when Nußbach was founded cannot be reckoned with any exactitude. It is likely that the village arose in the Early Middle Ages, perhaps in the 9th or 10th century. Nußbach originally lay in the Nahegau and thus later passed into the Rhinegraves’ and Raugraves’ ownership, making the village's history comparable to that experienced by other villages throughout the former Amt of Grumbach. Hence, Nußbach belonged as of 1140 to the Waldgraviate and beginning in 1263 to the Lordship of Dhaun-Grumbach. In 1309, Nußbach had its first documentary mention. The Rhinegraves Georg and Konrad documented their parents’ bequest of a regular income from Nußbach to the Otterberg Monastery. In 1443, Waldgrave Friedrich at Dun and Rhinegrave at the Stone (Wildgraf Friedrich zu Dun und Rheingraf zum Stein) pledged the villages around Grumbach and also the farther-flung villages of Nußbach and Bosenbach to Count Palatine Stephan of Zweibrücken and his then still living father-in-law Count Friedrich III of Veldenz. This pledge was repeated in 1447, although this time by Rhinegrave Gottfried to Duke Stephan of Palatinate-Zweibrücken (the same Stephan; Count Friedrich III by now had died). As part of the deal, Rhinegrave Gottfried reserved the right to by the territory back. It was Rhinegrave Johann zu Salm who actually exercised this option in 1477 when Duke Ludwig “the Black” resided at Zweibrücken. At this time, the provostry of Offenbach am Glan was endowed with rights in Nußbach. The monastery had to perform transport services for the Duchy of Palatinate-Zweibrücken. This duty was abolished in 1536 against a payment of 13 Malter of grain, half corn (wheat or rye) and half oats, to Duke Wolfgang of Zweibrücken. The village of Nußbach had to come up with this grain. The agreement was renewed in 1543. In 1553, Waldgrave and Rhinegrave Philipp Franz traded Nußbach, together with Schönau and half of Rudolphskirchen for Hochstetten in the Alsenz valley in the Imperial county of Reipoltskirchen under the then Baron Johann II. Thereafter, Nußbach's history was tightly bound to the Imperial county's. This lordship belonged to the Upper Rhenish Circle.

=== Modern times ===
Baron Johann II, who had been Franz von Sickingen’s contemporary, died in 1568. In the time that followed, tight bonds were forged with other counties through marriage, particularly with Leiningen-Westerburg through Johann’s daughter-in-law Amalia’s second marriage. The Imperial county, and thereby Nußbach, too, became Reformed. Through all the changes that characterized the Imperial county’s history during the 17th and 18th centuries, Nußbach always remained with the “core” Imperial county with its centre of Reipoltskirchen and thereby shared the same history as the other villages of Rathskirchen, Reichsthal, Hefersweiler, Relsberg, Morbach, Finkenbach-Gersweiler, Schönborn, Dörnbach and half of Rudolphskirchen until the lordship was dissolved in the course of the French Revolution. During this time, these villages were held wholly or partly by the following lordships: The County of Leiningen-Westerburg, the Lordship of Löwenhaupt, the Barons of Hillesheim, the Lordship of Manderscheid-Kell and the Palatinate (through Karoline von Isenburg, Elector Karl-Theodor's natural daughter).

==== Recent times ====
In 1793, French Revolutionary troops first occupied the Imperial county, along with Nußbach. The lordly holdings were absorbed into the French First Republic’s national property. Nußbach thereby belonged between 1801 and 1814 to France, administratively to the Mairie (“Mayoralty”) of Becherbach, the Canton of Lauterecken, the Arrondissement of Kaiserslautern and the Department of Mont-Tonnerre (or Donnersberg in German). In the regional new order laid out after the time of French rule by the Congress of Vienna, the village passed to the Kingdom of Bavaria, for the Palatinate had become an exclave of that state. Within this bayerischer Rheinkreis (“Bavarian Rhine District”), Nußbach at first belonged to the Bürgermeisterei (“Mayoralty”) of Becherbach, but later became the seat of its own Bürgermeisterei in the Canton of Lauterecken and the Landkommissariat of Kusel. In the late 1920s and early 1930s, the Nazi Party (NSDAP) became quite popular in Nußbach. In the 1928 Reichstag elections, none of the local votes went to Adolf Hitler’s party, but by the 1930 Reichstag elections, this had grown to 8.8%. By the time of the 1933 Reichstag elections, after Hitler had already seized power, local support for the Nazis had swollen to 39.7%. Hitler's success in these elections paved the way for his Enabling Act of 1933 (Ermächtigungsgesetz), thus starting the Third Reich in earnest. After the Second World War, Nußbach was grouped into the then newly founded state of Rhineland-Palatinate. In the course of administrative restructuring in 1968, the Bürgermeisterei was dissolved. Since 1972, Nußbach has belonged as an Ortsgemeinde to the Verbandsgemeinde of Wolfstein in the Kusel district.

=== Population development ===
In earlier times, most of Nußbach's inhabitants earned their living at agriculture. Since then, however, there has been a great shift in the local economy, and the whole workforce is now employed in other occupations. Most of them must commute elsewhere to their jobs, mainly to Kaiserslautern, Wolfstein, Lauterecken and Meisenheim. Even in these earlier times, though, there were other ways to earn a livelihood. There were the crafts, and also the mines and quarries. There were once also Jews living in the village, who enhanced the craft businesses and trade. Since days of yore, Nußbach has had more inhabitants than the neighbouring former lordly seat of Reipoltskirchen. From the early 19th century onwards, Nußbach had between 500 and 600 inhabitants. Before the First World War, great population growth set in, but this did not continue after the war. Whereas most of the Kusel district's villages saw their population levels fall after the Second World War, even after ethnic Germans driven out of Germany's former eastern territories had come to settle, in Nußbach, further population growth set in, fostered by the village's relative proximity to the regional hub, Kaiserslautern.

The following table shows population development since Napoleonic times for Nußbach, with some figures broken down by religious denomination:

| Year | 1802 | 1825 | 1835 | 1871 | 1905 | 1939 | 1961 | 1998 | 2007 |
| Total | 353 | 525 | 546 | 599 | 709 | 582 | 672 | 747 | 619 |
| Catholic | 93 | 131 | | | | | 160 |
| Lutheran | 252 | – | | | | | – |
| Reformed | 49 | – | | | | | – |
| Evangelical | – | 279 | | | | | 512 |
| Jewish | 4 | 15 | | | | | – |

NB: The 1818 Palatine Union saw the Lutheran and Reformed Churches unite into the Evangelical Church.

=== Municipality’s name ===
The name is made up of the first syllable, Nuß—, which means “nut” (but originally “walnut tree”). To the word Nuß—, the element —bach (German for “brook”) was added, and the name might originally have been given a settlement that arose at a walnut tree. Older forms of the name are Nußbach (1309, in a 1360 copy) and Noßbach (1391).

== Religion ==
Much is unknown about Nußbach's mediaeval ecclesiastical organization. As early as the 14th century, a church stood somewhere near the old graveyard that was consecrated to Saint John. Still standing now at the old graveyard, which was used until 1901, is a belltower, but this dates from the early 19th century. It is likely that the villagers had to convert to Lutheran belief even before 1553, when Nußbach still belonged to the Waldgraviate-Rhinegraviate. In the time of the Reformation, the villages of Berzweiler and Nußbach, as well as the Ausbacherhof and the Naumburgerhof (estates) near Ginsweiler, belonged to the Lutheran parish of Reipoltskirchen. Originally, the Lords of Reipoltskirchen promoted the Protestant, but after the Thirty Years' War, the Catholic faith was able to reassert itself somewhat more strongly, and all the more so once the lordship itself chose to switch back to the old belief and even promote it. The church in Reipoltskirchen, which had become Protestant in the 16th century, was yielded back to the Catholic faith about 1700, whereupon the Protestants belonged to the parish of Rathskirchen, after having been tended for a short time by the parish of Finkenbach. Franciscans from Meisenheim held church services in Reipoltskirchen. In those days, physical fights sometimes broke out between Protestant and Catholic Christians. Also belonging to the Lutheran parish of Rathskirchen, which was likely founded as early as the introduction of the Reformation in the 16th century, were from then onwards the Protestants from Nußbach. In 1821, the Protestant church authority had the ecclesiastical boundaries newly drawn. This grouped the Protestants in the municipalities of Reichsthal, Seelen, Rudolphskirchen, Nußbach and Reipoltskirchen as well as the estates of Karlshof, Ingweilerhof, Bösodenbacherhof and Ausbacherhof into the parish of Rathskirchen. Essentially, this arrangement still stands today. Only the Ausbacherhof was split away and joined with Einöllen. In the early 19th century, one fourth of Nußbach's population once again clove to Catholic belief. Protestantism was represented foremost by the Lutheran faith, while only four villagers were Calvinists. In the Union of 1818, Lutherans and Calvinists were united. The church building that was still being used by the Protestants fell into disrepair and was torn down. Evangelical Christians then attended services in Rathskirchen, while the Catholic Christians now, as before, belonged to the parish of Reipoltskirchen. In 1911–1912, a new church building was built on Hauptstraße for the Protestant community. In 1912, the new church got an organ from the firm Walcker in Ludwigsburg. A new church built in similar style was put up at about the same time in Rathskirchen. Today the Catholic Christians belong to the parish of Lauterecken.

== Politics ==
=== Municipal council ===
The council is made up of 12 council members, who were elected by majority vote at the municipal election held on 7 June 2009, and the honorary mayor as chairman.

=== Mayor ===
Nußbach's mayor is Ronald Schwarz.

=== Coat of arms ===
The German blazon reads: Von Rot und Grün durch einen silbernen Schräglinkswellenbalken geteilt, oben ein goldener Glockenturm, unten ein goldener Haselnusszweig mit zwei Haselnüssen und einem Blatt.

The municipality's arms might in English heraldic language be described thus: A bend sinister wavy argent between gules a belltower Or and vert a hazelnut twig fructed of two, foiled of one and slipped of the third.

The bend sinister wavy (diagonal wavy stripe) refers to the village's namesake brook, the Nußbach. The hazelnuts in the green field are canting for the village's name (Nuß is German for “nut”). The tinctures vert and argent (green and silver) are the ones formerly borne by the Lords of Reipoltskirchen, who were the local lords of Nußbach before the French Revolution. The municipality's belltower served a political purpose from 1811 to 1914. The bells come from Saint John’s Chapel (Johanneskapelle), which once stood at the old graveyard.

The arms have been borne since 29 March 1985 when they were approved by the Regierungsbezirk administration in Neustadt an der Weinstraße.

=== Town partnerships ===
Nußbach fosters partnerships with the following places:

- (Germany) Reifland, Erzgebirgskreis, Saxony

Since 1999, Reifland has been a constituent community (Ortsteil) of Lengefeld.

=== Struggle with neo-Nazis ===
Early in 2002, Nußbach found itself beset by a great number of members of the National Democratic Party of Germany (NPD), a neo-Nazi organization. Several hundred of these neo-Nazis “invaded” the village, causing more than muted reaction. Petitions against the NPD's activities in Nußbach were set up by former mayor Rudi Zapp in local shops and were quickly filled with signatures. When the NPD announced only a week after their nighttime gathering that they would hold a demonstration on 24 February 2002, local residents decided to stage a counterdemonstration. While the neo-Nazis held their gathering at the former public house, several hundred citizens – their numbers were bolstered by demonstrators from other nearby villages – demonstrated against them, waving banners with messages such as “Nußbach lässt sich nicht knacken” (“Nußbach will not crack”).

== Culture and sightseeing ==
=== Buildings ===
The following are listed buildings or sites in Rhineland-Palatinate’s Directory of Cultural Monuments:

- Protestant church, Hauptstraße 13 – picturesque group of buildings in Swiss chalet style, 1911/1912, architect Dünnbier, Nuremberg; furnishings, Walcker organ from 1912
- Bachstraße 2 – house with covered walk, timber-frame house, partly solid, with open loggia, about 1700, stable-barn; characterizes village’s appearance
- Hauptstraße 12 – building with half-hipped roof, Swiss chalet style, 1913, architect Dünnbier, Kaiserslautern
- Hauptstraße 42 – corner estate; house, partly timber-frame, marked 1717
- Near Hohlstraße 4 – belltower, (in modern times) marked 1811

The timber-frame house at Bachstraße 2 is the one that now houses the local history museum.

=== Regular events ===
The kermis (church consecration festival) is held on the third weekend in August.

=== Clubs ===
Cultural life is also characterized by a lively club life. Among the clubs are the Sportverein Nußbach 1931 (sport club) with a clubhouse, the volunteer fire brigade promotional association and a local chapter of the German Red Cross.

=== Museums ===
Also found in Nußbach is the Alte-Welt-Museum (“Old World Museum”), which houses old craft exhibits and, among other things, an 18th-century loom. The dedication took place on 15 March 2002, and there was an “open house” the next day for all who were interested. The museum is housed in a newly renovated timber-frame house, the Haus Wildanger at Bachstraße 2. It has a “great gallery” that can be used as extra room for exhibitions. Planning for the museum began in 1996 in the course of a village renewal programme. Weaving is a traditional craft in Nußbach, with an address book from 1877 listing six linen weavers in the village. Exhibits show how flax is woven into finished linen. In a key exhibit at the museum, ladies’ historical costume from the 19th and 20th centuries is displayed. On show in the arcade are pictures of timber-frame houses in the district, both still standing and bygone.

== Economy and infrastructure ==
=== Economic structure ===
While in earlier times agriculture was a main source of income, nowadays only 20% of the people in Nußbach earn their livelihoods by working the land. Other occupations that were available in bygone days were forestry, mining and quarrying. There were coal mines near Reipoltskirchen, Hefersweiler, Relsberg, Adenbach and Rathskirchen. It is likely that workers from Nußbach were also employed in these places. In the village itself, there were also the customary craft occupations. Found in the village today are grocery shops, a clothing shop, a pizzeria and a filling station. For a long time, there was a wildlife park near the village, but this has closed. There are plans to build a great leisure and conference centre where the old wildlife park lay, with a hotel complex, an adventure swimming pool, a riding sport centre, a shopping centre and holiday houses. Such a complex could create many jobs for villagers and others from the local area. At this time, only a few people can actually pursue their profession within the village. Most seek work in the bigger towns in the broader area.

=== Education ===
Establishing a schooling system in such a small lordly domain was something that the Lords of Reipoltskirchen could not bring off without problems. Thus, for a time, the school was trusted to the Duchy of Palatinate-Zweibrücken through its Oberamt of Meisenheim. In Bavarian times, there were originally two schools in Nußbach, one Catholic and one Protestant. Mainly on financial grounds, the two schools were merged about 1875 and the resulting institution was run as a denominationally mixed school. It was split into two classes and thus employed two schoolteachers, one of each denomination. The first known schoolteacher at the Protestant school was Johannes Lehmann, born in 1809 in Relsberg. He was assistant teacher in 1829 before becoming full teacher in 1833. In 1834 he asked for his salary to be raised, but this was not approved, because the pastor was at odds with Lehmann over the schoolteacher's broad mindset. In 1841, Lehmann got himself into a dispute with the municipality over sheep grazing. The ongoing differences of opinion between Lehmann on the one hand and the pastor and the municipality on the other eventually led to neglect of the school and the teaching. In 1842, Lehmann's wife opened a general store, which led to complaints to the school inspectorate. In 1856, the municipality bought a cropfield that was to be used by both schoolteachers for their own needs. In 1871, the school administrator Heyl was sent to be Lehmann's assistant, but Heyl soon found himself doing all the teaching when Lehmann retired. In 1874, the teaching post was once again vacant, and schoolteachers Karl Keller, who had been working in Sitters, and Jakob Brosius, from Feilbingert, taught temporarily. The first known Catholic schoolteacher was Friedrich Groß from Würzweiler, born in 1821, who received a yearly salary of 175 Rhenish guilders, which was raised by 25 guilders from the district school fund. A report about him in 1853 said that he was hardworking, regularly attended church, received the Sacraments and also held Sunday school. In 1887, Groß, at the age of 66, took “early” retirement owing to illness. The other schoolteachers all taught at the merged, denominationally mixed school, where Protestant schoolchildren were the majority (1874: 15 Catholic, 17 Protestant). For the most part, the Catholic schoolteacher taught the lower class while the Protestant schoolteacher taught the upper class. Schoolteachers in the time that followed were Xaver Knörr, Christian Zimmer, Eduard Biermeier, Karl Baum, Andreas Streets, Pius Heiß, Adolf Braun, Karl Karsch, Ludwig Liebel, Josef Laux, Jakob Schild and Otto Anthes. Knörr came in 1884 from Wasserzell. He was sick with emphysema and bronchial catarrh and forthwith sought retirement. The request was temporarily granted in 1884, becoming permanent by 1896. Biermeier had very good marks at teacher's college. In 1889, he wed a surgeon’s daughter, Maria Barnstein from Asbach in Lower Bavaria. Baum came from Münchweiler an der Alsenz. Heiß was from Middle Franconia and had taught in Contwig before being transferred to Nußbach. In 1919, he went to the school in Ginsweiler. Braun came from Rammelsbach in 1904, marrying Albertine Reinhardt from Hornbach in 1906. Beginning in 1889, a change began with Baum. Many Catholic schoolchildren saw fit to attend the Catholic school in nearby Reipoltskirchen, where Josef Laux was transferred in 1907. The first woman to teach school in Nußbach was Hedwig Betzler, who came to the village after the First World War. Nowadays, primary school pupils and Hauptschule students attend their respective schools in Wolfstein.

== Famous people ==
=== Sons and daughters of the town ===
Aloys Schirmer (b. 4 December 1911; d. 7 October 1981 in Landau) — After his Abitur at the episcopal boarding school in 1932, Schirmer studied theology in Innsbruck and Vienna. In 1937, he was ordained a priest. He was assistant at the Maria Rosenberg seminary and prefect at the girls’ orphanage. After wartime service and imprisonment, he became assistant priest in Ruppertsberg, and as of 1950 docent at the Landau Paedagogical Academy. He was pastor in Hauenstein in 1957, and in Göcklingen in 1964. About this latter municipality he wrote an extensive local history, and he also became an honorary citizen there.
