= Odenbach (Glan) =

River in Germany

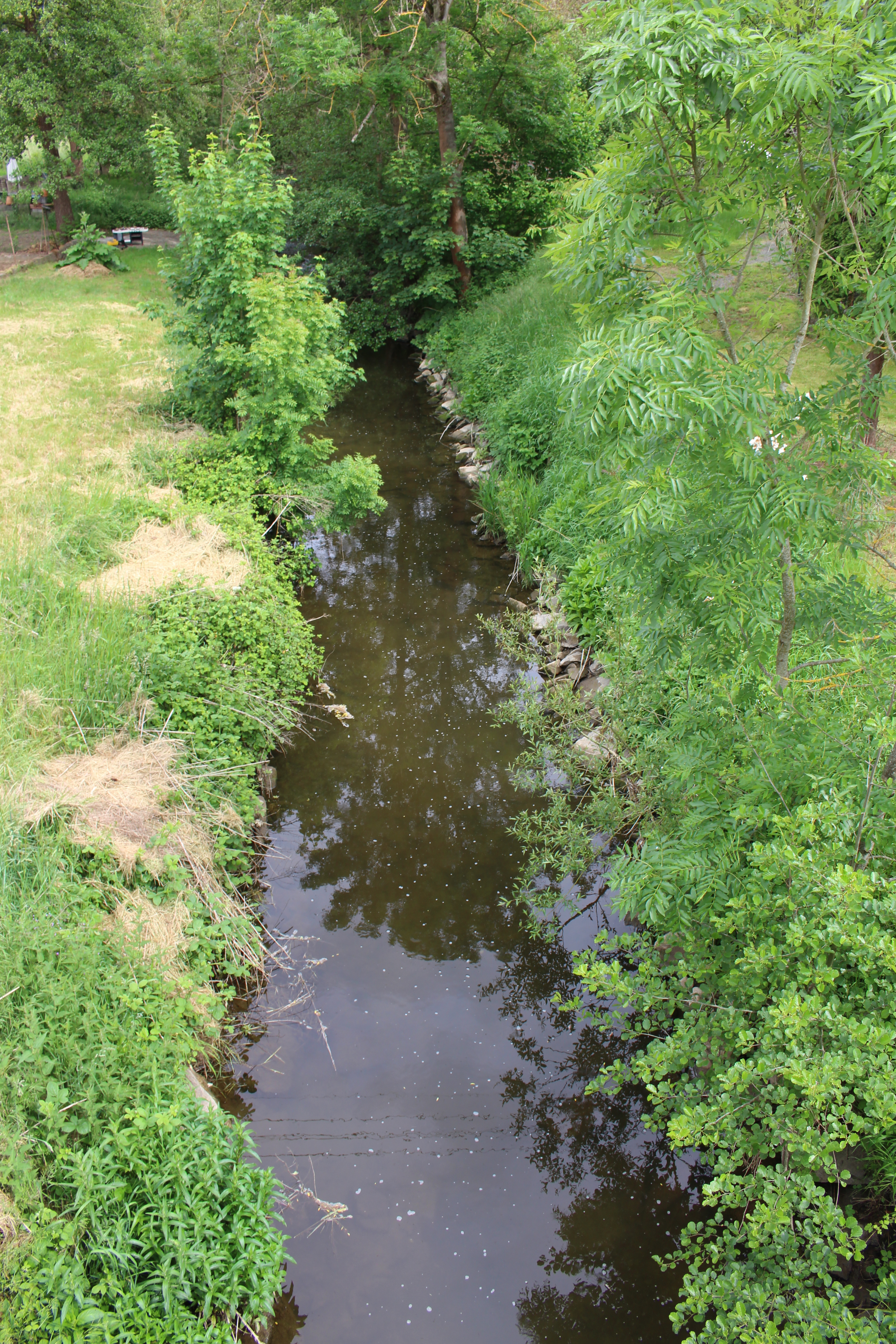
- The Odenbach in the municipality of Odenbach

Location
- Location: North French Scarplands: Saar Nahe Upland and Tableland; North Palatine Uplands; Germany: Rhineland-Palatinate; Kaiserslautern; Kusel
- Reference no.: DE: 25468

Physical characteristics
- Source
  - location: South of Schneckenhausen near the hamlet of Sonnenhof
  - coordinates: 49°32′1.20″N 7°44′39.60″E
  - elevation: ca. 332 m above sea level (NHN)
- Mouth
  - location: In Odenbach from the right into the Glan
  - coordinates: 49°40′58.29″N 7°38′58.73″E
  - elevation: ca. 152 m above sea level (NHN)
- Length: 22.72 km (14.12 mi)
- Basin size: 85.956 km^{2} (33.188 sq mi)

Basin features
- Progression: Glan→ Nahe→ Rhine→ North Sea

The Odenbach is a 22.7-kilometre-long (14.1 mi) orographically right bank tributary of the Glan in the counties of Kaiserslautern and Kusel in the German state of Rhineland-Palatinate.

== Geography ==
=== Course ===
The Odenbach rises about 8 km (5.0 mi) north of Kaiserslautern in the North Palatine Uplands near the hamlet of Sonnenhof. It flows – mainly in a north-northwesterly direction – through the municipalities of Schneckenhausen, Schallodenbach and Niederkirchen in the county of Kaiserslautern and through Hefersweiler, Reipoltskirchen, Ginsweiler and Adenbach in the county of Kusel, before emptying into the Glan in the eponymous village of Odenbach after a distance of just under 23 kilometres.

=== Catchment ===
The catchment of the Odenbach covers an area of 85.956 km^{2} (33.188 sq mi) and consist of 50% arable land, 25.6% pasture, 20.2% woodland and 4.2% settlements.

=== Tributaries ===
The most important tributary of the Odenbach is the Nußbach, which alone drains 21% of the catchment of the Odenbach. The other streams have a catchment of less than 10 km^{2} (3.9 sq mi).

The following table shows the tributaries of the Odenbach from source to mouth, as listed by the Water Management Authority of Rhineland-Palatinate. The table gives the name, whether it is a left or right tributary, its length, its catchment area,, the location of its confluence, the height of its confluence and its waterbody number.

Name	Left/right tributary	Length [km]	Catchment [km^{2}]	Distance from mouth [km]	Height at confluence [m above sea level]	GKZ
Steidelbach	left	0.7	0.415	West of Schneckenhausen	326	25468-1112
Horterbach	right	2.2	2.205	On the western edge of Schneckenhausen	319	25468-112
(stream from) Gorrhof	left	0.5	0.222	Between Schneckenhausen and Schallodenbach	314	25468-1192
Kirschgraben (Note: Taken from the flur name Kirschgraben) (Note: At GeoExplorer is the name Wickelhöfer Tal.)	right	0.8	0.535	Between Schneckenhausen and Schallodenbach	313	25468-1194
Sellbach	right	1.0	0.781	East of Schallodenbach	308	25468-12
(stream from the) source	left	0.4	0.198	East of Schallodenbach	304	25468-132
Baierbach	right	0.9	0.825	West of Schallodenbach	301	25468-134
Faulborn	left	1.0	0.618	Northwest of Schallodenbach	292	25468-136
Neuhöfer Bach	left	0.9	0.742	Between Schallodenbach and Niederkirchen-Wörsbach	290	25468-14
Wörsbach	left	1,4	1,584	südlich von Wörsbach-Rauschermühle	281	25468-16
Lenzelbach (Note: Name taken from the Karte zur Anordnung nach § 36 FlurbG Maßstab 1: 5000 der Flurbereinigungsbehörde) (Note: Landschaftsplanung der Verbandsgemeinde Otterberg, April 1997)	left	0.5		Near Wörsbach-Rauschermühle	281	25468-1912
Finstergraben	right	1.7	0,349	NNE of Wörsbach-Rauschermühle	265	25468-1914
(stream from the) Flachsgarten	left	0.1	0.410	S of Niederkirchen	261	25468-1916
Käsbach (Note: At GeoExplorer is the name Amoshof.)	right	0.3	0.687	S of Niederkirchen	260	25468-1918
Weilerbach (Bellenmühlbach) (Note: LANIS Maßstab 1:8000)	left	2.4	2.984	In Niederkirchen	259	25468-192
Steinbach	right	4.2	9.879	In Niederkirchen	259	25468-2
Farsbach (Note: Name taken from the flur name In der Farsbach.) (Note: At GeoExplorer is the name Ingelwege.) (Note: At GeoExplorer, the length of the whole section is not given, so this has been measured from LANIS.) (Note: The length on GeoExplorer is 0.456 km)	left	1.2	0.777	NW of Niederkirchen	241	25468-31129
Kohlengraben	right	0.6	0.431	NE of Niederkirchen-Bügenmühlerhof	240	25468-312
Morgraben	left	0.3	0.232	NW of Niederkirchen-Bügenmühlerhof	240	25468-3192
Moorbach	left	3.1	3.385	in Niederkirchen-Morbach	236	25468-32
Kallbach (Note: Name taken from the Flurnamen im Quellbereich.) (Note: Missing at GeoExplorer, so the length and catchment have been measured on LANIS.)	right	1.8	1.42	SSW of Seelen	233	25468-3??
Mühlgraben	left	0.5	0.214	S of Hefersweiler	225	25468-392
Wambach	left	1.9	1.973	In Hefersweiler	224	25468-4
Borngraben	right	1.1	0.690	W of Hefersweiler-Berzweiler	221	25468-512
Zangengraben	left	1.7	1.127	NE of Hefersweiler-Ahlbornerhof	216	25468-52
Emmersbach	right	1.0	0.665	SSE of Reipoltskirchen-Ingweilerhof	211	25468-592
Hirzbach	left	0.4	0.106	Opposite Ingweilerhof	210	25468-594
Nußbach	right	7.4	18.468	SE of Reipoltskirchen	199	25468-6
Ausbach	left	3.0	2.636	In Reipoltskirchen	199	25468-72
Hahnenbach (Note: Missing at GeoExplorer, so the length has been measured on LANIS.)	left	1.3		NW of Reipoltskirchen	187	
Schlappenrecher Graben	right			NW of Reipoltskirchen		
Becherbach	right	2.5	4.305	W of Ginsweiler	177	25468-8
Olkengraben	left	0.6	0.96	E of Adenbach-Brucherhof	170	25468-91?
Adenbach	right	2.6	2.451	W edge of Adenbach	166	25468-92
Igelsgraben	right	0.3	0.425	In Odenbach	155	25468-9992

== Transport routes ==
The L 201 runs through the Odenbach valley.

== Leisure pursuits ==
The Odenbach Valley Cycleway runs through the Odenbach valley for 31.5 kilometres (19.6 mi). It runs from Otterberg via Niederkirchen to Odenbach

== Sights ==
The best known sights in the valley are the two water castles:

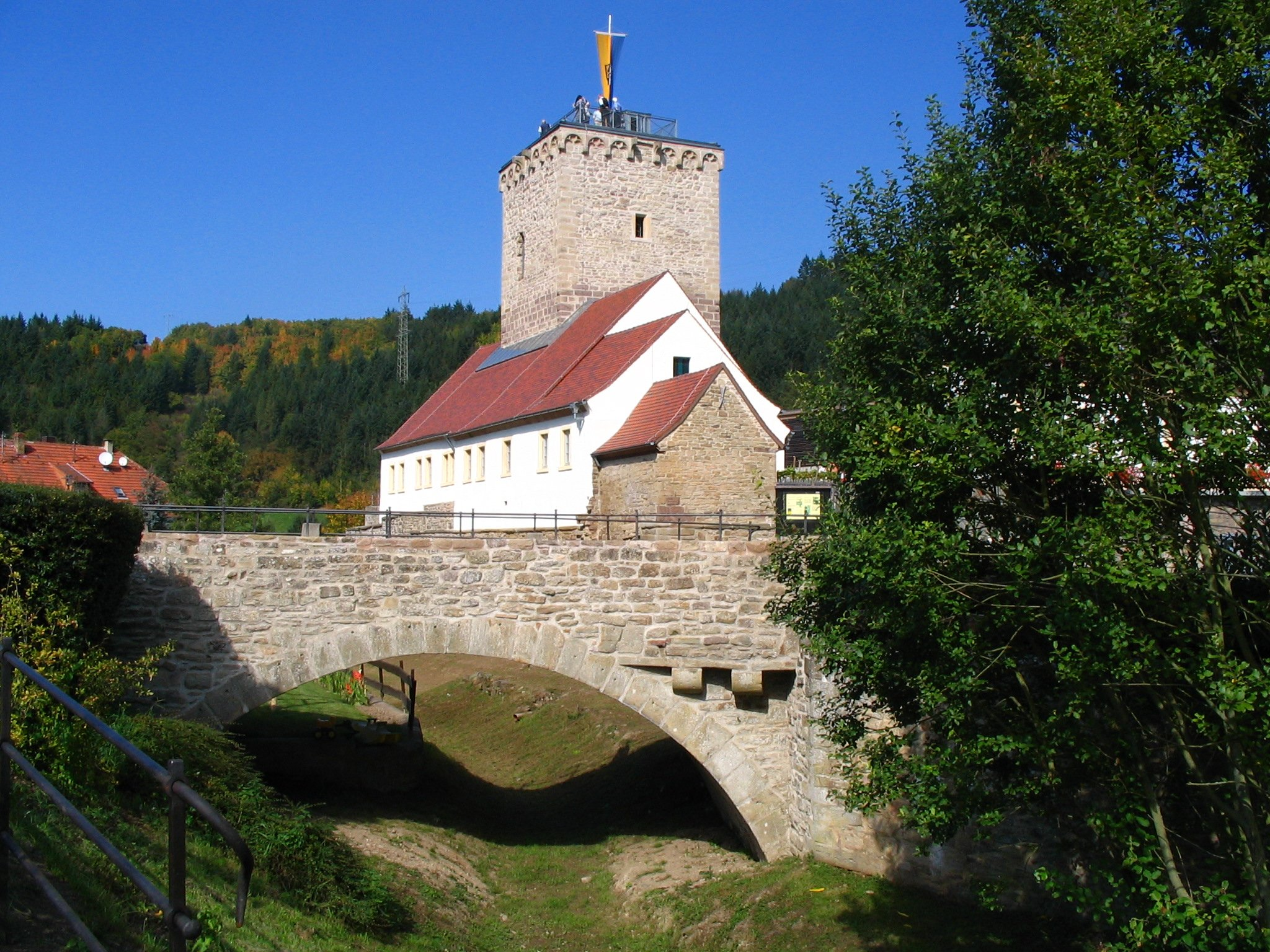

- Reipoltskirchen Castle, built in the 12th century, lies on a rocky hill spur above the Odenbach. It was the seat of the lords of Hohenfels-Reipoltskirchen and is first recorded in 1276. The site has largely survived and been restored. It is used by the municipality of Reipoltskirchen inter alia as the Standesamt. Its bergfried is used by tourists as an observation tower.
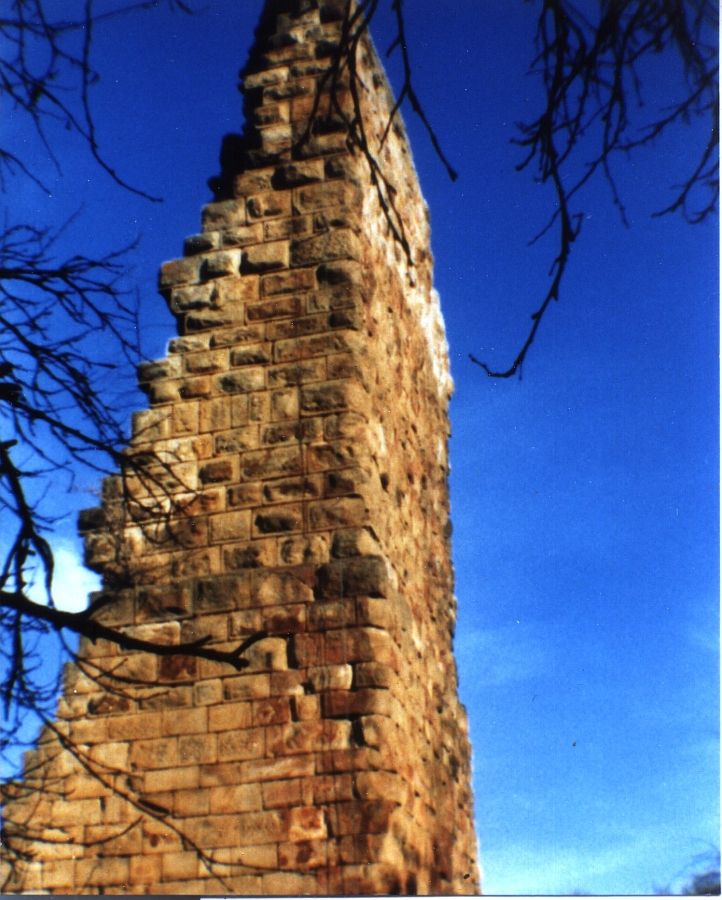

- Odenbach Castle, at the confluence of the river with the Glan, was built in the 2nd half of the 12th century by the counts of Veldenz and blown up in 1683 by troops of the French king, Louis XIV. The ruins include the renovated remains of the bergfried, which is built of impressive rusticated ashlar blocks and, as the Weiherturm, has become the symbol of the village of Odenbach.

== See also ==
- List of rivers of Rhineland-Palatinate
