= Marienthal =

Marienthal may refer to:

== Places ==
=== Germany ===
- Marienthal, Ducherow, an Ortsteil of Ducherow, Mecklenburg-Vorpommern
- Marienthal (Geisenheim), a quarter of Geisenheim, Hesse
- Marienthal, Hamburg, a quarter in the Wandsbek borough of Hamburg
- Marienthal (Rockenhausen), an Ortsteil of Rockenhausen, Rhineland-Palatinate
- Marienthal, Zehdenick, an Ortsteil of Zehdenick, Brandenburg
- Marienthal, Zwickau, an Ortsteil of Zwickau, Saxony

=== Elsewhere ===
- Basilique Notre-Dame de Marienthal, a locality of Haguenau, France
- Marienthal, Saskatchewan, a hamlet in Rural Municipality of Cambria No. 6, Canada
- Marienthal, Luxembourg
- Mariental, Namibia
- Marienthal, Eastern Cape, Amahlathi Local Municipality, South Africa
- Marienthal, Kansas, United States
- Marienthal Park, part of the Pavlovsk Palace, Saint Petersburg, Russia

== People with the surname ==
- Eli Marienthal (born 1986), American actor
- Eric Marienthal (born 1957), American saxophonist
- Mike Marienthal (1923–2013), American basketballer

== See also ==
- Mariental (disambiguation)
- St. Marienthal Abbey
