= Wörsbach (Odenbach) =

River in Germany

Location
- Country: Germany
- State: Rhineland-Palatinate

Physical characteristics
- Source
  - location: in Wörsbach, a district of Niederkirchen
  - coordinates: 49.5566°N 7.6712°E
- Mouth
  - location: between Niederkirchen and Schallodenbach into the Odenbach
  - coordinates: 49.5607°N 7.6890°E

Wörsbach is a river of Rhineland-Palatinate, Germany. It is a left tributary of the Odenbach.

== See also ==
- List of rivers of Rhineland-Palatinate
