= Relsberg =

- Municipality
- Coat of arms

- Location of Relsberg within Kusel district
- Interactive map of Relsberg
- Location within Germany Location within Rhineland-Palatinate
- Coordinates: 49°35′39″N 7°40′09″E
- Country: Germany
- State: Rhineland-Palatinate
- District: Kusel
- Municipal assoc.: Lauterecken-Wolfstein

Government
  - Mayor (2019–24): Jürgen Werner

Area
  - Total: 3.81 km^{2} (1.47 sq mi)
- Elevation: 398 m (1,306 ft)

Population (2025-12-31)
  - Total: 176
  - Density: 46.2/km^{2} (120/sq mi)
- Time zone: UTC+01:00 (CET)
  - Summer (DST): UTC+02:00 (CEST)
- Postal codes: 67753
- Dialling codes: 06363
- Vehicle registration: KUS

Relsberg is an Ortsgemeinde – a municipality belonging to a Verbandsgemeinde, a kind of collective municipality – in the Kusel district in Rhineland-Palatinate, Germany. It belongs to the Verbandsgemeinde Lauterecken-Wolfstein.

== Geography ==
=== Location ===
Relsberg lies in the North Palatine Uplands on a ridge between the Lauter and Odenbach valleys at an elevation of some 360 m above sea level in the headwaters of some small streams that run to the Odenbach. The elevations in the immediate vicinity reach beyond 400 m above sea level. Not quite reaching this height on the Ordnance Survey map are the Bauschüttberg (399 m) and the Kahlenberg (396 m). The municipal area measures 381 ha, of which roughly 10 ha is settled and 46 ha is wooded.

=== Neighbouring municipalities ===
Relsberg borders in the north on the municipality of Reipoltskirchen, in the northeast on the municipality of Hefersweiler, in the south on the municipality of Niederkirchen, in the southwest on the town of Wolfstein and in the west on the municipality of Einöllen.

=== Municipality's layout ===
The greater part of the village lies on the road that leads from Wolfstein to Hefersweiler, although there is a notable concentration of population on the way into the village from the southwest as one enters the built-up area. At the other end of the village in the northeast, another road branches off Hauptstraße ("Main Street") going to the graveyard. The built-up area is made up mainly of old farmhouses and simple private houses. Even in this quiet village, though, institutions have located that one would normally expect to find only in towns. The village community centre stands at Hauptstraße 10. The village is today held to be a "rural residential community".

== History ==
=== Antiquity ===
From the Stone, Bronze and Iron Ages comes no direct information about archaeological finds anywhere within Relsberg's limits. Nevertheless, the area around what is now Relsberg was home to people in prehistoric times. Unearthed within neighbouring Einöllen's limits, but near the limit with Relsberg, were 15 stone hatchets in the early 20th century. Furthermore, several barrows, now nowhere to be seen, are believed to have once lain in this area.

=== Middle Ages ===
An exact time for Relsberg's founding cannot be pinpointed, but it is likely that it did not arise until the High Middle Ages, perhaps in the 12th century, around a castle that had been built sometime earlier. However, nothing at all is known about this castle. There are no written records that mention it, and even archaeology has yielded no knowledge of this mysterious building. In 1258, a knight, Godfried von Rulsberg, was named in a record. He was a Burgmann at Castle Lichtenberg, and his name cropped up in a document from the Count of Veldenz as a witness, or at least so wrote Father Michael Frey, a 19th-century Palatinate historian, albeit without citing a source, so that it cannot be verified. Otherwise, the village's history was always tightly bound with neighbouring Reipoltskirchen's (and consequently, readers should see the History section in that article for more information), that community once having been the seat of a local lordship, to which Relsberg belonged. According to that lordly history, Relsberg belonged in the 14th century, along with, among other neighbouring villages, Morbach, Niederkirchen and Hefersweiler, to the Counts of Hohenfels, and in the 15th century to the Lordship of Hohenfels-Reipoltskirchen. According to old documents, the Otterberg Monastery held extensive rights in Relsberg. A document recording levies owed the Monastery (1432–1462) stated, in archaic German, "Item zu Reilsperge hän wir ein Dritteil am Zehenden" ("Item: at Relsberg we have one third of the tithes"). In an account issued about 1555, a man named Peter von Relspergck crops up, who for a stated amount of wax had to pay two albus. At least one source cites this as Relsberg's first documentary mention.

=== Modern times ===
An important Lord of Reipoltskirchen in the 16th century was Johannes, who as a young knight for a time led Franz von Sickingen's army. His daughter-in-law Amalia wed Count Philipp I of Leiningen-Westerburg as her second husband, who introduced the Reformation into all his holdings, and also into the Lordship of Reipoltskirchen. Amalia bequeathed the Lordship of Reipoltskirchen in 1603 to her brothers Sebastian (d. 1619) and Emich (d. 1628). In the time that followed, there were further subdivisions of the lordship, which often was subject to several lords at once but always remained a territorial unit. Among lords who can be named were the Lords of Löwenhaupt, the Lords of Manderscheid-Keil, the Baron of Hillesheim (d. 1748), the Count of Ellradt (d. 1767), and finally Caroline von Isenburg, a natural daughter of Karl Theodor, the last Elector Palatine and Duke of Bavaria.

==== Recent times ====
In 1793, French Revolutionary troops took over the Lordship of Reipoltskirchen and thereby the village of Relsberg, too. The populace was made to pay contributions. In 1799, France dissolved all the old lordships and thereby the Lordship of Reipoltskirchen, too. Within the French First Republic, Relsberg now belonged to the Mairie ("Mayoralty") of Hefersweiler, the Canton of Wolfstein, the Arrondissement of Kaiserslautern and the Department of Mont-Tonnerre (or Donnersberg in German). After the reconquest of the German lands on the Rhine's left bank in 1814 by Prussian, Austrian and Russian troops, the Congress of Vienna drew new boundaries yet again. After a transitional time, Relsberg was grouped into the bayerischer Rheinkreis, later known as Rheinpfalz ("Rhenish Palatinate"), an exclave of the Kingdom of Bavaria in 1816. Relsberg then found itself in the canton of the Landcommissariat of Kusel and the Bürgermeisterei ("Mayoralty") of Hefersweiler. In the late 1920s and early 1930s, the Nazi Party (NSDAP) became very popular in Relsberg. In the 1928 Reichstag elections, 61% of the local votes went to Adolf Hitler's party, but by the 1930 Reichstag elections, this had grown to 90%. By the time of the 1933 Reichstag elections, after Hitler had already seized power, local support for the Nazis had swollen to a full 100%. This level of support was matched in very few other places in the area. Hitler's success in these elections paved the way for his Enabling Act of 1933 (Ermächtigungsgesetz), thus starting the Third Reich in earnest. The village stayed with Bavaria until the end of the Second World War, when it became part of the Federal Republic of Germany within the then newly founded state of Rhineland-Palatinate. In the course of administrative restructuring in this state in 1968, Relsberg became an Ortsgemeinde within the Verbandsgemeinde of Wolfstein and the Kusel district in 1972.

=== Population development ===
Until the 20th century, the greater part of Relsberg's people earned their living at agriculture. Nevertheless, Relsberg also yielded its share of Musikanten, travelling musicians who travelled the world for their livelihoods (see the Hinzweiler article for more about them, particularly the Musikanten and Otto Schwarz sections). The greater part of Relsberg's workforce must nowadays commute to jobs elsewhere, in, among other places, Kaiserslautern, Wolfstein and Lauterecken. Formerly, there were other job opportunities besides farming, albeit slight ones, within the village, namely in the craft occupations and at the stone quarries and mines in neighbouring areas. While a steady rise in population was to be noted throughout the 19th century, in the 20th, there was an at first gradual and then eventually a worsening loss in numbers. While there were some 300 inhabitants about 1900, the population is today nearer 200, about the same level as was seen at the onset of the 19th century.

The following table shows population development over the centuries for Relsberg, with some figures broken down by religious denomination:

Year	1825	1835	1871	1905	1939	1961	1998	2005
Total	145	202	253	277	290	241	240	243
Catholic	13	14				16
Evangelical	130	188				223

=== Municipality's name ===
Relsberg's name is a combination of the placename ending —berg or —burg and the prefix Regil or Ragilin, which is to be interpreted as a personal name. The name ending was originally —burg ("castle"), referring to a now vanished castle that must once have stood where the village now lies. It is thought that it still stood at the time of founding. However, nothing is known about this castle. Thus the name originally meant "Regil's (or Ragilin's) Castle". The name had its first documentary mention in an original document now kept at the Landesarchiv Speyer (State Archive) issued sometime between 1432 and 1462. Other names that the village has borne over time are Relsburg (before 1491), Relspergck (1555), Reylsberg (1560), Regelspurg or Regelsburg (1565) and Rölsberg (1824). Over time, the ending shifted to —berg, an important distinction, for although these endings are often pronounced the same way by English speakers, their pronunciations are quite distinct in German, as are their meanings. Berg is German for "mountain".

== Religion ==
Relsberg originally belonged to the Glan chapter within the Archbishopric of Mainz, and in terms of ecclesiastical organization was tied to Reipoltskirchen. That still held true after Philipp I of Westerburg-Leiningen introduced the Reformation in the 16th century, at the latest. In those days, all the villagers were, under the principle of cuius regio, eius religio, followers of Martin Luther's teachings. After the Thirty Years' War, Catholic Christians and those of other denominations were once again allowed to settle in the village. Nevertheless, the overwhelming majority of the villagers kept to Lutheranism, and only a few Catholics and Calvinists. The parish seat for the Lutherans was Nußbach. The Catholics belonged to the Reipoltskirchen church community. The Calvinists belonged to the community of Dörrmoschel. The problem of division within the Protestant community into Lutherans and Calvinists was laid to rest in 1818 when the two denominations merged in the Protestant Union.

=== Der Alte Friedhof ===
Relsberg has never had a church, and thus never a churchyard where the dead could be buried. Instead, they had to be taken a long way to the mother church, which is why the villagers in earlier days often referred to their way to church as the Totenweg ("dead man's way"). Until 1680, Relsberg took its dead by way of the old church path to Reipoltskirchen. From 1680 to 1688, late Protestants were buried in either Niederkirchen or Rathskirchen. Only beginning in 1688 could all Relsberg Lutherans be buried in Niederkirchen. On 18 September 1837, Niederkirchen council decided to put an end to burials at that village's churchyard, thus forcing each village to establish its own graveyard. In 1838 Relsberg did so, the one now known as Der Alte Friedhof – The Old Graveyard. The first villager to be buried in his own village was Heinrich Gödel. The last burial took place here in 1945. In 2005, the Relsberg Local History and Cultural Club leased the ground and set itself to work making The Old Graveyard publicly visitable.

About the graveyard, Karl-Werner Laub from Relsberg wrote in the 2008 village yearbook, Relsberg – kleine pfälzische Toscana ("Relsberg – Little Palatine Tuscany"):

He who once enters The Old Graveyard in the month of May ends up in a sweet-smelling lilac grove, over which a blossoming chestnut tree spreads its ancient boughs. Wild ivy grows over the overturned gravestones. Gilt names fade in the rubble overgrown with moss. He who gives himself over to thought under those May blossoms and young leaves on the graveyard bench encounters an original picture of Romanticism: mysteriously carefree, the colourful spring overgrows the transient idyll lying in the rubble. Long bygone death we receive like deep solace. It has lost its pain.

== Politics ==
=== Municipal council ===
The council is made up of 6 council members, who were elected by majority vote at the municipal election held on 7 June 2009, and the honorary mayor as chairman.

=== Mayor ===
Relsberg's mayor is Jürgen Werner.

=== Coat of arms ===
The German blazon reads: Über silbernem Dreiberg in Grün zwei gekreuzte silberne Ähren.

The municipality's arms might in English heraldic language be described thus: Vert two ears of wheat slipped per saltire above, issuant from base, a mount of three, all argent.

The charge in base, the "mount of three", known in German as a Dreiberg, is meant to represent the rugged country in which Relsberg lies, while the other charge, the two crossed ears of wheat, stand for what was well into the 20th century the village's economic mainstay, agriculture.

== Culture and sightseeing ==
=== Clubs ===
The following clubs are active in Relsberg:

- Gesangverein — singing club
- Landfrauenverein — countrywomen's club
- Schützenverein — shooting club
- SPD-Ortsverein — Social Democratic Party of Germany local chapter
- Heimat- und Kulturverein — local history and cultural club

== Economy and infrastructure ==
=== Economic structure ===
In earlier times, Relsberg's inhabitants lived mainly on agriculture. Besides farming, there were also craft trades and the opportunity to work at the local mines. Within Relsberg's limits also lay a coalmine. Today, most workers must commute to jobs elsewhere.

=== Education ===
The earliest information about schooling in Relsberg comes from the late 18th century in connection with silkworm raising by a 50-year-old schoolteacher whose name is unknown. From Relsberg itself came some teachers who in the time that followed taught elsewhere. In the 19th century, a teacher named Johann Lehmann from Relsberg taught for decades in Nußbach. Another teacher named Jacob Lehmann, born in 1822, also came from Relsberg and taught in his home village. He passed his examination at teacher's college in 1846, became school administrator in Relsberg in 1846 and in 1848 became the regular schoolteacher. Jacob Lehmann must have been highly strict with his pupils, and more often than not, school inspections yielded complaints about mishandling children, for which Lehmann once had to pay a fine of 7 Rhenish guilders and 28 Kreuzer. In 1870, Lehmann sought to have himself pensioned off because of a rheumatic complaint in his right leg. At first, all he got was an assistant, whom he was expected to pay out of his own pocket, since he was rather well off and could afford it. Nonetheless, this did not suit Lehmann and he fought the decision. The assistant's name was Karl Hauber, from Wolfstein. In 1881, Otto Lehmann came to teach for a short time from Niederkirchen. Jacob Lehmann died in 1882. Following him into the classroom was now Wilhelm Schuhmacher from Duchroth, who stayed in Relsberg until 1884. He was followed by Wolfgang Menhorn from Mönchsroth near Dinkelsbühl, who without announcing his intention left Relsberg in 1885 to seek more lucrative posts in Dessau and Neisse without success, whereupon he came back to Relsberg, rather ruefully. Menhorn was in debt, but managed to get back on his feet by marrying a craftsman's daughter from the Feuchtwangen area. Only after the wedding was he installed as the permanent teacher. He was nevertheless transferred in 1887 to Maßweiler. In 1888, the new schoolteacher was Philipp Honig from Roth, born in 1864 as that village's mayor's son. He completed teacher training in Schwabach and could present very good credentials. Honig introduced "work teaching", then a very progressive teaching method that was only conditionally accepted by the school authorities. He believed that with his teaching, pupils would be trained for a life that would allow them to forgo travelling the world as Musikanten, as the region's professional travelling musicians were known. From him came this lament:

Sadly it is too true a fact that right in this local area quite a significant percentage of pupils leaving weekday school prefer a roving musician's life to the stressful and earnest work of a handicraft.

In 1891, Honig became a teacher at a school in Nuremberg. Up to the outbreak of the First World War, a whole series of schoolteachers, none of whom stayed on very long, taught in the village. Today, primary school pupils and Hauptschule students attend their respective schools in Wolfstein. One family in Relsberg itself cares for children in need.

=== Transport ===
Relsberg lies on Kreisstraße 43, which branches off Landesstraße 384 (Wolfstein—Hefersweiler) and also links with Hefersweiler by way of Relsberg. To the west runs Bundesstraße 270. Serving Wolfstein is a railway station on the Lautertalbahn.
