= Nußbach =

Nußbach (Nussbach) may refer to:

- Nußbach, Austria, in Upper Austria, Austria
- Nußbach, Rhineland-Palatinate, in Rhineland-Palatinate, Germany
- Nußbach, the German name for Măieruş, Braşov, in Romania
