= Marienthal (Rockenhausen) =

- Borough of Rockenhausen
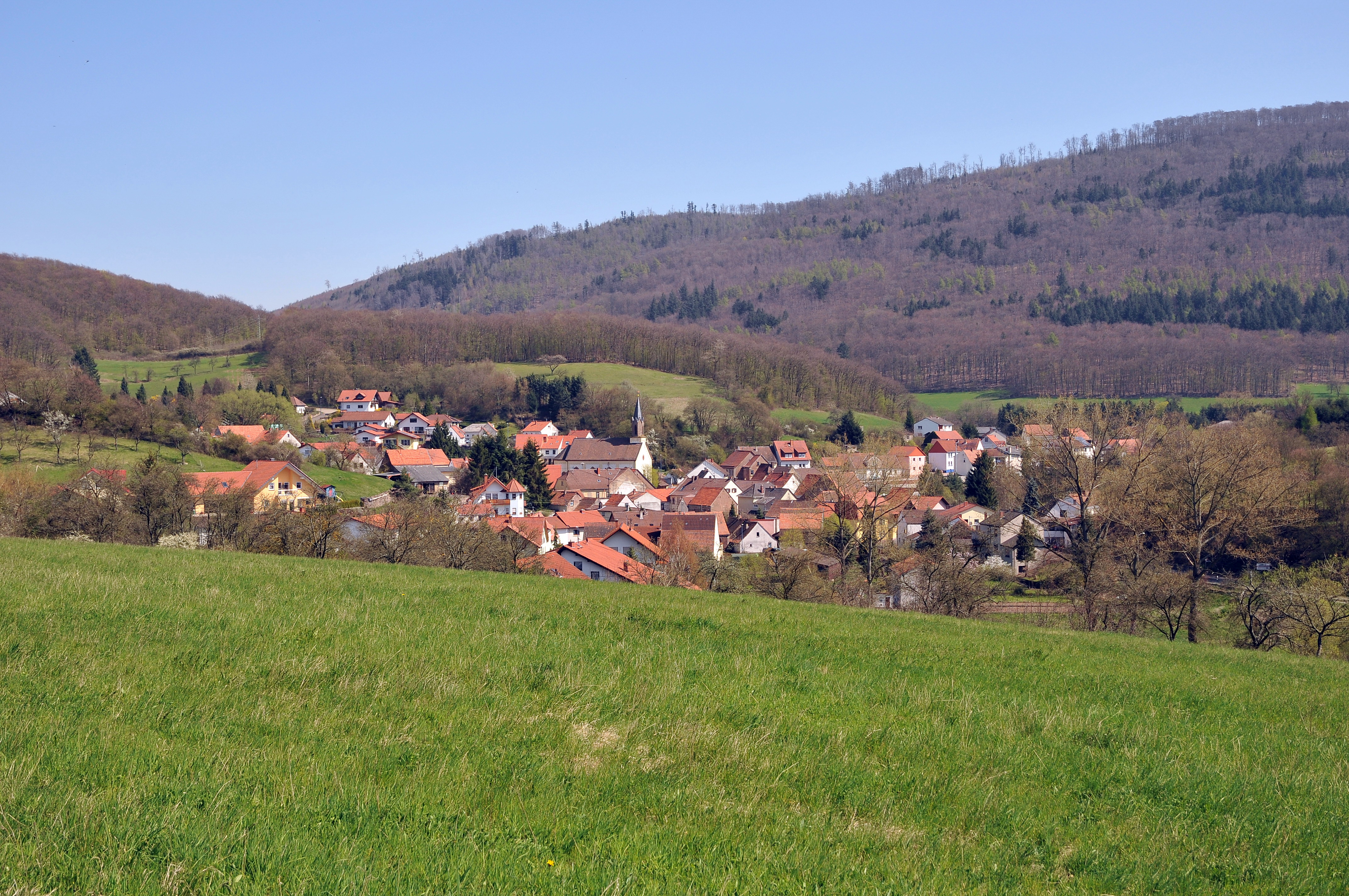

- Coat of arms
- Interactive map of Marienthal
- Location within Germany Location within Rhineland-Palatinate
- Coordinates: 49°38′N 7°53′E
- Country: Germany
- State: Rhineland-Palatinate
- District: Donnersbergkreis
- Town: Rockenhausen

Government
  - Mayor: Thomas Bauer

Area
  - Total: 6.93 km^{2} (2.68 sq mi)
- Elevation: 332 m (1,089 ft)

Population (2007)
  - Total: 325
  - Density: 46.9/km^{2} (121/sq mi)
- Time zone: UTC+01:00 (CET)
  - Summer (DST): UTC+02:00 (CEST)
- Postal codes: 67806
- Dialling codes: 06361

Marienthal (German pronunciation: [maˈʁiːənˌtaːl]) is a borough of Rockenhausen in the Donnersbergkreis district, in Rhineland-Palatinate, Germany. It was incorporated into the town on 10 June 1979.

== Geography ==
The village is located in the North Palatine Uplands on the western side of the Donnersberg mountain. The Mordkammertalbach stream flows through the valley in which Marienthal is situated.

Neighbouring villages are Dannenfels, Ruppertsecken, Würzweiler, Falkenstein and the town of Rockenhausen.

== History ==
The first settlers in the area were nuns who dedicated the valley to Saint Mary (Latin: "Vallis Sanctae Mariae"), hence the name "Marienthal" (Mary‘s Valley). Their monastery was founded in 1145. It was burned in 1525 and formally abolished in 1541. In the years after the village belonged to various dominions, including the Electoral Palatinate.

After the War of the First Coalition Marienthal was occupied and later annexed by France with the Treaty of Campo Formio in 1797. From 1798 to 1814 it belonged to the French Departement du Mont-Tonnerre. After the Congress of Vienna the region was first given to Austria (1815) and later to Bavaria (1816).

After World War II Marienthal became part of Rhineland-Palatinate (1946). Since 1969 it belongs to the Donnersbergkreis district. In 1979 it became a part of Rockenhausen.

== Religion ==
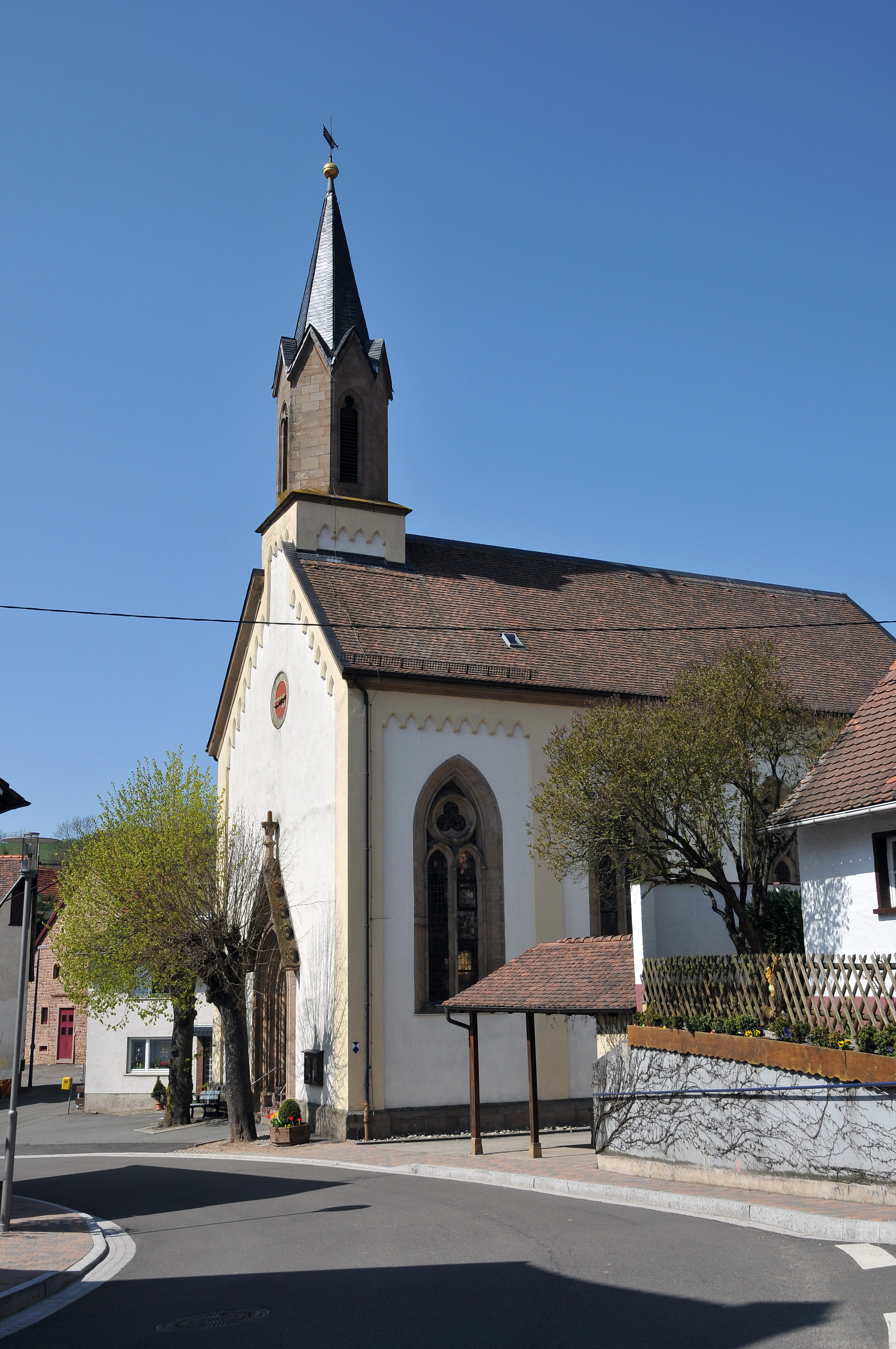
Protestant church

The village became protestant in 1557 and the Catholic Church of the monastery was given to the protestants. It was demolished in 1843 and rebuilt using parts of the old building.

Today Marienthal is the seat of a protestant parish, which also includes Würzweiler, Ruppertsecken and various farms and hamlets.
