= Mariental =

Mariental may refer to:

== Places ==
- Mariental, Germany, a settlement in the district of Helmstedt, Lower Saxony, Germany
- Mariental, Namibia, a settlement in the Hardap Region, Namibia
- Mariental, a valley near the Katzenbuckel located in Elztal, Germany
- Mariental, Switzerland, a valley in the canton of Lucerne, Switzerland
- Mariental, former name of Sovetskoye, Saratov Oblast, Russia
- Mariental, former name of Staromarivka, Ukraine

== Administrative units ==
- Mariental Rural, a constituency around the Namibian city of Mariental
- Mariental Urban, a constituency of the Namibian city of Mariental

== See also ==
- Marienthal (disambiguation)
