= Rathskirchen =

- Municipality
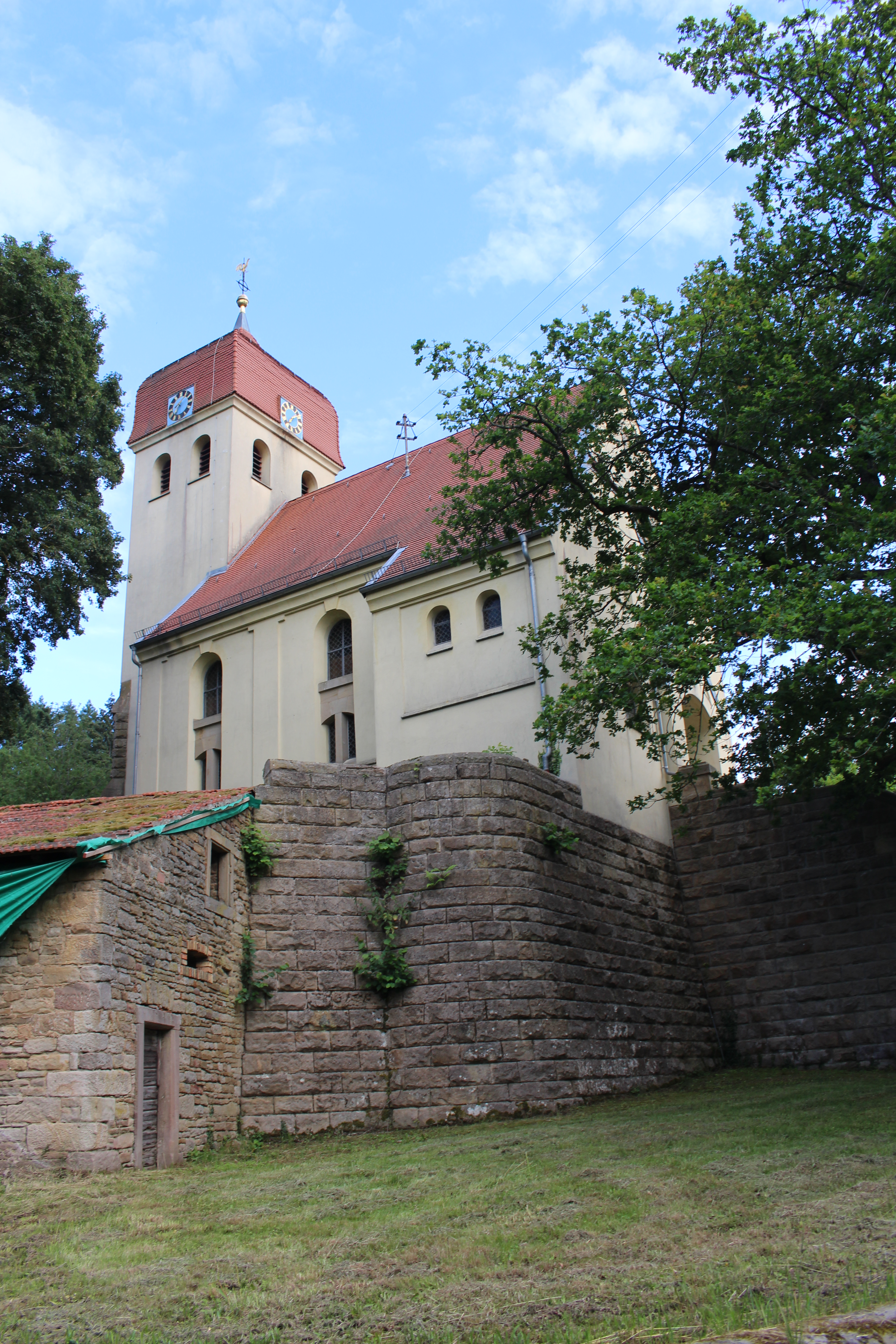
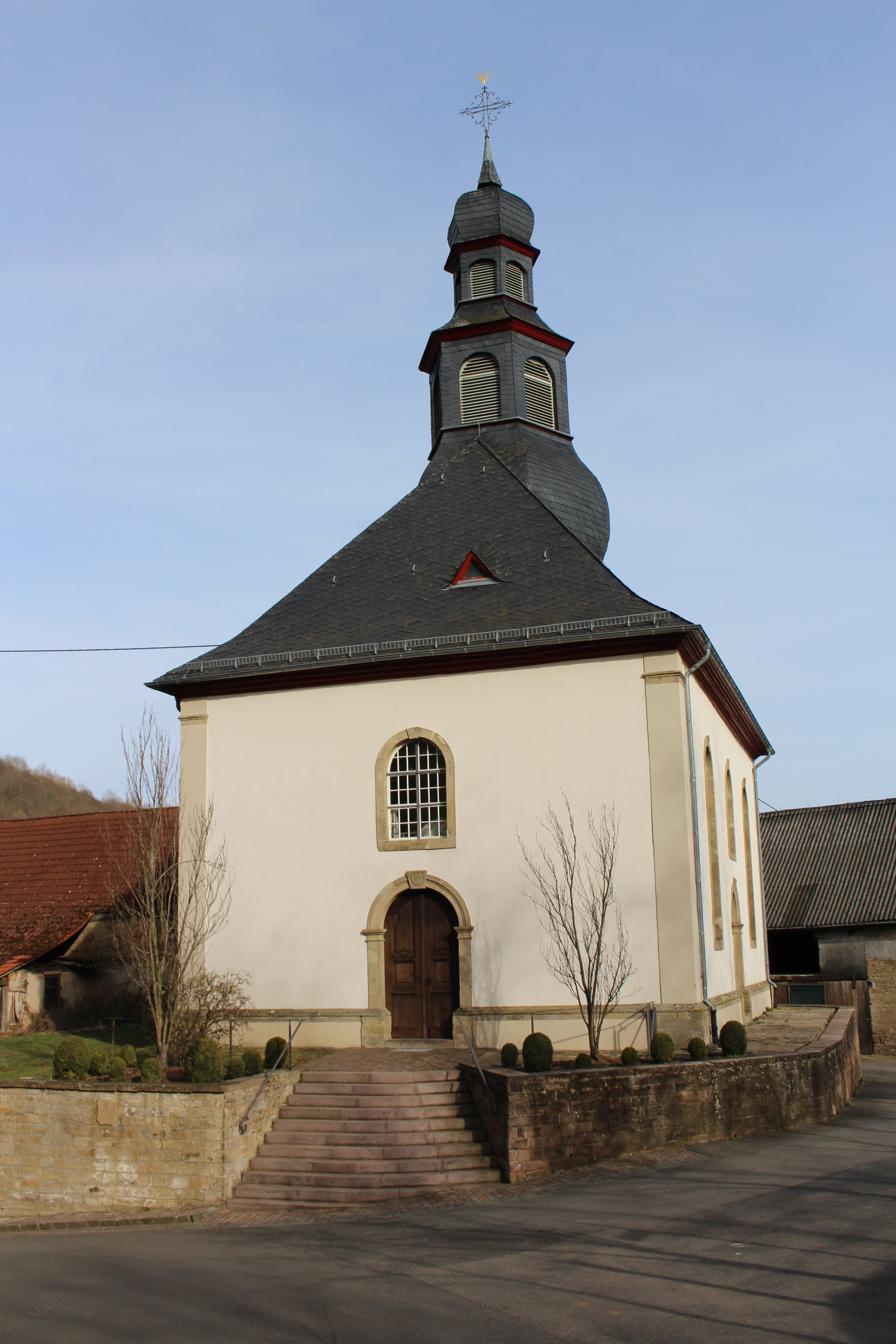
- Rathskirchen Rudolphskirchen

- Coat of arms

- Location of Rathskirchen within Donnersbergkreis district
- Interactive map of Rathskirchen
- Location within Germany Location within Rhineland-Palatinate
- Coordinates: 49°36′48.02″N 7°43′18.17″E
- Country: Germany
- State: Rhineland-Palatinate
- District: Donnersbergkreis
- Municipal assoc.: Nordpfälzer Land
- Subdivisions: 3

Government
  - Mayor (2024–29): Matthias Heckmann

Area
  - Total: 5.12 km^{2} (1.98 sq mi)
- Elevation: 290 m (950 ft)

Population (2025-12-31)
  - Total: 172
  - Density: 33.6/km^{2} (87.0/sq mi)
- Time zone: UTC+01:00 (CET)
  - Summer (DST): UTC+02:00 (CEST)
- Postal codes: 67744
- Dialling codes: 06364
- Vehicle registration: KIB

Rathskirchen is a municipality in the Donnersbergkreis district, in Rhineland-Palatinate, Germany.

== Geography ==
Rathskirchen is located in the North Palatine Uplands, west of the Donnersberg, in the valley of the Hahnenbach stream. The nearest significant cities are Bad Kreuznach and Kaiserslautern.

The municipality is made up of the two villages of Rathskirchen and Rudolphskirchen and the hamlet of Bösodenbacherhof.

Neighbouring municipalities are Nußbach, Teschenmoschel, Dörrmoschel, Imsweiler, Reichsthal, Seelen and Hefersweiler.

== History ==
After the War of the First Coalition Rathskirchen and Rudolphskirchen were occupied and later annexed by France with the Treaty of Campo Formio in 1797. From 1798 to 1814 they belonged to the French Departement du Mont-Tonnerre. After the Congress of Vienna the region was first given to Austria (1815) and later to Bavaria (1816).

After World War II the two villages became part of Rhineland-Palatinate (1946). In 1969 the two independent villages of Rathskirchen (pop. 178) and Rudolphskirchen (pop. 80) formed the new municipality of Rathskirchen. In 1972 the municipality switched from Kusel district to the Donnersbergkreis district.

== Politics ==
=== Mayor ===
Matthias Heckmann is the mayor of Rathskirchen since 2024.

His predecessor Oskar Stark held the office since 1994.

=== Heraldry ===
The coat of arms shows a church, an argent anchor on vert (Dominion of Reipoltskirchen) and an argent wheel on azure (County of Falkenstein).

== Infrastructure ==
The nearest highway exit is located along A63 in Winnweiler, 19 km (12 mi) southeast of Rathskirchen.

Bus line 912 of the VRN serves both villages and connects them to Rockenhausen, where a train station is located.
