= Schönborn, Donnersbergkreis =

Schönborn
- Municipality
- Coat of arms

- Location of Schönborn within Donnersbergkreis district
- Interactive map of Schönborn
- Location within Germany Location within Rhineland-Palatinate
- Coordinates: 49°38′31″N 7°46′26″E
- Country: Germany
- State: Rhineland-Palatinate
- District: Donnersbergkreis
- Municipal assoc.: Nordpfälzer Land

Government
  - Mayor (2019–24): Dirk Braun

Area
  - Total: 2.61 km^{2} (1.01 sq mi)
- Elevation: 417 m (1,368 ft)

Population (2025-12-31)
  - Total: 104
  - Density: 39.8/km^{2} (103/sq mi)
- Time zone: UTC+01:00 (CET)
  - Summer (DST): UTC+02:00 (CEST)
- Postal codes: 67808
- Dialling codes: 06361
- Vehicle registration: KIB

Schönborn (German pronunciation: [ˈʃøːnbɔʁn]) is a municipality in the Donnersbergkreis district, in Rhineland-Palatinate, Germany.

== Geography ==
The village is located in the North Palatine Uplands, west of the Donnersberg mountain. The nearest bigger cities are Bad Kreuznach and Kaiserslautern.

== History ==
Until the end of the 18th century Schönborn belonged to the imperial immediate Baronetcy of Reipoltskirchen that was ruled by the Princes of Isenburg-Büdingen and the Counts of Hillesheim.

After the War of the First Coalition Schönborn was occupied and later annexed by France with the Treaty of Campo Formio in 1797. From 1798 to 1814 it belonged to the French Departement du Mont-Tonnerre. After the Congress of Vienna the region was first given to Austria (1815) and later to Bavaria (1816).

After World War II Schönborn became part of Rhineland-Palatinate (1946). Since 1969 it belongs to the Donnersbergkreis district.

=== Population ===
year	population
1815	175
1835	246
1871	258
1905	252
1939	221
1950	227

year	population
1961	192
1970	159
1987	137
1997	144
2005	135
2025	104

== Infrastructure ==
The village is located about 5 km (3 mi) from B47 federal road. A highway exit can be reached in 15 km (9 mi) in Winnweiler along A63.

Bus line 913 of the VRN connect Schönborn to Alsenz and Rockenhausen, where the nearest train station is located.

In the former radar station at the edge of the village a buddhist temple of the Theravada tradition can be visited.
