= Würzweiler =

- Municipality
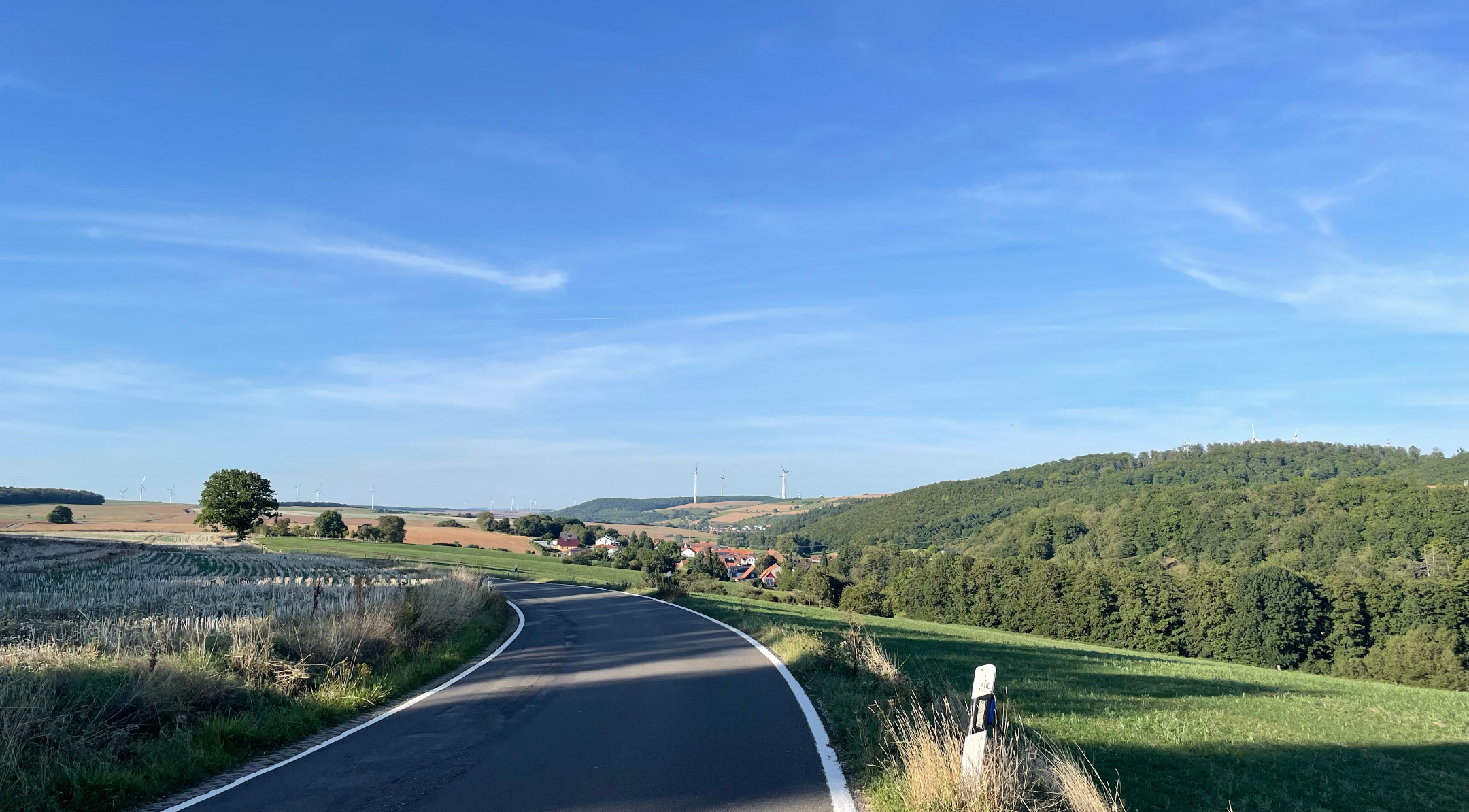
- Würzweiler seen from the south

- Coat of arms

- Location of Würzweiler within Donnersbergkreis district
- Interactive map of Würzweiler
- Location within Germany Location within Rhineland-Palatinate
- Coordinates: 49°39′15″N 7°51′46″E
- Country: Germany
- State: Rhineland-Palatinate
- District: Donnersbergkreis
- Municipal assoc.: Nordpfälzer Land

Government
  - Mayor (2019–24): Uwe Pfeiffer

Area
  - Total: 2.33 km^{2} (0.90 sq mi)
- Elevation: 282 m (925 ft)

Population (2025-12-31)
  - Total: 210
  - Density: 90/km^{2} (230/sq mi)
- Time zone: UTC+01:00 (CET)
  - Summer (DST): UTC+02:00 (CEST)
- Postal codes: 67808
- Dialling codes: 06361
- Vehicle registration: KIB

Würzweiler is a municipality in the Donnersbergkreis district, in Rhineland-Palatinate, Germany.
