= Finkenbach-Gersweiler =

- Municipality
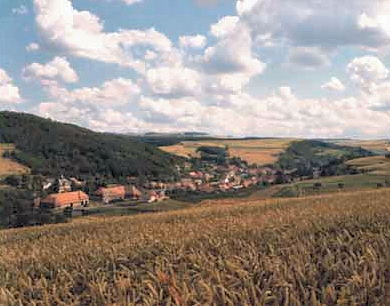

- Coat of arms

- Location of Finkenbach-Gersweiler within Donnersbergkreis district
- Interactive map of Finkenbach-Gersweiler
- Location within Germany Location within Rhineland-Palatinate
- Coordinates: 49°40′58″N 7°44′44″E
- Country: Germany
- State: Rhineland-Palatinate
- District: Donnersbergkreis
- Municipal assoc.: Nordpfälzer Land

Government
  - Mayor (2019–24): Eva Schlemmer

Area
  - Total: 7.73 km^{2} (2.98 sq mi)
- Elevation: 190–230 m (620–750 ft)

Population (2025-12-31)
  - Total: 284
  - Density: 36.7/km^{2} (95.2/sq mi)
- Time zone: UTC+01:00 (CET)
  - Summer (DST): UTC+02:00 (CEST)
- Postal codes: 67822
- Dialling codes: 06362
- Vehicle registration: KIB
- Website: www.finkenbachgersweiler.de

Finkenbach-Gersweiler is a municipality in the Donnersbergkreis district, in Rhineland-Palatinate, Germany.
