= Reichsthal =

- Municipality
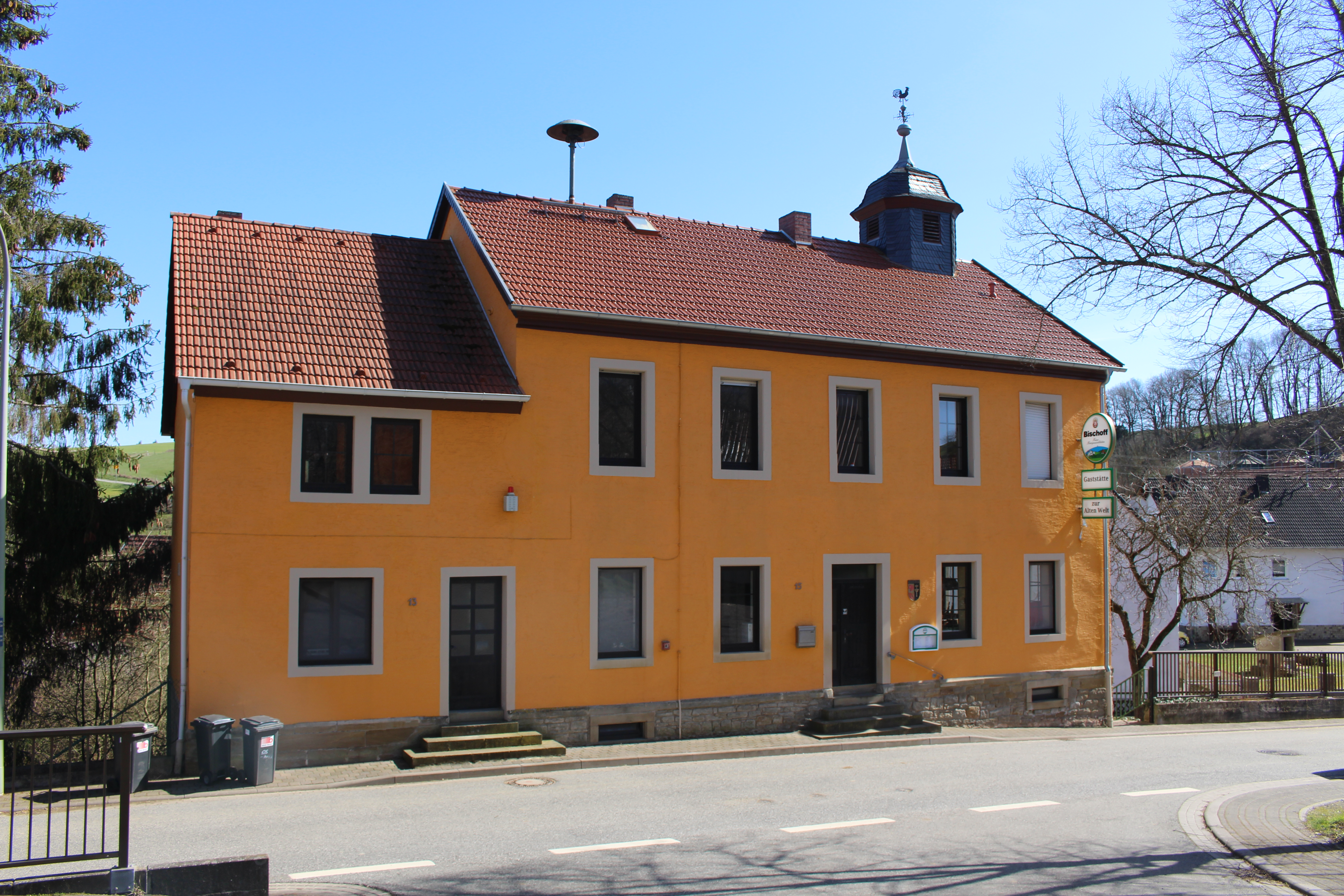
- former school and village hall

- Coat of arms

- Location of Reichsthal within Donnersbergkreis district
- Interactive map of Reichsthal
- Location within Germany Location within Rhineland-Palatinate
- Coordinates: 49°35′50″N 7°43′45″E
- Country: Germany
- State: Rhineland-Palatinate
- District: Donnersbergkreis
- Municipal assoc.: Nordpfälzer Land

Government
  - Mayor (2019–24): Dirk Grill

Area
  - Total: 2.17 km^{2} (0.84 sq mi)
- Elevation: 347 m (1,138 ft)

Population (2025-12-31)
  - Total: 97
  - Density: 45/km^{2} (120/sq mi)
- Time zone: UTC+01:00 (CET)
  - Summer (DST): UTC+02:00 (CEST)
- Postal codes: 67759
- Dialling codes: 06363
- Vehicle registration: KIB
- Website: www.reichsthal.de

Reichsthal (German pronunciation: [ˈʁaɪçstaːl]) is a municipality in the Donnersbergkreis district, in Rhineland-Palatinate, Germany.
