= Seelen =

- Municipality
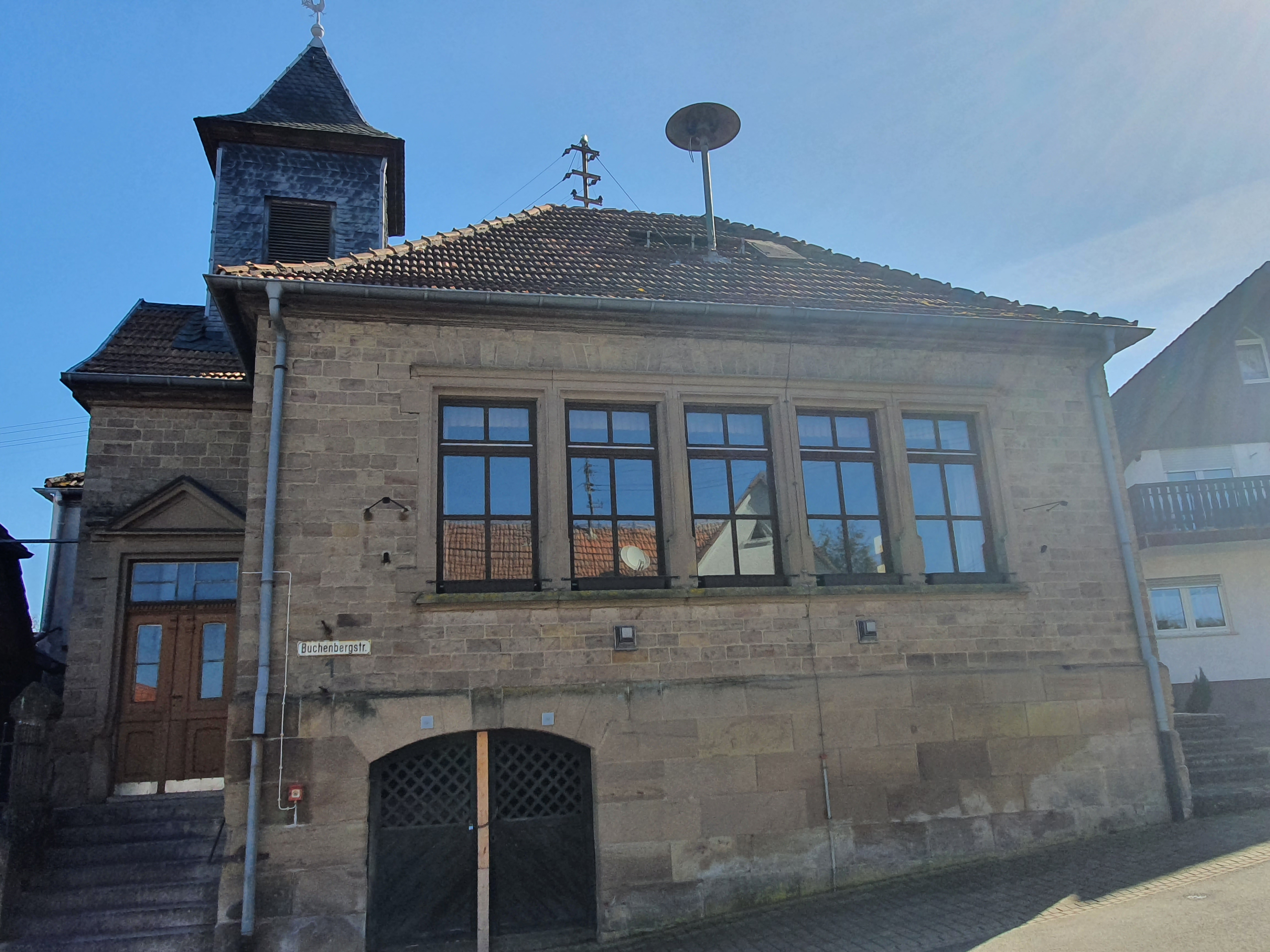
- former schoolhouse

- Coat of arms

- Location of Seelen within Donnersbergkreis district
- Interactive map of Seelen
- Location within Germany Location within Rhineland-Palatinate
- Coordinates: 49°36′04″N 7°42′58″E
- Country: Germany
- State: Rhineland-Palatinate
- District: Donnersbergkreis
- Municipal assoc.: Nordpfälzer Land

Government
  - Mayor (2019–24): Rainer Degen

Area
  - Total: 3.16 km^{2} (1.22 sq mi)
- Elevation: 383 m (1,257 ft)

Population (2025-12-31)
  - Total: 160
  - Density: 51/km^{2} (130/sq mi)
- Time zone: UTC+01:00 (CET)
  - Summer (DST): UTC+02:00 (CEST)
- Postal codes: 67744
- Dialling codes: 06363
- Vehicle registration: KIB

Seelen (German pronunciation: [ˈzeːlən]) is a municipality in the Donnersbergkreis district, in Rhineland-Palatinate, Germany.
