= Niederkirchen =

German municipality in Rhineland-Palatinate, western Germany

- Municipality
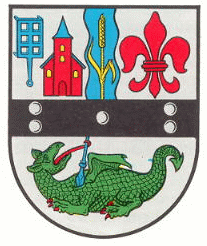
- Coat of arms

- Location of Niederkirchen within Kaiserslautern district
- Interactive map of Niederkirchen
- Location within Germany Location within Rhineland-Palatinate
- Coordinates: 49°34′52″N 7°41′55″E
- Country: Germany
- State: Rhineland-Palatinate
- District: Kaiserslautern
- Municipal assoc.: Otterbach-Otterberg
- Subdivisions: 3

Government
  - Mayor (2019–24): Wolfgang Pfleger (SPD)

Area
  - Total: 23.85 km^{2} (9.21 sq mi)
- Elevation: 256 m (840 ft)

Population (2025-12-31)
  - Total: 1,807
  - Density: 75.77/km^{2} (196.2/sq mi)
- Time zone: UTC+01:00 (CET)
  - Summer (DST): UTC+02:00 (CEST)
- Postal codes: 67700
- Dialling codes: 06363
- Vehicle registration: KL
- Website: www.otterberg.de

Niederkirchen is a municipality in the district of Kaiserslautern, in Rhineland-Palatinate, western Germany.
