= Adenbach =

- Municipality
- Coat of arms

- Location of Adenbach within Kusel district
- Interactive map of Adenbach
- Location within Germany Location within Rhineland-Palatinate
- Coordinates: 49°40′13″N 7°38′52″E
- Country: Germany
- State: Rhineland-Palatinate
- District: Kusel
- Municipal assoc.: Lauterecken-Wolfstein

Government
  - Mayor (2019–24): Jürgen Klein

Area
  - Total: 2.94 km^{2} (1.14 sq mi)
- Elevation: 180 m (590 ft)

Population (2025-12-31)
  - Total: 144
  - Density: 49.0/km^{2} (127/sq mi)
- Time zone: UTC+01:00 (CET)
  - Summer (DST): UTC+02:00 (CEST)
- Postal codes: 67742
- Dialling codes: 06753
- Vehicle registration: KUS

Adenbach is an Ortsgemeinde – a municipality belonging to a Verbandsgemeinde, a kind of collective municipality – in the Kusel district in Rhineland-Palatinate, Germany. It belongs to the Verbandsgemeinde Lauterecken-Wolfstein.

== Geography ==
=== Location ===
The municipality lies in the Odenbach valley in the North Palatine Uplands in the Western Palatinate.

The municipal area measures 294 ha, of which 20 ha is wooded and 10 ha is settled.

=== Neighbouring municipalities ===
Adenbach borders in the northwest and north on the municipality of Odenbach, in the east and southeast on the municipality of Becherbach, in the south on the municipality of Ginsweiler and in the southwest on the municipality of Cronenberg.

=== Constituent communities ===
Adenbach's Ortsteile are the main village site, also called Adenbach, and the outlying homesteads of Brühlerhof, Langwiesenhof, Bornweiderhof and Brucherhof.

=== Municipality’s layout ===
On the east side of the north–south thoroughfare, the houses stand cheek by jowl, forming here and on several sidestreets a small clump village. The new building area west of the village centre, though, is marked by looser construction along a street that runs beyond the brook, parallel to the thoroughfare. The Aussiedlerhöfe – the farming homesteads mentioned as outlying Ortsteile above – lie in the south of the municipal area. A new graveyard was established in 1988 on the brook's left bank.

== History ==
=== Antiquity ===
According to a writer named Wendel (who wrote a village chronicle), a Bronze Age axe was found within Adenbach's limits as early as the 19th century, although this has since been lost. The local area was therefore already settled in the Bronze Age, as it apparently also was later, in the Iron Age. During the construction of the Aussiedlerhof Brühlerhof, a rectangular pit was found with dark earth containing burnt matter, and with cremated remains. Grave goods included a fragment of a bronze fibula, an iron axe with a helve hole, a tureen-shaped thrown vessel, two dishes with curved rims and a heavily damaged dish with a thickened rim.

The Romans, too, left behind traces in what is now Adenbach. As early as 1839, a farmer found an 8 cm-tall Minerva statuette, which is now kept at the Historisches Museum der Pfalz (“Historical Museum of the Palatinate”) in Speyer. In 1957, remnants of a villa rustica were found by a farmer when his plough struck the foundation.

=== Middle Ages ===
Adenbach lay originally in the territory of the Counts of the Nahegau, from whom the new noble family of the Counts of Veldenz branched off about 1127. To a great extent, these counts acted as Schutzvögte – roughly “protectors” – over ecclesiastical holdings, namely those around Bad Sobernheim and Odernheim am Glan belonging to the Archbishopric of Mainz, those around Baumholder and Medard belonging to the Bishopric of Verdun, those around Obermoschel belonging to the Bishopric of Worms and the Remigiusland around Kusel belonging to the Archbishopric of Reims. Adenbach lay within this new County of Veldenz and was later repeatedly wholly or partly granted as a fief to comital vassals. In 1379, Adenbach had its first documentary mention in a document from the County of Veldenz, in which the knight Mohr von Sötern acknowledged that he had been enfeoffed by his lordship Junker Friedrich, Count at Veldenz, with holdings in the villages of Heinzenhausen, Lohnweiler, Lauterecken, Medard, Roth, Schwanden (a now vanished village near Medard), Obersulzbach, Niedersulzbach, Ginsweiler, Mannweiler (a now vanished village) and Odenbach and in the town of Meisenheim. This was a first documentary mention not only for Adenbach (Odenbach), but also for Ginsweiler, Mannweiler and the two Sulzbachs (now Sulzbachtal). Junker Friedrich was Count Friedrich II of the younger line of the Counts of Veldenz. In a similar deposition from 1380, a knight named Gerhard von Alsenz likewise acknowledged receipt of holdings from Count Friedrich II, namely a share of Castle Odenbach and also “interest” from various villages, among them Adenbach, Mannweiler and Ginsweiler. From a 1415 document comes word that Friedrich III, the last count in the line (he died in 1444 without a male heir), took Syfryd vom Obirnstein (Siegfried von Oberstein) as a vassal. He enfeoffed his new man with many holdings and income rights, even with shares in Castle Odenbach and lands in several villages, among them Adenbach and the now vanished village of Mannweiler.

=== Modern times ===
The Counts Palatine (Dukes) of Zweibrücken introduced the Reformation as early as 1537. According to the 1609 Visitation, there were 15 families living in the village. The 17th century was largely marked by wars, such as the Thirty Years' War and French King Louis XIV's wars of conquest. The somewhat remote villages suffered all the more from hunger and sickness. The grimmest hardships began in 1635. In general, an unimaginable brutalization of morals came over people. From that time comes a report according to which two men from Adenbach, with their wives’ help, beat a man from Odenbach in the countryside and took his livestock from the pasture. In 1645, five Swedes came to Adenbach and stole, with two local men's help, cows, horses and sheep, all of which they took away, never to be seen again, and that after having spent the night in the village and incurred considerable costs. By the time the Thirty Years' War ended, the number of families in the village had shrunk to five. Still available today is a 1629 list of holdings and taxes in Adenbach, which was still owned by the Lords of Oberstein. All that is known from the time of Louis XIV's wars is lists of contributions. In the time that followed, population figures rose quickly, partly as a result of immigration. In the course of the 18th century, though, there was extensive emigration. That century also saw repeated disputes between Adenbach and neighbouring villages over grazing rights. A comprehensive village régime from 1717, contained in which is a considerably older Weistum (a Weistum – cognate with English wisdom – was a legal pronouncement issued by men learned in law in the Middle Ages and early modern times), remained preserved for Adenbach. As in many of the Northern Palatinate's other villages, a coal mine and a chalk mine were opened in Adenbach. All around the village, remnants of pits may still be found, where coal was once mined.

==== Recent times ====
During the time of the French Revolution and Napoleonic times, France had annexed the German lands on the Rhine’s left bank, and all the borders of the now abolished feudal states had been swept away. Under this new arrangement, Adenbach was a village in the Mairie (“Mayoralty”) of Becherbach in the Canton of Lauterecken in the Arrondissement of Kaiserslautern in the Department of Mont-Tonnerre (or Donnersberg in German). After the united Prussian, Russian and Austrian troops had emerged victorious over Napoleon, Blücher crossed the Rhine on New Year's Night 1814, and the French withdrew from their annexed German lands. Adenbach passed in 1816 to the Kingdom of Bavaria after the Congress of Vienna had awarded the Palatinate – which was now to be known as the Bavarian Rheinkreis – to that state. Adenbach thereafter belonged to the Bürgermeisterei (“Mayoralty”) of Odenbach in the Canton of Lauterecken and the Landkommissariat of Kusel. At the time of the Palatine Uprising in 1849, the municipality refused to recruit soldiers or support the freedom movement. A contribution of 40 Gulden, which municipal council eventually approved, did not have to be paid, for the uprising had in the meantime collapsed. When the state of Rhineland-Palatinate was founded and the Palatinate was split away from Bavaria after the Second World War, existing territorial arrangements were otherwise unchanged at first. Only in the course of administrative restructuring in Rhineland-Palatinate in 1968 did Adenbach pass to the then newly founded Verbandsgemeinde of Lauterecken, with effect from 1 January 1972.

=== Population development ===
The village remains to this day rurally structured. The greater part of the population worked until the Second World War at agriculture. Alongside farmers were craftsmen. Agriculture employs very few nowadays. Most members of the workforce seek their livelihoods outside the village. Adenbach is thus a rural residential community. It was in the Late Middle Ages very small, but had grown by the time of the Thirty Years' War, only to see its population shrink drastically in the wake of that war.. During the 18th and 19th centuries, strong growth once again began, only to fall off once more in the decades following the Second World War. Currently, too, a slight fall in population is noticeable. Already by 1994, some 27% of the population was aged 60 or over.

The following table shows population development over the centuries for Adenbach, with some figures broken down by religious denomination:

Year	1609	1656	1764	1825	1905	1939	1945	1961	1999	2007	2010
Total	~55	~20	95	197	225	218	224	191	185	182	174
Catholic				61				30
Evangelical				164				151
Other				–				10

=== Municipality’s name ===
Sources yield at least two stories about how Adenbach got its name:

- According to one, the name Adenbach is derived from the name of the brook that flows through the village, the Odenbach, which was once named the Adolfsbach.
- According to another, the village was originally a very small settlement on the brook, a farm belonging to somebody named “Ado”. The name Adenbach in its current form first cropped up in the 1379 document (first documentary mention) mentioned above, and the following year the name was recorded as Adinbach and in 1483 as Alt-Adenbach. It was Adenbach once again in 1490.

=== Vanished villages ===
In the south of Adenbach's municipal area, most likely near the strip field called Brunnenrech, once lay a village named Mannweiler. By the late 16th century, it was no longer being named in documents and is thought to have vanished even before the Thirty Years' War. Mannweiler might have been an early Frankish founding, possibly described as “Manno’s Hamlet” (according to Dolch and Greule) or “Mannifrit’s Hamlet” (according to Wendel; the placename ending —weiler is German for “hamlet”). Mannweiler had its first documentary mention in 1379.

== Religion ==
From the Early Middle Ages, the village belonged to the Glan Chapter and was a branch parish of the church of Medard. After Count Wolfgang introduced the Reformation into the County Palatine of Zweibrücken about 1537, all the villagers had to convert to Martin Luther’s beliefs under the old rule of cuius regio, eius religio. Everybody likewise had to convert in 1588 when their overlords decreed that John Calvin’s beliefs were now the law of the land. Only after the Thirty Years’ War were people once more allowed to practise Catholicism, or indeed Lutheranism, if they so wished. By immigration into the depopulated region and through promotion of Catholicism by the French during King Louis XIV's wars of conquest, the share of the village's population that embraced the Catholic faith grew. Adenbach, however, remained mostly Reformed (that is, Calvinist). In 1817 came the Palatine Protestant Union, which united Calvinists and Lutherans. Of the 225 inhabitants in 1825, 164 were Protestant and 61 Roman Catholic, a considerably greater share of the population than they have today. There were 30 Catholics among the 181 villagers in 1964. In 1994, out of 191 inhabitants, 145 claimed to be Evangelical and 31 Catholic; the remaining 15 claimed no membership in any religious community. The Evangelical Christians belong today to the parish of Odenbach in the deaconry of Lauterecken, while the Catholic Christians belong to the parish of Lauterecken (until 1975, the parish of Reipoltskirchen) in the deaconry of Kusel. Adenbach has never had its own church.

== Politics ==
=== Municipal council ===
The council is made up of 6 council members, who were elected by majority vote at the municipal election held on 7 June 2009, and the honorary mayor as chairman.

=== Mayor ===
Adenbach's mayor is Jürgen Klein, and his deputies are Frank Rittmann and Christian Faust.

=== Coat of arms ===
The municipality's arms might be described thus: Per bend sinister wavy argent issuant from the line of partition a lion azure armed and langued gules and sable in base an ear of rye and one of wheat couped in base Or and to sinister a coalminer's lamp of the same, the flame proper.

The charge on the dexter (armsbearer's right, viewer's left) side is the heraldic emblem formerly borne by the Counts of Veldenz, who were the local rulers in the Middle Ages. The charges on the sinister (armsbearer's left, viewer's right) side represent the village's coalmining history (the coalminer's lamp) and agricultural heritage (the ears of grain). The tinctures on this side are also historically borne by the Palatinate. The wavy line of partition is canting for the placename ending –bach, a reference to the village's namesake brook (Bach is German for “brook”).

The arms have been borne since 6 November 1979.

== Culture and sightseeing ==
=== Regular events ===
Most old customs have fallen by the wayside in Adenbach, and are hardly practised anymore, but there is a yearly kermis held on the last weekend in August.

=== Clubs ===
Adenbach once had a longstanding singing club, founded in 1847, but dissolved in 1960. A cycling club called All Heil’ fared even less well, having been founded in 1925 and lasting only about five years. A fruitgrowing club came into being in 1906, but became inactive during the First World War, never to be revived. The only four clubs that still exist today are:

- Landfrauenverein Odenbach/Adenbach (countrywomen's club)
- Pfälzer Bauern- und Winzerschaft (Palatine Farmers’ and Winegrowers’ Association – Adenbach chapter)
- Verein der Freunde und Förderer der Freiwilligen Feuerwehr (Friends and Promoters of the Volunteer Fire Brigade)
- Verein Adenbacher Dorfgemeinschaft (community club)

== Economy and infrastructure ==
=== Transport ===
Adenbach lies on Landesstraße 382 (Odenbach—Kaiserslautern). To the north runs Bundesstraße 420. The Autobahn interchanges are quite far away (Kaiserslautern 30 km, Kusel 38 km, Wörrstadt 45 km). Serving nearby Lauterecken is a railway station on the Lautertalbahn (Kaiserslautern—Lauterecken-Grumbach) some 6 km away. The former railway station at Odenbach lay only 3 km away, but this is now closed.

=== Economic structure ===
Originally, the villagers earned their livelihoods almost exclusively from agriculture. Besides small craft operations, there was also a mill. The Adenbacher Mühle, as it was called, arose after the Thirty Years' War, and was shut down for the last time in 1979. For a long time, chalk was mined and fired into quicklime. Three mines (St. Lorenzigrube, St. Jakobsgrube, Ludwigsgrube) yielded considerable amounts of coal in the 18th and 19th centuries. In the late 18th and early 19th century, wandering Musikanten set out from Adenbach, among other places in the region, and travelled to many parts of the world.

=== Education ===
After the Reformation, the Dukes of Zweibrücken strove to promote schooling in the duchy, their first and foremost goal being to give their subjects the ability to grapple with the Bible by themselves. The good beginnings suffered a setback with the Thirty Years' War, and during the 18th century, schooling had to be developed all over again. Classes were organized through the church, and not seldom taught by the clergyman himself. Children from small villages had to attend school in the village of the parish mother church at first. For Adenbach schoolchildren, this meant that they had to go to school in Medard. In 1666, a teacher born in Adenbach wanted to obtain a teaching post in Medard, but was turned down. In 1673, the government allowed children from Adenbach to attend school at the more conveniently located school in Odenbach. From the time about 1700 come records showing that two children of the Lutheran faith were attending the Lutheran school in Meisenheim. From the early 18th century on, a winter school (a school geared towards an agricultural community's practical needs, held in the winter, when farm families had a bit more time to spare) was open in Adenbach. In 1708, the teacher Hans Conrad Höhn, from Medard, came to Adenbach and taught until 1731. The series of Höhn's successors is listed in Wendel's village chronicle right up to the dissolution of the local school in 1966. Six barrels of grain were delivered to the teacher Prass in 1762 for his troubles, and in money he received 2 Gulden, 8 Batzen and 2 Pfennige. The teacher's dwelling in Adenbach back then was obviously not very comfortable. At the married teacher Jakob Matheis's disposal in 1776 was a dwelling with a parlour and one small room. Luckily, he and his wife had only one child. In schools in those days, especially in winter schools, heating problems were always arising. The municipality delivered to the school in 1776 20 Maß of coal from the village colliery for heating. Most classes were held in private houses before the municipality had its own schoolhouse, but as early as 1742, Adenbach had one of these. In 1820, the municipality wanted to build a new schoolhouse, but then decided to trade the old schoolhouse for a suitable new house. This house was converted at a cost of 1,589 Gulden. As the village's population rose markedly in those days, so too did the number of the village's schoolchildren (32 schoolchildren in 1820; 60 schoolchildren in 1853). Accordingly, the municipality had the schoolhouse expanded in 1868. In 1937, the Pfalz Regierungsbezirk administration converted the hitherto “Protestant School” after a plebiscite into a “Christian Unity School” (Christliche Einheitsschule). In 1938, year level 8 was introduced, but the pupils at this level had to go to school in Odenbach. The school remained until its closure in 1966 a one-room school. Afterwards, the schoolhouse was converted into a community centre. Primary school pupils nowadays attend school in Odenbach, while Hauptschule students go to school in Lauterecken. The nearest Gymnasien are the ones in Lauterecken and Meisenheim.
