= Wolfstein (Verbandsgemeinde) =

Collective municipality in Rhineland-Palatinate, Germany

Coordinates: 49.580°N 7.600°E

Wolfstein (German pronunciation: [ˈvɔlfˌʃtaɪ̯n]) is a former Verbandsgemeinde ("collective municipality") in the district of Kusel, Rhineland-Palatinate, Germany. The seat of the Verbandsgemeinde was in Wolfstein. On 1 July 2014 it merged into the new Verbandsgemeinde Lauterecken-Wolfstein.

The Verbandsgemeinde Wolfstein consisted of the following Ortsgemeinden ("local municipalities"):

1. Aschbach
2. Einöllen
3. Eßweiler
4. Hefersweiler
5. Hinzweiler
6. Jettenbach
7. Kreimbach-Kaulbach
8. Nußbach
9. Oberweiler im Tal
10. Oberweiler-Tiefenbach
11. Reipoltskirchen
12. Relsberg
13. Rothselberg
14. Rutsweiler an der Lauter
15. Wolfstein
