= Oberweiler-Tiefenbach =

- Municipality
- Coat of arms

- Location of Oberweiler-Tiefenbach within Kusel district
- Interactive map of Oberweiler-Tiefenbach
- Location within Germany Location within Rhineland-Palatinate
- Coordinates: 49°35′52″N 7°36′32″E
- Country: Germany
- State: Rhineland-Palatinate
- District: Kusel
- Municipal assoc.: Lauterecken-Wolfstein
- Subdivisions: 2 Ortsteile

Government
  - Mayor (2019–24): Günter Schwambach

Area
  - Total: 3.21 km^{2} (1.24 sq mi)
- Elevation: 180 m (590 ft)

Population (2025-12-31)
  - Total: 257
  - Density: 80.1/km^{2} (207/sq mi)
- Time zone: UTC+01:00 (CET)
  - Summer (DST): UTC+02:00 (CEST)
- Postal codes: 67752
- Dialling codes: 06304
- Vehicle registration: KUS

Oberweiler-Tiefenbach is an Ortsgemeinde – a municipality belonging to a Verbandsgemeinde, a kind of collective municipality – in the Kusel district in Rhineland-Palatinate, Germany. It belongs to the Verbandsgemeinde Lauterecken-Wolfstein.

== Geography ==
=== Location ===
Oberweiler-Tiefenbach lies on the river Lauter's right bank northeast of the Königsberg in the North Palatine Uplands. Originally two separate villages, the municipality's two centres lie at an elevation of some 185 m above sea level, Oberweiler lying farther upstream at the mill, and Tiefenbach lying farther downstream at the church standing near the mountain slope. Between the two centres flows the Breitbach, which then empties into the Lauter. The elevations east of the village reach heights of up to roughly 370 m above sea level (Eichelberg 368 m). The municipal area measures ha, of which roughly 15 ha is settled and 80 ha is wooded.

=== Neighbouring municipalities ===
Oberweiler-Tiefenbach borders in the north on the municipality of Hohenöllen and the Reckweilerhof (which belongs to Wolfstein), in the east on the municipality of Einöllen and in the south and west on the town of Wolfstein. Oberweiler-Tiefenbach also meets the municipality of Heinzenhausen at a single point in the northwest.

=== Constituent communities ===
Oberweiler-Tiefenbach's Ortsteile are Oberweiler and Tiefenbach.

=== Municipality’s layout ===
The two villages, which over time have grown together into one, stretch as a long linear village (or by some definitions, a “thorpe”) along the Lauter's right bank. The river here also forms Wolfstein's town limit. The road along which the village stretches, nowadays known as Landesstraße 49, was originally the main link in the Lauter valley. A small concentration of building stands in Oberweiler's south end near the mill, where a bridge over to the river's left bank is also to be found. Another bridge linking to Bundesstraße 270 and the stop on the Lauter Valley Railway (Lautertalbahn) is found in the village's north. Likewise in the north end stands the old church, an eye-catching sight in the Lauter valley. The church is surrounded by the graveyard. The former school, which for a time was used as a special school, stands in the Breitbach valley. Part of the industrial property owned by the firm K. O. Braun, a textile factory, lies within Oberweiler-Tiefenbach's limits.

== History ==
=== Antiquity ===
It is certain that the area around Oberweiler-Tiefenbach was settled in prehistoric times, bearing witness to which is a wealth of prehistoric archaeological finds, especially from the neighbouring municipalities. Within Einöllen’s limits, near the municipal limit with Oberweiler-Tiefenbach, roughly a dozen stone hatchets were unearthed before the First World War, which are now believed to be in private ownership. No finds from Roman times in Oberweiler-Tiefenbach are directly known.

=== Middle Ages ===
Both Oberweiler and Tiefenbach, neither of which had even yet had its first documentary mention, lay in the Nahegau and passed with the Unteramt of Einöllen to the County of Veldenz when it was founded in 1126. Both villages were very small. Indeed, it is likely that Oberweiler was for a long time nothing more than a feudal estate. Hence, it is quite understandable that so little information about these places has reached the present day from the Middle Ages. In 1290, Oberweiler had its first documentary mention, while Tiefenbach had its first documentary mention in 1316. Besides the documents containing the villages’ first documentary mentions, Oberweiler crops up in a further mediaeval document from 1296 with its modern spelling, otherwise appearing as Deiffenbach in 1323, as Diffenbach in 1333 and as Dieffenbach in 1412. In 1387, both centres, along with the whole Amt of Hohenöllen, passed to Count Friedrich II of Veldenz, apparently by way of inheritance, for Friedrich's elder brother Heinrich also received certain properties, among them the Welthersbuch, the Busch and the Treppelswiese at Tiefenbach. Both villages seem to have been left out of the 1393 Veldenz letter of bestowal for this reason. In 1444, the County of Veldenz met its end when Count Friedrich III of Veldenz died without a male heir. His daughter Anna wed King Ruprecht's son Count Palatine Stephan. By uniting his own Palatine holdings with the now otherwise heirless County of Veldenz – his wife had inherited the county, but not her father's title – and by redeeming the hitherto pledged County of Zweibrücken, Stephan founded a new County Palatine, as whose comital residence he chose the town of Zweibrücken: the County Palatine – later Duchy – of Palatinate-Zweibrücken. The Amt of Einöllen, and along with it the villages of Oberweiler and Tiefenbach, now found themselves in this new state.

=== Modern times ===
In the 16th and 17th centuries, both Oberweiler and Tiefenbach shared a history with the Unteramt of Einöllen within the County Palatine of Zweibrücken, which later was usually called a duchy. During the Thirty Years' War, both villages were utterly destroyed, were empty of people and had to be settled all over again. Two decades before the collapse of the old feudal order (1768), the Unteramt of Einöllen passed under the terms of the Treaty of Schwetzingen, or Treaty of Selz-Hagenbach, to Electoral Palatinate. At the same time, this decision brought about a split from the Palatinate-Zweibrücken Oberamt of Meisenheim and the Unteramt was then grouped into the Electoral Palatinate Amt of Wolfstein, which itself belonged to the Oberamt of Kaiserslautern. It was at about this time that the two villages must have merged into one. The Electoral Palatinate geographer Goswin Widder described Oberweiler and Tiefenbach thus in 1788 (he wrongly refers to Tiefenbach as Tiefenthal): “These two little villages make up only one municipality, and lie a quarter hour from each other, both on the river Lauter downstream from Wolfstein. Running westwards by both villages is the Lauter, which near Oberweiler drives one of the gristmills answerable to the Electoral Court Chamber (Kurfürstliche Hofkammer). In Tiefenthal a toll is levied.”

==== Recent times ====
During the time of the French Revolution and the Napoleonic era that followed, the German lands on the Rhine’s left bank were annexed by France. With the new political arrangement and within the new boundaries, Oberweiler-Tiefenbach found itself in the Canton of Wolfstein, the Arrondissement of Kaiserslautern and the Department of Mont-Tonnerre (or Donnersberg in German) whose seat was at Mainz. After French rule, once Napoleon had been driven out of the country, the Congress of Vienna drew new boundaries yet again. After a transitional time, Oberweiler-Tiefenbach was grouped into the bayerischer Rheinkreis, later known as Rheinpfalz (“Rhenish Palatinate”), an exclave of the Kingdom of Bavaria in 1816, where it lay within the Bürgermeisterei (“mayoralty”) of Wolfstein, the Canton (later Distrikt, until about the First World War) of Wolfstein and the Landcommissariat (today Landkreis or district) of Kusel. In the late 1920s and early 1930s, the Nazi Party (NSDAP) was quite popular in Oberweiler-Tiefenbach. In the 1928 Reichstag elections, 30.6% of the local votes went to Adolf Hitler’s party, but by the 1930 Reichstag elections, this had grown to 48.6%. By the time of the 1933 Reichstag elections, after Hitler had already seized power, local support for the Nazis had swollen to 87.6%. Hitler’s success in these elections paved the way for his Enabling Act of 1933 (Ermächtigungsgesetz), thus starting the Third Reich in earnest. In the course of administrative restructuring in Rhineland-Palatinate in 1968, Oberweiler-Tiefenbach became an Ortsgemeinde within the Verbandsgemeinde of Wolfstein in 1972.

=== Population development ===
The village was long characterized by agriculture. Even today, the municipal area is used for farming, though the number of farmers has become small. Oberweiler-Tiefenbach is thus a small residential community with employment opportunities in the local towns (Wolfstein, Lauterecken and Kaiserslautern). The population figures over the last couple of centuries have held more or less steady. The drop in the earlier half of the 20th century can be ascribed to a problematic employment situation, and the rise after the Second World War may be ascribed to the village’s proximity to the Braun bandage factory in Wolfstein.

The following table shows population development over the centuries for Oberweiler-Tiefenbach, with some figures broken down by religious denomination:

| Year | 1788 | 1825 | 1835 | 1871 | 1905 | 1939 | 1961 | 2001 | 2005 | 2007 |
| Total | 229 | 308 | 347 | 334 | 333 | 271 | 285 | 312 | 301 | 309 |
| Catholic | 39 | | | | | 17 |
| Evangelical | 269 | | | | | 268 |

=== Municipality’s names ===
Since the municipality has a “double-barrelled name”, there are actually two names to interpret. Oberweiler has a meaning that is perfectly comprehensible to a modern-day German speaker (it would be expressed oberer Weiler today), namely “upper hamlet”, and it was so named to distinguish it from a now vanished and forgotten “lower hamlet”. The Verbandsgemeinde website states that Oberweiler was for a time also called Unterweiler to distinguish it from the nearby municipality of Oberweiler im Tal, making Oberweiler itself the “lower hamlet”, at least in name. As early as 1290, a document, whose content is now known only from a copy, mentions the modern name Oberweiler. More exact data about just how long before its first documentary mention the hamlet was founded cannot be ascertained. The name Tiefenbach first crops up in an original document from 1316 as Dyffenbach. The ending —bach (“brook”) refers to the Breitbach.

== Religion ==
From the 14th century onwards, the village of Tiefenbach was the seat of a parish, to which other villages on the Lauter's right bank also belonged, namely Stahlhausen, Roßbach, Oberweiler, Hohenöllen and Einöllen, among which Roßbach and Einöllen had their own churches. In 1412, Count Friedrich III of Veldenz transferred the parish to the Knights Hospitaller in Meisenheim. In the time of the Counts Palatine (Dukes) of Zweibrücken, the Reformation was introduced, and by 1528, there was a Lutheran pastor. All the parish's worshippers thus had to convert to Lutheran beliefs, at least at first. Later, in 1588, they had to convert yet again, this time to Reformed (Calvinist) beliefs. After the Thirty Years' War, other denominations were once again allowed, though the overwhelming majority in both Oberweiler and Tiefenbach remained Reformed, or after the 1818 Protestant Union, Evangelical. The church that now stands in Oberweiler-Tiefenbach dates from 1753.

== Politics ==
=== Municipal council ===
The council is made up of 6 council members, who were elected by majority vote at the municipal election held on 7 June 2009, and the honorary mayor as chairman.

=== Mayor ===
Oberweiler-Tiefenbach's mayor is Günter Schwambach, and his deputies are Annemarie Geib and Wilhelm Doll.

=== Coat of arms ===
The German blazon reads: In Gold ein gesenkter blauer Wellenbalken, belegt mit einem linksgewendeten silbernen Fisch, daraus hervorwachsend ein schwarzes Mühlrad, beseitet von je einer roten Spindel.

The municipality's arms might in English heraldic language be described thus: Or a fess abased wavy azure surmounted by a fish sinister argent and issuant from which a waterwheel spoked of four sable between in chief two spindles gules.

The tinctures match those borne by Oberweiler-Tiefenbach's former lords, Electoral Palatinate and Palatinate-Zweibrücken. The wavy fess (horizontal stripe) is meant to stand for the river Lauter, which flows by both the municipality's centres, and the fish refers to the wealth of fish once found in it. The remaining charge, the spindles, are to be understood as a reference to the textile industry.

== Culture and sightseeing ==
=== Buildings ===
The following are listed buildings or sites in Rhineland-Palatinate’s Directory of Cultural Monuments:

- Protestant church, Kirchstraße 10 – Baroque aisleless church, marked 1753; Walcker organ from 1893, clergyman’s gravestone from the 17th century; in the graveyard warriors’ memorial 1914-1918 and 1939-1945 from 1956, gravestones from 1862 to 1918
- Hauptstraße 1, 2, 3 – former Leppla mill estate; whole complex of buildings with no. 1 former oilmill, no. 3 gristmill, no. 2 across from the estate, bridge and weir facility; no. 3 four-sided complex with three-floor mill and dwelling wing, 1809, two-floor commercial building; no. 2 Quereinhaus (a combination residential and commercial house divided for these two purposes down the middle, perpendicularly to the street), 1830; bridge across the Lauter, 1866, architect Johann Schmeisser, Kusel

=== Regular events ===
Oberweiler-Tiefenbach's kermis (church consecration festival, locally known as the Kerwe) is held each year on the third weekend in September. The customs observed locally are generally the same as those elsewhere in the region.

=== Clubs ===
Currently, there are three clubs in Oberweiler-Tiefenbach: a mixed choir, the Brunnenclub (“well club” or “fountain club”) and a nursing association.

== Economy and infrastructure ==
=== Economic structure ===
Besides agriculture, there were formerly also the customary craft occupations. The Oberweiler mill was likely built in the early 18th century. It had two waterwheels for two grist runs and one husking run. The miller had taken it over into Erbbestand (a uniquely German landhold arrangement in which ownership rights and usage rights were separated; this is forbidden by law in modern Germany) and in 1745 had to pay the lordship in Zweibrücken 12 Malter of corn (wheat or rye) and 12 Malter of oats. This high rental charge shows that even then, the mill was highly productive. It stayed in service until after the Second World War. The waterwheels are still preserved. The area's collieries and quarries, too, offered job opportunities. Today, the nearest big industrial concern is the Braun textile mill headquartered in Wolfstein. In the village itself are a paving company, a building consultancy and a chimney restoration company. An inn (pizzeria and ristorante) can also still be found in Oberweiler-Tiefenbach.

=== Education ===
It is highly likely that there were already efforts as early as the 16th century to teach the village's children to read and write, since the Counts Palatine of Zweibrücken had introduced the Reformation and it was in their interest to put children in a position to be able to read the Bible for themselves. As early as the time when Goswin Widder wrote his report (1788), a schoolhouse in Oberweiler-Tiefenbach was mentioned. About 1850, it was replaced with a more sophisticated building. A further schoolhouse was built after the Second World War. This later building housed classes of the school for children with learning difficulties for a decade after the local school was dissolved in 1968. Today, primary school pupils and Hauptschule students attend classes at their respective schools in Wolfstein. Gymnasien are to be found in Lauterecken and Kaiserslautern.

=== Transport ===
Running by the village, just across the river Lauter, is Bundesstraße 270, which links Idar-Oberstein with Kaiserslautern. Lauterecken lies 7 km away, while to Kaiserslautern it is 24 km and to Kusel 38 km. The nearest Autobahn interchanges are near Kaiserslautern and Kusel. At the Reckweilerhof, an outlying centre of Wolfstein, and in Wolfstein itself, are railway stations on the Lauter Valley Railway (Lautertalbahn).

== Famous people ==
=== Famous people associated with the municipality ===
Eugen Müller (b. 1880 in Gerhardsbrunn; d. 1955 in Ludwigshafen) — While a schoolteacher in Oberweiler-Tiefenbach, Müller dedicated himself to botany, particularly research into the blackberry (leading to a nickname, “Brombeermüller”, from Brombeere, the German word for blackberry), and he was said to be one of the Palatinate's foremost experts in floristics. He is now buried at Oberweiler-Tiefenbach's graveyard.
