= Wolfstein, Rhineland-Palatinate =

Wolfstein
- Town
- Coat of arms

- Location of Wolfstein within Kusel district
- Interactive map of Wolfstein
- Location within Germany Location within Rhineland-Palatinate
- Coordinates: 49°35′3″N 7°36′22″E
- Country: Germany
- State: Rhineland-Palatinate
- District: Kusel
- Municipal assoc.: Lauterecken-Wolfstein

Government
  - Mayor (2019–24): Herwart Dilly

Area
  - Total: 13.75 km^{2} (5.31 sq mi)
- Elevation: 189 m (620 ft)

Population (2025-12-31)
  - Total: 1,796
  - Density: 130.6/km^{2} (338.3/sq mi)
- Time zone: UTC+01:00 (CET)
  - Summer (DST): UTC+02:00 (CEST)
- Postal codes: 67752
- Dialling codes: 06304
- Vehicle registration: KUS, WOS
- Website: www.wolfstein.de

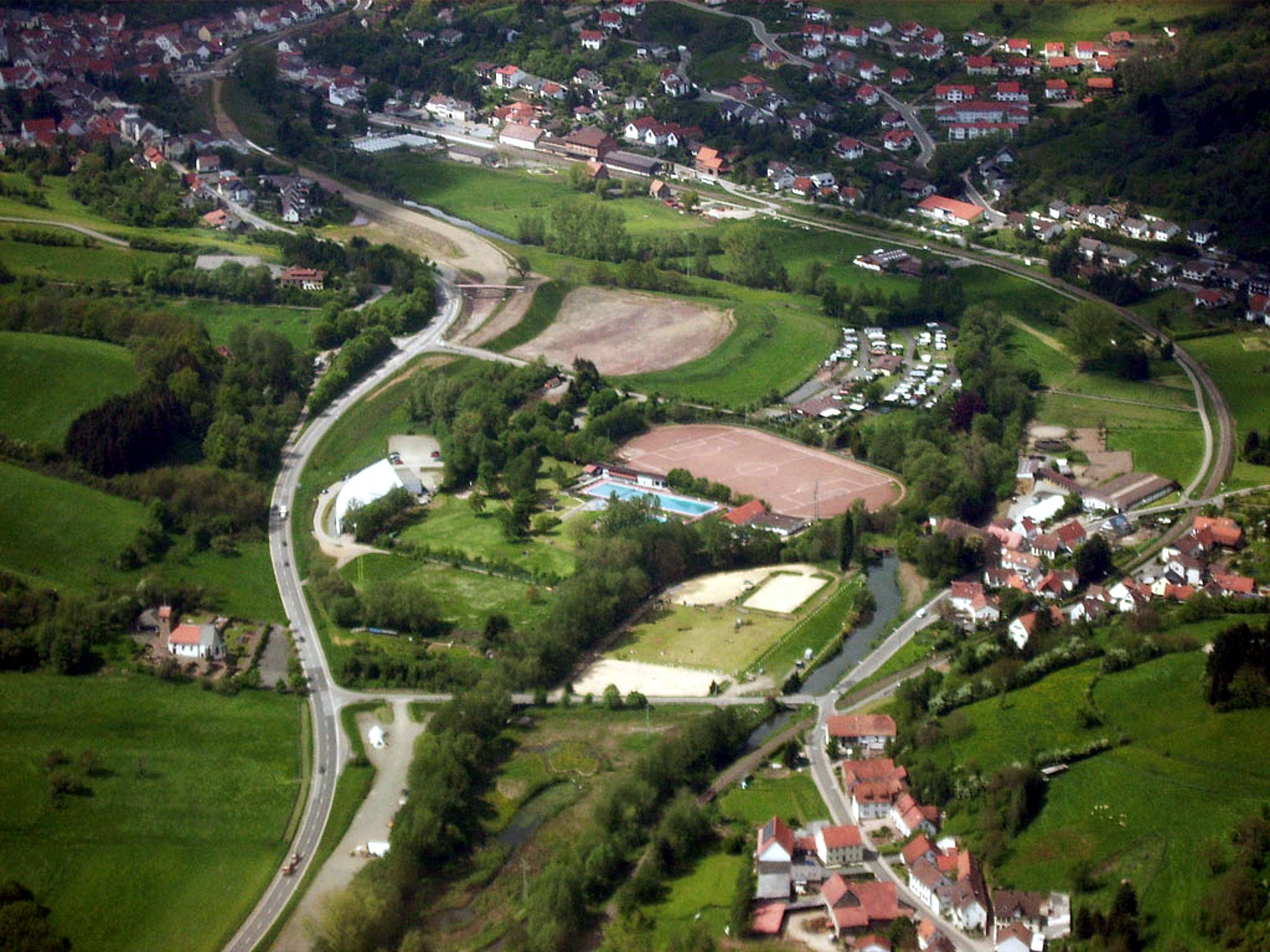
Southern Wolfstein from the air, including the Sports and Recreation Centre

Wolfstein (German pronunciation: [ˈvɔlfˌʃtaɪn]) is a town in the Kusel district in Rhineland-Palatinate, Germany. Before 1 July 2014 it was the seat of the like-named Verbandsgemeinde, since then it is part of the Verbandsgemeinde Lauterecken-Wolfstein. Wolfstein is known for its two castle ruins, Neu-Wolfstein standing over the heart of the town, and Alt-Wolfstein standing at the narrowest spot in the Lauter valley at the town's northern entrance. Wolfstein is a state-recognized recreational resort (Erholungsort).

== Geography ==
=== Location ===
The town lies in the North Palatine Uplands, in the so-called Königsland (“Kingsland”), between Idar-Oberstein and Kaiserslautern. The municipal area measures 1 377 ha, of which 644 ha is wooded. Also, 154 ha is given over to residential properties and transport facilities, 574 ha to agriculture and 5 ha is taken up by other uses and open water. Geographically, the municipal area belongs to the Glan-Alsenz mountain and hill country, which meets the Kaiserslauterer Senke (a depression) to the north. The town centre lies in the Lauter valley, cut narrowly into the land, between the steep slopes on either side of the Lauter, the Königsberg on the left bank and the Eisenknopf on the right. The Königsberg (not to be confused with the former East Prussian city) is the town's highest point at 568.4 m above sea level. Other selected elevations are as follows:

- Lang-Heck (Roßbach) — 404.1 m
- Neu-Wolfstein castle ruin — 238 m
- Stahlhausen valley floor (southern town limit) — 196 m
- Wolfstein railway station — 187.9 m

The town lies roughly 23 km northeast of Kusel, and 20 km northwest of Kaiserslautern.

=== Neighbouring municipalities ===
Wolfstein borders in the north on the municipalities of Lohnweiler and Heinzenhausen, in the northeast on the municipalities of Oberweiler-Tiefenbach and Einöllen, in the east on the municipality of Relsberg, in the southeast on the municipality of Niederkirchen, in the south on the municipality of Kreimbach-Kaulbach, in the southwest on the municipality of Rutsweiler an der Lauter and in the west on the municipality of Aschbach. Wolfstein also meets the municipalities of Hohenöllen, Eßweiler and Offenbach-Hundheim at single points in the northeast, southwest and northwest respectively.

=== Constituent communities ===
Wolfstein's Stadtteile are the main townsite, also called Wolfstein (1,792), Roßbach (178) and Reckweilerhof (11). The figures are populations as at 2007.

=== Town’s layout ===
Until 1905, the town's municipal area was limited to the area on the Lauter's left bank between Rutsweiler to the south, Lohnweiler to the north and Aschbach to the west. According to the original Bavarian cadastral survey (about 1840), Wolfstein's area measured 616 ha. In the 174 houses at that time lived 826 persons.

Spreading out from the old town (known as the Flecken, meaning “market town”) in the hollow, the settled parts of town lay in the 19th century on the slopes between the Tauchental (dale) and Schlossgasse (or Obergasse – a lane), on the narrow strips of land either side of Lauterstraße (or Untergasse) and on Hauptstraße (“Main Street”, but in an outlying neighbourhood). Worth mentioning are several old buildings in Wolfstein: the Evangelical church (1868, beside the town hall), the Catholic rectory (1845, outside town centre), the Evangelical rectory (1899, outside town centre), the court and prison building (1902/1903, outside town centre) and the former Kurhaus Lautertal (spa hotel, 1862, renovated in 1912, outside town centre).

With the expansion of Wolfstein's inhabited area, the old town's girding, mediaeval wall, which still stood in the early 19th century, had gaps knocked through it and eventually, along with both the town gates and the Bürgerturm (tower), it was torn down altogether.

It was not possible to expand Wolfstein onto lands over on the Lauter's right bank, for stretching for roughly 4 km between Kreimbach and Oberweiler was the village of Roßbach with, as it had then, its five Ortsteile: Stahlhausen, Roßbach (main centre), Mühle, Immetshausen and Kuhbrücker Hübel. The gap between Stahlhausen and the upper village, and the one between Immetshausen and Kuhbrücke, were used for farming. Any building work worthy of note within Roßbach's limits was never to be seen even as late as 1969. The number of houses there, beginning in 1900, hovered around 100.

In 1905, the Bavarian State Government – the Palatinate had belonged to the Kingdom of Bavaria since the Congress of Vienna – ordered the cession of the Kuhbrücker Hübel, with its railway station, seven houses on the slope side of Bahnhofsstraße (“Station Street”), seven others on Hefersweilerstraße, a few storage sheds next to the railway and the storehouse of the Consumvereine (“coöperatives”), to the town of Wolfstein. The decisive factor in favour of the amalgamation of this strip of land on both sides of the railway line, which had been opened in 1883, was economic considerations. For the goal of expanding the town's residential area, however, it was quite useless, for the slopes east of the ceded area on the valley floor still belonged to Roßbach. Thus, until the village of Roßbach in der Pfalz along with all its Ortsteile was merged into the town of Wolfstein in 1969, the town's foremost new building area remained the steep slope stretching up the Königsberg west of Hauptstraße (Bundesstraße 270), even after the Second World War (Röther Weg, Steinwiesen, Am Hang, Am Gericht, In der Trift, Bergstraße, Am Kirchpfad). Even this was hemmed in somewhat by the galleries at the chalk mine.

Beginning in 1970, work shifted to what had until recently been a self-administering, neighbouring village, and building began in Roßbach on formerly agricultural lands east of the railway line between Sandfeld (Immetshausen) and Eisenknopf (Schlettweg, Barbarossastraße, Habsburgerstraße, Kurpfalzstraße, Stauferstraße, Wingerstbergstraße, Hahnbach and Sandfeld). By 2000, 78 residential buildings had arisen here, mostly one- and two-family houses. The amalgamation increased Wolfstein's area by 616 ha to 1 377 ha.

=== Climate ===
Yearly precipitation in Wolfstein amounts to 729 mm, which falls into the middle third of the precipitation chart for all Germany. At 46% of the German Weather Service's weather stations, lower figures are recorded. The driest month is April. The most rainfall comes in June. In that month, precipitation is 1.4 times what it is in April. Precipitation varies only slightly and is spread extremely evenly over the year. Only at 1% of the weather stations are lower seasonal swings recorded.

== History ==
=== Antiquity ===
Archaeological finds from both the Old Stone Age and the New Stone Age on the Königsberg's and the Selberg's west flank, barrows in the Jungenwald (forest) at the town limits with Aschbach and Lohnweiler that have been explored and many finds of Roman coins with effigies of Roman emperors at the old Celtic settlement, which was once surrounded by a ringwall, on the Kreimberg at the town limit with Kreimbach-Kaulbach (known as the Heidenburg, or “Heathen Castle”) bear witness to the presence of people in what is now Wolfstein in prehistoric times and early historic times. Leading over the ridge of the Königsberg was the “Roman road”, one of the Palatinate's oldest settlement roads. Nevertheless, there was never any Roman settlement within what are now Wolfstein's limits.

=== Middle Ages ===
Until 1768, the river Lauter was a border, cleaving today's unified town into the town of Wolfstein on the one side, which was held by Electoral Palatinate, and the village of Roßbach on the other, which lay within territory held by the Dukes of Palatine Zweibrücken. The Reckweilerhof belonged as an either Ducal or Electoral fief to the holdings of the Offenbach am Glan Benedictine Monastery. These three centres, therefore, did not share a common history until that date, and accordingly, they are treated separately for the time up to the 18th century.

==== Wolfstein ====
Wolfstein was founded in 1275 on Habsburg King Rudolph I's orders, which called for a “fortified and free” town near his castle, “Woluisstein”, now known as the Alt-Wolfstein (“Old Wolfstein”) ruin. Rudolph forthwith granted the new town the same town rights and freedoms as the town of Speyer. As an “everlasting marketplace”, it was to be a sanctuary for commerce, trade and dealing. The first townsmen and -women came from the surrounding, much older villages.

Only for a few decades did the new town enjoy royal immediacy, whereafter it was passed time and again to and from various territorial lordships as a pledged holding. The almost endless chain of pledgings began as early as 1312 with the town's transfer to the Counts of Sponheim, and only ended in 1673 when the town passed to Electoral Palatinate. The Electoral Palatinate Amt (or Unteramt) of Wolfstein in the Oberamt of Kaiserslautern comprised the two court regions of Katzweiler and “Rothe am Seelberg” (Rothselberg).

==== Roßbach ====
The landholders in the Middle Ages (beginning in the 12th century) were the Counts of Veldenz. Far away from their small seat on the Moselle (Veldenz Castle), they owned considerable lands between the Alsenz, the Glan and the Nahe, among which was Honhelden daz ampt (1387), within which lay the settlements in question. Sometime about the middle of the 16th century, the Schultheiß’s seat was moved to Einöllen.

In the early 15th century, the Count’s only daughter (and indeed, only child) and sole heir wed Count Palatine Stephan of Zweibrücken from the House of Wittelsbach. After her father’s death in 1444, the now defunct (for a woman could not inherit the comital title, and there was no male heir) County of Veldenz passed by inheritance to her son, Ludwig I, who now bore the title Duke of Veldenz-Zweibrücken, thereby ushering in a long time of political stability for Roßbach. The village was spared the repeated transfers and pledgings that characterized the neighbouring town’s history at this time.

==== Reckweilerhof ====
Throughout the Middle Ages up until the beginning of the 19th century, noble feudal lords granted their vassals this estate for hereditary and proprietary use. The landholders at first were the Waldgraves and Raugraves of Grumbach, then the Counts of Veldenz (1387), and lastly, beginning in 1444, the Dukes of Palatine Zweibrücken, who were at the same time the guardians and patrons of all holdings belonging to the Offenbach Monastery, and (beginning in 1733) the Electors of the Palatinate.

The estate holders’ names from 1514 are known without any gaps in the record. They discharged their hereditary pledge to the monastery, receiving as a reward usage and grazing rights in the “lordly monastery woodlands”, “free lumber and firewood”, the “sheep meadow on the estate’s area as well as the municipal area of the market town of Wolfstein with its own herd of maximally 200 head” (1786).

=== Modern times ===
==== Wolfstein ====
The Amtskellerei, whose mostly noble Amtskeller were charged with executing princely orders, was to be found at Neu-Wolfstein Castle, and after that was destroyed in 1688 by King Louis XIV’s troops in the Nine Years' War (known in Germany as the Pfälzischer Erbfolgekrieg, or War of the Palatine Succession), at a small house beside the old town hall at the foot of the Schlossberg; beginning in 1753 it was at the great building before the outer town gate (today the town hall) built on Elector Karl Theodor’s (1742-1799) orders from Amtsgefällen – Amt taxes. By territorial swap between the Elector and the Duke of Zweibrücken in 1768, the places within the Schultheißerei of Einöllen (Einöllen, Hohenöllen, Tiefenbach, Oberweiler, Roßbach and Sulzhof) passed to Electoral Palatinate and were assigned to the Amt of Wolfstein.

The town’s days as an Electoral Palatinate holding came to an end when French Revolutionary troops occupied the lands on the Rhine’s left bank, including the town itself; by 1801, this territory had been annexed under the terms of the Treaty of Lunéville by the soon to be Napoleonic France. As early as 1797, Wolfstein became, in the course of administrative reform carried out by the French, a cantonal seat in the Arrondissement of Kaiserslautern and the Department of Mont-Tonnerre (or Donnersberg in German). Belonging to the canton were 32 municipalities with 8 mayors and roughly 8,000 inhabitants. The Mairie (“Mayoralty”) of Wolfstein comprised four municipalities with roughly 1,300 inhabitants; in the town itself lived 37 families and 311 persons. In 1814, the French withdrew from the Canton of Wolfstein.

==== Roßbach ====
From 1444 to 1768, the villagers of Roßbach were Ducal-Zweibrücken subjects. From this epoch, only a few noteworthy events are recorded:

The Roßbacher Weistum (1544 – a Weistum – cognate with English wisdom – was a legal pronouncement issued by men learned in law in the Middle Ages and early modern times) reported about yearly meetings of the Gemeinsmannen resident in Roßbach, Imzmannßhausen (about 1250: Ziermannshusen; today: Immetshausen), Melhausen (since vanished), Stohlhaussen (today: Stahlhausen) on Saint Dionysius’s Day (9 October) on the “Dionysiusberg (mountain) near the chapel to the saint, Dionysius” (today: Auf dem Mühlacker). The small house of worship was a chapel of ease in the parish of Tiefenbach, which found itself in the hands of the Order of Saint John from the early 15th century until the Reformation as a donation from the Counts of Veldenz. As early as 1528, Tiefenbach became a Reformed parish. The chapel was used into the 18th century for church services by Reformed worshippers, then also by Lutherans and Catholics. It was torn down in the 19th century, although the surrounding graveyard was still used as such until 1902. In the early 1930s, it was levelled during the building of the memorial square.

The Mühlarzt (“mill doctor”) Adam Silberwäscher from Baumholder built a gristmill with a millrace in 1604 on a “little stream up from the village called Roßbach”; it was the first mill recorded in Roßbach. It was, however, destroyed in the Thirty Years' War.

In 1695, Johannes Schwammbacher built a new gristmill downstream from Roßbach on the Lauter, “where none has ever stood before”. A new centre sprang up around the mill, Bei der Roßbacher Mühle (today: “In Mühlhausen” or “In der Hohl”).

Duke Christian IV of Zweibrücken transferred to Elector Palatine Karl Theodor the Schultheißerei of Einöllen. Five little villages were incorporated into the Unteramt of Wolfstein. The municipality of Roßbach comprised at this time 1,125 Morgen of cropland, 57 Morgen of meadows, 33 Morgen of vineyards, 10 Morgen of gardens and 137 Morgen of forest. Living in the village were 222 people. There were 42 houses, 1 church and 2 schools.

==== Reckweilerhof ====
From 1644 to 1788, the estate was run as an hereditary tenancy by the Amtsschultheiß at Odenbach am Glan and his heirs. After feudalism was abolished, the Ducal Württemberg Minister of State Emich Johann von Üxküll bought the estate for 22,500 Gulden. He let the estate in 1796 to Christoph Burckhardt, who transferred the running of the estate to his son Ludwig Karl Friedrich (born 1779). In 1817, Ludwig Burckhardt bought the estate, and ever since, it has been in the family Burckhardt’s ownership. Even today, Ludwig Burchhardt’s descendants, through his son Heinrich, still run the Hotel Reckweilerhof.

These statistics about the Reckweilerhof in the time just before the French Revolution are drawn from the 1786 Güterbestandsaufnahme (“Estate Inventory Record”):

Two-floor manor house; on 1st floor dwelling for “estate people”, on upper floor a spacious dwelling for the “lord of the manor”, three cattle stables, sheepcote for 300 head, a special dwelling for the shepherd, all together and under one roof; then barn, winepress house, vaulted cellar, herdsman’s house, bakehouse and 8 great pigsties; a well laid out seedling nursery.—52 Morgen of meadows, 4 Morgen of vineyards, 474 Morgen of cropfields and 19 Morgen of grazing fields. Estimated worth 22,000 Gulden.

==== Recent times ====
===== Kingdom of Bavaria times =====
After the new post-Napoleonic order imposed by the Congress of Vienna in 1814, Wolfsteiners became Bavarian nationals, which until 1918 meant the Bavarian king’s subjects; after monarchy was overthrown in 1918, they belonged to the Free State of Bavaria in the days of the Weimar Republic. Only in 1947, after the Second World War, did the Palatinate formally cease to be a Bavarian exclave, whereupon it was incorporated into the then newly founded state of Rhineland-Palatinate. The break with Bavaria was confirmed by referendum on 22 April 1956.

In the “Bavarian Rhine District” (Bayerischer Rheinkreis – that is, the Bavarian Palatinate), Wolfstein was grouped into the Landkommissariat of Kusel (from 1862 Bezirksamt and from 1939 Landratsamt).

To the Canton of Wolfstein in 1817 belonged 33 municipalities. The Bürgermeisterei (“mayoralty”) comprised the town with the Reckweilerhof, the municipalities of Einöllen (until 1900) and Roßbach (until 1905). From 1814 to 1832, the town administration was led by the physician Wilhelm Vogt as Oberbürgermeister.

After the 1849 Palatine Uprising, many people from the town emigrated to the United States. In connection with the 1832 Hambach Festival and the later Palatine Uprising, there is a story: On the republican-liberal citizenry’s side was the 23-year-old tanner’s son Jakob Krieger, who fled to the United States, where he founded a trade and banking company in Louisville. His daughter Amy married the Wolfstein banker Karl Otto Braun. On the other side was the State Procurator General at the court of appeal in Zweibrücken, Wolfstein-born Ludwig Schmitt, Heidelberger Romantik painter Georg Philipp Schmitt’s brother, and also Jakob Krieger’s cousin. Schmitt led the prosecution of the trials against the insurrectionists.

In 1852, the cantons were changed into district municipalities (Distriktgemeinden). On the district councils – 30 municipalities belonged to the Wolfstein district (Distrikt Wolfstein) – farmers held the majority, as the voting rather favoured those who were most heavily taxed. Of the 43 councillors in the Wolfstein district, 35 were farmers.

Monarchy came to an end in Bavaria with the last Bavarian king’s abdication in 1918 (he had reigned since 1913), after the First World War, in which 35 soldiers from Wolfstein and 19 from Roßbach fell.

===== Weimar Republic and Third Reich (1919-1945) =====
At the elections for the Weimar National Assembly and the Bavarian Landtag, the Social Democrats (SPD) earned roughly 34% of the vote in Wolfstein, about the same as the German Democratic Party (DDP), while the German People's Party (DVP) earned about 23% and the Bavarian People's Party (BVP) about 9% of the votes cast. By the time of the Reichstag elections in 1924, though, the SPD’s share of the vote had sunk to 9%, while the Nationale Rechte earned 34%, the Communists (KPD) 4%, the Völkischer Block 30%, the BVP 12% and the Freiwirtschaftsbund 11%. The 1930 Reichstag elections brought the “Hitler Movement” (NSDAP) 54% in Wolfstein (279 votes), the SPD 13% (68 votes), the Centre Party 4% (25 votes), the KPD 3% (18 votes), the DVP 4% (21 votes), the Wirtschaftspartei 15% (78 votes) and splinter parties 6% (27 votes). At the first town council election after the Nazis seized power in Germany (21 April 1933), the NSDAP won 8 of the 10 seats, and in the same year, town council bestowed honorary citizenship upon President Paul von Hindenburg, Reichskanzler – he did not yet bear the title Führer – Adolf Hitler and Reichsstatthalter Franz Ritter von Epp; the same honour was awarded to the local poet Pauline König.

On the Roßbach municipal council, too, the Nazis won a majority. Public servants such as police officials, municipal officials, field and forest rangers and the chief of waterworks were replaced with men who were true to the National Socialist ideology. The Party and its many organizations more and more came to define the town’s economic and cultural life. Thus, in 1933, the local singing clubs were merged into the “Westmark” singers’ association, the chamber of commerce, which had been founded in 1899, was dissolved in 1934 “under approval of all present” and the local Jugendleite (secular coming-of-age ceremony) was held on Confirmation Day, causing 189 people to leave their religious community. The town, which 100 years earlier had been associated with the struggle for democracy, was now welcoming, with a majority among its population, Nazi dictatorship. Once the Nazis’ goals had become manifest, however, it was too late to turn back. Wolfstein was largely spared any material destruction in the Second World War; however, the human toll was quite heavy: on Wolfstein’s war memorial to the fallen, built in 1930 at Neu-Wolfstein castle, a further 100 names now had to be chiselled; over in Roßbach, the 1931 war memorial bore 44 new names after the war.

===== Since 1945 =====
Beginning in 1947, Wolfstein was part of the then newly founded state of Rhineland-Palatinate. On 7 June 1969, the until then self-administering municipality of Roßbach in der Pfalz was merged into the town of Wolfstein. Since 1971, the town has been the administrative seat of the Verbandsgemeinde of Wolfstein.

=== Population development ===
Living in Wolfstein about 1600, according to the townsmen’s register in the Stattbuch (“town book”), which was begun in 1599, were some 150 people in 36 households. In 1618, there were 50 families with some 200 persons, but this is estimated to have dropped to only 50 inhabitants by the time the Thirty Years' War (1618-1648) ended. The 1618 population level was once again reached in 1684. Thereafter, the population figures kept rising. No records of Roßbach's population from the 17th century are available. In 1885 – only “present” persons were counted, while soldiers and the wandering musicians for which the region was then famous were left out of the total – there were 471 inhabitants (95 houses, no rented dwellings, no multi-family houses with separated living areas; occupancy per dwelling 4.95 persons). In 1900, there were 577 inhabitants (Kuhbrücke 78, Immetshausen 55, Roßbach main centre 381, Stahlhausen 63). In 1905, after the Kuhbrücke had been transferred to Wolfstein, there were 489 inhabitants. In 1918 there were 466 in 100 dwellings. In 1925, there were 504 in 98 houses. In 1933, there were 483 and in 1939, 515 (263 male and 252 female). In 1969, just before amalgamation with Wolfstein, there were 541 inhabitants.

The following table shows population development over the centuries for Wolfstein, with some figures broken down by religious denomination:

Year	1787	1826	1850	1867	1900	1939	1969	1969	1975
Total	486	788	900	1,128	1,691	1,564	1,667	2,208	2,346
Catholic		95		130
Evangelical		693		997
Mennonite		–		1

The two separate figures for 1969 indicate numbers before and after Roßbach's amalgamation. The figures for Roßbach itself before amalgamation are as follows:

Year	1751	1787	1797	1826	1841	1885	1900
Total	186	222*	244	325	420	471	577
Catholic				129
Evangelical				196

*42 households

=== Town’s name ===
The name “Wolfstein” has appeared in many different spellings over the ages: Woluisstein (1275), Wolffestein (1387), Wolffstein (1438), Wolfsstein (1477), Wolfstein (1824). Also, in the local dialectal speech, the town is called Wolschde.

The name “Roßbach” has likewise undergone spelling changes: Ruosbach (1024), Roßbach or Ruspach (1544), Roßbach (1558). In the local dialectal speech, the village is called Roschbach.

The name “Reckweilerhof” has undergone some more pronounced changes: Regewilre (1200), Reckweiler (1509), Rögswiller or Röchswiller (1600), Reckweylerhof (1777/1778), Röckweilerhof (1917) and now Reckweilerhof, or in the local dialectal speech, Reckwillerhof.

== Religion ==
Before the Reformation, Wolfstein belonged to the parish of Zweikirchen, whereas Roßbach belonged to the parish of Tiefenbach. Only about the middle of the 15th century did Wolfstein get its own church in the town centre (on Wassergasse). This church, called St. Georg (“Saint George’s”), was the successor to the like-named chapel at Neu-Wolfstein Castle, where church services had been held until then.

As early as 1528, Tiefenbach became a Reformed parish with chapels of ease in Roßbach and Einöllen. After the rectory in Tiefenbach was destroyed, the parish seat was moved to Einöllen in 1670. In 1704, for the whole parish of Einöllen, a Lutheran parish came into being with its seat at Roßbach. Adding to the mixture after Duke Gustav Samuel Leopold's conversion (reigned 1718-1731) to Catholicism were a small number of Catholics, and thereafter, believers in the Reformed, Lutheran and Catholic faiths all lived in this town, not always without problems, although there was mutual tolerance. In 2012, the Catholics, who had until now been served by their own priest, were merged into the parish of Lauterecken.

Arising in Wolfstein about the middle of the 16th century, under the pledge-lords Schwickard von Sickingen's (1549-1562) and Georg Johannes I's (Palatinate-Veldenz, 1543-1592) influence, were a Reformed community and a Lutheran one alongside each other. The former belonged (along with Kreimbach, Rothselberg and Rutsweiler) to the parish of Zweikirchen with the chapel of ease on Wassergasse while the latter, to avoid disputes with the former, established its own chapel in Wolfstein. The clergyman's seat changed between Wolfstein, Roßbach and Eßweiler. This chapel was, on the occasion of the union of the Reformed and Lutheran faiths, sold in 1818, and the proceeds were used to build a rectory (Haus Adam, 1822).

After the ecclesiastical merger, the Protestant parish seat was moved from Zweikirchen to Wolfstein in 1823. Wolfstein thereby became the mother-church centre while Zweikirchen and Rutsweiler became branches. Roßbach belonged until 1844 to the parish of Einöllen, when it passed to Wolfstein. Between 1866 and 1868, the Evangelical church, which still stands now, was built. Today, the Protestant parish of Wolfstein comprises the mother-church centre of Wolfstein along with the Reckweilerhof and the branches of Rutsweiler an der Lauter with Selbachmühle and Oberweiler-Tiefenbach.

From the late 17th century, the Catholic parish of Wolfstein grew into a broad, scattered community taking in the villages of Rutsweiler, Kreimbach, Kaulbach, Olsbrücken, Neumühle, Katzweiler, Hirschhorn, Obersulzbach, Untersulzbach, Tiefenbach, Oberweiler and Roßbach, with all together 381 souls. For church services, they used the old Saint George's Chapel at the castle, and from time to time, in simultaneum, the Reformed church on Wassergasse. In 1776 they acquired the newly built, stylistically pleasing Baroque church on Obergasse.

Today (2000), the Catholic parish comprises Kaulbach (with a chapel of ease), Kreimbach, Roßbach, Rutsweiler an der Lauter, Rothselberg, Eßweiler, Schneeweiderhof, Oberweiler im Tal, Aschbach, Reckweilerhof and Oberweiler-Tiefenbach, with all together roughly 900 souls, half of whom live in Wolfstein/Roßbach.

The denominational shares of the population in Wolfstein in 1802 were as follows: roughly 66% Reformed, 22% Lutheran, 12% Catholic. In 2000 the figures were as follows: roughly 20.9% Catholic, 65.2% Protestant, 13.9% other.

Towards the end of the 19th century, the Pfälzischer Verein für Innere Mission (“Palatine Association for Inner Mission”) established itself in Roßbach; since 1995 this has been the Evangelischer Gemeinschaftsverband e.V. (“Evangelical Community League”), which is now joined with the Evangelischer Gnadauer Gemeinschaftsverband e.V. (“Evangelical Gnadau Community League”) and is a member of the Diakonisches Werk of the Palatinate. As early as 1898, the members built themselves their own “clubhouse” with a meeting room and a dwelling for the (itinerant) preacher that the club hired and his family. Belonging to the broad missionary region are Bosenbach, Frankelbach, Hefersweiler, Hirschhorn (with its own mission hall), Lauterecken, Morbach, Niederkirchen, Olsbrücken, Reipoltskirchen, Relsberg, Seelen and Wörsbach.

== Politics ==
=== Town council ===
The council is made up of 16 council members, who were elected by proportional representation at the municipal election held on 7 June 2009, and the honorary mayor as chairman.

The municipal election held on 7 June 2009 yielded the following results:

Year	SPD	CDU	FDP	FWG	Total
2009	4	3	3	6	16 seats
2004	4	5	2	5	16 seats

“FWG” is a voters’ group.

=== Mayor ===
Wolfstein's mayor is Herwart Dilly, and his deputies are Paul Schmelzer, Gerhard Spaugschuss and Christian Nickel.

=== Coat of arms ===
The German blazon reads: Im goldenen Schild ein rechtsgewendeter schwarzer rotbewehrter Wolf, der einen roten Forsthaken (Wolfsangel) in den Tatzen hält. Oben zwischen Kopf und Schwanz schweben 3 rote Rautensteine (2:1).

The town's arms might in English heraldic language be described thus: Or a wolf rampant sable armed and langued gules supporting a cramp of the last, between his head and tail three lozenges per chevron reversed of the last.

=== Town partnerships ===
Wolfstein fosters partnerships with the following places:

- Verdun-sur-le-Doubs, Saône-et-Loire (Burgundy), France since 2000

== Culture and sightseeing ==
=== Buildings ===
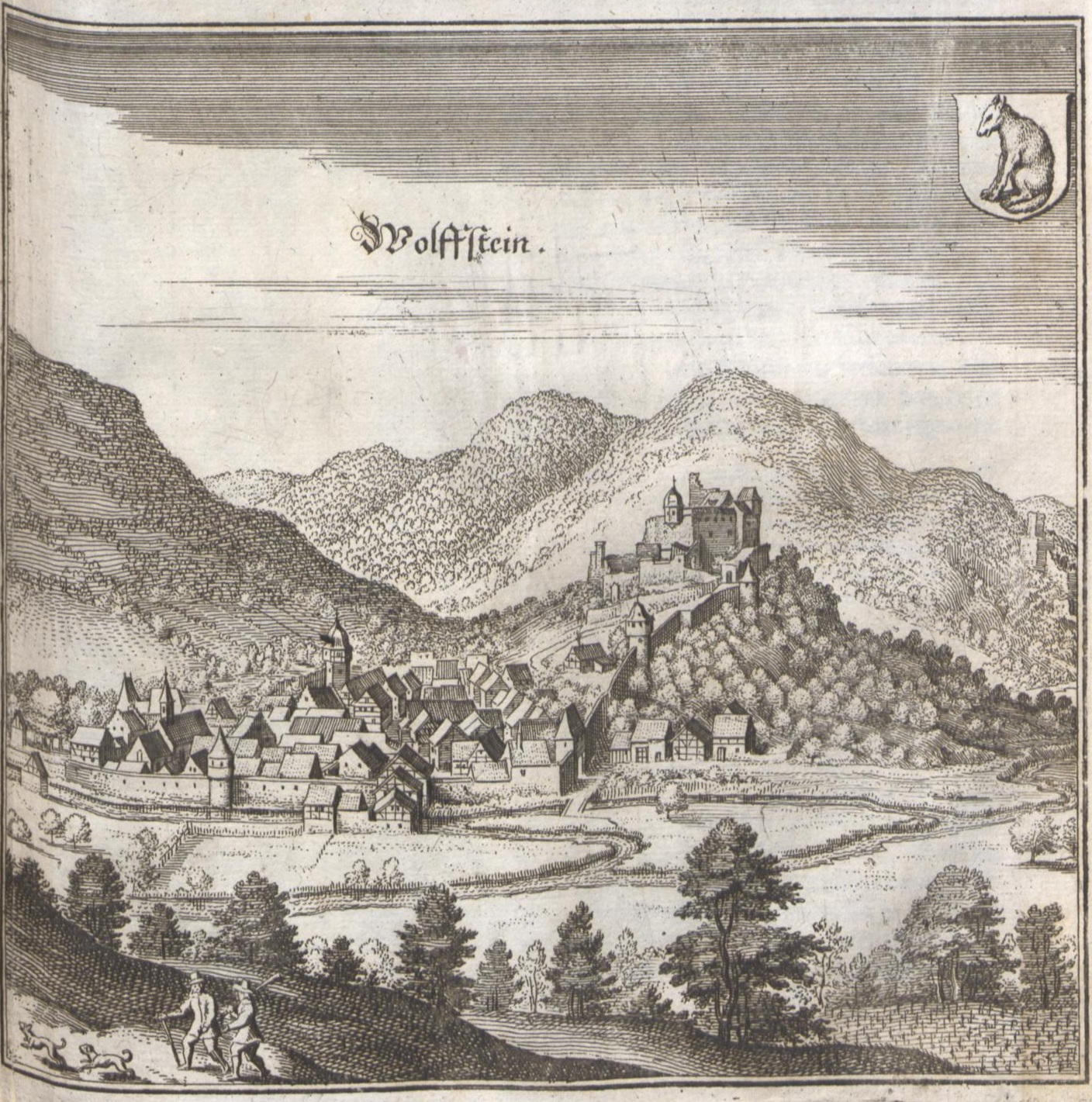
Wolfstein, from an engraving by Matthäus Merian in his Topographia Palatinatus Rheni et Vicinarum Regionum

The following are listed buildings or sites in Rhineland-Palatinate’s Directory of Cultural Monuments:

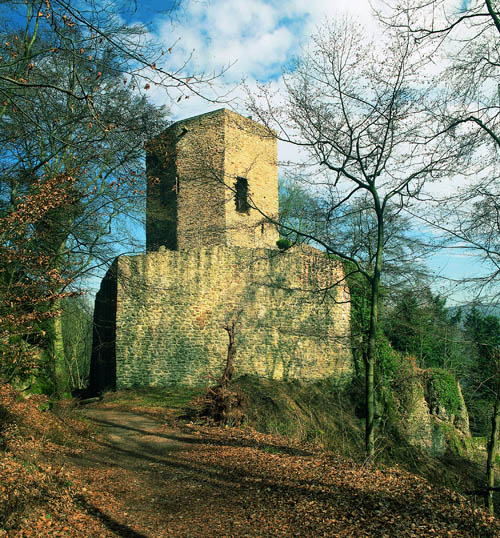
Alt-Wolfstein castle ruin (monumental zone)

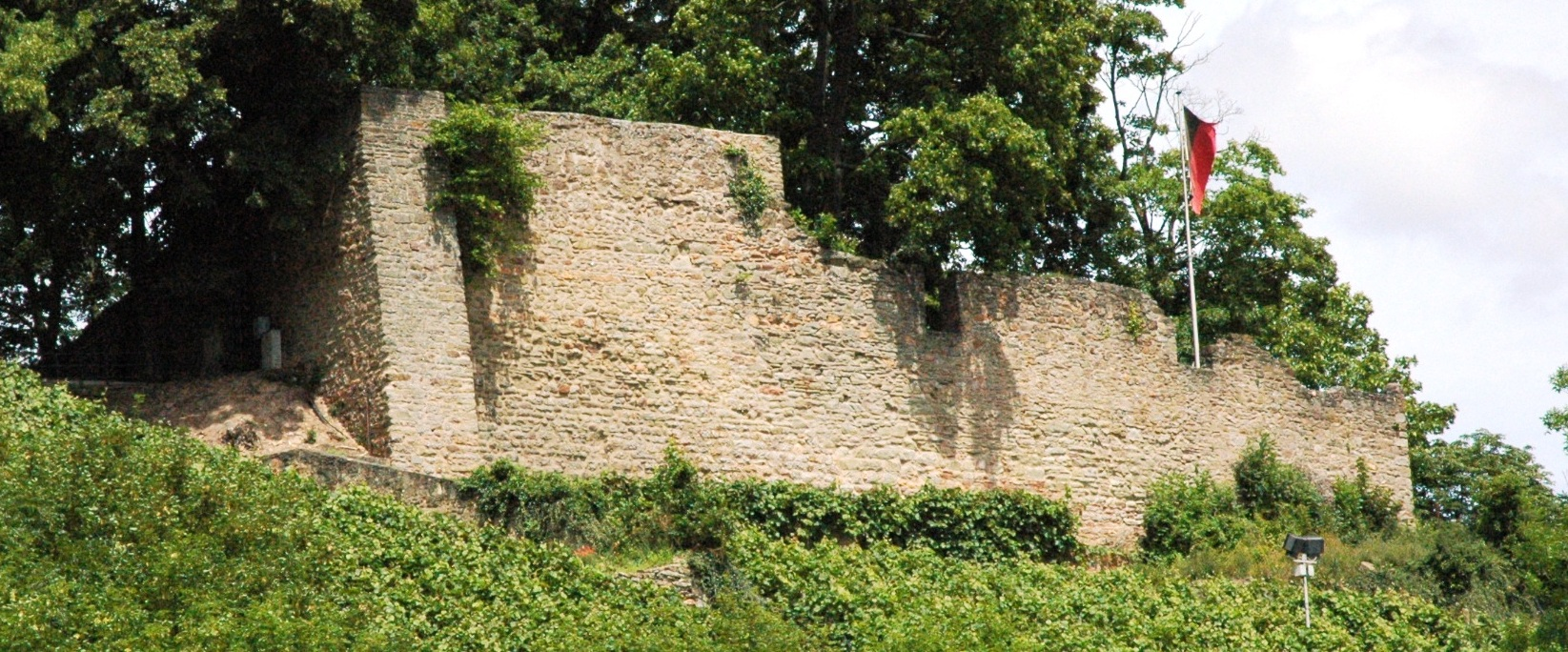
Neu-Wolfstein castle ruin (monumental zone)

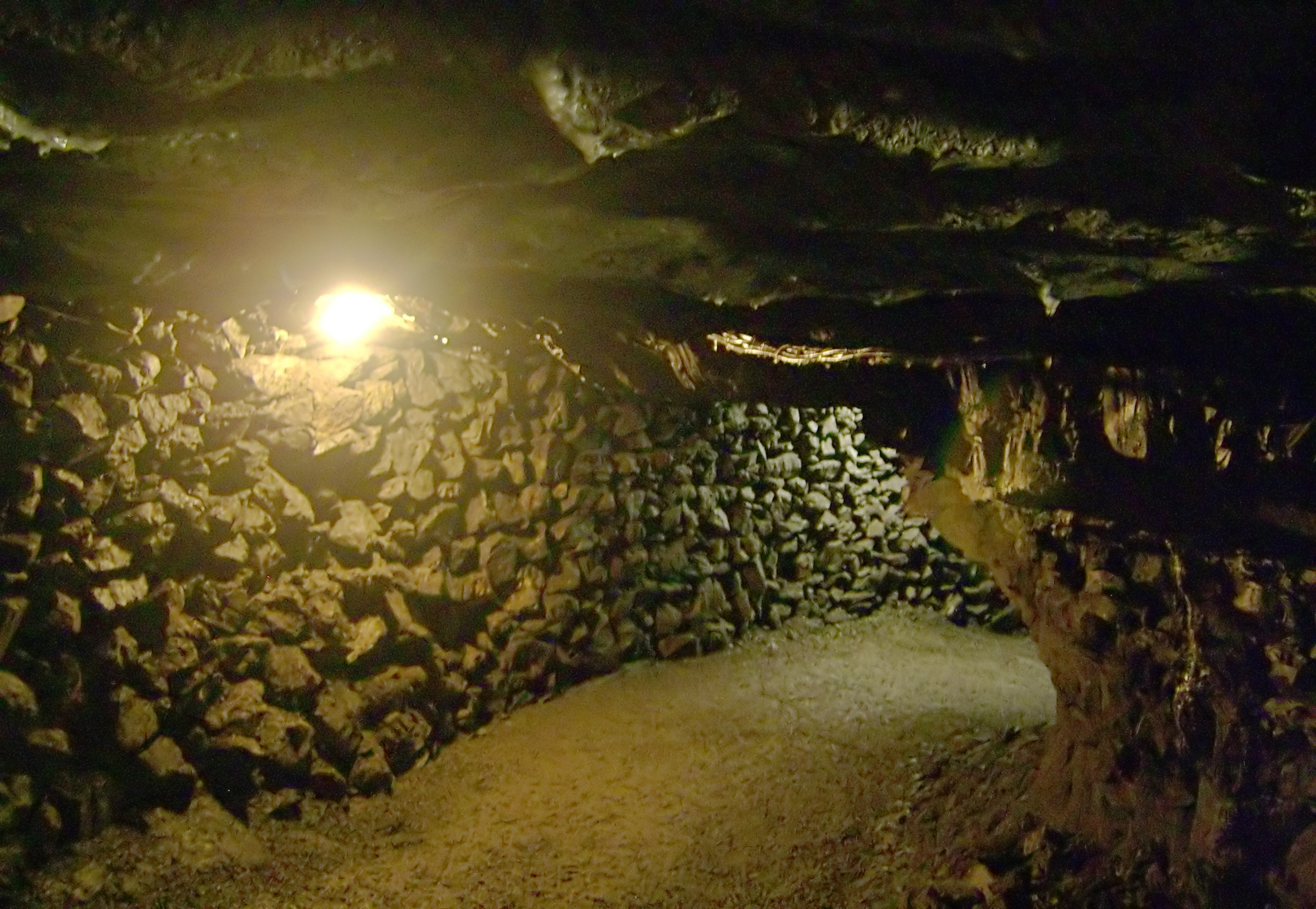
Wolfstein, Hauptstraße 48: chalk mine

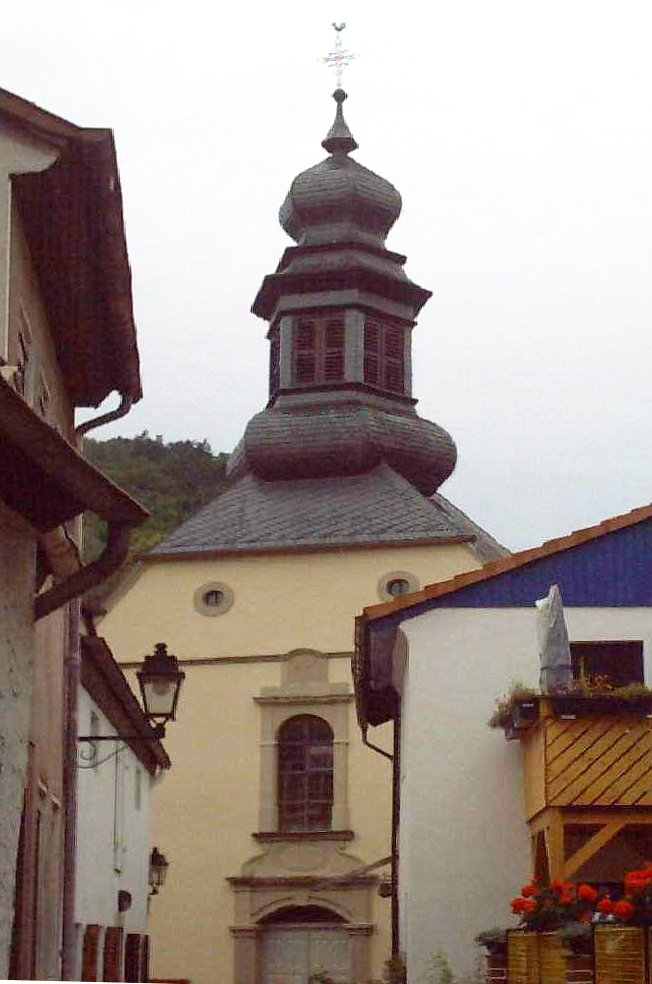
Schloßgasse 16: Saint Philip’s and Saint James’s Catholic Parish Church

==== Wolfstein (main centre) ====
- Saint Philip’s and Saint James’s Catholic Parish Church (Pfarrkirche St. Philippus und Jakobus), Schloßgasse 16 – aisleless church with half-hipped roof and onion tower, 1774–1776
- Town centre, Am Ring, Enggasse, Im Eck, Mühlgasse, Schlossgasse (monumental zone) – enclosed-construction area within the former town wall, of which bits at the millrace and behind the building at Im Eck 11 are preserved; built-up area mainly from the 19th century with individual timber-frame houses, which go back as far as the 16th century, former Lutheran chapel (Im Eck 3/5), former Protestant rectory (Am Ring 6), former Catholic rectory (Am Ring 10), former town mill (Am Ring 24), former dyer’s house (Am Ring 8)
- Protestant parish church, Am Ring 1 – Gothic Revival aisleless church, 1866–1868, architects Ferdinand Beyschlag, August von Voit, (1835), Emil Morgens, Kaiserslautern; Late Gothic Sacrament house
- Alt-Wolfstein castle ruin (monumental zone) – hill castle, possibly about 1160/1170 founded by Frederick I Barbarossa, destroyed in 1504; ward and outer castle, neck ditch, keep, partly shrouded, wall remnants of the dwelling building, remnants of a gate complex
- Alt-Wolfstein castle ruin (monumental zone) – outer walls of the spur complex, only outer walls preserved; begun between 1313 and 1323, destroyed in 1688 and 1713; warriors’ memorial 1930
- Am Horst, graveyard – graveyard hall at the graveyard dating from 1612; wooden construction with hipped roof, renovation 1876; two epitaphs, 1613 and 1735
- Am Ring 6a, Mühlgasse 1 – timber-frame house, partly solid, 17th century, in the back timber-frame workshop building; characterizes town's appearance
- Am Ring 11 – former town hall; middle building, partly timber-frame, 1581, three-floor front building with two timber-frame upper floors, 1590, walkway arcade closed in 1811; in the back dance hall, 1608 or 1689
- Am Ring 24 – Alte Stadtmühle (“Old Town Mill”); four-floor mill building, 1888, former bakehouse, commercial building; wedge-shaped, three-floor house, Swiss chalet style, 1909; characterizes street's appearance
- Near Am Ring 52 – hall of mirrors, Baroque Revival, 1903
- Bahnhofstraße 3 – bungalow, plastered building on stone-block pedestal, about 1903
- Bahnhofstraße 16 – railway station; hewn-stone-framed stone-block building, goods shed, 1882, dispatcher's signal box with original safety technology, 1938
- Hauptstraße 2 – former Amtskellerei (see above under Modern times); today the town hall, spacious Late Baroque building with half-hipped roof, 1753, architect Heinrich Heyler; vaulted cellar
- Hauptstraße 28/30 – former Amt court; hewn-stone-framed sandstone-block building, Renaissance Revival, 1900; belonging thereto no. 30 prison: three-floor stone-block building, hipped roof, 1901
- Hauptstraße 48 – chalk mine; underground chalk mine of the firm Otto Kappel, in operation from 1880 to 1967, since 1980 open to the public as an attraction (see also below)
- Rathausplatz 2 – former school; sophisticated plastered building on pedestal, gable risalto, 1890/1891, architect embanking and section engineer Weil, Bamberg

==== Reckweilerhof ====
- Reckweilerhof 9 and 11 – former Reckweilerhof estate; Quereinhaus (a combination residential and commercial house divided for these two purposes down the middle, perpendicularly to the street), marked 1752; dovecote, possibly from the late 18th century; armorial stone, marked 1602; silage shed, about 1930

==== Roßbach ====
- In Mühlhausen 2/4 – Rossbacher Mühle (mill); three-floor quarrystone building, 1871, on old core (1695); so-called Altes Haus (“Old House”): one-floor complex with single roof ridge, partly timber-frame
- Warriors’ memorial (monumental zone) – warriors’ memorial on the site of the earlier Saint Dionysius's Chapel (Dionysiuskapelle) and surrounding graveyard on the Dionysiusberg, stone architecture, 1931 by Karl Koch

=== Chalk mine ===
One witness to the town's industrial past is the Historische Besichtigungs-Kalkbergwerk (“Historic Visitable Chalk Mine”) in Wolfstein. A mine railway leads the visitor, with knowledgeable guidance, into the chalk mine at the Königsberg, where until 1967 chalk blocks were quarried underground and processed in town. All apparatus is still on hand in its original form. The chalk mine is held to be an industrial monument of special rank, and is unique in Germany.

=== Sport and leisure ===
Signposted paths open the Königsberg and its environs to the hiker. The Glan-Lautertal-Höhenweg, part of the Großer Westpfalzwanderweg (“Great West Palatinate Hiking Trail”) leads through the town's municipal area. Hiking destinations of particular note are the Laufhauser Weiher (pond), the Neu-Wolfstein and Alt-Wolfstein castle ruins, the Eisenknopf (peak) with its pavilion, the Zweikirche, the Heidenburg (“Heathen Castle”) on the Kreimberg, the Selberg (545 m above sea level) with its lookout tower and the gliderport near Eßweiler. Worth seeing in the town itself are the inn “Zur Alten Schenke”, which from 1590 to 1753 was the town hall, today's town hall, the former Amtskellerei, which was once an administrative centre, the Schlossplatz (“Castle Square”) with its Musikantenbrunnen, a fountain celebrating the local tradition of the Musikanten (see the Hinzweiler article – sections History and Famous people – for more about this), the remodelled Schlossgasse (“Castle Lane”) with its Eulenbrunnen (“Owl Fountain”) and the remodelling area around the Alte Mühle (“Old Mill”, on Mühlgasse).

The 112-kilometre-long Palatine Ridgeway (hiking trail) leads from Winnweiler by way of Rockenhausen to Wolfstein.

The Sport- und Freizeit-Center Königsland has games, sport and swimming with sporting grounds and a heated outdoor swimming pool. Other sporting facilities in Wolfstein are riding halls and other equestrian facilities (CJD), shooting facilities, tennis courts and a fistball court, among yet others.

=== Regular events ===
- Whitsun:
  - Open-air theatre performance
  - Fireworks
  - Maikur (forest hike on Whit Monday)
- Wolfsteiner Stadtfest, town festival before beginning of summer holidays, every other year, alternating with the next
- Feuerwehrfest (“Fire Brigade Festival”), every other year, alternating with the foregoing
- Herbstmarkt (“Autumn Festival”) in October
- Roßbacher Zeltkerwe (“tent fair”) in August
- Weihnachtsmarkt (“Christmas Market”), Saturday before the first day of Advent
- Reitertage (“Riders’ Days”) held by the CJD of national importance, last weekend in June

=== Clubs ===
Of the 26 clubs in town at the turn of the 20th century, those worthy of mention are:

- Musiker-Unterstützungsverein (“Musician Support Club”), for musicians who were ill or otherwise unable to work
- Johannis-Verein, for people unable to work
- Kriegerverein (“Warriors’ Club”), for supporting sick veterans and their families
- Liberaler Verein (“Liberal Club”), for the promotion of national and liberal politics
- Deutscher Flottenverein (Navy League)
- Radfahrerverein (cycling)
- Ziegenzuchtverein (goat breeding)

Today there are 25 clubs in town, the oldest of which is the Männergesangsverein 1858 e.V., a men's singing club. Roßbach's oldest club is the gymnastic club (Turnverein), founded in 1924.

== Economy and infrastructure ==
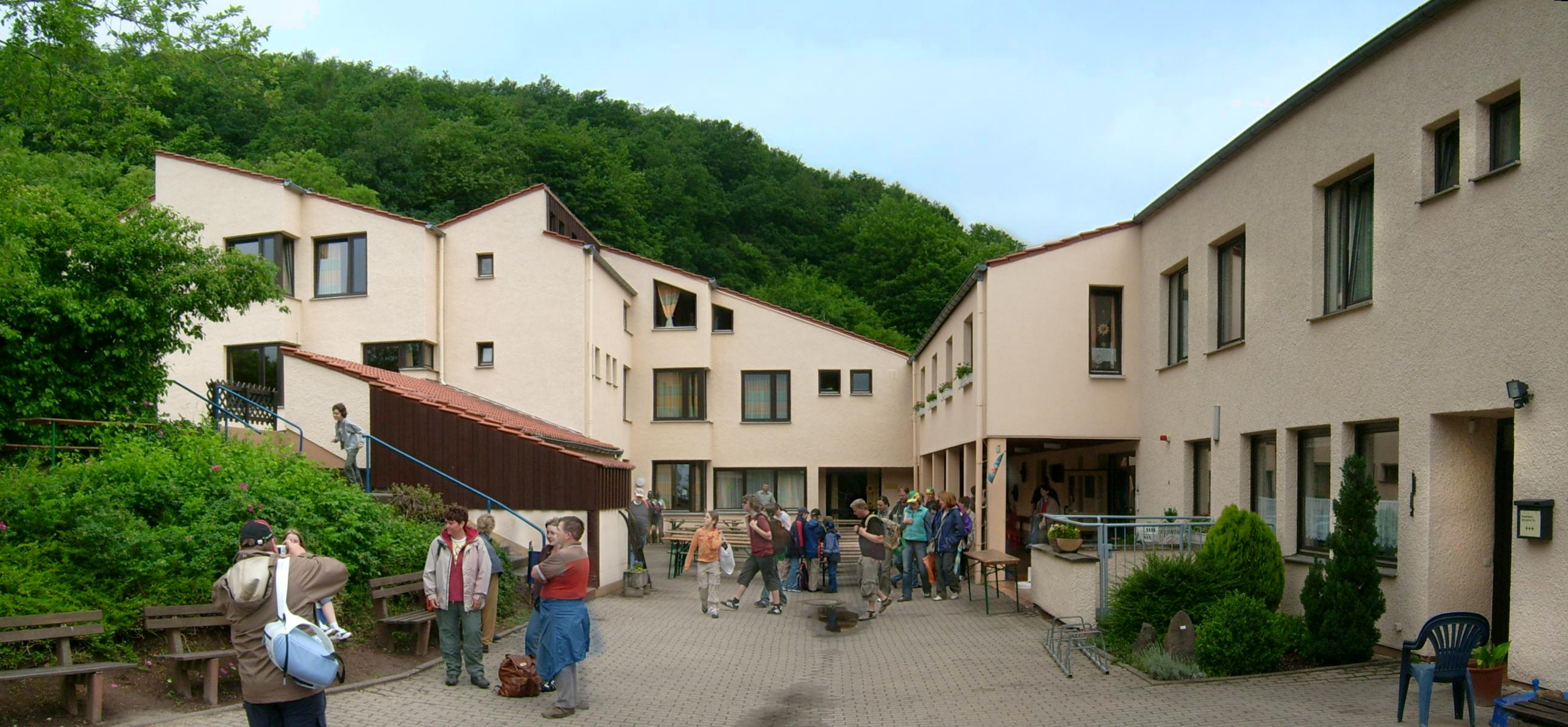
Youth hostel, built in 1978-1980

=== Economic structure ===
In Electoral Palatinate times, handicrafts and smallhold agriculture defined the town's economic structure. The greater part of Wolfstein's inhabitants lived in poverty. In the late 18th century, improvement came with the mining of cinnabar-bearing stone that yielded quicksilver on the Princely-Electoral side of the Königsberg, a pursuit promoted by Prince-Elector Karl Theodor. Under the leadership brought by experienced professionals who had come to town, this mining reached its highest point between 1770 and 1790. Nevertheless, the mining lasted no longer than 30 years before coming to a complete end in the 19th century, with destitution and hardship as the upshot for the now jobless miners and their families.

While it was true that new ventures arose in the 19th century through Wolfstein citizens’ initiatives, such as chalk mining, coalmining, tanning, brewing, linen and cotton article manufacturing, bricks, and so on, these fell far short of employing everybody who sought a job. Thus, out of the need for a livelihood arose the Musikant business, not only in Wolfstein but also in many of the outlying villages. For a time, more than 750 professional musicians from the Canton of Wolfstein tried their luck “on the world’s roads”, in circus orchestras, on Siberian noblemen's estates, aboard pleasure boats and elsewhere. Within what is now the Verbandsgemeinde of Wolfstein, all together roughly 3,500 people were active as Musikanten.

In the early 20th century, the economic situation generally improved: for one thing, the Lauter Valley Railway (Lautertalbahn), which had been opened in 1883, made it possible for workers to commute to the nearby quarries or to jobs in Kaiserslautern, and for another, new commercial establishments in Wolfstein and across the river in Roßbach offered earning potential. These included the Pfälzische Schwerspatwerke Braun, Krieger u. Cie. (1902-1950; baryte works), the Pfälzische Bandagenfabrik Karl Otto Braun (1903; forerunner of Karl Otto Braun KG; bandages), the Zigarrenfabrik Felsenthal u. Co. (1910-late 1920s; cigars), the Industriewerke Roßbach and the Kort brothers’ brush factory (1896-1923). Likewise of importance, as early as the 19th century, was the family Martin's pottery business.

Currently, the greater part of Wolfstein's inhabitants work in the secondary sector of the economy (all figures are rounded): 1,200 persons, or 67% of the workforce, of whom 1,030 employees and 60 trainees are at KOB KG alone, Europe’s biggest bandage factory, which recently gave up part of its independence to coöperate with the biggest distributor of bandage material, Paul Hartmann AG. Only 240 employees actually live in Wolfstein. Most of the commuters who come to town come from places around the Königsberg, which speaks to the factory’s importance to the “Königsland” region's economic situation.

Working in the tertiary sector of the economy are 600 persons, of whom 330 persons, or 19% of the workforce, are in “not-for-profit organizations” (CJD, Verbandsgemeinde and town administration, ecclesiastical institutions, schools), 80 persons, or 4%, are in trade, credit business or transport and 180 persons, or 10%, are in other fields (senior citizens’ homes, hospitality, healthcare, etc.).

The share of workers in agriculture and forestry in the agrarian community of Roßbach in 1949 was still 46%. There were 84 operations, 28 of them full-time, but with relatively small working areas (all under 20 ha) and widely scattered plots of land.

In the town itself, farming, somewhat limited by the steep slopes and the lean soils, always played a subordinate role. Now, however, even the outlying centre of Roßbach is purely residential, although some 90 ha of its cropland and meadowland is worked by the CJD. The last full-time farming operation within Wolfstein's limits is run by the family Sonn at the Reckweilerhof.

=== Education ===
==== Schools ====
Information about schools in Wolfstein and Roßbach up until the early 18th century is full of gaps. It is known, however, that given the town's denominational makeup, with Reformed, Lutheran and Catholic believers, there were three denominational schools, one for each denomination. After the unification of the Reformed and Lutheran churches, and as a result of the swelling population, the class at the Protestant school was for a while more than 100-strong, all of whom had to be schooled in the little one-room schoolhouse next to the Reformed church. In response, Wolfstein acquired a building before the town gates in 1823, and converted it into a schoolhouse with two classrooms, and also two dwellings, one for the Protestant teacher and the other for the Catholic teacher. Also attending Catholic classes were Catholic children from Kaulbach, Rutsweiler, Roßbach and Oberweiler-Tiefenbach. About the middle of the 19th century, a Protestant teaching assistant was hired who took over classed for the girls in the then existing six school age groups. For the Catholic children, a third classroom was set up in the loft.

After the introduction of the 7th school year in 1856, the number of pupils grew to more than 200, bringing about the founding of a three-class “simultaneous” municipal school at which pupils were divided into three groups, lower (1st and 2nd year), middle (3rd and 4th year) and upper (5th to 7th year), and thereafter, Wolfstein's Catholic and Protestant schoolchildren learnt their lessons together. In 1892, a new schoolhouse with four classrooms next to the Protestant church was dedicated. In 1928, the eighth school year was introduced. Until the same was introduced over in Roßbach (once the new schoolhouse there had been opened), eighth-year pupils from Roßbach had to attend classes in Wolfstein.

The Roßbachers built a schoolhouse in the village centre in 1825, and until 1871, both Catholic and Protestant schoolchildren attended classes there given by one teacher in one room. Once the school had been expanded that year with the addition of a second classroom and a second teacher's dwelling, the two denominations were separated, although given the unbalanced numbers, first-year Protestant schoolchildren were assigned to the Catholic school. The two denominational schools were converted into a two-class “German Christian Communal School” in 1933, which in 1937 moved to a new schoolhouse “Auf dem Mühlacker” (“At the Mill Field”), which for the time was quite modern and extensively equipped.

Beginning in the 1962/1963 school year, all seventh- and eighth-year pupils from Roßbach, Rutsweiler, Kreimbach, Kaulbach, Frankelbach and Oberweiler-Tiefenbach were taught in grade-level-differentiated classes in Wolfstein, which led to great difficulties in allocating room for everybody. This was solved in 1965 with the move to the Volksschulhaus, said to be the “moment of the birth of the Mittelpunktschule (“midpoint school”, a central school, designed to eliminate smaller outlying schools) on the Königsberg”. Brought together here, beginning in the 1990/1991 school year, were all fifth- to tenth-year classes from 14 villages in the Verbandsgemeinde feeder area.

Currently serving the town's needs are Grundschule Wolfstein (primary school; feeder area: Aschbach, Einöllen, Kreimbach-Kaulbach, Oberweiler-Tiefenbach, Relsberg, Rutsweiler, Wolfstein) and, since 1998, the Regionalschule and (with some classes being phased out) the Hauptschule (feeder area: the Verbandsgemeinde).

Wolfstein's old schoolhouse was for a time used by BASF, the chamber of commerce and the CJD. It is foreseen that it will become the town museum and library, while Roßbach's old schoolhouse has already become a village community centre.

==== Higher learning ====
The Christliches Jugenddorf Wolfstein (CJD; founded in 1972) is a member if the Diakonisches Werk der Pfalz (a Christian youth charity) and is one of the institutions of professional training and clinical social work of the Christliches Jugenddorfwerk Deutschlands (likewise abbreviated CJD). In their vocational preparation year, boys and girls aged 14 to 16 who have no Hauptschulabschluss are taken towards the professional training level. In the CJD's own workshops and external businesses, the CJD leads to a qualification in one of 15 different occupations in the industrial-technical, agricultural, gastronomical and sales fields. While in the Jugenddorf (“Youth Village”), a broad spectrum of tended lodgings is available to the youths. The administrative seat is the former town mill.

The Wolfstein branch location of the Kusel district folk high school offers courses for further training in data processing, applied data processing, foreign languages, fibre craft, cooking and many more.

=== Transport ===
==== Road ====
Running through Wolfstein is its main traffic artery, Bundesstraße 270, which leads from Pirmasens by way of Kaiserslautern (interchange with the Autobahn A 6 Saarbrücken–Mannheim) and Lauterecken (interchange with Bundesstraße 420) to Fischbach/Kirn (Nahe valley, interchange with Bundesstraße 41). The B 270 bypass road was opened to traffic after just under five years of construction on 17 November 2006.

The quickest road link to the district seat of Kusel goes by way of Rothselberg, Jettenbach and Altenglan (Landesstraße 370, 23.6 km). Running from the Reckweilerhof is Landesstraße 368 by way of Aschbach and other places in the heights and on into the Glan valley (Glanbrücken). From the Kuhbrücker Hübel, Landesstraße 384 (“Hefersweiler Straße”) opens the way to the places in the dales and in the heights around the Donnersberg.

==== Rail ====
Wolfstein also lies on the Lauter Valley Railway (Lautertalbahn), a single-tracked, 34-kilometre-long railway that links Wolfstein to Kaiserslautern Central Station and the Mannheim/Ludwigshafen – Saarbrücken long-distance services available there, as well as the local rail travel within the Palatinate. In the local town area, trains stop at Roßbach (Friedhof), Wolfstein (Bahnhof) and Reckweilerhof.

== Famous people ==
=== Sons and daughters of the town ===
- Friedrich Jakob Sander (1809–1876), musical instrument builder
- Franz Schmitt (1816–1891), painter
- Ernst Krieger (1867–1943), chess compositor
- Pauline König (1868–1938), Palatine “homeland poet”, honorary citizen of Wolfstein.
- Fritz Zolnhofer (1896–1965), painter
- Friedrich Jossé (1897–1994), painter and graphic artist
