= Rutsweiler an der Lauter =

- Municipality

- Coat of arms

- Location of Rutsweiler an der Lauter within Kusel district
- Interactive map of Rutsweiler an der Lauter
- Location within Germany Location within Rhineland-Palatinate
- Coordinates: 49°34′01″N 7°37′15″E
- Country: Germany
- State: Rhineland-Palatinate
- District: Kusel
- Municipal assoc.: Lauterecken-Wolfstein

Government
  - Mayor (2019–24): Dirk Landfried (SPD)

Area
  - Total: 4.32 km^{2} (1.67 sq mi)
- Elevation: 196–568 m (643–1,864 ft)

Population (2025-12-31)
  - Total: 370
  - Density: 86/km^{2} (220/sq mi)
- Time zone: UTC+01:00 (CET)
  - Summer (DST): UTC+02:00 (CEST)
- Postal codes: 67752
- Dialling codes: 06304
- Vehicle registration: KUS

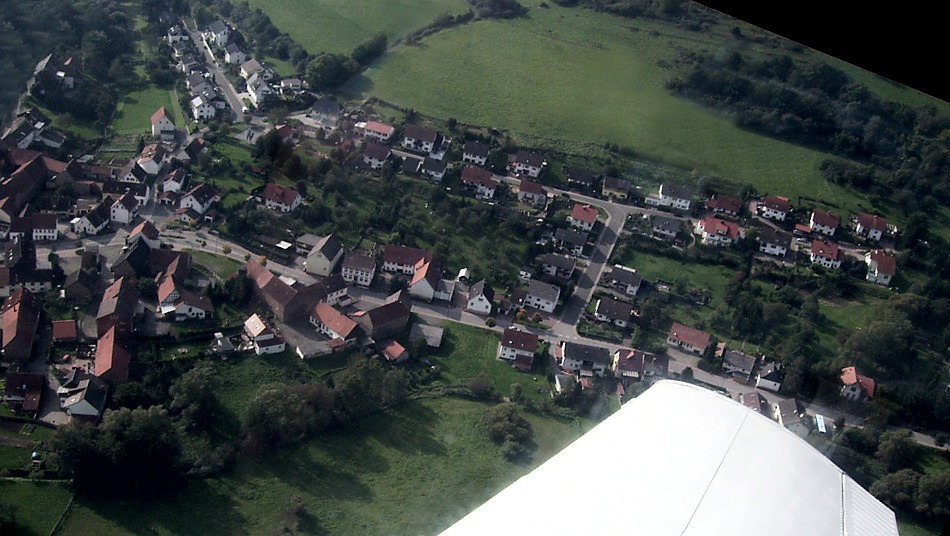
Aerial view

Rutsweiler an der Lauter is an Ortsgemeinde – a municipality belonging to a Verbandsgemeinde, a kind of collective municipality – in the Kusel district in Rhineland-Palatinate, Germany. It belongs to the Verbandsgemeinde Lauterecken-Wolfstein. Rutsweiler an der Lauter is one of two places in the Kusel district named Rutsweiler. The other is Rutsweiler am Glan, lying some 13 km to the west-southwest.

== Geography ==
=== Location ===
The municipality lies on the river Lauter's valley in the Western Palatinate. Rutsweiler an der Lauter lies north of Wolfstein at an elevation of some 200 m above sea level on the Lauter's left bank at the outlying hills of the Königsberg and Selberg. Even within municipal limits, the hillsides reach some 400 m above sea level. Flowing from the Selberg is the Kettenbach, which empties into the Lauter within the village. Lying across the Lauter on the right bank is Stahlhausen, and outlying centre of Wolfstein. Within Rutsweiler's limits stands the Zweikirche, one of the Western Palatinate's noteworthiest mediaeval village churches. The municipal area measures 432 ha, of which 95 ha is wooded and roughly 13 ha is settled.

=== Neighbouring municipalities ===
Rutsweiler an der Lauter borders in the north and east on the town of Wolfstein, in the south on the municipality of Kreimbach-Kaulbach and in the west on the municipalities of Rothselberg and Eßweiler. Rutsweiler an der Lauter also meets the municipality of Aschbach at a single point in the northwest.

=== Municipality’s layout ===
The village core lies in the area where the Kettenbach and Bundesstraße 270 cross each other. The build-up area spread out from this spot, mainly along the Bundesstraße. There are branches up the Kettenbach valley and also on a northern hillside. The Zweikirche stands north of the village west of the Bundesstraße near the municipal limit with Wolfstein. This church is surrounded by the graveyard.

== History ==
=== Antiquity ===
Archaeological finds in the neighbouring municipalities of Kreimbach-Kaulbach and Wolfstein, as well as parts of buildings unearthed inside and outside the Zweikirche, bear witness to human habitation in protohistoric and Roman times. Records mention a prehistoric barrow, but this is now no longer to be found. It is likely that the Zweikirche arose in the area of a Gallo-Roman villa rustica. As Isolde Schmidt wrote, “Pointing to a Roman building are not only unearthed foundation remnants but also countless Roman spolia in existing buildings, among them a Roman gravestone from the early 3rd century.”

=== Middle Ages ===
As a settlement with a name ending in —weiler, Rutsweiler is among the oldest places in the lower Lauter valley. In 1257, Rutsweiler had its first documentary mention; it arose sometime between 650 and 750. This holds true for the vanished village of Allweiler, too, which lay at the mouth of the Selbach where it empties into the Lauter, and which may have been slowly forsaken by its villagers soon after Wolfstein was founded in 1275. The settlement of Ober(n)hausen at the headwaters of the Selbach was abandoned in the late 16th century. The church known as the Zweikirche may at the earliest have been built in the 11th century, and the settlement at the church, Hof zu Zweynkirchen (the first two words mean “estate at”) was founded in 1372, after the Zweikirche was built. Rutsweiler to a great extent shares its territorial history with the neighbouring town of Wolfstein. The village originally lay in the free Imperial Domain around Kaiserslautern and beginning in the 14th century was pledged to various lordships one after the other. In 1350, the village was entrusted to the County of Veldenz and the Electorate of Trier, but before the 14th century was over it passed as an Imperial pledged holding to Electoral Palatinate before being pledged by that state in turn to the Lordship of Sickingen in the Late Middle Ages. Geographer Goswin Widder, writing in 1788, recorded that also in the Late Middle Ages, a knight, Sir Hans of Flörsheim, was enfeoffed with the village.

=== Modern times ===
Rutsweiler belonged to the Amt of Wolfstein (court of Rothselberg) and shared from 1312 on with the town and municipalities in the upper Lautertal the patchwork of permanent pledged landholds. Changing territorial rulers notwithstanding, the rights that the Offenbach Monastery had originally held to the Rutsweiler estate remained untouched. The monastery owner's fiefholders and lords protector over the ages were the Dukes of Palatinate-Zweibrücken and then, when in 1673 the Amt of Wolfstein passed to Electoral Palatinate, the Counts Palatine of the Rhine. During the Thirty Years' War (1618-1648), the village was destroyed, and many villagers were killed in the war, or died of the Plague. It is assumed that newcomers came to settle the village again after the war. The only Erbbestandsbriefe (“hereditary holding letters”, actually pledge agreements) issued by the geistliche Güterverwaltung (“spiritual administration of estates”) in Zweibrücken in the Dukes’ name that have been preserved, unfortunately, are the ones from the 18th century. They describe the lands belonging to the lordly estate, “gardens, meadows and cropland” and name the pledgeholders, who had to pay for their pledges at the monastery each year at Martinmas. To comply with the duties laid out in the agreements, they had to put up all their belongings as a surety. The plots of land of the roughly 30 ha estate lay scattered on the slopes that rose to the west, and that were safe from flooding. The monastery estate's hub was the Herren- und Hofhaus (“lord and estate house”), which in the early 18th century was held by the Hauptbeständer (“main holder”) Heinrich Klein, and it was furthermore presumably the farm later owned by the economic adviser Eugen Klein, which was torn down in 1985 to make way for the new village thoroughfare. About 1720, ten pledgeholders were working the estate; their surnames can still be found among today's villagers. Those in the uppermost sixth of society (Höchstbesteuerte) in those days were Nikolaus Woll, Martin Klein, Johannes Rosenberger and Heinrich Diehl. With the end of feudalism and lordly titles and privileges in the early 19th century, the lands found their way into private ownership. Rutsweiler remained with Electoral Palatinate until the end of the feudal lordship in the course of the French Revolution.

==== Recent times ====
During the time of French rule from 1801 to 1814, Rutsweiler an der Lauter belonged to the Mairie (“Mayoralty”) of Rothselberg, the Canton of Wolfstein, the Arrondissement of Kaiserslautern and the Department of Mont-Tonnerre (or Donnersberg in German) whose seat was at Mainz. After Napoleonic times and the Congress of Vienna, the whole of the Palatinate on the Rhine’s left bank passed to the Kingdom of Bavaria in 1816, and thereafter, Rutsweiler shared its territorial history with Wolfstein. It lay in the Bürgermeisterei (“Mayoralty”) of Rothselberg and the Canton of Wolfstein, but now in the Landkommissariat (later Bezirksamt and then Landkreis, or district) of Kusel. In the late 1920s and early 1930s, the Nazi Party (NSDAP) became very popular in Rothselberg. In the 1928 Reichstag elections, 17.8% of the local votes went to Adolf Hitler’s party, but by the 1930 Reichstag elections, this had grown to 60.6%. By the time of the 1933 Reichstag elections, after Hitler had already seized power, local support for the Nazis had swollen to 89.6%. Hitler’s success in these elections paved the way for his Enabling Act of 1933 (Ermächtigungsgesetz), thus starting the Third Reich in earnest. Until 1971, the village belonged to the Mayoralty of Kreimbach-Kaulbach. Local interests were handled by the mayor’s representative and first deputy (Erster Beigeordneter, or Adjunkt), who lived in the village. The mayoralty was dissolved in 1971 upon formation of the Verbandsgemeinde of Wolfstein, and since then, Rutsweiler an der Lauter has been a self-administering municipality.

==== Musikanten ====
Rutsweiler an der Lauter was a centre of the West Palatine Musikantentum (roughly "musicianhood"), a musical phenomenon that saw local musicians travelling and working all over Europe and the world. The Verbandsgemeinde of Wolfstein alone yielded 3,117 such musicians; Rutsweiler's contribution to this total was 115.

=== Population development ===
Before the Thirty Years' War (about 1600), Rutsweiler had roughly 100 inhabitants, and after the war (about 1650) only about 30. Only in the early 18th century was the population figure before the war once again reached. Rutsweiler an der Lauter, originally a village of farmers, has since grown into a residential community with opportunities to develop the tourism industry. As early as the 18th century, there were already opportunities – to work in the area's stone quarries and mines. In earlier years, the villagers’ voting patterns showed a marked conservative tendency, but nowadays there has been a rather sharp swing towards the SPD.

The following table shows population development since Napoleonic times for Rutsweiler an der Lauter, with some figures broken down by religious denomination:

Year	1802	1825	1835	1837	1872	1885	1905	1910	1939*	1946	1961	1971	1976	1986	2000
Total	174	237	237	237	306	325	318	321	708	324	298	297	307	331	389
Catholic		6									15
Evangelical		231									282
Other		–									1

*In the 1939 census, the workers in the two Nazi Reichsarbeitsdienst detachments, which had been established within Rutsweiler's limits in the dale by the boundary with Wolfstein in 1938, were included in the municipality's population. The permanent population was in fact 321. The two camps, which by the time were empty, were destroyed by American fighter-bombers in March 1945. The barracks were torn down after the Second World War.

=== Municipality’s name ===
The village's name, Rutsweiler, has the common German placename ending —weiler, which as a standalone word means “hamlet” (originally “homestead”), to which is prefixed a syllable Ruts—, believed to have arisen from a personal name, Rud, Ruod or Ruodzo, suggesting that the village arose from a homestead founded by an early settler named Ruod, thus “Ruod’s Homestead”. Other names that the village has borne over time are Rußwilre (1303), Rutzweiler (1335) and Ruzweiler (1788).

=== Vanished villages ===
In Goswin Widder's time, in 1788, the site of the Zweikirche (church) was still being described as a village in its own right, and next to the church stood other buildings. It can thus be assumed that throughout the Middle Ages, this church stood beside a small village that could have comprised only a rectory and one estate with stables and barns. The placename Zvenkirchen cropped up as early as 1250 in an original document. Also considered to be a vanished village in the Rutsweiler area is an earlier village called Allweiler, which may have been given up very early on. The generally accepted interpretation of the name Zweikirchen (modernized form) holds that originally, a church stood in Allweiler itself, while a second church stood out in the countryside as a hub for other villages. To be understood here is that zwei is German for “two”. Ernst Christmann interpreted the name Allweiler as Altweiler (alt means “old” in German), meaning that along with a new hamlet, there was also an old hamlet (this would be alter Weiler in modern, everyday German). Although the village itself is long gone, its name has been preserved as a rural cadastral toponym. Allweiler does not appear as a village in any mediaeval documents.

== Religion ==
From the time of the Reformation onwards, Lutheranism was the predominant faith in Rutsweiler an der Lauter, even after the Thirty Years' War when there was a general religious freedom. Today, 95% of the villagers are still Protestant. The Evangelical Zweikirche that stands outside the village has its beginnings in the 11th century, although it shows developmental features from later times up to Late Gothic. The elaborate paintings on the vaulting come from the late 15th century, but during the 20th century, they were not always restored properly.

== Politics ==
=== Municipal council ===
The council is made up of 8 council members, who were elected by majority vote at the municipal election held on 7 June 2009, and the honorary mayor as chairman.

=== Mayor ===
Rutsweiler's mayor is Dirk Landfried.

=== Coat of arms ===
The German blazon reads: In schwarz eine goldene gotische Kirche.

The municipality's arms might in English heraldic language be described thus: Sable a Gothic church Or.

Chosen for the arms were the tinctures once borne by Electoral Palatinate. Standing more specifically for the municipality itself is the one and only charge, the Zweikirche, as this church is called.

The arms have been borne since 28 May 1985, when they were approved by the now defunct Rheinhessen-Pfalz Regierungsbezirk administration in Neustadt an der Weinstraße.

== Culture and sightseeing ==
=== Buildings ===
The following are listed buildings or sites in Rhineland-Palatinate’s Directory of Cultural Monuments:

Hauptstraße 2: Zweikirche

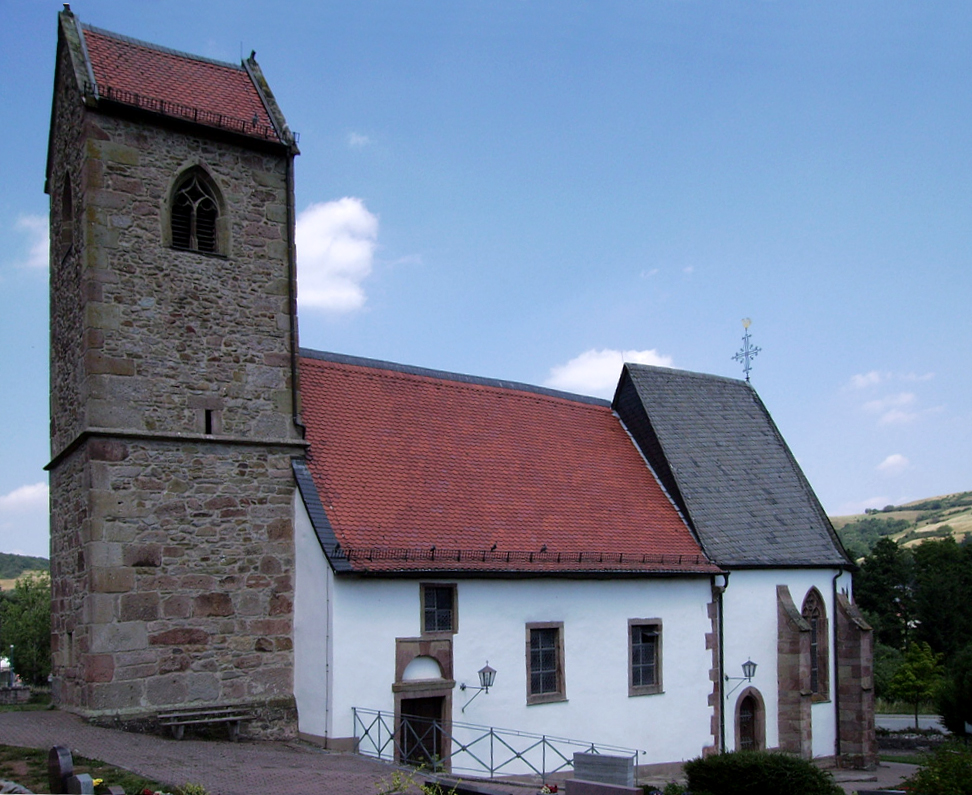
Hauptstraße 2: Zweikirche

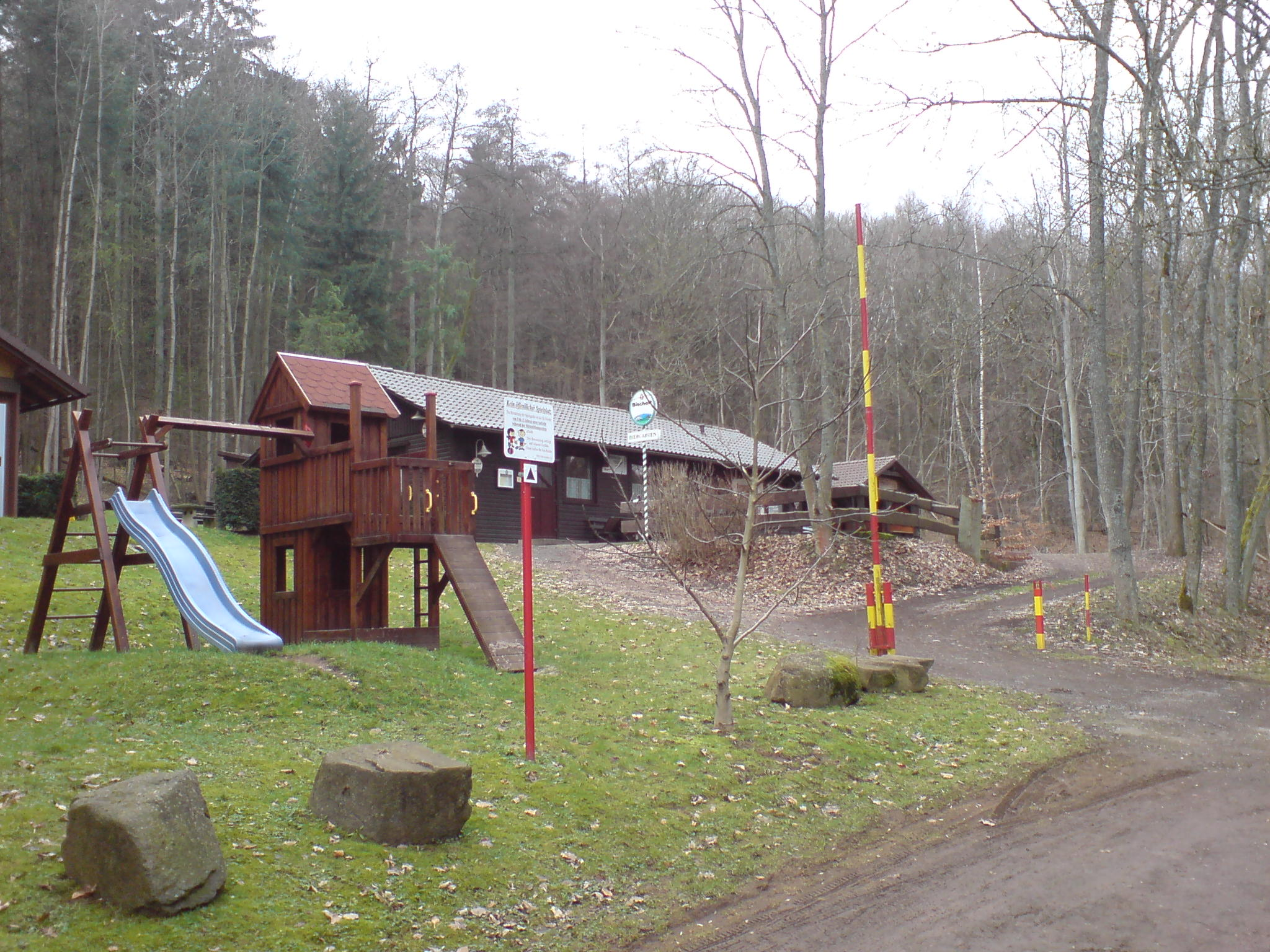
Pfälzerwald-Verein cabin at the Selberg

- Hauptstraße 2 – so-called Zweikirche; Romanesque nave, 11th century, expansion about 1320, Late Gothic west tower, about 1465, and quire, 1501; two bells, 1463 and 1464 by Johannes Otto, Kaiserslautern

=== Regular events ===
- Kermis (church consecration festival, locally known as the Kerwe): second weekend in October
- Village festival: first weekend in August
- Hüttenfest: third Sunday in August

Other customs resemble what is usual elsewhere in the area.

=== Clubs ===
Rutsweiler an der Lauter has the following clubs:

- Church choir (mixed)
- Blau-Weiss Rutsweiler (sport club)
- Landfrauenverein (“Countrywomen’s Club”)
- Pfälzerwald-Verein (hiking club)
- Carnival club
- “Lautertal” Pigeon club
- Nursing club
- Social Democratic Party of Germany local chapter

== Economy and infrastructure ==
=== Economic structure ===
Once so important, agriculture has nowadays been reduced to a minor factor in Rutsweiler an der Lauter's economic life. Today, the villagers work at the most varied of occupations and by and large, they must commute elsewhere to their jobs.

=== Education ===
Rutsweiler an der Lauter once had its own school, but today, primary school pupils and Hauptschule students attend their respective schools in Wolfstein.

=== Transport ===
Rutsweiler an der Lauter lies on Bundesstraße 270 and on the Lauterecken-Kaiserslautern railway line (the Lauter Valley Railway), although the station Stahlhausen-Rutsweiler, right at the village, closed in 1914. The nearest stop is now the railway station at nearby Roßbach, an outlying centre of Wolfstein. Trains run hourly.
