= Heinzenhausen =

- Municipality
- Coat of arms

- Location of Heinzenhausen within Kusel district
- Interactive map of Heinzenhausen
- Location within Germany Location within Rhineland-Palatinate
- Coordinates: 49°37′39″N 7°36′22″E
- Country: Germany
- State: Rhineland-Palatinate
- District: Kusel
- Municipal assoc.: Lauterecken-Wolfstein

Government
  - Mayor (2019–24): Frank Kohl

Area
  - Total: 2.21 km^{2} (0.85 sq mi)
- Elevation: 180 m (590 ft)

Population (2025-12-31)
  - Total: 242
  - Density: 110/km^{2} (284/sq mi)
- Time zone: UTC+01:00 (CET)
  - Summer (DST): UTC+02:00 (CEST)
- Postal codes: 67742
- Dialling codes: 06382
- Vehicle registration: KUS

Heinzenhausen on the Lauter is an Ortsgemeinde – a municipality belonging to a Verbandsgemeinde, a kind of collective municipality – in the Kusel district in Rhineland-Palatinate, Germany. It belongs to the Verbandsgemeinde of Lauterecken-Wolfstein.

== Geography ==
=== Location ===
The municipality lies in the North Palatine Uplands in the Lauter valley at an elevation of roughly 175 m above sea level, about halfway between the towns of Lauterecken and Wolfstein. The elevations either side of the dale reach up to 350 m above sea level (Schauerberg 328 m, Jungenwald 349 m). The municipal area measures 221 ha, of which roughly 15 ha is settled and 93 ha is wooded.

=== Neighbouring municipalities ===
Heinzenhausen borders in the east on the municipality of Hohenöllen, in the south on the town of Wolfstein and in the west and north on the municipality of Lohnweiler. Heinzenhausen also meets the municipality of Oberweiler-Tiefenbach at a single point in the southeast.

=== Municipality’s layout ===
The village of Heinzenhausen stretches along the dale, for the most part on the Lauter's right bank and is concentrated towards the north where a small brook empties into the river at the village core. Here, Bundesstraße 270 crosses the Lauter. The Lauter Valley Railway runs along the brook's left bank with a stop in the village's south end. The graveyard lies east of the village core.

== History ==
=== Antiquity ===
It is certain that the area around the village was settled in prehistoric times, and this is witnessed by comprehensive prehistoric archaeological finds, particularly from the municipal area of the neighbouring municipality of Lohnweiler. In Heinzenhausen itself, a stone hatchet made of volcanic material was found east of the village. Formerly, two barrows were also known, but today they can no longer be found. Roman finds are also known from neighbouring municipalities.

=== Middle Ages ===
It was likely in the Early Middle Ages that today's village of Heinzenhausen was founded, although it is impossible to pinpoint the founding date. The village lay in the Nahegau and then later passed to the County of Veldenz when this was founded in the earlier half of the 12th century. In 1282, King Rudolph I of Germany gave Count Heinrich III of Hohenecken and his wife Margarethe leave to sell the estate of Mittelrohrbach, a royal fief, with all its appurtenances and serfs to Otterberg Abbey. Against this sale, the king accepted from the comital couple the Lampertsmühle (a mill) and a meadow in Heinzemanneshusen sub Castro Wolvestein, that is to say, beneath the castle of Wolfstein. Besides the documents from the year of first documentary mention, the village's name appears in further documents from the earlier line of the Counts of Veldenz (1259-1444). Among them is a 1379 document according to which Count Friedrich II of Veldenz enfeoffed Johann Mohr von Sötern with holdings in Heinzenhausen. A year later, Gerhard von Alsenz acknowledged the receipt of interest from, among other villages, Heinzenhausen. In 1422, Count Friedrich III of Veldenz enfeoffed the brothers Johann and Philipp Boos von Waldeck with a series of villages, along with the estate of Wusthausen and his own holdings in Heinzenhausen. The Barons von Boos zu Waldeck owned an estate in Heinzenhausen until the end of feudal times when the German lands on the Rhine’s left bank were occupied by French Revolutionary troops. Count Friedrich III was the last from the Hohengeroldseck family to rule Veldenz - that male line died out with him in 1444, and the county passed to his son-in-law Stephen, Count Palatine of Simmern-Zweibrücken, a son of Rupert, King of Germany and widower of Frederick's daughter, Anna of Veldenz. Stephen, combining his lands, created the new County Palatine of Zweibrücken, which in the fullness of time came to be known as the Duchy of Palatinate-Zweibrücken. Stephen chose the town of Zweibrücken as comital residence. Heinzenhausen now belonged to this new County Palatine.

=== Modern times ===
In 1532, when a young Wolfgang, Count Palatine of Zweibrücken inherited his holdings, his uncle Rupert served as the child's regent. In 1543, when Wolfgang reached majority and took on the responsibility of office, he enacted the Marburg Contract, giving Rupert the County of Veldenz, including Heinzenhausen with it.

Like almost all villages in the Glan region, Heinzenhausen, too, suffered under the ravages of the 17th century's wars, both the Thirty Years' War and French King Louis XIV’s wars of conquest. However, during the Thirty Years' War, the nearby residence town of Lauterecken afforded the villagers shelter, and it was never overrun by the French. Nevertheless, death reaped a rich harvest even here with hunger and the Plague. The County met its end in 1694, when Leopold Louis, Count Palatine of Veldenz died with no heir. Now came a dispute over whether the county – and thereby Heinzenhausen with it – should pass to the Electorate of the Palatinate or be returned to the County Palatine of Zweibrücken, which at that time was ruled by Swedish King Charles XI. Charles took ownership of the Ämter of Veldenz and Lauterecken along with the Remigiusberg, but in 1697, the Electorate of the Palatinate dispatched troops, and quickly took the Amt of Lauterecken. A permanent solution to the dispute came only in 1733, in Palatinate's favour, with the so-called Treaty of Succession. Johann Goswin Widder, in his 1788 work Geographische Beschreibung der Kurpfalz (“Geographical Description of Electoral Palatinate”), wrote about Heinzenhausen, among other things: “Heinzenhausen, a slight little village of 15 houses on the Lauter’s right bank, lying half an hour up from Lauterecke, was called long ago Heinzemanneshusen … Nevertheless, the village seems to have been subject, with the Vogtei, at all times to the Counts of Veldenz and Castle Lauterecke.”

==== Recent times ====
During the time of the French Revolution and Napoleonic times, the German lands on the Rhine’s left bank were annexed by France. Along the Glan ran the boundary between the Departments of Mont-Tonnerre (or Donnersberg in German) and Sarre. Heinzenhausen now lay in the Department of Mont-Tonnerre/Donnersberg, the Arrondissement of Kaiserslautern, the Canton of Lauterecken and the Mairie (“Mayoralty”) of Lauterecken. In 1814, the French were driven out of the German lands on the Rhine's left bank, and after a brief transitional period, there was a new territorial arrangement, under which Heinzenhausen now lay in the bayerischer Rheinkreis (“Bavarian Rhine District”), later called the bayerische Rheinpfalz (“Bavarian Rhenish Palatinate”), but by any name, it was the territory on the Rhine that the Congress of Vienna had awarded to the Kingdom of Bavaria. Within this, Heinzenhausen lay in the Landkommissariat (later Bezirksamt, and later still Landkreis, or district) of Kusel, the Canton (later Distrikt until sometime about the First World War) of Lauterecken and the Bürgermeisterei (“Mayoralty”) of Lauterecken. In the late 1920s and early 1930s, the Nazi Party (NSDAP) was quite popular in Heinzenhausen. In the 1928 Reichstag elections, 29.1% of the local votes went to Adolf Hitler’s party, but by the 1930 Reichstag elections, this had grown to 40.2%. By the time of the 1933 Reichstag elections, after Hitler had already seized power, local support for the Nazis had swollen to 83.3%. Hitler’s success in these elections paved the way for his Enabling Act of 1933 (Ermächtigungsgesetz), thus starting the Third Reich in earnest. After the Second World War, the Bavarian exclave on the Rhine’s left bank was grouped into the then newly founded state of Rhineland-Palatinate. Heinzenhausen now lay in the Regierungsbezirk of Pfalz (“Palatinate”) within this state, and then later, after the Regierungsbezirke were reorganized, in the Regierungsbezirk of Rheinhessen-Pfalz. Regierungsbezirke have since been abolished in Rhineland-Palatinate and are therefore no longer a feature of the administrative structure. In the course of the 1968 administrative restructuring in Rhineland-Palatinate, Heinzenhausen was grouped as a self-administering Ortsgemeinde into the Verbandsgemeinde of Lauterecken with effect from 1 January 1972.

=== Population development ===
The village has remained rurally structured. Even today, the surrounding countryside is used for agriculture, though the number of farmers has shrunk. Thus, Heinzenhausen has become a small residential community with job opportunities in the area's major centres (Lauterecken, Wolfstein, Kaiserslautern).

The following table shows population development over the centuries for Heinzenhausen:

Year	1788	1815	1860	1871	1905	1939	1961	2001	2010
Total	~75	146	184	206	274	246	336	304	297

=== Municipality’s name ===
The village's name underwent several changes through the ages:

- 1279, 1282 – Heinzemanneshusen
- 1377, 1379 – Heintzenhusen
- 1380 – Heintzinhusen
- 1387 – Heintzenhausen, Heintzenhuißen
- 14th century – Heynzenhuße
- 1506 – Heynczenhusen
- 1588 – Heintzenhausen
- 1787, 1828, 1837 – Heinzenhausen

The pet form of the name Heimrich (later form: Heinrich) developed through Heino and Heini to Heinzemann (or, according to Dolch and Greule, perhaps through the form Heinz). The first name Heinzemann is a form that was particularly popular in the 13th and 14th centuries. Thus it may be possible to infer something about the roots of the name Heinzenhausen.

=== Vanished villages ===
Within Heinzenhausen's limits once lay the village of Wüsthausen, also called Wusthauserhof. It had its first documentary mention in 1422. The name still crops up in 18th-century documents.

== Religion ==
It is likely that Heinzenhausen originally belonged to the Church of Lohnweiler, and later the Church of Lauterecken. Wolfgang, Count Palatine of Zweibrücken, introduced the Reformation to Zweibrücken as early as 1537, and all the inhabitants had to convert to Lutheran teaching. Wolgang gave the Heinzenhausen area, as part of his gift of the County of Veldenz, to his uncle and former regent, the newly created Rupert, Count Palatine of Veldenz, in 1543. In 1648, at the end of the Thirty Years' War, it became possible to the subjects of Veldenz to convert to Calvinism, and indeed to Catholicism. Conversions to Catholicism and the coming of Catholic settlers became very common after 1733, after the village became an Electoral Palatinate holding. Of the 146 inhabitants in 1825, 76 were Evangelical and 70 were Catholic. In 1961, of the 336 inhabitants that were counted, 289 were Evangelical and only 45 were Catholic. This can be explained by the arrival of many Evangelical families during the 19th century. Jewish inhabitants do not show up in any available statistics at all.

== Politics ==
=== Municipal council ===
The council is made up of 6 council members, who were elected by majority vote at the municipal election held on 7 June 2009, and the honorary mayor as chairman.

=== Mayor ===
Heinzenhausen's mayor is Frank Kohl, and his deputies are Sonja Wolke and Henning Baldauf

=== Coat of arms ===
The municipality's arms might be described thus: Per fess wavy sable a demilion Or armed, langued and crowned gules and argent a waterwheel spoked of four azure surmounted by a bridge arched of two issuant from base set slightly to sinister of the field (?) masoned of the first.

The charge in the upper half of the escutcheon is the Palatine lion, a reference to the village's former allegiance to the Palatinate, while those below the wavy line of partition represent the bridge across the river Lauter and the mill on that river. The arms have been borne since 1986 when they were approved by the now defunct Rheinhessen-Pfalz Regierungsbezirk administration in Neustadt an der Weinstraße.

== Culture and sightseeing ==
=== Regular events ===
Heinzenhausen's kermis (church consecration festival) is held on the first weekend in August, and the Nachkirmes (“After-Kermis”) on the third weekend in September. Old customs such as were once observed in all villages in the Glan area are nowadays hardly practised at all.

=== Clubs ===
The following clubs are to be found in Heinzenhausen:

- Angelsportverein „Unteres Glantal“ — angling
- Förderverein der Freiwilligen Feuerwehr — fire brigade promotional association
- Heenzehauser Wicke-Wacke — “fun club”
- Landfrauenverein — countrywomen's club
- Männergesangverein — men's singing club
- SPD-Ortsverein — Social Democratic Party of Germany local chapter

== Economy and infrastructure ==
=== Economic structure ===
Besides agriculture, there were in earlier times the customary craft occupations in Heinzenhausen. At the Petersgrube colliery in the 19th century, 5 to 8 workers were employed, who between 1835 and 1855 mined 2 567 t of coal. The gristmill was up and running as early as the 18th century with both grinding and husking stones. It was shut down after the Second World War. Agricultural businesses are today quite rare. A prefabricated house firm in the village specializes in building timber-frame houses and energy-saving prefabricated houses. High-grade stainless steel furniture, mainly for the restaurant industry, is made by another firm. Other crafts of the traditional kinds are no longer customary. Also in the village are insurance agencies and a firm for distributing advertising articles.

=== Education ===
It is highly likely that as early as the 16th century, there were efforts to teach children to read and write, since the Counts Palatine of Zweibrücken had introduced the Reformation and were especially interested in putting the country's children in a position to read the Bible. School was held in an ordinary house. Today, Hauptschule and Gymnasium students go to the corresponding schools in Lauterecken.

=== Transport ===
Heinzenhausen lies on Bundesstraße 270, which links Idar-Oberstein with Kaiserslautern. Branching off Bundesstraße 270 is Landesstraße 383, which leads to the neighbouring village of Hohenöllen. Lauterecken lies 5 km away, while Kaiserslautern lies 27 km away and Kusel 35 km away. Serving the municipality is a railway station on the Lauter Valley Railway (Lautertalbahn, Lauterecken-Kaiserslautern).
