= Christliches Jugenddorfwerk Deutschlands =

German Christian nonprofit organization

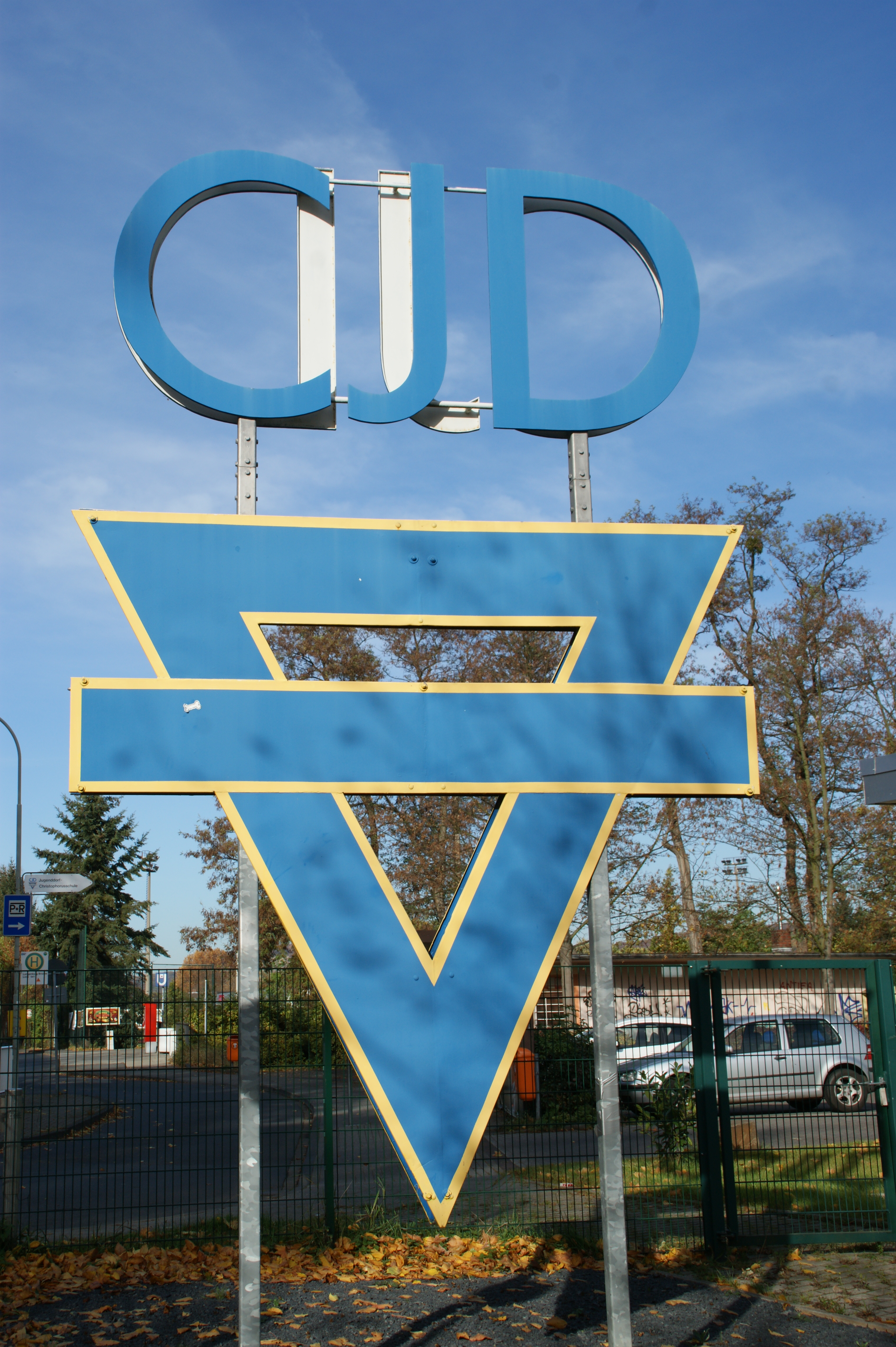
Logo sign outside CJD headquarters

CJD (Christliches Jugenddorfwerk Deutschlands) is a German Christian nonprofit organization. The organization was founded in 1947 by Protestant pastor Arnold Dannenmann. CJD is an organisation that deals with youth, education and social work. Over 155,000 young people and adults every year get the chance to benefit from expert training, professional development, and support for their specific life situations. CJD's "broad range" of education, training and development programs helps primarily young with learning difficulties, such as dyslexia, or behavioral problems. In addition, the organization assists former drug addicts, migrants, refugees, drop-outs, chronically ill, highly gifted, people with physical and mental disabilities, socially disadvantaged, young offenders and youth with a past experience of violence.
