= Lauter (Glan) =

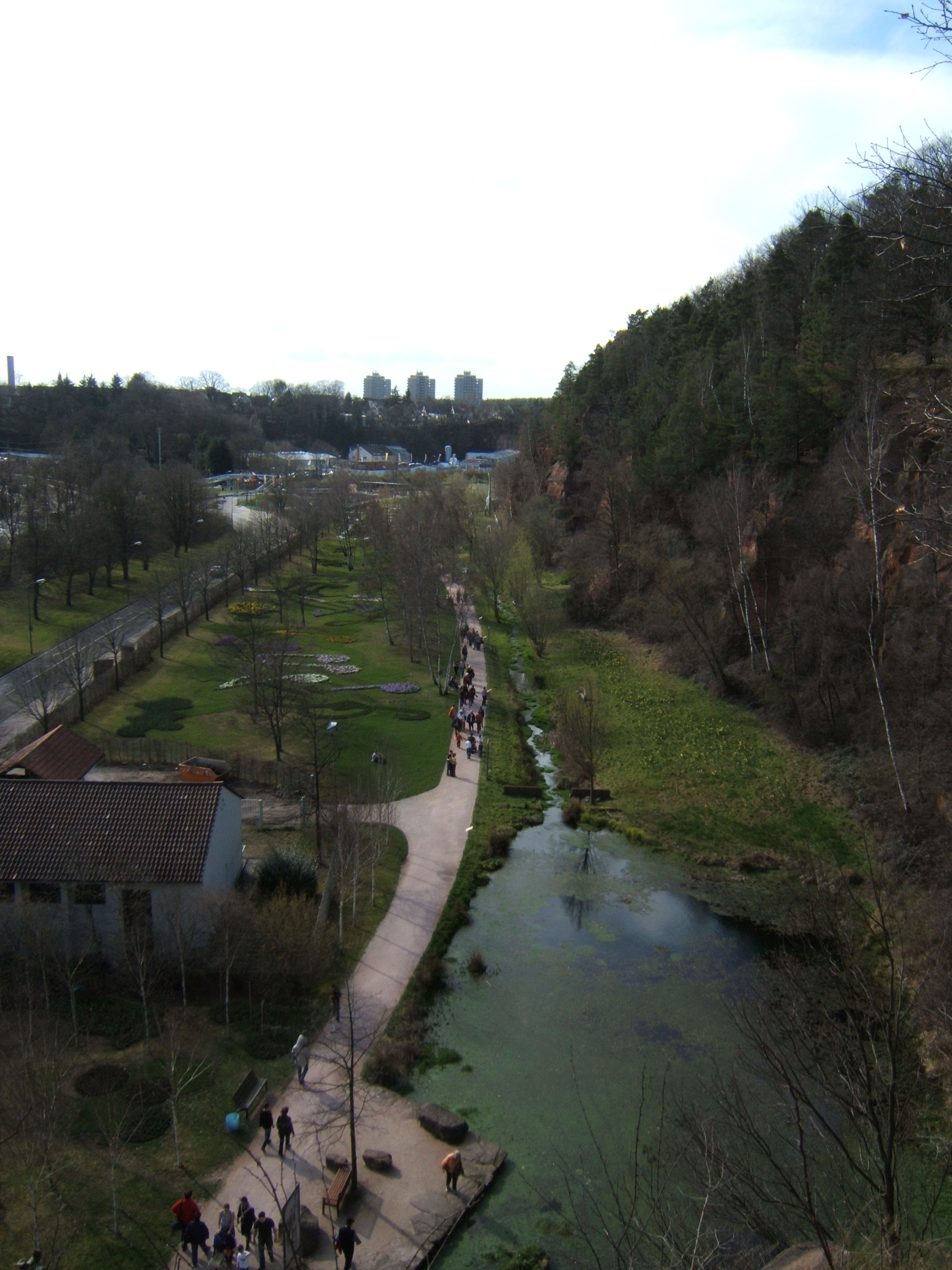
- A weir on the Lauter

Location
- Country: Germany
- State: Rhineland-Palatinate

Physical characteristics
- Mouth
  - location: Glan
  - coordinates: 49°39′02″N 7°35′27″E

Basin features
- Progression: Glan→ Nahe→ Rhine→ North Sea

The Lauter (German pronunciation: [ˈlaʊtɐ]) is a tributary to the Glan. The river flows about 33 kilometres (21 mi) north-northwest of Kaiserslautern, through Hirschhorn, Wolfstein and Lauterecken where it meets the Glan.
