= Ginsweiler =

- Municipality
- Coat of arms

- Location of Ginsweiler within Kusel district
- Interactive map of Ginsweiler
- Location within Germany Location within Rhineland-Palatinate
- Coordinates: 49°39′10″N 7°38′52″E
- Country: Germany
- State: Rhineland-Palatinate
- District: Kusel
- Municipal assoc.: Lauterecken-Wolfstein

Government
  - Mayor (2019–24): Roland Bender

Area
  - Total: 3.99 km^{2} (1.54 sq mi)
- Elevation: 180 m (590 ft)

Population (2025-12-31)
  - Total: 255
  - Density: 63.9/km^{2} (166/sq mi)
- Time zone: UTC+01:00 (CET)
  - Summer (DST): UTC+02:00 (CEST)
- Postal codes: 67742
- Dialling codes: 06364
- Vehicle registration: KUS
- Website: www.ginsweiler.de

Ginsweiler is an Ortsgemeinde – a municipality belonging to a Verbandsgemeinde, a kind of collective municipality – in the Kusel district in Rhineland-Palatinate, Germany. It belongs to the Verbandsgemeinde Lauterecken-Wolfstein.

== Geography ==
=== Location ===
The municipality lies in the North Palatine Uplands in the Odenbach valley, which runs between the Lauter and Alsenz valleys. The greater part of the village lies on the Odenbach's right bank at an elevation of some 180 m above sea level. Here, the Becherbach, which rises east of the village near the neighbouring village of Becherbach, meets the Odenbach. The elevations either side of the valley within Ginsweiler's limits reach up to 340 m above sea level on the right bank and 350 m above sea level on the left. Many people call the region the Alte Welt (“Old World”). The municipal area measures 399 ha, of which 38 ha is settled and 57 ha is wooded.

=== Neighbouring municipalities ===
Ginsweiler borders in the north on the municipality of Adenbach, in the east on the municipality of Becherbach, in the south on the municipality of Reipoltskirchen, in the southwest on the municipality of Hohenöllen and in the west on the municipality of Cronenberg.

=== Constituent communities ===
Also belonging to Ginsweiler are the outlying homesteads of Naumburgerhof and Ölmühle.

=== Municipality’s layout ===
The old village core lies in the valley of the Becherbach just upstream from where it empties into the Odenbach. The original village was expanded along the through road in the Odenbach valley. There are still quite a few old farmhouses here. The mill in the village's north end, the oilmill in the southwest and the Naumburgerhof in the west are also part of the older building areas. A new building area, Nachtweide, arose in 1990 south of the Becherbach. The former schoolhouse, in which an ecumenical church service room has now been set up, stands on Hauptstraße (“Main Street”). A sporting ground with a football pitch lies in the village's northern area between the through road and the Odenbach. The graveyard is found in the east on the road to Becherbach.

== History ==
=== Antiquity ===
Until 27 BC, the area was inhabited by the Treveri, a people of mixed Celtic and Germanic stock, from whom the Latin name for the city of Trier, Augusta Treverorum, is also derived. Thereafter, until AD 451, the area was part of the Roman Empire’s province of Germania Superior. Then, between 375 and 496, the Alamanni thrust their way into the lands on the Rhine’s left bank. However, they were dislodged from their new lands by another Germanic people, the Franks, in 496, who took over the area.

Within Ginsweiler’s own municipal area, no prehistoric archaeological finds are thus far known, but as witnessed by those unearthed in neighbouring places, human beings were already living in the area in prehistoric times. That the immediate area was settled in Gallo-Roman times might be proved by a piece of spolia that is today part of a wall in a building at the Naumburgerhof. Moreover, unearthed in 1833, during building work on a house, were a Roman relief and two lions. These finds were described by the Odenbach pastor Philipp Wilbrand Jakob Müller as follows: “A 3¾-foot-tall tableau chiselled out of fine sandstone; showing three well worked, clad human figures, not hewn into the stone, but rather standing out in a statuelike way, the middle figure was missing its head, which was broken off at the torso. It must, given the clothing and the whole composition, be explained as a female person, a mother who carries and leads her children with devoted love. On her left arm sits a small child wrapped in a cloth folded over and over. The child’s head is likewise broken off at the torso. With the hand hanging down on the right side, the figure leads a lad briskly and ably walking behind. A male lion broken into two pieces, about half life size, lying, resting on his forelegs, holding a sheep’s head between them. A lioness, broken into two pieces of the same size and in the same position: the front side broken up and with the sheep’s head between the paws. Both animals seem to have stood facing each other at a gateway or portal.”

=== Middle Ages ===
About 600, the lordship of Medard was split from the royal holdings and donated to the Bishopric of Verdun. In 843 came the Treaty of Verdun, which divided the Frankish Realm into three states. Ginsweiler was grouped into the Kingdom of the East Franks. From roughly 750 to 1140, spanning both the eras, before and after Verdun, the local area belonged to the Nahegau Counts. Splitting away from them about 1127 was the County of Veldenz, under whose protection were mostly ecclesiastical lands, for instance lands held by the Bishopric of Verdun around Baumholder and Medard and the Remigiusland, a domain held by the Archbishopric of Reims. In 1327, the Counts of Veldenz also bought the lordship of Medard. Ginsweiler, too, lay within the new County of Veldenz and later, comital vassals were time and again enfeoffed with the whole village or part of it. The first indication that history has of this is a document from 1379, wherein the knight Sir Mohr of Sötern (nowadays a constituent community of Nohfelden) confirmed that he had been enfeoffed by the gracious Junker Friedrich, Count of Veldenz, with holdings in the villages of Heinzenhausen, Lohnweiler, Lauterecken, Medard, Roth, Schwanden (vanished village near Medard), Obersulzbach, Niedersulzbach, Ginsweiler, Mannweiler (vanished village), Adenbach and Odenbach, and in the outlying countryside around Meisenheim. For Ginsweiler, Mannweiler, Adenbach and the two Sulzbachs (nowadays Sulzbachtal), this was a first documentary mention. Nevertheless, Pöhlmann rather assumed that the Gundeswilre mentioned in the document referred to Gumbsweiler (nowadays a constituent community of Sankt Julian), not Ginsweiler. Before these holdings were once more granted as fiefs, according to Alfred Wendel, the Knights of Odenbach had supposedly been the fiefholders. “Junker Friedrich” was Count Friedrich II of the cadet line of the Counts of Veldenz. In a 1380 itemization, a knight named Gerhard von Alsenz likewise acknowledged an enfeoffment from Count Friedrich II, confirming that he held a share in Castle Odenbach, and also received interest from various villages, namely Ginsweiler, Mannweiler and Adenbach. The fiefs named herein later passed at some unknown point in time to the Lords of Allenbach (Ellenbach). The village of Ginsweiler belonged then to the Unteramt of Odenbach. In 1444, Frederick III, Count of Veldenz, the last from the Hohengeroldseck family to rule the county, died without a male heir; the county passed to his son-in-law Stephen, Count Palatine of Simmern-Zweibrücken, widower of Frederick's daughter, Anna of Veldenz. Stephen, combining his lands, created the new County Palatine of Zweibrücken, which in the fullness of time came to be known as the Duchy of Palatinate-Zweibrücken. For the time being, the town of Meisenheim remained the residence town, but it was moved to Zweibrücken in 1477.

Northeast of the Naumburger Hof (farm) near Ginsweiler once stood the mediaeval Naumburg, a castle that has now all but vanished.

=== Modern times ===
The Counts Palatine (Dukes) of Zweibrücken introduced the Reformation as early as 1537. In documents dealing with subsequent ecclesiastical visitations, citizens of Ginsweiler were mentioned. Before the end of the 16th century, the rights to Ginsweiler granted by the Counts Palatine passed from the Lords of Allenbach to the Lords of Kellenbach and to the Mauchenheims of Zweibrücken. All these rights passed in the late 17th century to the Lords of Fürstenwerther, the offspring from Frederick Louis, Count Palatine of Zweibrücken's morganatic marriage to a Meisenheim townswoman, to whom the Elector had transferred the village and castle of Odenbach. The 17th century was otherwise marked by war, namely the Thirty Years' War (1618-1648) and French King Louis XIV’s wars of conquest towards the end of the century. There was more hardship than simply war that the somewhat secluded villages faced; there were hunger and pervasive sickness as well. The worst emergencies for the Glan valley were to be noted beginning in 1635. People's morals broke down and became unimaginably brutal. The villages were largely depopulated and after the war virtually had to be repopulated. Indeed, even before the Thirty Years' War, Ginsweiler was a very small village with only six families, according to a count done at a 1609 ecclesiastical visitation. By 1656, only three families were living in the village, and there may already have been newcomers among them. Even municipal boundaries had largely been forgotten, leading to boundary disputes between villages. As Alfred Wendel wrote: “The farmers of Adenbach and Ginsweiler in 1701 drove (their livestock) before the established time, instead of at Michaelmas (29 September), as early as the Nativity of Mary (8 September), to the jointly used 'Nachtweide' (a pasture). Those from Odenbach and Roth complained to the Swedish administration.” The administration answered them by saying that everything should remain as it had been before. The reference to a “Swedish” administration here stems from the dynasty that then held Zweibrücken: from 1681 to 1718, the Kings of Sweden were concurrently the Counts Palatine (or Dukes) of Zweibrücken. Other than contribution lists, nothing is recorded about events in the village during Louis XIV's wars. Population figures rose very quickly, supported by new settlers. In the course of the 18th century, it was found that not everyone could be fed by the local harvest yields, and there began extensive emigration.

Over the ages until this time, the local rulers were as follows:

| Years | Ruler | Remarks |
| 1410-1459 | Count Palatine Stephen of Palatinate-Simmern | from 1410 coregent in the County of Veldenz |
| 1459-1489 | Duke Louis I of Palatinate-Zweibrücken | – |
| 1489-1514 | Duke Alexander of Palatinate-Zweibrücken | – |
| 1514-1532 | Duke Louis II of Palatinate-Zweibrücken | died 3 December 1532 |
| 1532-1544 | Count Palatine Rupert | Ludwig II's brother; Guardianship |
| 1544-1569 | Duke Wolfgang | – |
| 1569-1604 | Duke John I | – |
| 1604 | Elector Palatine Frederick IV | Guardianship |
| 1604-1635 | Duke John II | wife: Luisa Juliana of the Palatinate |
| 1635-1640 | Dowager Duchess Luisa Juliana | Guardianship government |
| 1640-1661 | Duke Frederick | – |
| 1661-1681 | Duke Frederick Louis | Landsberg line |
| 1681-1697 | (Louis XIV) | French province of the Saar |
| 1681-1692 | Christian II | Birkenfeld-Bischweiler line; held by Kingdom of Sweden |
| 1691-1697 | Charles XI | Kleeburg line; held by Kingdom of Sweden |
| 1697-1718 | Charles XII | held by Kingdom of Sweden |
| 1692-1697 | Charlotte Friedericke | Archprince Wilhelm Ludwig's widow |
| 1697-1707 | Count Gabriel Oxenstierna | died 25 February 1707 |
| 1707-1710 | Christian Nikolaus von Greyffencrantz | – |
| 1710-1718 | Count Henning von Strahlenheim | – |
| 1718 | Count Stanisław Poniatowski | 9 August to 11 December |
| 1718-1731 | Duke Gustaf Samuel Leopold | Kleeburg line; died 17 September 1731 |
| 1731-1733 | – | Sequestration by the Electorate of Mainz and Hesse-Darmstadt |
| 1733-1735 | Duke Christian III | Birkenfeld-Bischweiler line |
| 1735-1740 | Dowager Duchess Caroline | Guardianship government |
| 1740-1775 | Duke Christian IV | – |
| 1775-1795 | Duke Charles II Christian | Palatinate-Neuburg-Sulzbach line |
| 1795-1797 | Maximilian Joseph | later King of Bavaria; Wittelsbach line |

==== Recent times ====
During the time of the French Revolution and the Napoleonic era that followed, the German lands on the Rhine’s left bank were annexed by France, and all the old feudal boundaries were swept away. The Treaty of Campo Formio had mandated this cession. Until 1814, Ginsweiler was ruled by the French. After territorial reorganization, Ginsweiler lay in the Mairie (“Mayoralty”) of Odenbach, the Canton of Lauterecken, the Arrondissement of Kaiserslautern and the Department of Mont-Tonnerre (or Donnersberg in German). After the united Prussian, Russian and Austrian troops’ victories over Napoleon, Blücher was able to cross the Rhine on New Year's Night 1814, and the French withdrew from the lands on the Rhine's left bank. For the next two years after that, the area lay under military administration by these allies. The authority was the Imperial and Royal Austrian and Royal Bavarian State Administration Commission (Kaiserliche und königliche österreichische und königliche bairische Landesadministrationskommission), whose seat was in Kreuznach, and then later Worms. Ginsweiler passed on 1 May 1816 to the bayerischer Rheinkreis, or “Bavarian Rhine District”, the name given the Palatinate once the Congress of Vienna had awarded it to the Kingdom of Bavaria as an exclave. Ginsweiler then belonged to the Bürgermeisterei (“Mayoralty”) of Odenbach in the Canton of Lauterecken and the Landkommissariat of Kusel.

In 1871, the German Empire was founded, but the Kingdom of Bavaria still existed within this. It was not until after the First World War, after the German Revolution in 1918 that the territorial status changed. After the Kaiser had been overthrown and driven into exile, Bavaria became the Free State of Bavaria. This lasted throughout Weimar Republic times until early in the time of the Third Reich.

In the late 1920s and early 1930s, the Nazi Party (NSDAP) became quite popular in Ginsweiler. In the 1928 Reichstag elections, 10.1% of the local votes went to Adolf Hitler’s party. In the 1930 Reichstag elections, it was 32.6%. By the time of the 1933 Reichstag elections, after Hitler had already seized power, local support for the Nazis had swollen to 48.1%. Hitler’s success in these elections paved the way for his Enabling Act of 1933 (Ermächtigungsgesetz), thus starting the Third Reich in earnest. On 8 April 1934, Ginsweiler was grouped into the Gau of Saarpfalz, and later, on 11 March 1941, it was transferred to the Gau of Westmark, whose seat was in Saarbrücken.

On 19 March 1945, American tanks rolled into Odenbach. Then came the occupation, first by the Americans, and then by the French. On 10 May 1945, a provincial government was set up in Saarpfalz and Rhenish Hesse under French occupation, and on 31 July 1945, the Chief Government Presidium of Palatinate-Rhenish Hesse was established. Finally, on 18 May 1947, the state of Rhineland-Palatinate was founded. After the Second World War, when the Palatinate was split away from Bavaria, other territorial arrangements did not change at first. Only in the course of the 1968 administrative restructuring did Ginsweiler pass in 1970 to the then newly founded Verbandsgemeinde of Lauterecken. The Bürgermeisterei (“Mayoralty”) of Odenbach was also dissolved.

=== Population development ===
Ginsweiler has remained to this day rurally structured. The greater part of the population was working in agriculture even after the Second World War. Along with this, there were also craftsmen in the village. Farming nowadays employs very few people. Most members of the workforce must seek a livelihood elsewhere, and so the village must be regarded as a rural residential community. In the Late Middle Ages, Ginsweiler was very small, indeed at best a gathering of several farms right up until the Thirty Years' War broke out in the early 17th century. Furthermore, the number of farms was at least halved in that long-fought war. Great growth in population marked the 18th century, though, which can only be explained by newcomers settling in the village, which in the beginning was likely the result of French repopulation measures. The population also kept rising in the 19th and early 20th centuries, reaching a peak of 404 inhabitants in 1905. Between the two world wars, growth stagnated at a rather low level, but rose again after the Second World War with the coming of ethnic Germans driven out of Germany's former eastern territories, reaching an all-time peak of 441 inhabitants in 1950. After a rather hefty decrease about 1970, there were light waves of movement in and out of the village. Population aging does not show up as strongly in Ginsweiler as it does in other places of similar size in the Kusel district.

The following table shows population development over the centuries for Ginsweiler:

| Year | 1609 | 1656 | 1674 | 1719 | 1790 | 1801 | 1835 | 1905 | 1939 | 1945 | 1961 | 1980 | 1999 | 2010 |
| Total | 32 | 12 | 20 | 64 | 112 | 179 | 295 | 404 | 390 | 224 | 378 | 355 | 369 | 337 |

=== Municipality’s name ===
In 1379, Ginsweiler had its first documentary mention as Gundeßwilr. Later forms of the name are Gimswiler (1483), Gintzweiller (1557), Guntzwiller (1580), Ginssweiler (1724), Ginzweiler (1797) and Ginsweiler (1824). The village's name combines the common placename ending —weiler, meaning “hamlet” or, originally, “homestead”, with the personal name “Gundlîn”, and thus the name Ginsweiler originally meant “Gundlîn’s Homestead”. The —weiler ending also suggests a founding in early Frankish times.

=== Vanished villages ===
Actual abandoned villages in the area of Ginsweiler's limits are unknown. However, as early as 1380, in connection with Ginsweiler and other nearby villages, a place called Nunburg was being mentioned. This might be exactly the same place as what is now called the Naumburgerhof near Ginsweiler. It is assumed that this village or the later farming homestead (as it is now) arose at a castle, or perhaps a castle's former site (the ending —burg means “castle” in German). As early as 1268, a Niwenburg (“new castle”) was mentioned, perhaps the root of both names. Could the Naumburgerhof even once have been a Roman villa rustica? Even today, Roman spolia are to be found on the farm, leading to speculation that such an ancient estate may have lain just here. Names that the Naumburgerhof has borne over the centuries are: Hofguth Naumburg, (1585), Nauenberg (1609), Naumberg (1661), Hofguth Naumburg (1673), Naumburger Hof (1773).

== Religion ==
From the Early Middle Ages, Ginsweiler belonged to the Glan ecclesiastical chapter and was a branch congregation of the Church of Medard. After the Reformation was introduced into the County Palatine of Zweibrücken about 1537, all the village's inhabitants had to embrace Martin Luther’s teachings. Likewise in 1588, a decree from the Count Palatine meant that everyone then had to adopt John Calvin’s Reformed beliefs. Only after the Thirty Years' War ended in 1648 were the people once again allowed to adopt the Catholic or Lutheran faith. With the arrival of new settlers who had come to repopulate villages emptied of people by the Thirty Years' War, and with the promotion of Catholicism by the French during Louis XIV’s wars of conquest, the Catholic share of local villages’ populations began to rise. It can thus be assumed that during the French wars of conquest, Roman Catholics settled in Ginsweiler. Another thing that could explain the strong growth in the Catholic population at this time is missionary work being done by the Franciscan convent that had then set itself up in the town of Meisenheim. Few seized the opportunity to convert to Lutheranism, and anyway, the Lutheran and Calvinist churches eventually united in the 1818 Palatine Protestant Union. In 1719, there were 21 Roman Catholic Christians living in the village, 38 Reformed (Calvinists) and 5 Lutherans. Of the 225 inhabitants in the village in 1825, 122 were Catholic and 81 Evangelical. Among the Evangelical inhabitants during the 19th century, there were always Mennonites who were counted along with them (8 in 1802; 17 in 1867). In 1961, Protestants were once again the greater group (161 Roman Catholics; 215 Evangelicals). Ginsweiler has never had its own church. The Evangelical Christians now belong to the parish of Odenbach while the Roman Catholics originally belonged to the parish of Reipoltskirchen, but since 1975 have belonged to the parish of Lauterecken.

== Politics ==
=== Municipal council ===
The council is made up of 8 council members, who were elected by majority vote at the municipal election held on 7 June 2009, and the honorary mayor as chairman.

=== Mayor ===
Ginsweiler's mayor is Roland Bender.

=== Coat of arms ===
The German blazon reads: In gespaltenem Schild rechts zwölffach von Silber und Blau unterteilt, links in Schwarz ein goldener Ginsterzweig.

The municipality's arms might in English heraldic language be described thus: Per pale barry of twelve argent and azure and sable a broom twig slipped palewise Or.

The barry pattern on the dexter (armsbearer's right, viewer's left) side is drawn from the arms once borne by the Lords of Boxberg, who had holdings in Ginsweiler during the Middle Ages, and the tinctures come from those once borne by the Counts of Veldenz. The charge on the sinister (armsbearer's left, viewer's right) side, the broom twig, is canting for the village's name. “Broom” is Ginster in German. The twig and the field in this half of the arms are also rendered in Rhineland-Palatinate's tinctures.

The arms were designed by Mr. Becker from Malberg, were conferred by the old Regierungsbezirk of Rheinhessen-Pfalz (whose seat was in Neustadt an der Weinstraße) and have been borne since 13 December 1978.

== Culture and sightseeing ==
=== Buildings ===
The following are listed buildings or sites in Rhineland-Palatinate’s Directory of Cultural Monuments:

- Hauptstraße 35 – one-floor Quereinhaus (a combination residential and commercial house divided for these two purposes down the middle, perpendicularly to the street) with knee wall, marked 1830
- At Naumburger Hof 3a – spolia, block from a Roman tomb

=== Regular events ===
The kermis (church consecration festival) is held on the last weekend in June, while a Nachkerb (“Afterkermis”) was held until a few years ago on the last weekend in September. Now, though, a Christmas market has been introduced instead, held on the second Sunday in Advent. Other old customs have hardly been preserved.

=== Clubs ===
The following clubs are active in Ginsweiler:

- Sportverein-Cronenberg — sport club
- Ortsgruppe des VDK — VDK local chapter; advocates for the handicapped, chronically ill, seniors and war victims
- Landfrauenverein — countrywomen's club
- Feuerwehrförderverein — fire brigade promotional association
- SPD-Ortsverein — SPD local chapter
- Theatergruppe — theatre troop
- Vogelschutzgruppe — bird conservation group
- Mutter- und Kindergruppe — mother-and-child group
- Seniorenkreis — “seniors’ circle”
- DRK-Ortsgruppe — German Red Cross local chapter
- Bauern- und Winzerschaft — farmers’ and winegrowers’ association

== Economy and infrastructure ==
=== Economic structure ===
Originally, the villagers lived almost wholly on agriculture. Besides the customary craft businesses, there were in earlier days three mills. Two were named for their locations on the brook as Untermühle and Obermühle (“Lower Mill” and “Upper Mill”). The Lower Mill was mentioned as early as 1570, and it was running until 1979. The Upper Mill was foremost an oilmill. It was built in the mid 18th century and was shut down for good in 1954. For a shorter time, there was a Pulvermühle (“Powder Mill”), at which saltpetre was finely ground. This mill was built in the mid 17th century, but was shut down in the early 18th century. Further sources of income in the Ginsweiler area were the sandstone quarries, which were shut down after the Second World War owing to unprofitability. In the late 18th and early 19th centuries, travelling musicians (Wandermusikanten) from Ginsweiler travelled the world, as they did from many other villages in the region. In the late 19th century, a small circus business even had its head office in the village.

=== Education ===
Although the number of children was rising, the only school in Ginsweiler was the tiny 18th-century one used by the Protestant schoolchildren. The Catholic schoolchildren still had to attend the school in Reipoltskirchen, which had separate classrooms for each denomination. Only in 1864 was a school built at which both denominations could be taught. Nevertheless, the problem of denominational schools was not thereby solved, for the Catholic schoolchildren later once again had to go to the school in Reipoltskirchen, and it was demanded that a “parish school” be built in Ginsweiler for all Catholic schoolchildren from the villages of Ginsweiler, Adenbach, Becherbach and Cronenberg. This school, however, was never built. The Ginsweiler schoolhouse was converted in such a way in 1929 that the teachers’ dwellings became a new classroom. What had hitherto been the small Catholic classroom was made into a teaching material room. In a new semi-detached house, the two teachers’ dwellings were now housed. The dispute over whether there should be two denominational schools or simply one Christian-community school now and then led the Ginsweiler schoolchildren's parents into great controversy, and in the 1920s, even to school strikes. After the Second World War, the denominational school was reintroduced, and it existed until 1967. At the community school that then came into being were at first one classroom for primary school pupils and one for Hauptschule students. Today, the primary school pupils attend the school in Odenbach and the Hauptschule students attend the corresponding school in Lauterecken. The Ginsweiler schoolhouse was converted into a civic centre in 1982. The nearest Gymnasien are the ones in Lauterecken and Meisenheim.

=== Transport ===
Ginsweiler lies on Landesstraße 382 (Odenbach–Kaiserslautern). To the northwest runs Bundesstraße 420. The nearest Autobahn interchanges are rather far away (Kaiserslautern 30 km, Kusel 35 km, Wörrstadt 45 km).

Ginsweiler lies within the area covered by the VRN. The nearest railway station is Lauterecken-Grumbach on the Lautertalbahn, 8 km away, with trains going to Kaiserslautern. Formerly there was also a station in Odenbach only 5 km away. The station is served weekdays by a few buses on route 268. There is also bus route 131, which on working days runs as a direct link from Ginsweiler to Kaiserslautern Central Station.

== Famous people ==
=== Sons and daughters of the town ===
Lotte Mühlborn née Maurer (b. 1877 in Ginsweiler; d. 1965 in Kaiserslautern) — She came from the “Upper Mill” near Ginsweiler and became known as a folk poet. Married to a schoolteacher, she lived in Altrip and Hirschhorn, and then in her later years in Kaiserslautern. Her works – poems and narratives – appeared in many regional magazines.

=== Famous people associated with the municipality ===
Wilhelm Weitzel (b. 1883 in Kleinkarlbach; d. 1945 in Bad Dürkheim) — He was from 1908 to 1922 a schoolteacher in Ginsweiler, and was said to be a well-liked schoolmaster. He busied himself outside teaching with microörganisms. He published various scientific works about the results of his research. Together with his wife, a writer, he died in an air raid on Bad Dürkheim late in the Second World War.
