= Odenbach =

- Municipality
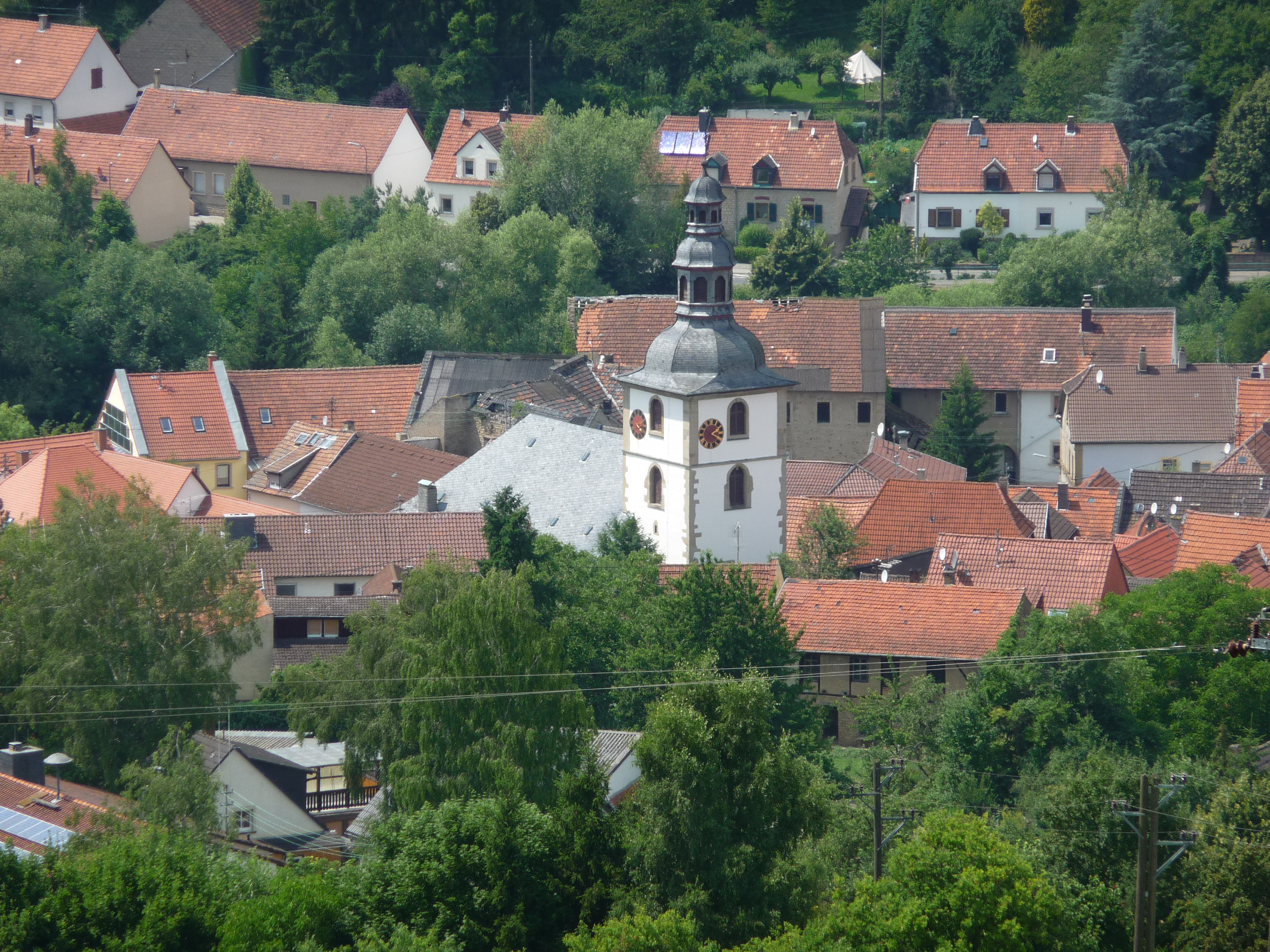
- village center and church

- Coat of arms

- Location of Odenbach within Kusel district
- Interactive map of Odenbach
- Location within Germany Location within Rhineland-Palatinate
- Coordinates: 49°41′05″N 7°39′05″E
- Country: Germany
- State: Rhineland-Palatinate
- District: Kusel
- Municipal assoc.: Lauterecken-Wolfstein

Government
  - Mayor (2019–24): Helga Becker

Area
  - Total: 7.95 km^{2} (3.07 sq mi)
- Elevation: 160 m (520 ft)

Population (2025-12-31)
  - Total: 755
  - Density: 95.0/km^{2} (246/sq mi)
- Time zone: UTC+01:00 (CET)
  - Summer (DST): UTC+02:00 (CEST)
- Postal codes: 67748
- Dialling codes: 06753
- Vehicle registration: KUS

Odenbach is an Ortsgemeinde – a municipality belonging to a Verbandsgemeinde, a kind of collective municipality – in the Kusel district in Rhineland-Palatinate, Germany. It belongs to the Verbandsgemeinde Lauterecken-Wolfstein.

== Geography ==
=== Location ===
The municipality lies northeast of Lauterecken at the mouth of its eponymous river, the Odenbach, where it empties into the river Glan in the North Palatine Uplands. Odenbach also lies on Bundesstraße 420. The village lies on both sides of the Glan where the valley floor's elevation is 155 m above sea level. The valleys are squeezed somewhat into a narrow gap by various mountains. Foremost of these on the Glan's left bank are the Bennerberg (308 m) and the Bornberg with its outliers stretching towards Meisenheim, while on the right bank are the Galgenberg (326 m above sea level) and the Hagelkreuz (357 m). Furthermore, in the gore formed by the Glan and Odenbach is the plateau of the Hellerwald and the Streit. The municipal area measures 800 ha, of which 465 ha is farmed, 233 ha is wooded (municipality's share, 54 ha), 83 ha is settled or used for transport, 8 ha is recreational and 11 ha is open water.

=== Neighbouring municipalities ===
Odenbach borders in the north on the town of Meisenheim, in the east on the municipalities of Reiffelbach and Becherbach, in the south on the municipality of Adenbach, in the southwest on the municipality of Cronenberg and in the west on the municipality of Medard.

=== Municipality’s layout ===
Odenbach's appearance up until the early 19th century was characterized by its girding wall with two gates, the Obertor (Upper Gate) and the Untertor (Lower Gate), and three defensive towers. In the village core, the mediaeval street network has remained largely preserved. With only a few exceptions, most of the village's buildings were destroyed in the great fire of 1733. The village wall was razed in 1828, and only a few bits of it remain today. Thereafter, the village spread out in the course of the 19th century beyond the former village moat along the newly built Grabenstraße (“Moat Street”), Adenbacher Straße and Glanstraße. After the Second World War, the municipality opened three new residential areas, beginning in 1953 the one in the rural cadastral areas known as “Im Schofel” and “In Kohlenstein”, a few years later the one in the rural cadastral area known as “In Burghöhl” and in the 1970s the one in the rural cadastral area known as “Am Schächerweg”. The loam- and loess-rich Glan valley floor, as well as the heights stretching towards Roth, make for outstanding conditions for agriculture. The mountain slopes on the Glan's left bank and the Odenbach's right – a rural cadastral area known as “Igelsbach” (literally “Hedgehog’s Brook”) – offered the best chances for winegrowing, which was mentioned as early as 893. By the late 19th century, vineyards took up some 10% of the area within Odenbach's limits. As a result of the changes to agricultural structure, winegrowing came to an end in the 1960s. The woodlands, which still make up roughly one third of the municipal area, served the local farmers before the First World War as a further support for their endeavours. Foremost among its boons to them was of course firewood for private use, but it was also useful for tanbark harvesting, and it yielded the wood that was needed for building and woodworking. The shift to other energy sources, however, has led to a relative loss of importance for the woodlands.

== History ==
=== Antiquity ===
The earliest traces of settlement in and around Odenbach go back to the New Stone Age. Archaeological finds from the Bronze Age that followed, however, have been rather sparse, but they become richer again with the rise of the Celts. From the early Iron Age (Hallstatt times, about 800-500 BC) comes the burying ground that was unearthed on the Galgenberg. Furthermore, digging work in 1934 at the “Hellerwald” sporting ground brought to light another burying ground, this one from the later Iron Age (La Tène times, about 500 BC to AD 1), which long lay on a homestead in the cadastral area known as “Im hintern Spitzwasen”, whose foundation remnants are known. Finds of ancient coins show that there was uninterrupted settlement here in the transitional period between Celtic and Roman times. Indeed, Roman roads once ran along the heights to the Roßberg and the Ebernburg either side of the Glan. Unearthed during clearing work in the cadastral area known as “Im Neuberg” was one of the most important troves: some 150 gold coins attributed to the East Celtic tribe of the Leuker. After Julius Caesar conquered Gaul, the inhabitants adopted Roman culture. The State Museum in Speyer keeps a bronze statuette of Minerva found in Adenbach and another of Mercury found in Odenbach. During the Migration Period, between about AD 375 to 550, the Medard-Odenbach area must have been a refuge.

=== Middle Ages ===
After the Franks had finished taking the land, a Merovingian prince donated the lordship over St. Medard to the Bishopric of Verdun on the Meuse sometime about the year 600. While the Church of St. Medard was the hub for local missionary efforts, Odenbach was the administrative hub. On 20 May 841, Odenbach itself had its first documentary mention. Out of the lordship's Vogtei grew bit by bit the Gericht (court, or court district) of Odenbach, the same as the territory later known as the Ämter of Odenbach and Lauterecken. After the Frankish Imperial partitions in 843 and in 870, the Bishopric of Verdun found that it was somewhat less than straightforward to hold onto East Frankish holdings. Upon the accession of Bishop of Verdun Albert I of Marcey in 1156, Frederick I, Holy Roman Emperor, guaranteed Verdun's rights. To strengthen the claim to the lordship, a moated castle was built on the gore of land at the Odenbach's mouth in the same century, although its buildings were torn down in the Thirty Years' War (1618-1648) by Spanish occupiers. By the mid 19th century, most of what was left had fallen into ruin. One remnant still stands today, however, the ruin of a tower known as the Weiherturm. Remnants of other old buildings, too, still bear witness to the village's centuries-long history. The castle belonged to the St. Medard estate, which itself belonged to the Bishop of Verdun. It later became the seat of the Barons of Fürstenwächter. The Verdun holding around Medard and Odenbach eventually formed along with those around Baumholder and Wolfersweiler, the Remigiusland and the Amt of Veldenz on the Moselle the County of Veldenz. In 1444, the County of Veldenz met its end when Count Friedrich III of Veldenz died without a male heir. His daughter Anna wed King Ruprecht's son Count Palatine Stephan of the House of Wittelsbach. By uniting his own Palatine holdings with the now otherwise heirless County of Veldenz – his wife had inherited the county, but not her father's title – and by redeeming the hitherto pledged County of Zweibrücken, Stephan founded a new County Palatine, as whose comital residence he chose the town of Zweibrücken: the County Palatine – later Duchy – of Palatinate-Zweibrücken. This state in turn met its end in 1798 after French Revolutionary troops had occupied the German lands on the Rhine’s left bank. Odenbach had already become the seat of a Schultheiß by 1387.

=== Modern times ===
Duke Johann I freed the villagers of Odenbach and a few of the outlying villages from serfdom in 1579. In 1596, they were also granted market rights.

==== Recent times ====
In 1798, French Revolutionary troops annexed the land. Administratively, Odenbach formed together with Adenbach, Ginsweiler, Reiffelbach and Schmittweiler a mairie (“mayoralty”) belonging to the Canton of Lauterecken, the Arrondissement of Kaiserslautern and the Department of Mont-Tonnerre (or Donnersberg in German). After French rule, once Napoleon had been driven out of the country, the Congress of Vienna drew new boundaries yet again. After a transitional time, Odenbach was grouped into the bayerischer Rheinkreis, later known as Rheinpfalz (“Rhenish Palatinate”), an exclave of the Kingdom of Bavaria in 1816 with the rank of Bürgermeisterei (“mayoralty”). In the 1870s, three coal pits were opened and almost 500 miners were employed. In the course of administrative restructuring in Rhineland-Palatinate, the 1,000-year-old administrative entity of Odenbach was dissolved in 1970, and the municipality was grouped into the Verbandsgemeinde of Lauterecken.

=== Population development ===
In 1566, there were 69 families registered at Odenbach, while in 1609 there were 62. In the latter case, they were broken down as follows: one innkeeper, twelve craftsmen, fourteen farmers, eleven winegrowers, five day labourers, two herdsmen and two gatekeepers. The events of the Thirty Years' War led to considerable loss of life and property. In 1656 (eight years after the war ended), only 23 families were left in Odenbach. On the occasion of the 1719 census, it was noted that there were 344 souls (some 76 families), of whom 30 were Catholic, 243 were Reformed and 71 were Lutheran. There were also four Jewish families. A huge demographic shift came about somewhat more than 120 years later that saw the village's population rise threefold. In 1843, 1,079 souls were counted, of whom 110 were Jewish. Besides the odd swing, either up or down, this population level has remained steady until the present day. This level was held steady only by the outflow of people, both to German cities and industrial centres and overseas, mainly to the United States. Until the Second World War ended, roughly one third of the inhabitants were farmers, each with a plot of between 5 and 20 ha, while another third worked in trades. The remaining third of the population was made up of both people in learned professions and day labourers. Today, only 12 commercial concerns can still be found in the village, mainly family businesses and small businesses. Most Odenbach inhabitants in the workforce work elsewhere. As for farms, only two now remain.

The following table shows population development since early Bavarian times for Odenbach, with some figures broken down by religious denomination:

Year	1825	1835	1871	1905	1939	1961	1999	2007
Total	878	1,113	1,951	1,069	1,025	1,095	1,105	924
Catholic	39					126
Evangelical	765					965
Jewish	74					2

=== Municipality’s name ===
The oldest name known for Odenbach is drawn from the village's location on the now like-named brook and can presumably be traced back to the pre-Germanic name for the stream, Audina. According to researchers Dolch and Greule, writing in 1990, Odenbach's first documentary mention came in an 841 document that named Uotenbach. Other names that the village has borne over time are, among others, de Odenbahc (893), de Ottenbach (1194) and Odenbach (1222). According to Dolch's and Greule's research, the name is made up of the syllable —bach (German for “brook”), as with many other places in the region, to which is prefixed what was originally a personal name, either “Odo” or “Otto”, possibly the village's founder.

== Religion ==
In Prüm Abbey’s 893 directory of holdings, the Prümer Urbar, a church in Odenbach was mentioned for the first time, one consecrated to Saint Peter. It is one of the oldest in the whole Glan valley. In 1683, the chapel fell to the pickaxe after falling into disrepair. On the same spot arose the Late Baroque hall church in 1763-1764. The churchtower was built in three steps: the ground floor was built in the 13th century, the second level in 1508, and the third in 1666 along with its three eight-sided cupolae, built one on top of the other. It is believed that the Prüm proprietary church lost its independence under Archbishop of Mainz Adalbert II (1138-1141) and was placed under Mainz ecclesiastical jurisdiction by reason of Verdun's proprietary church rights and the Frankish Imperial partitions in the 9th century. Both Medard’s and Odenbach’s churches thereby passed into the ownership of the monastery at Disibodenberg. Under Archbishop Gerlach of Mainz (1353-1371), the Church of Odenbach got its independence back on 15 June 1367, and has held onto it without interruption ever since. In 1548, the parish became Lutheran, and in 1588, Reformed. In the last fourth of the 18th century, however, a number of Catholics and Lutherans migrated to the village, forming both a Catholic and a Lutheran parish, both of which sought a simultaneum. Any disagreements over church use were settled by the applicable sections of the Treaty of Ryswick (30 October 1697), but differences between Lutherans and Calvinists did not come to an end until 1818, when the two denominations united to form the Palatine State Church. Since 1970, the Evangelical parish of Odenbach (Odenbach, Adenbach, Ginsweiler) has been united with the parish of Gangloff (Gangloff, Roth, Becherbach, Reiffelbach). Several local clergymen have earned regional acclaim (see Famous people below). For a while, the Jewish share of the population was quite big. After the great fire of 1733, the Palatinate-Zweibrücken Judenschultheiß (“reeve of the Jews”) Salomon Meyer acquired a burnt-out spot on Kirchhofstraße where he built a prayer parlour. After Meyer's death, his widow sold the building in 1802 to the Jewish religious community, who used it for worship until 1938, the time of Kristallnacht. In 1989, the Förderverein zur Erhaltung der Synagoge (“Promotional Association for Preserving the Synagogue”) acquired the run-down building, now under monumental protection, from private ownership and restored it with the Association's own means and also government funding. Worth seeing are the wall paintings, which are now once more visible.

== Politics ==
=== Municipal council ===
The council is made up of 12 council members, who were elected by majority vote at the municipal election held on 7 June 2009, and the honorary mayor as chairman.

=== Mayor ===
Odenbach's mayor is Helga Becker.

=== Coat of arms ===
The municipality's arms might be described thus: Vert a bend sinister wavy argent between a bend wavy of the same between two grapevines of the field, and a grapevine of the field.

The arms are modelled after the imprint of a court seal used as early as 1490. The bend and the bend sinister (slanted stripes) are meant to illustrate the Odenbach emptying into the Glan. The arms have been borne since 19 October 1853 when they were approved by King Maximilian II of Bavaria.

== Culture and sightseeing ==
=== Buildings ===
The following are listed buildings or sites in Rhineland-Palatinate’s Directory of Cultural Monuments:

- Protestant parish church, Kirchhofstraße 29 – aisleless church, 1764/1765, architect Philipp Heinrich Hellermann, Zweibrücken; tower 1508 (ground floor from the 14th century), floors added 1766
- Hauptstraße 7 – town hall; sandstone-framed plastered building with arcade hall, about 1570; characterizes village’s appearance (see also below)
- Hauptstraße 24 – former rectory; stately building with hipped roof, 1788, architect Friedrich Gerhard Wahl, Zweibrücken; open shed with stables (see also below)
- Hauptstraße 41/43 – three-sided estate, 1818; two buildings with half-hipped roofs, one-floor side building, two-part gate complex; together with Hauptstraße 45 characterizes village’s appearance
- Hauptstraße 45 – three-sided estate, 1820; two buildings with half-hipped roofs, roofed gate complex; together with Hauptstraße 41/43 characterizes village’s appearance
- Kirchhofstraße 19 – former synagogue; one-floor plastered building with timber-frame gables, marked 512 (= 1752); women’s gallery 1835, Late Baroque paintings
- Obere Glanstraße, at the graveyard – gravestone, sandstone slab with relief, marked 1616
- Waldwegstraße – bridge; one-arch quarrystone-block bridge, marked 1748
- Jewish graveyard (monumental zone) – enclosed area, possibly laid out in 1845; 74 sandstone gravestones, great variety of shapes, 1846 to 1938, since 1974 a common grave with bones from the old graveyard in Lauterecken

==== Weiherturm ====
Anyone nearing the village of Odenbach on Bundesstraße 420 catches sight of a ruined tower on the village’s southern edge, in the gore formed by the Odenbach where it empties into the Glan. These remnants of the Weiherturm (“Pond Tower”) are all that is left of a 12th-century moated castle, Burg Odenbach, which is said to be the municipality's defining landmark. This lowland castle was once a Bishopric of Verdun holding, is believed to have been built about 1180 and had its first documentary mention in 1303. A 1415 certificate of enfeoffment describes the extent of the castle, the tower, the moat and the bailey. Investigations in the early 1980s yielded the finding that old building work stretched from the tower along the Weiherpfad (path) almost all the way to Hauptstraße (“Main Street”). The castle building itself was ruined by Spanish occupiers in 1620-1623 in such a way that it became no longer fit to be a dwelling. In the winter of 1850-1851, what was left of the complex fell down. In 1683, French “scorched earth” occupiers had tried to blow a hole in the tower, but as the charge was greater than what was needed for that, great chunks fell off the tower, leaving it in a collapsed state.

==== Defensive wall ====
Right near the Weiherturm to the northeast, about 200 paces away, remnants of the old village fortifications can still be seen. They were mentioned as long ago as 1377. Roughly one fourth of the old girding wall is preserved.

==== Town hall ====
The Rathaus was built in 1570, as can be seen in a letter of complaint written by the then Odenbach pastor and sent by him in 1572 to the village administration. As the municipality's pride and a symbol of its self-assurance at that time, it served in earlier years not only as the administrative centre but also as the hub of village life, with weddings and other occasions being celebrated there. The two-storey building with a gable facing the street was originally equipped with an oriel window. On the ground floor was a hall with a flat ceiling resting on two stone columns. The gable side was fitted with two gables, each with a side façade with a chamfered round arch. Late Baroque wooden doors were removed during conversion work in 1950. The upper floor was formerly adorned with Renaissance windows, only two of which are still preserved. During conversion work in the late 18th century, the tracery windows were replaced with oval windows and the oriel window was removed.

==== Former Erkerhaus ====
To be seen at the house across the street from the town hall, the Erkerhaus (“Oriel Window House”), in the half-oval lintel is the keystone from the former gateway arch showing the still preserved coat of arms once borne by the Lords of Fürstenwärther, holders of the castle at Odenbach, with two Palatine lions facing each other. The old building was built in the first fourth of the 16th century and served as a Vogtei seat. By Duke of Palatinate-Zweibrücken Friedrich Ludwig's decree, the house's ownership was transferred to his children from a morganatic marriage. In 1906, the brothers Leo and Emanuel Löb acquired the building, tore it down and in its stead built the house that now stands.

==== Former rectory ====
An earlier rectory in Odenbach was badly damaged in the harsh winter of 1784-1785 and could no longer be used as a home. Thus arose a new one in 1788-1789, on the same spot, a two-storey Classicist building designed by Palatinate-Zweibrücken’s “countryside and boulevard director” (Land- und Chausseedirektor) Gerhard Friedrich Wahl, which is striking for its tight geometric shapes and its simplicity. Also belonging to the house were a barn, a stable, a bakehouse and an open shed whose roof rests on two wooden pillars, the whole built in a square shape so that a closed yard was formed within. In the early 1960s, the district savings bank (Kreissparkasse) of Kusel acquired the property and set up commercial premises on the ground floor, which were festively dedicated and opened to the public on 1 December 1965.

==== Mountain cellars on the forest path ====
Somewhat outside the village, beyond the Odenbach, lying on the left side of a farm lane leading to Cronenberg, are some 40 mountain cellars. When agriculture underwent profound changes in the latter half of the 18th century through measures instituted by the insightful Duke Christian IV of Palatinate-Zweibrücken, particularly the measures involving growing potatoes and mangelwurzels, storage space also had to be found for this produce. In the village itself, hardly a house with a cellar was to be found. The only way out of this dearth of storage room was to dig these mountain cellars. The clayey marl on the slope of the forest path was best suited to this task. Skilled miners, many of whom were available in the village at the time, set to work digging many cellars. One peculiarity that these cellars can claim is their ownership history. Nowhere is it written down who owned each one, neither in any register nor in any cadastral survey. Ownership was simply assumed and acknowledged informally.

=== Regular events ===
Until a few years ago, Odenbach held its kermis (church consecration festival, locally known as the Kerb) on the third Sunday before Saint Bartholomew's Day (24 August, and thus the kermis would have been held in late July or early August), but the municipal council then decided to change this longstanding custom and fix the festival's timing at the third Sunday in August. After the village youth hold a parade, the focus shifts to the kermis square (Kerbeplatz), where the Straußpredigt, a kind of “sermon”, is delivered. This is a rhyming summary of the year's events in the village. On Martinmas (11 November), the Martinsumzug (a parade) is held in late afternoon, and attended by many children, even from outside the village. Around the beginning of Advent, the association of local clubs holds a Christmas Market. The gymnasium at the primary school serves as a venue for celebratory events and concerts.

=== Clubs ===
Odenbach has the following clubs:

- Angelsportverein — angling club
- Arbeiterwohlfahrt — workers’ welfare organization
- Deutsches Rotes Kreuz — German Red Cross
- Förderverein Freiwillige Feuerwehr — fire brigade promotional association
- Förderverein zur Erhaltung der Synagoge — Promotional Association for Preserving the Synagogue
- Hundeverein — dog club
- Karnevalverein — Carnival club
- Landfrauenverein — countrywomen's club
- Männergesangverein/Gemischter Chor — men's singing club/mixed choir
- Musikverein — music club
- Protestantischer Kirchenchor — Protestant church choir
- Schützenverein „Edelweiß“ — shooting club
- Turn- und Sportverein — gymnastic and sport club
- VdK — social advocacy group
- Verkehrsverein — transport club

== Economy and infrastructure ==
=== Economic structure ===
In bygone days, Odenbach's economy was characterized by the factors covered in the next four sections.

==== Farming ====
Foremost among agricultural endeavours was raising the Glan-Donnersberg breed of cattle. Winegrowing was undertaken on the slopes of the Bennerberg, Neuberg and Bornberg, as was fruitgrowing. The much sought-after winter apples, and especially the Glan plums were sent by the wagonload in the months of September and October as far as Hamburg. Trade in cattle, grain and wine was mainly done by the Jews who lived locally. Owing to anti-Semitic legislation and boycotts instigated by the Third Reich, this trade eventually came to an end.

==== Coal mining ====
Collieries were to be found on both sides of the Glan. The earliest report of coal mining in Odenbach came in 1607 with an account of coal being recovered in the “Leckberg” below the “Hohl”. This, however, was not the beginning of coal mining in the local area, for miners had already been mentioned in a 1453 military examination roll. Mined at the coalpits around Odenbach and Roth, galleries in the Blochersberg, Igelsgraben, Pickelwiese, Hagelkreuz and Schinn in the years from 1821 to 1880 were all together 583 154 t of coal. A report about the coal yield from the Carlsgrube colliery, which lay in the rural cadastral area called “In Dämm” and was run privately from 1788 to 1865, is unavailable. The above-named state-run operations – owned by the Bavarian state – were shut down in 1885.

==== Crafts and other occupations ====
When the commercial register was first started on 1 January 1908, there were 92 registered businesses. Now, there are only just over a dozen. The Glanmühle, which was mentioned in a document as early as 1387, and which was the estate mill for Odenbach, Adenbach, Ginsweiler, Cronenberg, Medard, Becherbach, Gangloff and Reiffelbach, was shut down for good after an eventful history in 1938. In 1752, the watermill was built on the Odenbach, and it was shut down for good in 1907.

==== Quarrying and stonecutting ====
Within Odenbach's limits lie roughly twelve abandoned sandstone quarries. They bear witness to a once flourishing industry. Foremost among them was the former quarry and stonecutting business on the Kaiserhof. The yellow-veined sandstone from the cadastral area known as “In der Hinterwies” was easy to work and in demand for state buildings, town halls, schoolhouses, business premises and villas. Until 1914, almost 300 men were employed at this quarry. From the other quarries came stone mainly used for making hewn stones for window and door walling and lintels, and also for making stone crocks for sauerkraut, wine press vats and fruit presses. According to a 1926 state examination certificate, the sandstone from the mountain ridge between the Odenbach and the Glan was one of Germany's hardest. As such, it was well suited for making millstones, and Odenbach millstones were put to use from the Hunsrück to the Moselle.

=== Education ===
Duke Alexander of Palatinate-Zweibrücken issued an edict in 1505 requiring his subjects to send their children to school to learn to read and write, but not beyond the age of 13 (in early-16th-century German: “…zu schulen thun laßen lern schreiben und leßen, aber nit über XIII jare des schulers alters…”). The earliest verifiable school intendant was mentioned in 1566. Shortly thereafter, the municipality built a school building on Kirchhofstraße, which was used until 1828. About 1710, the Lutheran community also hired its own teacher. The teacher taught classes at first at the village hall until a suitable building was acquired on Kirchhofstraße. In Duke Gustav Samuel's time (1718-1731), the Catholic community, too, hired its own teacher. Since the municipality had a small population, the means to run such a school system any longer could not be raised. After a short time, classes ended. After the 1818 Protestant Union, which saw the Lutherans and the Calvinists unite into one denomination, a boys’ school was established at the old Calvinist school and a girls’ school at the old Lutheran school. The two schools soon outgrew their venues, as can be seen in a report: “In Odenbach are found two schoolhouses, of which the one is assigned for teaching boys and the other for teaching girls. Neither is fit for the requirements, but exceptionally bad is the location of the girls’ school, which contains only one parlour and a dark kitchen. This room serves as both the classroom and the livingroom for the schoolteacher with five children and a maid, and quite often as a kitchen.” The municipality built a roomier schoolhouse in 1828 on Untergasse with two classrooms and the requisite teachers’ dwellings. Since a third teaching post needed to be filled by 1862, the municipality acquired a building on Grabenstraße that, after remodelling, came to be known as the Kleines Schulhaus – “Little Schoolhouse”. In 1960, all classes were transferred to the new school building in the cadastral area “Auf dem Hubacker”. Today, only the primary school classes are taught there. Odenbach also has one kindergarten.

=== Transport ===
As far back as Celtic times, there must have been a bridleway from Trier going towards Worms by way of Odenbach. The village was linked to the Roman road network by way of Becherbach to the Hochstrooß (Hohe Straße in Modern High German or “High Road” in English) that led from Kreuznach to Otterberg, and likewise by another such road from Kreuznach by way of the “Hub” to Baumholder, the so-called Grumbacher Straße. A path through the Hellerwald (forest) linked Odenbach with Otterberg. All of these road links still existed until the 19th century, then losing their traditional importance as the valley roads were extended. Work began on the roadbed for the Odenbach valley road in 1835 from Schneckenhausen, ending in Odenbach ten years later. The local linking road to Roth and Reiffelbach got a new roadbed in 1885. In 1938, on military grounds, the Nazis expanded the road now known as Bundesstraße 420. In 1896, the Glan Valley Railway (Glantalbahn) from Lauterecken to Staudernheim came into service, and only a short time later, in 1903-1904, was double-tracked for strategic reasons throughout the Glan valley. Nevertheless, in 1986, passenger service on the local railway came to an end, with goods service ending, too, a few years later. Running through the village today is Bundesstraße 420. The stretch of the Glan Valley Railway running through Odenbach is out of service. On its tracks, visitors may ride draisines. Serving Lauterecken is a railway station on the Lauter Valley Railway (Lautertalbahn).

== Famous people ==
=== Sons and daughters of the town ===
- Philipp Wilbrand Jakob Müller (b. 1771 Odenbach; d. 1851 Odenbach)

From 1792 to 1811 vicar in Odenbach, from 1811 to 1851 pastor, Müller was also deacon of the deaconry of Lauterecken in 1820. From youth he also dedicated himself to a secondary occupation in the natural sciences, especially botany. His correspondence with the botanist Johann Wilhelm Daniel Koch is nowadays kept at the Palatine Museum for Natural History (Pfalzmuseum für Naturkunde or Pollichia-Museum) in Bad Dürkheim. In later years he gave himself over with fondness to entomology. Various publications bear witness to his work in this scientific endeavour. In the Entomologische Hefte, published at Frankfurt am Main in 1803, which can be considered the groundwork for a later description of the fauna of the Department of Mont-Tonnerre (or Donnersberg in German), he put together the whole first issue containing a monograph on the hister beetles, and in the second issue he also wrote a monograph about Dorcatoma (a genus of beetles). Other than these, there were also many other publications about beetle and other insect species. He was a member of a few natural research societies, foremost the one at Leipzig. In 1818, he belonged to the Union Synod, which oversaw the union of the two Protestant denominations, Lutheranism and Calvinism, into one.

=== Famous people associated with the municipality ===
- Georg Ulrich Geyßel (b. 1622 in Schwarzenbach; d. 1699 in Odenbach)

From 1671 to 1699 pastor in Odenbach and inspector of the Claße Meisenheim, Geyßel was also from 1671 to 1674 and again from 1678 until his death (1 February 1699) Assistant of the Reformed High Consistory in Zweibrücken.

- Georg Friedrich Ludwig Müller (b. 1734 in Kleeburg; d. 1811 in Odenbach)

From 1760 to 1764 professor at the Gymnasium in Zweibrücken, from 1764 to 1811 pastor in Odenbach, in 1783 inspector of the Claße Meisenheim and in 1798 local consistory president for the Obermoschel consistorial church, Müller was also, beginning in 1806, local consistory president in Rockenhausen. He was one of his time’s foremost minds. Besides his mother tongue (German), Müller mastered the ancient tongues of Latin, Greek and Hebrew as well as French and a few Oriental languages. Besides theology, his favourite scientific fields were mathematics, astronomy and botany. His library held a wealth of works – 2,580 volumes – with some works dating from the 16th and 17th centuries, among them four incunables. The books dealt with not only theology and philosophy but also various natural sciences and the humanities. Müller’s library is nowadays owned by the Library of the Evangelical Regional Church Council (Evangelischer Landeskirchenrat) in Speyer.

- Ernst Ludwig Ferdinand von Fürstenwerther (b. 1737 in Meisenheim; d. 1821 in Meisenheim)

Fürstenwerther, as the eleventh of eighteen children from a comital family, was one of the holders of the castle in Odenbach, a member of the Régiment Royal Deux-Ponts in the Seven Years' War and, later, a participant in the American War of Independence, in which both he and his brother Karl Leopold were recognized for their outstanding service. The two of them were decorated personally by George Washington, receiving a high order.

- Friedrich Gerhard Wahl (b. 1747 in Annweiler; d. 1826 in Kaiserslautern)

Master builder (construction above and below ground) in the service of the Duchy of Palatinate-Zweibrücken, Wahl spent his youth in Odenbach, and later administered the Duchy’s whole road network. He also became well known as a master churchbuilder, building among other churches the one in Odenbach.
