= Reiffelbach =

- Municipality
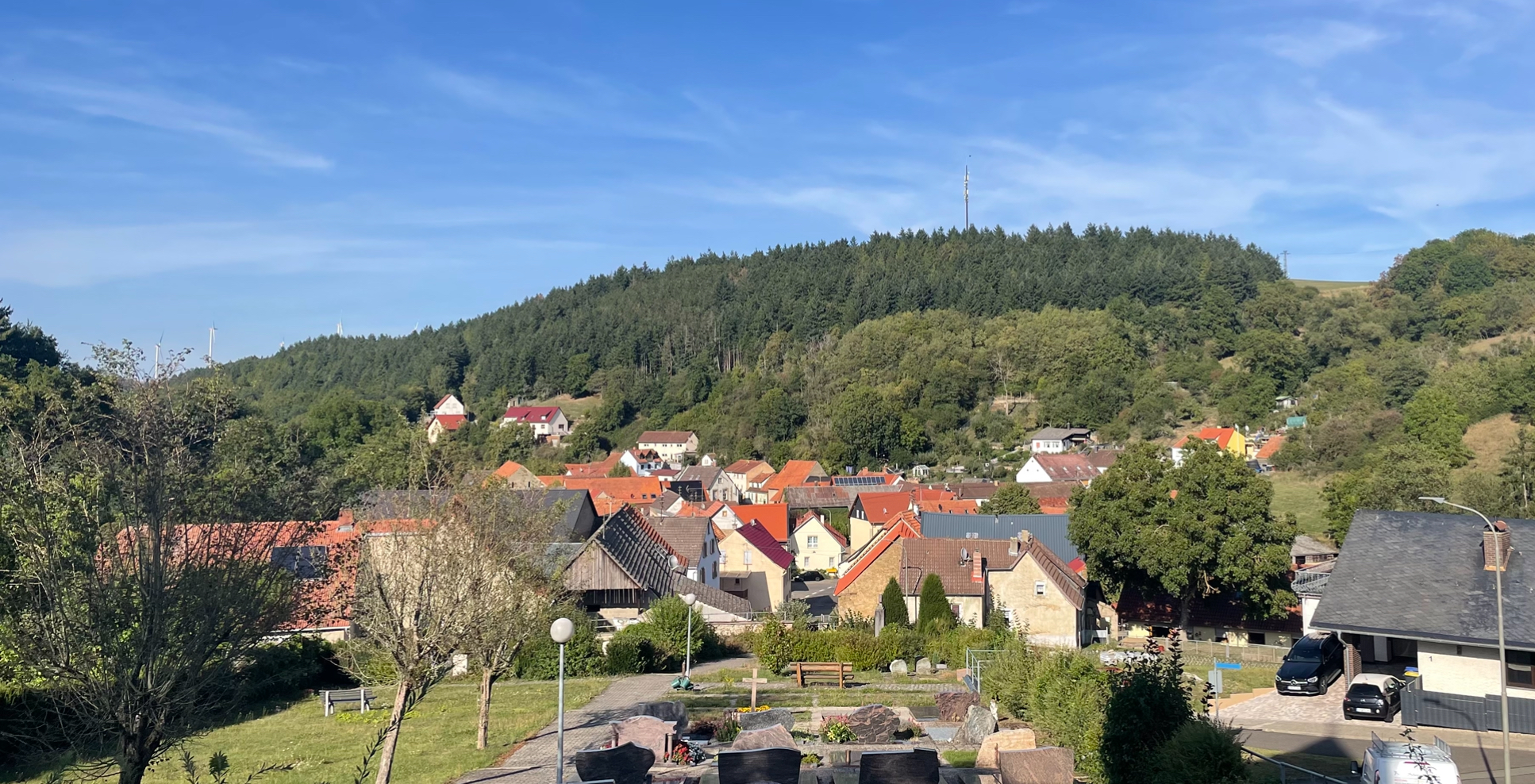
- View of Reiffelbach from the steps of the Protestant church

- Coat of arms

- Location of Reiffelbach within Bad Kreuznach district
- Interactive map of Reiffelbach
- Location within Germany Location within Rhineland-Palatinate
- Coordinates: 49°41′13.43″N 7°41′9.57″E
- Country: Germany
- State: Rhineland-Palatinate
- District: Bad Kreuznach
- Municipal assoc.: Nahe-Glan

Government
  - Mayor (2019–24): Gerhard Geib

Area
  - Total: 4.46 km^{2} (1.72 sq mi)
- Elevation: 326 m (1,070 ft)

Population (2025-12-31)
  - Total: 210
  - Density: 47/km^{2} (120/sq mi)
- Time zone: UTC+01:00 (CET)
  - Summer (DST): UTC+02:00 (CEST)
- Postal codes: 67829
- Dialling codes: 06753
- Vehicle registration: KH
- Website: www.reiffelbach.de

Reiffelbach is an Ortsgemeinde – a municipality belonging to a Verbandsgemeinde, a kind of collective municipality – in the Bad Kreuznach district in Rhineland-Palatinate, Germany. It belongs to the Verbandsgemeinde Nahe-Glan.

== Geography ==
=== Location ===
Reiffelbach, a clump village, lies on the like-named brook, the Reiffelbach, east of the Glan in the North Palatine Uplands. The municipal area measures 446 ha and the village sits at an elevation of 326 m above sea level.

=== Land use ===
Woodlands today occupy more than 100 ha of the municipal area. Until the first afforestation efforts in the 1950s, there were only broadleaf forests in Reiffelbach, with the predominant species being beeches and oaks. Subsequent private afforestation projects were undertaken, on the forestry office's advice, with spruce and Douglas-fir trees. In 1932, the forest in the “Muhl” (rural cadastral area) was cleared and meadows were laid out there. In 1963, the “Kleeberg” (“Clover Mountain”) was bought by the forestry office, as was the “Frauenhölle” (“Women’s Hell”) in 1965, and both were afforested with coniferous forest (larch trees, among others). Until the early 20th century, the foremost uses of the local woodlands were for building material, mine timbers and firewood, and oak bark was harvested and shipped to Meisenheim for tanning. Today, the only commercial use is as firewood.

=== Neighbouring municipalities ===
Clockwise from the north, Reiffelbach's neighbours are the town of Meisenheim and the municipalities of Callbach, Schmittweiler, Becherbach and Odenbach, all of which likewise lie within the Bad Kreuznach district but for Odenbach, which lies in the neighbouring Kusel district.

== History ==
In 1293, Reiffelbach had its first documentary mention as Rifelbach. At this time, one third of the tithes were given as a fief by the knight Sir Eberhard of Odenbach to his wife Agnes. In 1321 came the first documentary mention of a chapel in Reiffelbach, belonging to the Order of Malta. In 1370, Reiffelbach was mentioned as Ryffelbach and Riffelbach. In 1387, Reiffelbach was bound to the mill on the Glan in Odenbach, making that mill, as part of the feudal estate, the only one that villagers from Reiffelbach could use. This mill ran until 1938. In the early 15th century, the village's name appeared in documents in several different forms, among which were Rifelbach (1401), Ryffelbach (1404), Riffelbach (1406) and Rieffelbach (1440). In 1453, the first miners were recorded in neighbouring Odenbach. In 1485, the Reiffelbach church was transferred to the Otterberg Monastery at Meisenheim. In 1510, the village's name was recorded as ryffelbach. The earliest mention of winegrowing dates from 1516, and this continued for centuries, finally ending in the 1960s. In 1526, the Reformation was introduced into Meisenheim, with its inevitable attendant effect in Reiffelbach, given the ecclesiastical link. In the years leading up to 1600, there was coal mining in Reiffelbach. Dating from 1601 is a boundary stone that was found on the Lehenberg, at the limit with Schmittweiler. In 1667, the village's name was recorded as Reyffelbach. In 1683, some Franciscans came to Meisenheim. These were the first Catholics to show up in the area since the Reformation. After the Nine Years' War (1688–1697; known in Germany as the Pfälzischer Erbfolgekrieg, or War of the Palatine Succession), Reiffelbach's chapel had fallen into disrepair, but it was not until 1721 that it was put back in order. Then, it was used by all three faiths, Catholics, Lutherans and Calvinists. In 1724, the village's name was recorded as Reifelbach. In 1739, some families emigrated. In 1740, new applications were being made for leave to prospect for coal. From 1750 to 1758, there was a glassworks, the Christianshütte, in Reiffelbach which employed 23 workers and made windowglass. Dating from 1776 is another boundary stone that was found in the Scherbelswald (forest). That same year, a homage list was published. In 1786, there were four coal pits being worked in Hollerbach (rural cadastral area). In 1815, as a result of the Congress of Vienna, Reiffelbach found itself in the Oberamt of Meisenheim in the Landgraviate of Hesse-Homburg. In 1832, a new schoolhouse was built in the village centre. In 1835, the chapel was torn down and auctioned. In 1846, coal mining occupied 378 ha. In 1849, a new church was built. In 1869, a miners’ association was founded. In 1870, during the Franco-Prussian War, passing troops occupied the village. In 1875, the men's singing club was founded. In 1885, a new alignment for the road to Roth/Odenbach was laid out. Reiffelbach, Gangloff and Becherbach were beset by a heavy storm. In 1910, the Reiffelbach villager Peter Stein earned the village's first driving licence. In 1912, the primary school was built. Only two years later, the First World War broke out. After it ended, those men from the village who had fallen or gone missing had their names engraved on the local war memorial. In 1920, electric light made its first appearance in Reiffelbach, while the Hollerbach and Pfarrwiese coal pits were closed; the Abrech I and II pits remained open, however. In 1921, the municipality decided that it was going to keep wild boars and goats, and also that year, a fire brigade was established in which all the village's men between the ages of 16 and 50 were required to serve. Although electric light was first seen in Reiffelbach in 1920, it was only in 1925 that the village was hooked up to the electrical grid. In 1926, the village's first threshing machine went into use, threshing the harvest at each of the local farms. The first motorcycle ever seen in Reiffelbach was ridden by villager Eduard Gräff in 1927. In 1929, an almshouse was built, and a postbus route was established from Odenbach by way of Reiffelbach to Dielkirchen. In 1931 the village saw its first reaper-binder go into service. In 1933, Flurbereinigung was undertaken in Reiffelbach by the Flurbereinigungsamt Neustadt (Neustadt Land Consolidation Office), and also in that year, a sporting ground was laid out in the Hartwiesen (this is now tennis courts). From 1934 to 1936, the municipal woodland “In der Muhl” was cleared; today this land is meadows. In 1935, another postbus route was established, this one running from Meisenheim by way of Reiffelbach to Dielkirchen. Despite the years of postbus service that the village had already seen, it was not until 1936 that Reiffelbach had its first car owner. It was the village schoolteacher, Müller. In 1938, the eighth school year was introduced, as was vocational school, which was compulsory. Also compulsory for many was service in the Wehrmacht, which became all too common with the outbreak of the Second World War in 1939. In 1945, German soldiers – Prussians – retreated through the village on their way to Roth; for a while, an artillery unit was stationed in the “Muhl”, which had been cleared some years earlier. That same year, the war ended and Germany was occupied by the victorious Allies (Reiffelbach found itself in the French zone). Once again, the fallen and missing had their names engraved on the local war memorial. This time also saw some private coal mining at the Hollerbach pit. Yet another postbus route, Landkraftpostlinie II (beginning from Rockenhausen), was instituted in 1948, and also that year, the farmers’ and winegrowers’ association was founded, although winegrowing would only continue in the village for another two decades or so; a conversation club was founded the next year. In 1952, a new, second bell was dedicated at the church, and it was decided that the village would keep a municipal bull. In 1953, the local chapter of the VdK, a social advocacy group, was founded. In 1954, some major work was undertaken on the waterworks, formerly centred at the coal galleries at the Hollerbach pits. There was now a high water cistern to pipe water into houses. Also in 1954, the monument of honour was built at the graveyard. In 1958, the shooting club “Tell” was founded, and the old schoolteacher's dwelling in the village centre was torn down. The same was done with the schoolhouse itself the following year, and the hunting association was founded. In 1960, the village's namesake brook, the Reiffelbach, was channelled into an underground pipe, and sewerage was laid in the streets. A new schoolteacher's dwelling was built in the lower village in 1961. In 1962, the football and sport club FSV Reiffelbach was founded. Also in the early and mid 1960s, a number of measures were undertaken by the forestry office to expand the village's woodlands. See Land use above. In 1966, a sporting ground was laid out in the Hollerbach, where the shooting club's clubhouse was also built at about the same time. In 1967, school grade levels 5 to 8 were transferred to the Gemeinschaftsschule (roughly “comprehensive school”) in nearby Meisenheim. In 1968, the “women’s singing circle” was founded. In 1968, the old parish hall in the village centre was torn down. In the course of administrative restructuring in Rhineland-Palatinate, Reiffelbach was transferred from the Kusel district to the Bad Kreuznach district in 1969. That same year, the church organ was dedicated. In 1970, school grade levels 1 to 4, too, were transferred to Meisenheim, and thereafter the schoolhouse was used as the parish hall. The compulsory-service fire brigade that had been set up in 1921 at last became a volunteer fire brigade in 1971. In 1972, the old schoolhouse was converted into a church hall with kitchen and side rooms. In 1975, a fire brigade promotional association was founded. There was a change in ecclesiastical organization this year, too, one that saw the Evangelical community transferred from the parish of Gangloff to the parish of Odenbach. In 1979, Gangloff was hooked up to the sewage treatment plant in Reiffelbach. In 1981, Reiffelbach was granted the right to bear a coat of arms. The tennis club was founded in 1982. In 1985, a clock was built into the churchtower. In 1987, the village was connected to the Westpfalz (West Palatinate) drinking water supply. Work began in 1990 on a new fire station, and it was dedicated in 1992. In 1993, Reiffelbach celebrated 700 years of existence (at least since the first documentary mention), and a municipal flag was approved for use. Ecclesiastically, Reiffelbach belongs, as it long has, to the Evangelical Church of the Palatinate and the Roman Catholic Diocese of Speyer.

=== Population development ===
Reiffelbach's population development since Napoleonic times is shown in the table below. The figures for the years from 1871 to 1987 are drawn from census data:

Year	Inhabitants
1815	264
1835	339
1871	368
1905	324
1939	279

Year	Inhabitants
1950	326
1961	316
1970	304
1987	258
2005	253

== Religion ==
As at 2 January 2014, there are 236 full-time residents in Reiffelbach, and of those, 154 are Evangelical (65.254%), 46 are Catholic (19.492%), 1 belongs to the Palatinate State Free Religious Community (0.424%), 1 is Russian Orthodox (0.424%), 3 (1.271%) belong to other religious groups and 31 (13.136%) either have no religion or will not reveal their religious affiliation.

== Politics ==
=== Municipal council ===
The council is made up of 6 council members, who were elected by majority vote at the municipal election held on 7 June 2009, and the honorary mayor as chairman.

=== Mayors ===
Listed in the following table are the known heads of the village and municipality of Reiffelbach. Under earlier territorial organizations, the village's leader sometimes bore a subordinate title because the village was part of a greater municipality that itself had a mayor for several villages:

Date	Name	Title
1712	Johann Amman	Gemeindevorsteher (“Municipal Head”)
1765	Jakob Gattel	Gemeindevorsteher
1899–1910	Johann Mathern	Adjunkt
1910–1919	Philipp Gräf	Adjunkt
1919–1920	Jakob Mattern	Adjunkt
1920–1930	Jakob Mattern	Zweiter Bürgermeister (“Second Mayor”)
1930–1931	Johann Maurer	Zweiter Bürgermeister
1931–1933	Jakob Gabbert	Zweiter Bürgermeister
1933–1935	Jakob Zink	Zweiter Bürgermeister
1935–1945	Jakob Zink	Erster Beigeordneter (“First Deputy”)
1945–1946	Alfred Prass	Zweiter Bürgermeister
1946–1948	Fritz Paul	Zweiter Bürgermeister
1948–1954	Fritz Paul	Ortsbeigeordneter (“Village Deputy”)
1956–1964	Gustav Demmel	Ortsbeigeordneter
1964–1970	Ludwig Stibitz	Ortsbeigeordneter
1970–1985	Ludwig Stibitz	Ortsbürgermeister (“Village Mayor”)
1985–1994	Otto Klein	Ortsbürgermeister
1994–2014	Manfred Stibitz	Ortsbürgermeister
2014-	Gerhard Geib	Ortsbürgermeister

=== Coat of arms ===
The municipality's arms might be described thus: Azure a bend sinister wavy argent between an annulet and a trident bendwise sinister, both Or.

The arms have been borne since 1981.

== Culture and sightseeing ==
=== Buildings ===
The following are listed buildings or sites in Rhineland-Palatinate’s Directory of Cultural Monuments:

- Protestant church, Friedhofstraße 8 – Late Classicist aisleless church, 1849
- Glastalstraße 6 – estate complex; post-Baroque building with half-hip roof, about 1800
- Glastalstraße 21 – former mill (?); Baroque building with half-hip roof, quarrystone, 18th century

=== Clubs ===
The following clubs are active in Reiffelbach:

- Frauensingkreis — women's singing circle
- Freiwillige Feuerwehr Reiffelbach — volunteer fire brigade

== Economy and infrastructure ==
=== Transport ===
Reiffelbach lies on Landesstraße 380, which is met in the village centre by Kreisstraße 75. Landesstraße 380 leads northwards towards Callbach where it links with Bundesstraße 420, whence it is a very short drive into Meisenheim. Kreisstraße 75 leads westwards to Odenbach, becoming Kreisstraße 51 when it crosses into the Kusel district. This also links with Bundesstraße 420. Serving Staudernheim is a railway station on the Nahe Valley Railway (Bingen–Saarbrücken). The railway running through nearby Meisenheim is nowadays only used for recreational draisine touring.

=== Public institutions ===
Reiffelbach has a parish hall, a grilling pavilion with a festival hall, a graveyard and a church community.
