= Medard =

- Municipality
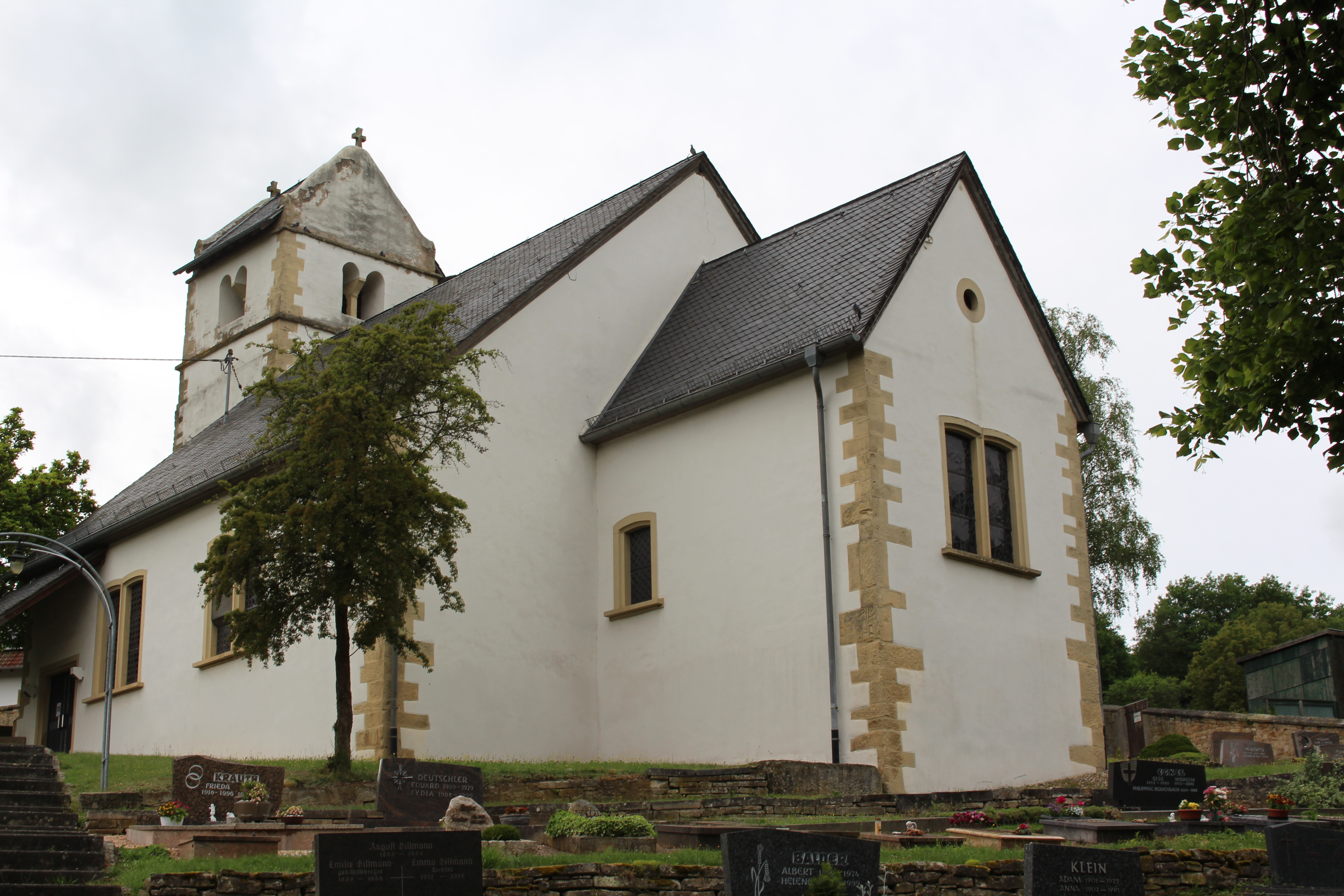
- protestant church

- Coat of arms

- Location of Medard within Kusel district
- Interactive map of Medard
- Location within Germany Location within Rhineland-Palatinate
- Coordinates: 49°40′5″N 7°36′52″E
- Country: Germany
- State: Rhineland-Palatinate
- District: Kusel
- Municipal assoc.: Lauterecken-Wolfstein

Government
  - Mayor (2019–24): Albert Graf

Area
  - Total: 5.99 km^{2} (2.31 sq mi)
- Elevation: 270 m (890 ft)

Population (2025-12-31)
  - Total: 466
  - Density: 77.8/km^{2} (201/sq mi)
- Time zone: UTC+01:00 (CET)
  - Summer (DST): UTC+02:00 (CEST)
- Postal codes: 67744
- Dialling codes: 06382
- Vehicle registration: KUS

Medard (German pronunciation: [ˈmeːdaʀt]) is an Ortsgemeinde – a municipality belonging to a Verbandsgemeinde, a kind of collective municipality – in the Kusel district in Rhineland-Palatinate, Germany. It belongs to the Verbandsgemeinde Lauterecken-Wolfstein.

== Geography ==
=== Location ===
The municipality lies on the river Glan in the Western Palatinate at an elevation of some 160 m above sea level, mainly on the river's left bank for a stretch of about a kilometre towards the northeast. The elevations around the village reach heights of roughly 300 m above sea level (Ohlbachskopf 316 m, Marialskopf 290 m). The municipal area measures 599 ha, of which roughly 25 ha is settled and 138 ha is wooded. The village is surrounded by slopes with meadow orchards. From Medard, outings for hikers and canoeists are possible.

=== Neighbouring municipalities ===
Medard borders in the north on the municipality of Breitenheim, in the east on the municipality of Odenbach, in the southeast on the municipality of Cronenberg, in the southwest and west on the town of Lauterecken, in the west on an exclave belonging to the municipality of Grumbach and in the northwest on the municipality of Kappeln.

=== Constituent communities ===
Also belonging to Medard is the outlying homestead of Bärenhof.

=== Municipality’s layout ===
Most of Medard's houses are found standing either side of the through road, Bundesstraße 420, branching off which are smaller sidestreets. The most important of these branching off to the south are a street leading to the former railway station and another leading to the former mill. In the area around the mill, nowadays known as Medardusquelle (“Saint Medardus’s Spring”), a bridge crosses the river Glan, which leads to the few houses that stand on the river's right bank, and also to the sporting ground and to lands used for agriculture and forestry. Here on the right bank, two shaft kilns for making quicklime, in operation between 1820 and 1900, are preserved. The pretty old village church in the middle of the graveyard, the former school and the former Roman archaeological dig sites lie at the ends of the sidestreets that branch off the through road to the north. Here, too, a great new building zone spreads out. A very old gymnasium stands on the through road. Houses in the village core are as a rule simple houses, but there are also Einfirstbauernhäuser (farmhouses with single roof ridges), which are typical of the Westrich, an historic region that encompasses areas in both Germany and France. The inn and hotel of the Bärenhof stands at the side of the road leading to Odenbach and Meisenheim left of Bundesstraße 420. Once found in this area was a knacker’s yard. Medard was once also noted for its great number of houses with crow-stepped gables, of which nowadays only a single example is preserved; it stands on Mühlenstraße.

== History ==
=== Antiquity ===
The municipality of Medard has yielded a wealth of archaeological finds from prehistoric and Roman times. The Marialskopf in the southeast was in the time when the area was settled by the Celts ringed by walls and palisades, a refuge castle. The remnants of this settlement within the ringwall can still clearly be seen. In 1973 and 1983, archaeological digs unearthed and secured potsherds from vessels made by the Hunsrück-Eifel Culture. Significant was the recovery of a silver coin struck in Pannonia, a quarter-stater with Zeus’s head on the obverse and an image of a rider on the reverse. Splinters and shards of old ceramic vessels are still to be found on those lands today. It is likely that the Celtic settlement remained once the Romans had conquered Gaul. Near Medard’s mediaeval church, foundations from a settlement built in Gallo-Roman times were discovered in 1973. It turned out to be a villa rustica from the turn of the 4th century AD. In 1979, 1980 and 1984, under Diethelm Malitius’s leadership, some outbuildings were also partly unearthed. The archaeologists also discovered fragments of sculptures, one showing a female figure, grapevine shoots and a horn of plenty full of fruits. In the Middle Ages, it is likely that many stone reliefs still lay all around in the ground, perhaps explaining the spolia from Roman times that can still be seen in the church walls today, showing such things as grapes and another female figure. Taken out of the church’s walling were the fragments of a relief that shows Medea on a wain drawn by snakes. Of Medea’s children, whom she killed out of jealousy, only the lower part of a boy’s body can still be seen. The image’s background shows her unfaithful husband, Jason. The relief was supposedly once part of a grave monument. During renovation work on the church, three sandstone blocks from Roman times were discovered near the portal in 1988, of which one was originally used as an ossuary (repository for bone ash). One side of this stone bears a well-preserved inscription that reads “[D M (for Dis Manibus)] ... us Ammosus et Amandia Mandina Conjux Regulo filio [su]orum et suo vivi fecer[unt]”, or in English, “...us Ammosus and his wife Amandia Mandina set [this grave monument] to their son Regulus and themselves to their lifetime.” The digs at the Roman settlement site resumed very extensively in 1995 and 1996 under Wolfgang Heinzelmann’s leadership on assignment from the Alt-Medard (“Old Medard”) Promotional Association and the State Office for Monument Care. This work fully brought to light the former Roman settlement's main house, the atrium house, together with other structures built up around it and the villa's girding wall. It was apparently a great, certainly two-floor building with corner risalti at the front, of which one could be heated by a hypocaust facility. The house's footprint measured 30 m in length and 20 m in breadth. The archaeologists found a column fragment, remnants of flooring and plastering in Pompeian red. A bathing facility was only partially unearthed, but a drainage ditch was fully dug up, revealing a further series of single finds. All together, three different building periods were identified. It is presumed that this great villa rustica with its many outbuildings covered an area of some 3 ha. It may therefore be that this Roman estate unearthed on Medard's outskirts is by far the biggest that has ever come to light in the whole Western Palatinate. To preserve them, the digs have once more been filled with earth.

=== Middle Ages ===
The Gallo-Roman settlement near today's village may have vanished in the 5th century. The archaeological discoveries suggest that there was an epoch during which the area was not settled, but it was quite soon that more settlers came and founded another settlement. Nevertheless, it is unknown just when this village was founded. Indeed, during the digs at the villa rustica, the archaeologists also found the outlines of six small pit-houses from the Middle Ages. It is to be assumed that the village's first houses arose very early after the Franks took the land, on the mountainside, likely near a wooden church. The pit-houses that were unearthed, going by what is known about such things by archaeology, likely date from the 10th or 11th century. They must not have been the oldest buildings from the time of post-Roman settlement. Originally, the estate of Medard lay in the Free Königsland, but was given by a Merovingian king into the ownership of the Bishops of Verdun, although it is unknown when this donation happened. The Counts of Veldenz as successors to the Counts of the Nahegau founded out of their own small holdings and out of extensive territories that they safeguarded as Vögte belonging to the Bishoprics of Mainz, Worms, Verdun and Reims their new county, the County of Veldenz. In a 1235 document, the fiefs held by the Counts of Veldenz from the Bishops of Verdun were listed: Veldenz, Medard, Baumholder, Wolfersweiler, Freisen, Sankt Wendel, Tholey and Neunkirchen an der Nahe. Since Medard is named right after Veldenz, the estate might have been of special importance to Verdun. Bit by bit, the Counts of Veldenz managed to suppress the influence wielded by the Bishops of Verdun. The Counts lent them knights with official duties, and also with benefices and rights from Verdun holdings, and thus also with rights from Saint Medardus’s Estate (Medard). In the applicable enfeoffment documents, until the mid 14th century, a note appeared stating that the enfeoffment's origin was Verdun, but by the late 14th century, this note was being left out, leading to the conclusion that by this time, Verdun's ownership rights no longer meant very much. Nevertheless, the Bishopric of Verdun remained the landholder, which could be clearly seen whenever a new prince took power or a new bishop was installed. When the last Count of Veldenz died in 1444, the Bishops of Verdun held the Vogtei of the Counts of Veldenz to be extinct along with the Counts, and no longer wanted to recognize Stephen, Count Palatine of Simmern-Zweibrücken as their rightful successor. However, Archbishop of Trier Jacob managed to negotiate the reinstatement of the original arrangement in 1454. The feudal arrangement between Verdun and Veldenz was then confirmed in 1497 by Emperor Maximilian I. Until about 1000, the estate of Medard, along with Meisenheim and Lauterecken, were held to be the more important centres in the Glan valley. Bit by bit, it was outstripped in importance by the two other centres, which later became towns. Lauterecken arose only about 1000 at a castle and was likely granted town rights in 1349. Meisenheim, which was a town as of 1315, was also raised as early as the 12th century to residence town by the Counts of Veldenz. Between 1124 and 1444, Medard lay in the County of Veldenz, within which it belonged to the Oberamt of Meisenheim. After the Counts died out in 1444, it belonged to Count Palatine Stephen.

=== Modern times ===
In 1509 a lord was once again enfeoffed with Medard, this time Alexander, Count Palatine of Zweibrücken, by the Bishopric Administrator Nikolaus von Verdun. The Bishop of Verdun at that time, Prince Louis of Lorraine, was only nine years old and thus could not undertake the deed himself. What clearly showed that this was nothing more than a symbolic deed anyway was Verdun's utter lack of influence when in 1537, Wolfgang, Count Palatine of Zweibrücken chose to introduce the Reformation into their domains. During the Thirty Years' War, Medard suffered not only under the ravages of war but also under the Plague, though the loss of life was not as great as it was in the area around Kusel, for the inhabitants managed in the main to shelter themselves within Meisenheim’s town walls. The Amt seat of Meisenheim was never overrun by troops coming through the area. The loss of life was nevertheless great enough, and after the war, resettlement began. It may well have been in this time that the dale first began to be settled in the Medard area. From 1589 comes a report of a long dispute over grazing rights between Medard and Lauterecken, which had since become “foreign”. It is also highly likely that Medard was destroyed during French King Louis XIV's wars of conquest. France tried using military force beginning in 1672 and through its politique des Réunions beginning in 1679 to win back such areas within Germany as were in one way or another still tied to France. Within today's Kusel district, de jure relations with Verdun in Lorraine barely still existed in the estate of Medard, which by now found itself in the Unteramt of Odenbach. On Lorraine, too, France raised a claim, and the duchy was annexed to France in 1766. The then Count Palatine of Zweibrücken Friedrich Ludwig, and also Leopold Ludwig, the last Count Palatine of Veldenz-Lützelstein who kept his residence in Lauterecken, opposed the French attempts at Réunion. The French showed their displeasure at this by burning many places in the two counties palatine down, in 1677 the town of Kusel and in 1680 Castle Veldenz. It is unknown today in what way Medard, too, suffered in the warfare of that time. Meanwhile, after the destruction, the French were promoting the settling of newcomers and the reintroduction and spread of the Catholic faith. The County Palatine of Veldenz mentioned above had been established by the 1543 Treaty of Marburg. Under its terms, a border had also arisen between Medard and the neighbouring town of Lauterecken, for Medard had not been included in the new county palatine, but rather had remained in the Oberamt of Meisenheim in the County Palatine of Zweibrücken. What is odd is that in 1653, Count Palatine Leopold Ludwig had the Bishop of Verdun enfeoff him with not only Veldenz, which belonged to this new county palatine, but also Medard, Baumholder and Wolfersweiler. Since the last three named places remained with the County Palatine of Zweibrücken, it seems that this enfeoffment was never operative. On the other hand, the feudal arrangement between Verdun and its landholders remained in force until the French Revolution.

==== Recent times ====
During the time of the French Revolution and the Napoleonic era that followed, the German lands on the Rhine’s left bank were annexed by France. With the new political arrangement and within the new boundaries, Medard found itself in the Mairie (“Mayoralty”) of Meisenheim, the Canton of Meisenheim, the Arrondissement of Birkenfeld and the Department of Sarre. After French rule, the Congress of Vienna drew new boundaries yet again. Between the Glan and the Nahe arose the Principality of Lichtenberg, a newly created exclave of the Duchy of Saxe-Coburg-Saalfeld, and the Oberamt of Meisenheim belonging to the Landgraviate of Hesse-Homburg. Medard now lay within this Meisenheim body, whereas its neighbours on the Glan's right bank, Lauterecken and Odenbach, had been grouped into the bayerischer Rheinkreis, later known as Rheinpfalz (“Rhenish Palatinate”), an exclave of the Kingdom of Bavaria. The whole Landgraviate of Hesse-Homburg passed after the last Prince's death in 1866 to the Kingdom of Prussia, and what had hitherto been the Oberamt of Meisenheim now became the Landkreis (district) of Meisenheim within Prussia's Rhine Province. This district was merged into the Bad Kreuznach district in 1932. In the 19th century, the Glantalbahn (railway) ran through the village. There were further changes after the Second World War. At first, Medard still lay in the Bad Kreuznach district within the Regierungsbezirk of Koblenz in the then newly founded state of Rhineland-Palatinate. In the course of administrative restructuring in 1968 the village was split away from the Bad Kreuznach district and grouped into the Kusel district, and in 1972 into the newly founded Verbandsgemeinde of Lauterecken. At the same time, it was transferred from the Regierungsbezirk of Koblenz to the Regierungsbezirk of Rheinhessen-Pfalz, which was then also newly founded, but which has now been dissolved.

=== Population development ===
The village of Medard has remained rurally structured to this day. A great part of the populace earned its living until a few decades ago at agriculture. Alongside farmers were the local craftsmen, as well as workers and employees who mostly sought work elsewhere. Agriculture now employs few people. Many people in the workforce nowadays earn livelihoods outside the village.

The following table shows population development for Medard, although figures from long ago are not available:

| Year | 1978 | 1999 | 2007 |
| Total | 540 | 470 | 519 |

=== Municipality’s name ===
The village's namesake is Saint Medardus, the original patron of the Church of Medard. Medardus, from Salency in France (also Saint Gildard’s birthplace), dedicated himself as a son of well-to-do parents to the poor, for whom he gave his whole fortune. He was later a bishop in Vermandois and Tournai, and died about 560. He was thus Saint Remigius’s contemporary. The original estate of Medard was said to be a base of the Bishopric of Verdun, and it was also described in the oldest known documents as an estate. In an 1150 document, surviving today in an 1156 copy, appears the transcription “in Curiam sancti Medardi”. Among other forms of the name that have appeared over the ages are de Sancto Medardo (1223), Curtis S. Medardi (1235), apud Sanctum Mydehardum (1289) and Sant Medhard (1343). It could be that an earlier name for the village was displaced by the church patron’s name. The name once bore the tag Sankt (“Saint”), but this was dropped in the Reformation.

=== Vanished villages ===
For the Medard area, three vanished villages are known by name, Rode, Schwanden and Nirthausen (also called Nordhausen and Erdhausen). Rode lay north of Medard and Schwanden northeast, while Nirthausen lay somewhere between Medard and Lauterecken. Rode and Schwanden were named in documents in 1289, 1379 and 1380, in each of which the name form Swande was used for the latter. Both names mean “clearing”. Both villages (or farms, as the case might have been) may have been given up even long before the Thirty Years' War. Nirthausen was mentioned, among other times, in 1377 as Nyrthusen, in 1387 as Nyrthuißen and in 1643 as Nörthausen. The rural cadastral toponym Erdhausen, still used today, can be traced back to Nirthausen. Unlike the other two, Nirthausen was still standing at the time of the Thirty Years' War, but was likely not settled by either its original inhabitants or newcomers after that war. Researchers Dolch and Greule trace the first part of the name, Nirt—, back to a man named Nerito. According to this theory, a man named Nerito founded the village. Just where this village stood is a matter of some disagreement, and some even assign it to a neighbouring municipality.

== Religion ==
It is assumed that Medard was founded at the time of the Frankish taking of the land, making it one of the oldest villages founded by settlers coming along the Roman roads running through the Glan valley. The area in which the founding came about must have belonged to the Free Imperial Domain (Reichsland), for only thus could the estate of Medard have become a donation to the Bishop of Verdun. Therefore, the village's founding could have come about as early as the early 6th century, and it is quite possible that efforts to Christianize the Germanic peoples had their roots here. That would have necessitated a church in the village right from the beginning. The villages that later belonged to the parish of the estate of Medard must all have been founded somewhat later; a time period of 200 to 400 years can be assumed for that. These villages’ names only became known to history very late. They were, besides Medard itself, Windsberg (today Windhof), Lauterecken, Berschweiler (today a constituent community of Wiesweiler), Lohnweiler, Adenbach, Becherbach, Odenbach and the now vanished villages of Nyrthausen, Mannweiler (near Reipoltskirchen), Rode and Schwanden. To be borne in mind is that under secular organization during the Middle Ages, Odenbach had become an Unteramt seat, and that this Unteramt and the parish were coëxtensive. While Medard was a Verdun landhold, it nevertheless belonged under ecclesiastical organization to the Archbishopric of Mainz. The church that stands today – or at least the churchtower – has its roots in the 13th century. The triple nave was only built in the 16th century. The quire was a renovation job done in 1890. The Reformation was introduced in 1537 in line with ecclesiastical developments introduced by Wolfgang, Count Palatine of Zweibrücken, who at first adopted the Lutheran faith. However, beginning in 1588, Count Palatine Johannes I forced all his subjects to convert to Reformed belief as espoused by John Calvin. The church stewardship responsible for Medard at that time was the one at Meisenheim. Changes came both to the parish and the secular organization at the time when the new County Palatine of Veldenz was founded under the terms of the 1543 Treaty of Marburg. At this time, Lauterecken, Berschweiler and Lohnweiler were grouped into the new county palatine, which would affect the new consolidation within the parish only bit by bit. From 1367, the parish branch village of Odenbach already had its own church. In 1675, Medard lost its function as mother church and itself became a branch of Odenbach. The new political order brought by the French Revolution and Napoleonic French rule also brought fundamental changes in ecclesiastical organization. Under Hesse-Homburg sovereignty, Medard was split away from Odenbach and grouped into the parish of Meisenheim. For a time, the rector of the Meisenheim Latin school was also the clergyman in Medard. Only in 1902, long after Medard had passed to Prussia, did Medard once again find itself at the hub of its own parish. In 1902 and 1903, the rectory that still stands now was also built. From 1866, the Meisenheim district also formed its own church district. This was dissolved in 1969 and merged with the likewise former church districts of Kreuznach and Sobernheim into a new church district known as “An Nahe und Glan”. Belonging to this was the parish of Medard, but only for a short time, for in 1976, it was grouped into the Sankt Wendel church district. Since 1991, the minister at Medard has had two parishes to tend, his own and the small parish of Niederalben, which lies 15 km away.

== Politics ==
=== Municipal council ===
The council is made up of 12 council members, who were elected by majority vote at the municipal election held on 7 June 2009, and the honorary mayor as chairman.

=== Mayor ===
Medard's mayor is Albert Graf, and his deputies are Hans Knaul and Stefan Hoos.

=== Coat of arms ===
The municipality's arms might in English heraldic language be described thus: Per bend sinister azure a church chancel foremost Or and argent Saint Medardus proper vested of the first, mitred Or and bearing a staff of the same in the dexter hand a book of the same in the sinister.

The charge on the dexter (armsbearer's right, viewer's left) side is the local church, and the tinctures, blue and gold, are those borne by the Bishopric of Verdun, for the area was donated to the Bishop of Verdun sometime between 575 and 588. The charge on the sinister (armsbearer's left, viewer's right) side is the municipality's patron saint, Medardus, who is also the village's namesake. He is shown as a bishop, which is also a reference to the village's former allegiance to the Bishopric of Verdun, dating back to the Early Middle Ages. The tinctures on this side are the ones once borne by the Counts of Veldenz, who held the village for centuries. The arms have been borne since 4 November 1985.

== Culture and sightseeing ==
=== Buildings ===
The following are listed buildings or sites in Rhineland-Palatinate’s Directory of Cultural Monuments:

- Evangelical parish church, Kirchgasse 8 – nave and rectangular quire, about 1262, west tower completed late 13th century, aisles possibly about 1510, renovation 1592–1597; Roman spolia, possibly early 3rd century; at the graveyard sarcophagi, about 1000 (see also below)
- Near Hauptstraße 18 – former flowing well, sandstone-block, cast-iron basin, 19th century; remnants of the wooden waterpipe
- Hauptstraße 26 – former school; sandstone-framed plastered building, 1844; barn from time of building; characterizes village's appearance
- Kirchgasse 3 – Evangelical rectory; villalike cube-shaped building with hipped roof with risalti and timber-frame gables, 1903; characterizes square's appearance
- Near Mühlgasse 20 – former shaft kiln of the limeworks of the firm C. und L. Schlemmer; three-level, regenerative flue, 1922
- Mühlgasse 30 – house with crow-stepped gable, partly timber-frame (plastered), 16th century, stable-barn, possibly from the 19th century
- former shaft kilns, in the Scheiderwald (woods) at municipal limits with Cronenberg – two sandstone-block hoppers integrated into the slope, 1820

==== Evangelical church ====
The Romanesque church in the village is nowadays Evangelical. It stands on the site where it is believed once stood a chapel. Inside the quire arch are the two yeardates 1262 and 1597. The tower and parts of the nave are known with certainty to be older than even the earlier of those dates. Many times, alterations were made to the church, especially in the years from 1592 to 1597. Perhaps it was then that the two aisles were added. It is also believed that it was then that two columns were removed from each of the nave's side walls to make the building into what is held in the Reformed tradition to be a church suited to sermons (Predigtkirche). By 1887, the quire had fallen into disrepair and was torn down and replaced with a new one.

=== Regular events ===
Medard holds its kermis (church consecration festival) on the second weekend in September. Other than what is also practised in neighbouring villages, there are no customs peculiar to Medard.

=== Clubs ===
The following clubs are active in Medard:

- Angelsportverein — angling club
- Förderverein der Feuerwehr — fire brigade promotional association
- Landfrauenverein — countrywomen's club
- Männergesangverein — men's singing club
- Modellflugverein „Falke“ — model aircraft club
- Sportverein — sport club

== Economy and infrastructure ==
=== Economic structure ===
In the beginning, the villagers of Medard earned their livelihoods mainly by working the land. Alongside smaller handicraft businesses was a mill, and limestone was long mined here, and fired into quicklime. Two limekilns of the shaft variety still stand today. A mineral spring has long been known, and in the former mill's buildings is used for mineral water production in grand style (“Medardus-Quelle”). A business that marketed ceramic ware set up shop in the village after the Second World War, but ceased production a few years ago. A major metal construction firm that makes window and door structures went into production in January 2000 on the road leading to Lauterecken. All together, the businesses in the village fall far short of employing the whole available workforce, and thus many must commute to jobs elsewhere, mainly to Lauterecken, Meisenheim, Kaiserslautern and Bad Kreuznach. All together, the tourism sector in the village still has room to grow.

=== Education ===
Originally, Medard schoolchildren had to go to school in Odenbach, for which the Medard clergyman donated one Malter of corn. In 1596, the clergyman declared himself ready to teach classes himself, thereby sparing himself the corn payment. In 1604, a man named Jost Drincker, at the same time a teacher in the Eßweiler Tal (dale), was supposed to be hired as a “German schoolmaster” in Medard. It seems likely that Drincker only taught in Medard sporadically, for a 1609 school inspection in Medard noted that no school was to be found there. It is unknown when school started back up. In 1623, a schoolteacher named Johannes Walmeister came to Medard, who sought in vain in 1626 to have himself transferred to the Amt of Lichtenberg because the people in Medard were too poor to send their children to school. A setback for schooling came with the Thirty Years' War, but the teaching post was soon filled after the war. In 1655, seven years after the war ended, a schoolmaster complained that children were not coming to school regularly and that he was not getting his full salary. This teacher had himself transferred, ushering in a long time during which there was no school. Further school inspections in 1666 and 1673 also noted that no school was to be found in Medard. Parents who were interested in sending their children to school were now once again forced to turn to Odenbach. In 1674, though, Medard once again had a schoolteacher; however, he soon left the village again because he was not being paid enough. In 1687, the teaching post in Medard was newly filled, and the teacher at that time was given a good reference. In 1695, Hans Konrad Henn was the schoolteacher. In 1708, it was Johann Rudolf Roland, who in 1714 was transferred to Rehborn. Following him was Kaspar Methiger, who in 1722 went to Ulmet. Then came Balthasar Nikolay, earlier the schoolteacher in Einöllen. He taught in the village for 31 years and in 1753, when he was 75, asked that his son-in-law be hired, who for a while taught 50 children. He then taught until 1791, and in turn he was followed by his own son-in-law, Johannes Hunsicker from Jeckenbach. About this schoolteacher it was reported that he possessed “besides the knowledge of educational sciences, the calling of a great artist in fabricating musical instruments”. The musical instruments built by Hunsicker, mainly pianos, were even sold abroad, and thus he was in a better financial position than other teachers. Hunsicker's income from the municipality then amounted to 18 Rhenish guilders, 12 Batzen and 8 Pfennige. Today, primary school pupils and Hauptschule students attend their respective schools in Lauterecken. There are Gymnasien in Lauterecken and Meisenheim. The nearest university town is Kaiserslautern (Kaiserslautern University of Technology).

=== Transport ===
Medard lies on Bundesstraße 420 (Oppenheim—Neunkirchen, Saarland). In Lauterecken, only 2 km away, Bundesstraßen 420 and 270 cross each other. The nearest Autobahn interchanges are all rather far away (Kusel 32 km, Kaiserslautern 35 km, Wörrstadt 45 km). Formerly, the village lay on the Glan Valley Railway (Glantalbahn, Bad Münster am Stein—Homburg), which opened in 1906 and closed in 1985. Running nowadays on the railway right-of-way are small draisines as a tourist attraction. Serving Lauterecken is a railway station on the Lauter Valley Railway (Lautertalbahn).

== Famous people ==
=== Sons and daughters of the town ===
Karl L. Kistner (b. 1926) — A painter, graphic artist and writer, Kistner has had many exhibitions throughout Germany. A well known work of his is Die Bibel in 61 Linolschnitten (“The Bible in 61 Linocuts”). Among other things that he has published are Autoleien, Jeden Tag ein Lächeln (“Every Day a Smile”) and Liebesbriefe (“Love Letters”).
