= Callbach =

- Municipality
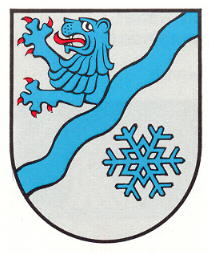
- Coat of arms

- Location of Callbach within Bad Kreuznach district
- Interactive map of Callbach
- Location within Germany Location within Rhineland-Palatinate
- Coordinates: 49°42′13″N 7°41′57″E
- Country: Germany
- State: Rhineland-Palatinate
- District: Bad Kreuznach
- Municipal assoc.: Nahe-Glan

Government
  - Mayor (2019–24): Uwe Mauritz

Area
  - Total: 5.38 km^{2} (2.08 sq mi)
- Elevation: 223 m (732 ft)

Population (2025-12-31)
  - Total: 344
  - Density: 63.9/km^{2} (166/sq mi)
- Time zone: UTC+01:00 (CET)
  - Summer (DST): UTC+02:00 (CEST)
- Postal codes: 67829
- Dialling codes: 06753
- Vehicle registration: KH

Callbach (German pronunciation: [ˈkalbax]) is a municipality in the Bad Kreuznach district in Rhineland-Palatinate, Germany. It belongs to the Verbandsgemeinde Nahe-Glan.

== Geography ==
=== Location ===
Callbach is a linear village (by some definitions, a “thorpe”) that lies in the North Palatine Uplands at the Eschelbach valley, a side dale of the Glan.

=== Neighbouring municipalities ===
Clockwise from the north, Callbach's neighbours are the municipalities of Rehborn, Unkenbach, Finkenbach-Gersweiler (both in the neighbouring Donnersbergkreis), Schmittweiler, Reiffelbach and the town of Meisenheim.

=== Constituent communities ===
Also belonging to Callbach is the outlying homestead of Lindenhof.

== History ==
After the Congress of Vienna, which about 1815 and the years that followed imposed a new political landscape on the region after Napoleonic French rule had ended, Callbach belonged to the Rheinkreis along with much of the Palatinate, a new exclave of the Kingdom of Bavaria. It remained Bavarian until the end of the Second World War, since which time it has been part of the then newly founded state of Rhineland-Palatinate. In the course of administrative restructuring in this state in 1969, Callbach was transferred from the former Rockenhausen district (which was at the same time dissolved) to the Bad Kreuznach district, in which it still finds itself now. From an ecclesiastical standpoint, Callbach has long belonged to the Evangelical Church of the Palatinate (Protestant) and to the Roman Catholic Diocese of Speyer.

=== Population development ===
Callbach's population development since Napoleonic times is shown in the table below. The figures for the years from 1871 to 1987 are drawn from census data:

Year	Inhabitants
1815	391
1835	556
1871	580
1905	594
1939	540

Year	Inhabitants
1950	541
1961	540
1970	540
1987	423
2005	419

== Religion ==
As at 31 August 2013, there are 386 full-time residents in Callbach, and of those, 313 are Evangelical (81.088%), 25 are Catholic (6.477%), 2 (0.518%) belong to other religious groups and 46 (11.917%) either have no religion or will not reveal their religious affiliation.

== Politics ==
=== Municipal council ===
The council is made up of 8 council members, who were elected by majority vote at the municipal election held on 7 June 2009, and the honorary mayor as chairman.

=== Mayor ===
Callbach's mayor is Uwe Mauritz.

=== Coat of arms ===
The municipality's arms might be described thus: Argent a bend sinister wavy azure issuant therefrom in dexter chief a demilion of the same armed and langued gules, in sinister base a snowflake of the second.

The charge on the dexter (armsbearer's right, viewer's left) side, the “demilion” (“half lion”), is an heraldic device formerly borne by the Counts of Veldenz, Callbach's mediaeval landholders. The other elements in the composition are canting for the village's original name, Kaltenbach, which meant “cold brook”. The bend sinister wavy (slanted wavy stripe) stands for a brook, and the snowflake symbolizes coldness. The arms have been borne since 9 November 1981.

== Culture and sightseeing ==
=== Buildings ===
The following are listed buildings or sites in Rhineland-Palatinate’s Directory of Cultural Monuments:

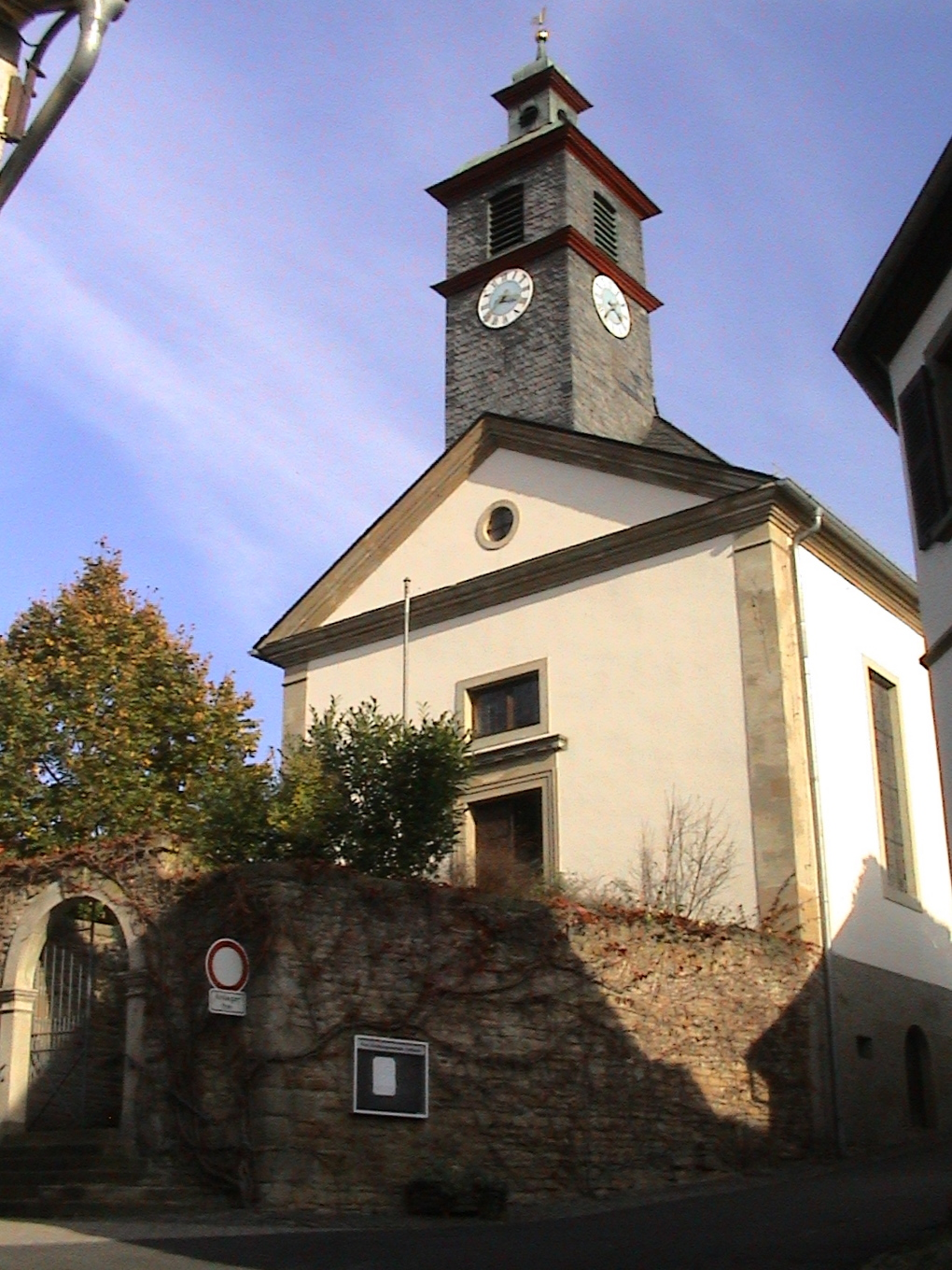
Kirchstraße 17 – Evangelical parish church

- Evangelical church, Kirchstraße 17 – Classicist aisleless church, marked 1780 and 1781, architect Friedrich Gerhard Wahl (see also below)
- Hauptstraße 34 – estate complex; Late Baroque Einfirsthaus (“house with single roof ridge”), marked 1790 and 1791
- Im Hof 2 – house, plastered building, essentially perhaps from the 16th or 17th century
- Schmittweilerstraße 1 – estate complex along the street; essentially Baroque house, marked 17?0 and 1802, barn, partly timber-frame, possibly from the 18th or early 19th century

=== Church ===
Callbach's church was first built in 1334, but over the course of history it has several times been destroyed and then built over again. In 1782, after a third reconstruction by the Ducal Zweibrücken Building Director Friedrich Gerhard Wahl, the aisleless church assumed its current shape. Held at the church are services of the Evangelical faith, whose members make up a majority of some 80% in the village. The rectangular building rises on a slope overlooking Kirchstraße (“Church Street”), and access thereto is gained by way of a stairway up to a portal. Because of the sloped site, the church is underpinned in part by a simple vaulted cellar. The cellar's façade towards the street is faced with sandstone blocks. The building as a whole follows the east-west orientation that is traditionally typical of church buildings. The monochromatically white plastered façade with its shaped elements in the Classicist style is framed by corner lesenes made of natural stone. The portal and the windows along the middle axis and a gable with a round window accentuate this straight-lined entrance façade. Beginning in 1993, the church – which is a parish church – was renovated in two phases. The exterior was done in 1993-1995, while the interior was done in 1998-1999. The overhaul and conversion brought into existence a newly structured multifunctional space inside the church. The inside, with its new colour scheme, now also offers rooms that may be used for various functions and purposes. The new spatial concept made it necessary to rearrange the seating and the original lateral alignment to the altar and the pulpit along the aisleless church's side wall. The stone slabs on the church floor with their signs of wear, the pews and the simple wooden table altar were overhauled and restored. A sandstone stele with a gilt baptismal font made according to current designs completes the church's furnishings. The building-in of a kitchenette, chair storage, a lavatory facility and rooms with movable walls allow the parishioners to arrange the space for the most varied of occasions. Besides the church services and liturgical exercises, the church is also used for meetings and cultural events.

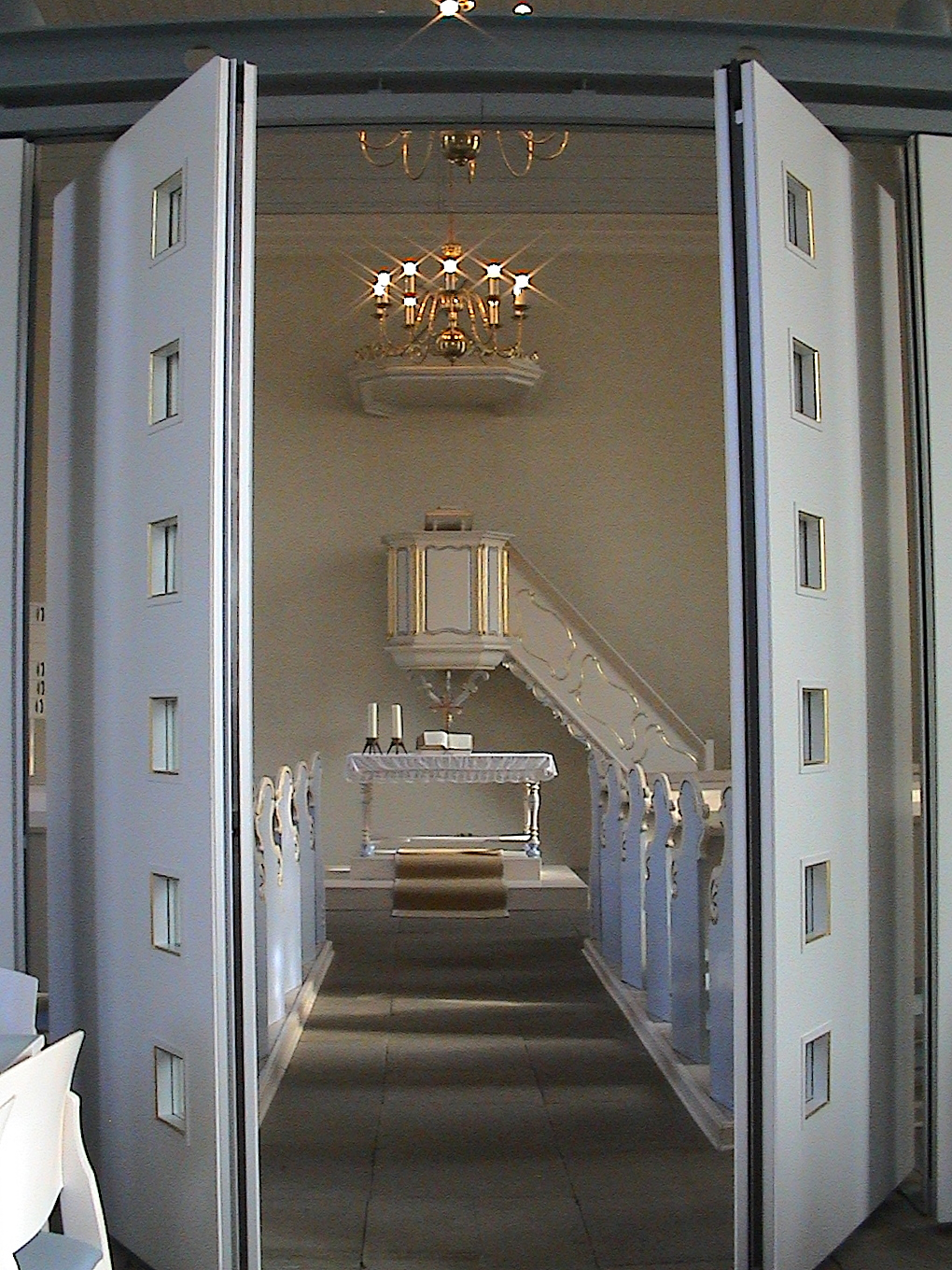
View through movable wall

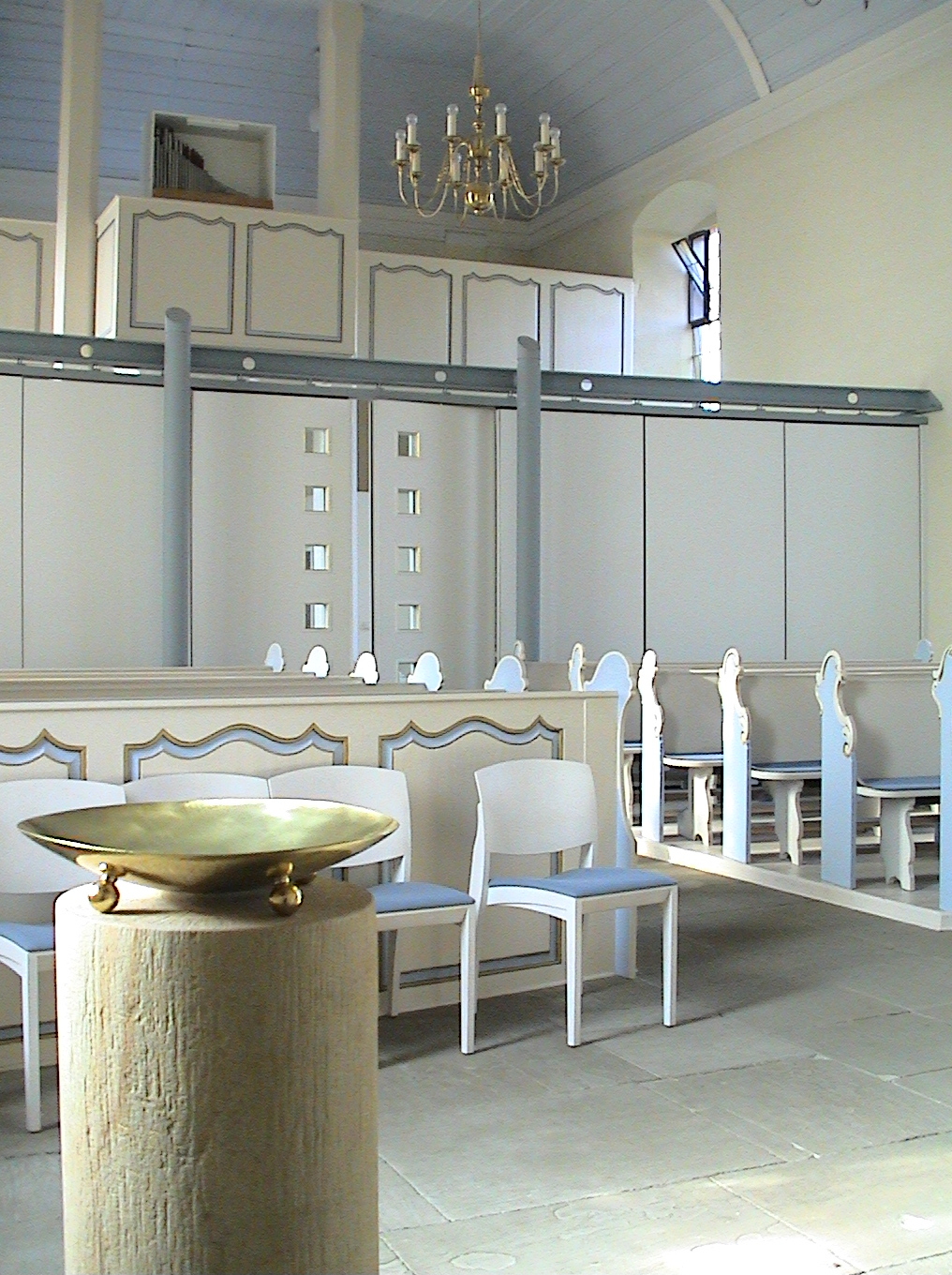
Usual venue for services

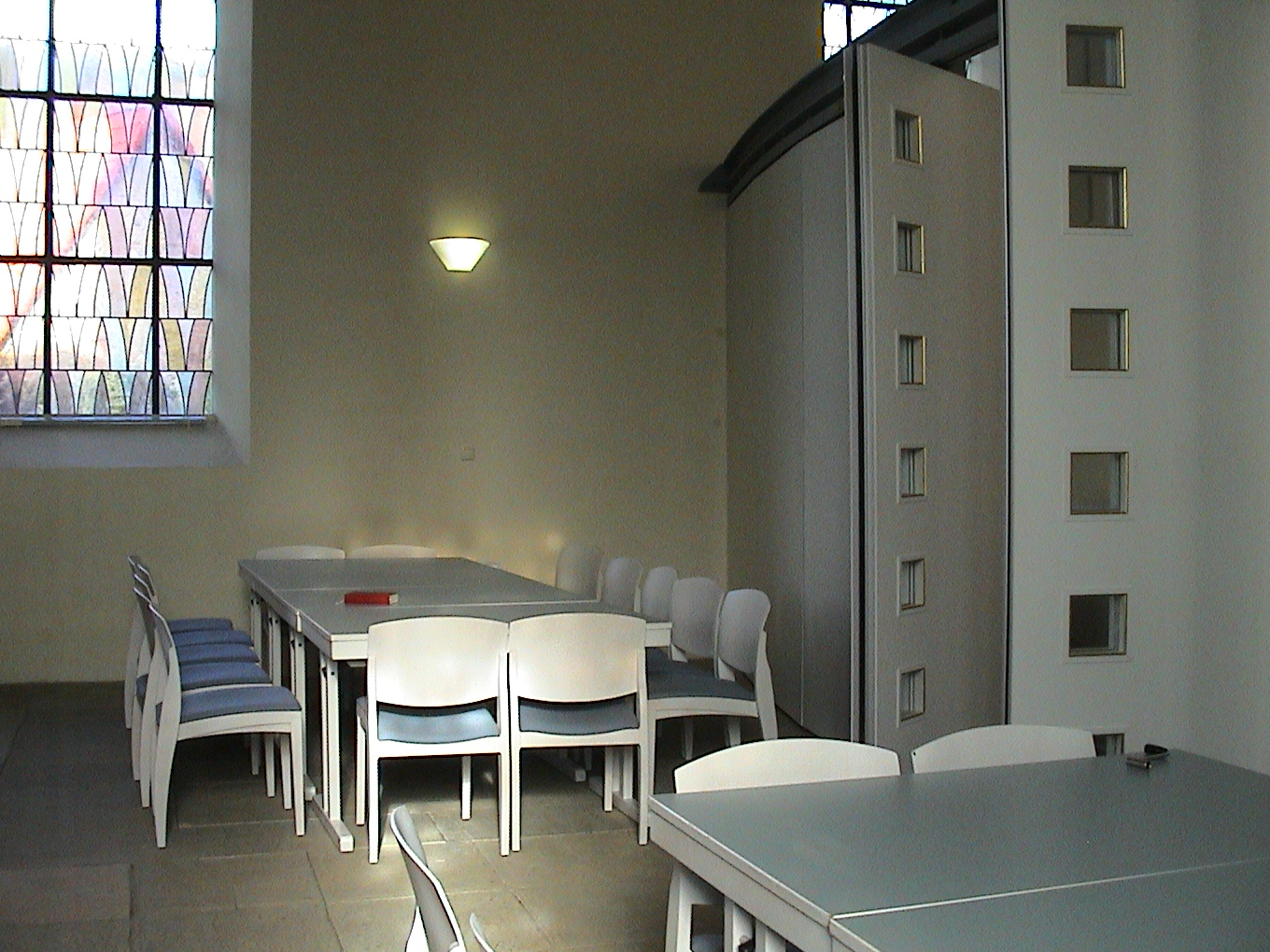
Gathering room with variable seating

== Economy and infrastructure ==
=== Transport ===
Running through the village is Bundesstraße 420. Serving Staudernheim is a railway station on the Nahe Valley Railway (Bingen–Saarbrücken).
