= Becherbach (Bad Kreuznach) =

- Municipality
- Coat of arms

- Location of Becherbach within Bad Kreuznach district
- Interactive map of Becherbach
- Location within Germany Location within Rhineland-Palatinate
- Coordinates: 49°39′20″N 07°40′48″E
- Country: Germany
- State: Rhineland-Palatinate
- District: Bad Kreuznach
- Municipal assoc.: Nahe-Glan
- Subdivisions: 3

Government
  - Mayor (2019–24): Manfred Denzer

Area
  - Total: 10.85 km^{2} (4.19 sq mi)
- Elevation: 337 m (1,106 ft)

Population (2025-12-31)
  - Total: 843
  - Density: 77.7/km^{2} (201/sq mi)
- Time zone: UTC+01:00 (CET)
  - Summer (DST): UTC+02:00 (CEST)
- Postal codes: 67827
- Dialling codes: 06364 (Roth: 06753)
- Vehicle registration: KH

Becherbach is an Ortsgemeinde – a municipality belonging to a Verbandsgemeinde, a kind of collective municipality – in the Bad Kreuznach district in Rhineland-Palatinate, Germany. It belongs to the Verbandsgemeinde Nahe-Glan. Becherbach should not be confused with Becherbach bei Kirn, which lies in the same district.

== Geography ==
=== Location ===
Becherbach lies in the Palatinate south of Meisenheim and east of Lauterecken. Nearby towns are the district seat, Bad Kreuznach, which lies 24 km to the northeast, Birkenfeld, lying 35 km to the west and Kaiserslautern, lying 23 km to the south.

=== Neighbouring municipalities ===
Clockwise from the north, Becherbach's neighbours are the municipality of Reiffelbach, the municipality of Schmittweiler (both in the Bad Kreuznach district), the municipality of Waldgrehweiler (in the Donnersbergkreis), the municipality of Nußbach, the municipality of Reipoltskirchen, the municipality of Ginsweiler, the municipality of Adenbach and the municipality of Odenbach (all in the Kusel district).

=== Constituent communities ===
Becherbach's Ortsteile are the main village, also called Becherbach (roughly 550 inhabitants), and also Gangloff (some 275 inhabitants) and Roth (some 275 inhabitants). Also belonging to the main village are the outlying homesteads of Kirnbuscherhof, Römerhof and Rothenbaumerhof.

== History ==
=== Antiquity ===
Archaeological finds from the New Stone Age have been made in Gangloff and Roth. The Roman linking road between Bad Kreuznach and Otterberg led by way of the Rossberg near Becherbach and Gangloff. A sideroad off this thoroughfare leading to Odenbach ran between Becherbach and Roth. The path running through this area is known to this day as the Römerstraße (“Roman road”). Found on the Rossberg's summit were three block-shaped stones that were dedicated to Mercury and his mother Maia, two Roman coins and tiles and a stamp. These finds have all been lost. In the village church, a Roman gravestone was found. Unearthed at the Gangloff graveyard was a Viergötterstein (a “four-god stone”, a pedestal on which a Jupiter Column was customarily stood). No Roman finds have come to light in Roth.

=== Middle Ages ===
The whole of what is now the municipality of Becherbach lay under the Counts of Veldenz, and after they died out, under the House of Wittelsbach (the Duchy of Palatinate-Zweibrücken and later the Kingdom of Bavaria).

=== Modern times ===
Becherbach long lay on the border between two states: Meisenheim, which at an earlier time (as also once again today) had been placed above Becherbach as an administrative seat, belonged between the Congress of Vienna in 1815 and Germany's more recent division into Bundesländer in 1946 to Prussia, or before 1866 to the Landgraviate of Hesse-Homburg. The border was thus only some 7 to 9 km away from the three villages that today make up the municipality of Becherbach. The NSDAP Ortsgruppe (“local group”) in Becherbach was founded in October 1927 by Emil Gauer, a Nazi politician, born in Becherbach, who was later installed as the ideologically true mayor of Pirmasens in 1937, serving until his arrest by the Americans in 1945. Between 1928 and 1933, the NSDAP's electoral successes in the local area were greater than the average for the Weimar Republic. The Antisemitic newspaper, Der Stürmer, however, wrote in April 1936 that the populace of Odenbach, Becherbach and the surrounding area were to some extent still “strongly vernagelt (variously translated as “stubborn”, “narrowminded” or “slow-witted”) and behind the moon (roughly “behind the times”)”. This arose from a Jewish woman’s burial that was attended by various inhabitants – whom Der Stürmer named in the article – of the villages mentioned. In 1954, Becherbach got its first watermain, and thereby took its first step towards modernization. The Ortsgemeinde that exists today came into being on 7 June 1969 through the merger of three hitherto self-administering municipalities: Becherbach/Pfalz (532 inhabitants), Gangloff (270 inhabitants) and Roth (274 inhabitants). At the same time, Becherbach was transferred from the Kusel district to the Bad Kreuznach district.

==== Mining ====
Under Wolfgang, Count Palatine of Zweibrücken, the so-called “Odenbach Seam” (coal) was discovered, which was worked in, among other places, Reiffelbach. Within what is today the municipality of Becherbach, the seam was exploited only in the villages of Gangloff and Roth. The mine in Roth was linked to the one in Odenbach by an underground gallery, while a similar arrangement linked the Hollerbach mine near Roth to the one in Reiffelbach. There was, however, no such link between the two local mines. In 1799 in Becherbach itself (now the main centre of the merged municipality), a limestone mine was worked on the south slopes towards Reipoltskirchen.

==== Cache of explosives and consequent evacuation ====
On 22 January 2011, Becherbach's (the main village's) whole population had to be evacuated from their homes for 16 hours when a local barn was found to contain, according to Der Spiegel, a “truckload” of machine guns, hand grenades and a great amount of explosives. A police spokesman said that it was “presumably” the greatest amount of explosives ever found in the country in a private citizen's hands. It was roughly 50 kg. Authorities disposed of the explosives in controlled explosions on a nearby farm lane, deploying a remote-controlled robot to move the material. The detonations could be heard 10 km away. Südwestrundfunk reported that the explosive in question was nitroglycerine. The unlawful owner of the material was a 62-year-old Hundsbach man identified as “Kurt N.” – and nicknamed “Pulver-Kurt” (“Powder Kurt”) by the locals – who was then investigated for breach of the Kriegswaffenkontrollgesetz (Weapons of War Control Act) and subsequently charged and tried. The magazine Bild reported that Kurt liked to wear a uniform with SS insignia, and that there were photographs of his friends who were similarly heavily armed. Upon conviction, he was sentenced on 21 August 2012 to three and a half years in prison without parole (six months short of what the prosecutor had demanded).

=== Municipality’s name ===
The name Becherbach is believed to stem from either the pitch makers (Pech is “pitch” in German) or the beaker makers (Becher is “beaker” in German, while in Palatine German, it is a word that means “beaker maker”) who worked here in bygone days. The name Gangloff comes from Saint Gangulphus of Burgundy. Roth is a name that crops up often in Germany, and it refers to a clearing.

== Religion ==
Becherbach's inhabitants are mainly Evangelical. Becherbach has belonged since 1975 to the ecclesiastical community of Odenbach, which in turn belongs – as one of its northernmost communities – to the Evangelical Church of the Palatinate. As at 31 July 2013, there are 880 full-time residents in Becherbach, and of those, 708 are Evangelical (80.455%), 67 are Catholic (7.614%), one (0.114%) belongs to the Freireligiöse Landesgemeinde Pfalz (“Palatinate Free Religious State Community”), 6 (0.682%) belong to other religious groups and 98 (11.136%) either have no religion or will not reveal their religious affiliation.

== Politics ==
=== Municipal council ===
The council is made up of 12 council members, who were elected by majority vote at the municipal election held on 7 June 2009, and the honorary mayor as chairman.

=== Mayor ===
Becherbach's mayor is Manfred Denzer, who succeeded Wolfgang Paulus, who had been in office since 1991, in 2009. Both men's political affiliation is with the SPD.

=== Coat of arms ===
The municipality's arms might be described thus: Or a beacon sable inflamed gules.

The arms came into being in 1952 and are canting arms for, at least, one of the municipality's supposed namesakes, the pitch gatherers, for the only charge in the arms, a flaming beacon, is known in German as a Pechkorb (literally “pitch basket”). The tinctures gules and Or (red and gold) are those once borne by Palatinate-Zweibrücken. Roth's unofficial arms show a tree standing on a three-knolled hill (a charge called a Dreiberg in German heraldry) flanked by crossed miner's hammers on the sinister (armsbearer's left, viewer's right) side and a ploughshare on the dexter (armsbearer's right, viewer's left) side. Gangloff has no arms, unofficial or otherwise, but the St. Gangolf Pipes & Drums club (bagpipes) has a coat of arms charged with Saint Gangulphus's image, a steed for the Rossberg (whose name literally means “Steed Mountain”) that lies between Becherbach and Gangloff and a holy spring (one of Gangulphus's attributes), thus symbolizing the club's home village.

== Culture and sightseeing ==
=== Buildings ===
The following are listed buildings or sites in Rhineland-Palatinate’s Directory of Cultural Monuments:

==== Becherbach (main centre) ====
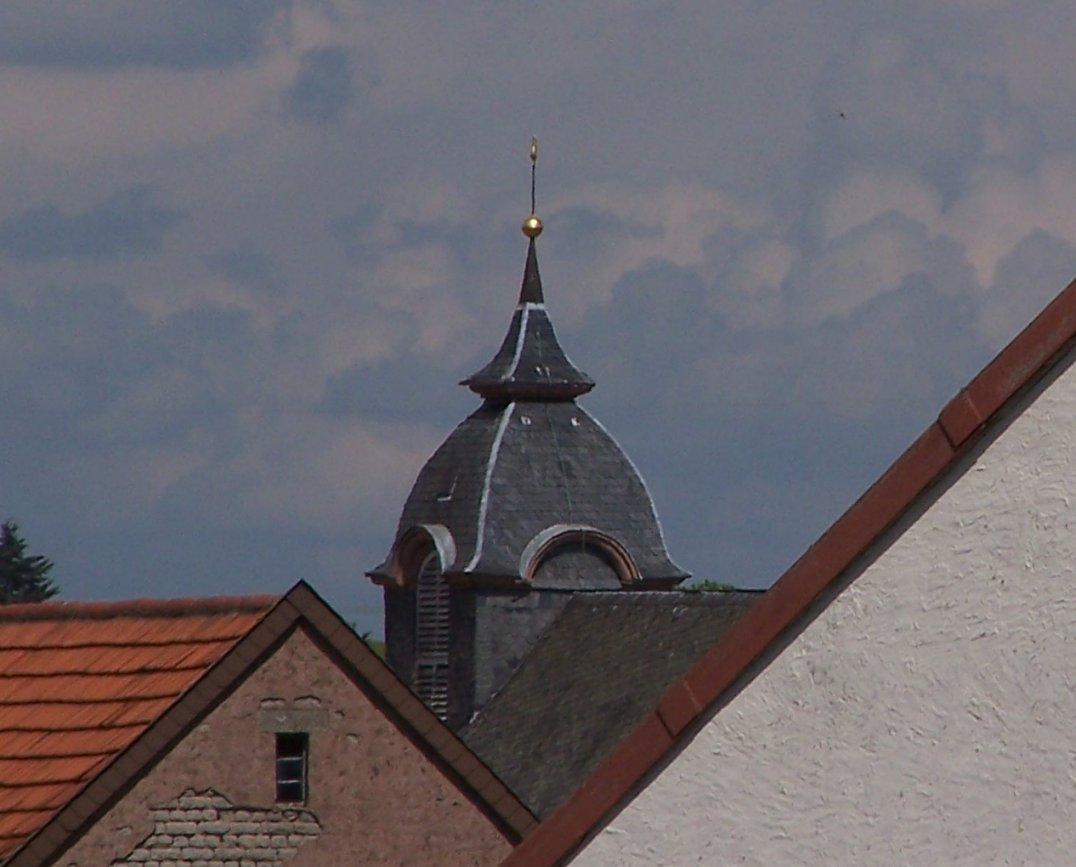
Hauptstraße 93: Evangelical church (tower roof)

- Evangelical church, Hauptstraße 93 – Classicist aisleless church, 1791–1793, architect Friedrich Gerhard Wahl
- Oberdorf 104 – L-shaped estate complex; house with single roof ridge, earlier half of the 19th century

==== Gangloff ====
- Evangelical parish church, Roßbergstraße 295 – Classicist aisleless church, 1832–1835
- Brögt 277 – estate complex; house with single roof ridge, building with half-hip roof, partly timber-frame, early 19th century
- Roßbergstraße – former school; Late Classicist sandstone-block building, mid 19th century
- Roßbergstraße 220 – estate complex; house with single roof ridge, partly timber-frame, early 19th century
- Roßbergstraße 235 – estate complex; Late Baroque house with single roof ridge, building with half-hip roof, partly timber-frame, possibly from the latter half of the 18th century

==== Roth ====
- Schulgasse 325 – estate complex; house with single roof ridge, quarrystone, essentially possibly from the 16th or 17th century, remodelled in the 19th century, barn marked 1921
- Schulgasse 326 – three sided estate, 19th or 20th century; two-part timber-frame house, essentially possibly Baroque, 18th century
- Vordergasse 305 – Gründerzeit-Late Classicist house, marked 1910, essentially possibly from the 19th century

=== Sport and leisure ===
Gangloff has an independent football club that is also active in youth work.

=== Regular events ===
The only major secular festival in Becherbach is the kermis (church consecration festival, locally known as the Kerb), which is held on the first weekend in September from Friday to Monday, with a parade on Sunday. The two outlying villages also hold kermises at about the same time.

== Famous people ==
=== Sons and daughters of the town ===
- Erich Müller-Gangloff (b. 12 February 1907 in Roth; d. 23 February 1980 in West Berlin), German journalistic writer, Evangelical academy director and peace activist
