= Schmittweiler =

- Municipality
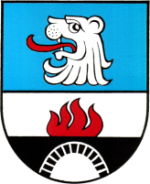
- Coat of arms

- Location of Schmittweiler within Bad Kreuznach district
- Interactive map of Schmittweiler
- Location within Germany Location within Rhineland-Palatinate
- Coordinates: 49°41′27.78″N 7°42′14.16″E
- Country: Germany
- State: Rhineland-Palatinate
- District: Bad Kreuznach
- Municipal assoc.: Nahe-Glan

Government
  - Mayor (2019–24): Ute Ammann

Area
  - Total: 5.48 km^{2} (2.12 sq mi)
- Elevation: 273 m (896 ft)

Population (2025-12-31)
  - Total: 162
  - Density: 29.6/km^{2} (76.6/sq mi)
- Time zone: UTC+01:00 (CET)
  - Summer (DST): UTC+02:00 (CEST)
- Postal codes: 67829
- Dialling codes: 06753
- Vehicle registration: KH
- Website: www.schmittweiler.de

Schmittweiler is an Ortsgemeinde – a municipality belonging to a Verbandsgemeinde, a kind of collective municipality – in the Bad Kreuznach district in Rhineland-Palatinate, Germany. It belongs to the Verbandsgemeinde Nahe-Glan.

== Geography ==
=== Location ===
Schmittweiler is a linear village (by some definitions, a “thorpe”) that lies in the Eschelbach valley, a narrow side valley whose mouth can be found in Callbach, in the North Palatine Uplands. The countryside around Schmittweiler lies in the south of the Bad Kreuznach district. In the southeast, the municipal area borders on the Donnersbergkreis. The municipal area measures 540 ha.

=== Neighbouring municipalities ===
Clockwise from the north, Schmittweiler’s neighbours are Callbach, Finkenbach-Gersweiler, Waldgrehweiler (these last two lying in the neighbouring Donnersbergkreis), Becherbach and Reiffelbach, which all, but for those otherwise noted, likewise lie in the Bad Kreuznach district.

== History ==
After the Congress of Vienna (1815), Schmittweiler belonged to the Rheinkreis, an exclave of the Kingdom of Bavaria, in which it remained through Bavarian times, Imperial times, Weimar times and the time of the Third Reich, becoming part of the newly founded state of Rhineland-Palatinate only after the Second World War. To distinguish itself from the outlying centre of Schönenberg-Kübelberg also known as Schmittweiler, the village once bore the official tag “Amtsgericht Lauterecken”. In the course of administrative restructuring in Rhineland-Palatinate in 1969, Schmittweiler was transferred from the Kusel district to the Bad Kreuznach district. From an ecclesiastical standpoint, Schmittweiler still belongs to the Evangelical Church of the Palatinate (Evangelical) and the Roman Catholic Diocese of Speyer.

=== Population development ===
Schmittweiler’s population development since Napoleonic times is shown in the table below. The figures for the years from 1871 to 1987 are drawn from census data:

Year	Inhabitants
1815	199
1835	219
1871	369
1905	311
1939	292

Year	Inhabitants
1950	295
1961	243
1970	231
1987	194
2005	246

== Religion ==
As at 31 January 2014, there are 198 full-time residents in Schmittweiler, and of those, 125 are Evangelical (63.131%), 44 are Catholic (22.222%), and 29 (14.646%) either have no religion or will not reveal their religious affiliation.

== Politics ==
=== Municipal council ===
The council is made up of 6 council members, who were elected by majority vote at the municipal election held on 7 June 2009, and the honorary mayor as chairman.

=== Mayor ===
Schmittweiler’s mayor is Ute Ammann.

=== Coat of arms ===
The municipality’s arms might be described thus: Per fess azure a lion’s head erased argent langued gules and argent in base a bridge arched of one sable upon which fire of the third.

== Culture and sightseeing ==
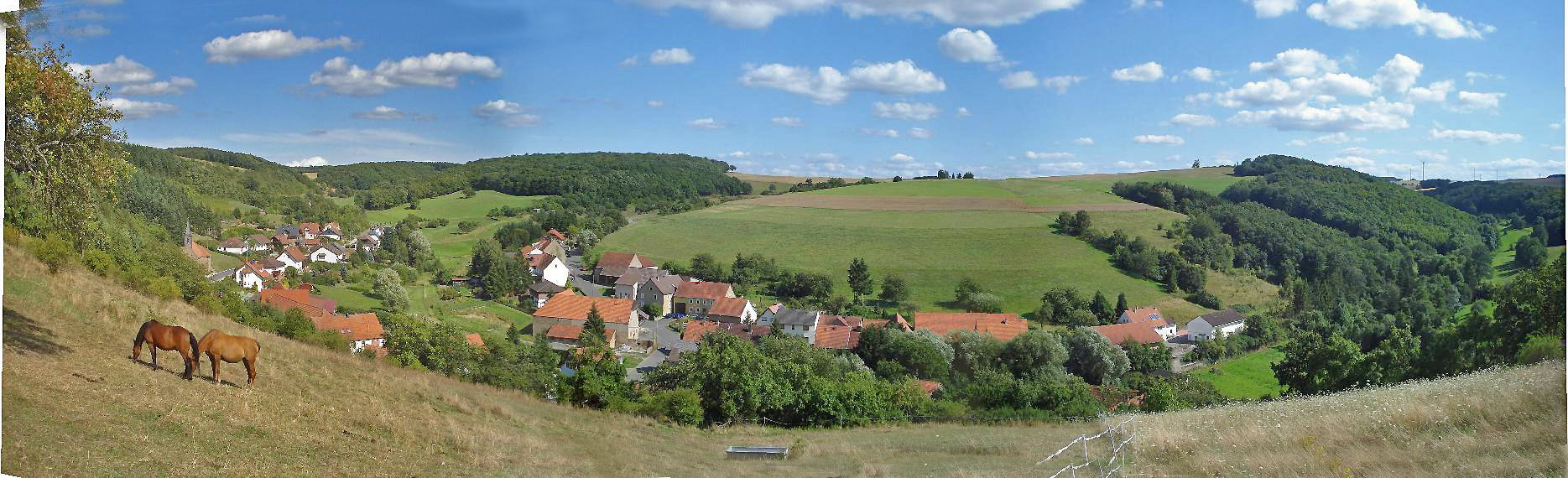
Panorama 1
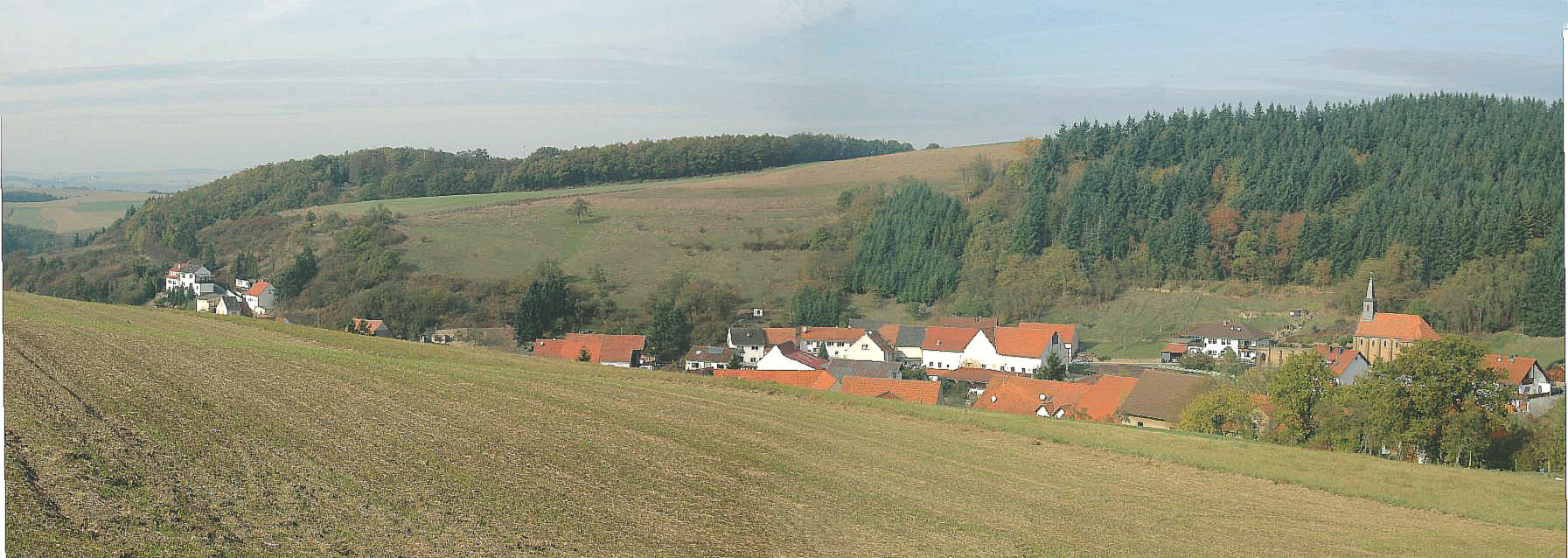
Panorama 2

=== Buildings ===
The following are listed buildings or sites in Rhineland-Palatinate’s Directory of Cultural Monuments:

- Evangelical church, Hauptstraße – Baroque aisleless church, marked 1749 and 1962 (renovated)
- Saint Hildegard’s Catholic Church (Kirche St. Hildegard), Hauptstraße – Gothicized sandstone-block building, Heimatstil, 1930, architect Albert Boßlet, Würzburg
- Am Borngarten 4 – timber-frame house, apparently from the 15th century
- Bachstraße 1 – complex along the street, earlier half of the 19th century
- Bachstraße 2 – estate complex; house with single roof ridge, partly timber-frame, possibly from the early 19th century
- Hauptstraße 29 – estate complex; house marked 1816

=== Regular events ===
Each year on 3 October, German Unity Day, Schmittweiler holds its Autumn Festival (Herbstfest) with a farmer's market.

== Economy and infrastructure ==
=== Transport ===
Running into Schmittweiler is Kreisstraße 76, known locally as Hauptstraße (“Main Street”). This leads northwards out of the village down the Eschelbach valley to Callbach, where it links with Bundesstraße 420, 2 km away. The nearest railway stations are Alsenz, 14 km east of Schmittweiler on the Alsenz Valley Railway (Alsenztalbahn; Bingen–Kaiserslautern), Staudernheim, 15 km north on the Nahe Valley Railway (Bingen–Saarbrücken) and Lauterecken-Grumbach, 15 km southwest on the Lauter Valley Railway to Kaiserslautern.
