= Kirrweiler, Kusel =

Kirrweiler
- Municipality
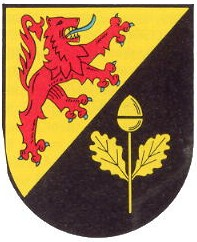
- Coat of arms

- Location of Kirrweiler within Kusel district
- Interactive map of Kirrweiler
- Location within Germany Location within Rhineland-Palatinate
- Coordinates: 49°38′5″N 7°30′6″E
- Country: Germany
- State: Rhineland-Palatinate
- District: Kusel
- Municipal assoc.: Lauterecken-Wolfstein

Government
  - Mayor (2019–24): Ralf Schuster

Area
  - Total: 6.36 km^{2} (2.46 sq mi)
- Elevation: 270 m (890 ft)

Population (2025-12-31)
  - Total: 159
  - Density: 25.0/km^{2} (64.7/sq mi)
- Time zone: UTC+01:00 (CET)
  - Summer (DST): UTC+02:00 (CEST)
- Postal codes: 67744
- Dialling codes: 06387
- Vehicle registration: KUS
- Website: www.kirrweiler.com

Kirrweiler (German pronunciation: [ˈkɪʁvaɪlɐ]) is an Ortsgemeinde – a municipality belonging to a Verbandsgemeinde, a kind of collective municipality – in the Kusel district in Rhineland-Palatinate, Germany. It belongs to the Verbandsgemeinde Lauterecken-Wolfstein.

== Geography ==
=== Location ===
The municipality lies in the Western Palatinate between the Palatinate Forest and the Hunsrück. Kirrweiler lies on a sloped plateau that rises gently from south to north (from 320 to 350 m above sea level). South of the village rises the Anderbach, which runs for some 3 km down to its mouth into the Glan near Glanbrücken. The outlying centre of Zollstock lies at an elevation of 360 m above sea level on the heights of a mountain saddle that stands between the Anderbach and Rötelbach valleys. The municipal area is 51% wooded.

In 1938, when the Baumholder troop drilling ground was being built, the municipality was stripped of 155.5 ha of woodland by the Nazis. In the course of disarmament after the Cold War, Kirrweiler received 170.21 ha of the drilling ground in 1993. Although this is now officially part of the municipal area, the landowner is still the German federal government.

=== Neighbouring municipalities ===
Kirrweiler borders in the north on the municipality of Homberg (and more specifically on the Schönbornerhof, that municipality's historic farm estate), in the northeast on the municipality of Herren-Sulzbach, in the east on the municipality of Deimberg, in the south on the municipality of Sankt Julian and in the west on the Baumholder troop drilling ground.

=== Constituent communities ===
Also belonging to Kirrweiler is the outlying homestead of Zollstock.

=== Municipality’s layout ===
Kirrweiler lies on a street that runs through the village, branching off which are three smaller, built-up streets. There are two old village centres, the Oberdorf ("Upper Village") and the Unterdorf ("Lower Village"), which, owing to later building in between, have now been joined. A piped well that once stood between these two centres has since disappeared. The village's farmhouses are still mostly of the Einfirsthaus variety ("one-roof-ridge house"). All together, very little new building work is in evidence. The former schoolhouse stands on a sidestreet in the Upper Village and is nowadays used as business premises. The graveyard with its great mortuary lies at the village's upper end.

== History ==
=== Antiquity ===
The broader area around Kirrweiler was settled in prehistoric times, bearing witness to which are grave goods that have been unearthed. Within Kirrweiler's limits long ago, the foundations of a Gallo-Roman estate were discovered.

=== Middle Ages ===
Kirrweiler lay in the Nahegau, having been founded in the 11th or 12th century at a church, which later vanished. Local rural cadastral toponyms still preserve references to a church. As early as 1259, Kirrweiler had its first documentary mention in a document from the Counts of Zweibrücken. According to historian Wilhelm Fabricius (1857-1942), the village belonged to the Gericht auf der Höhe ("Court on the Heights"), which itself was considered part of the Hochgericht auf der Heide ("High Court on the Heath"). The Gericht auf der Höhe was named when in 1258, Castle Grumbach with its surrounding lands was given to the Waldgraves and Rhinegraves of Dhaun. The villages in this court region appeared in a 1363 document dealing with the pledging of these lands to Sponheim-Starkenburg, with Kirrweiler named among them. Kirrweiler cropped up once again in a 1443 document, according to which the "poor people of Grumbach" were transferred to Count Friedrich III of Veldenz and his son-in-law Stephan, who the very next year, on his father-in-law's death, founded the Duchy of Palatinate-Zweibrücken. Both were to be "lord protectors" of the district. Thus, Kirrweiler originally belonged to the Nahegau, from which arose the Waldgraves and Rhinegraves, then it passed to the Waldgraviate-Rhinegraviate of Dhaun, later passing to the County of Veldenz in 1443 and its successors, the Counts Palatine of Zweibrücken. Thereafter, the area was bought back by the Lords of Grumbach. Even later, though, Kirrweiler was now and then the object of exchanges in divisions of holdings or disputes among the various lines of the Waldgraves and Rhinegraves.

=== Modern times ===
In the 16th century and the earlier half of the 17th, Kirrweiler was a rather big village. In 1642, towards the war's end, there were still many households (23 according to one source; 32 according to another), whereas the villages in the broader surrounding area had for the most part been wiped right out by the effects of the Thirty Years' War. Among these households was the Kirrweiler Hof (estate), which belonged to the Waldgraves and Rhinegraves of Grumbach. If Kirrweiler had withstood the horror of that war relatively well, things did not go quite as well in 1677 in the Franco-Dutch War when French King Louis XIV's troops burnt the village right down to the ground; not even one house was left standing. A century later, in 1778, yet another catastrophe befell the village when eleven houses along with their outbuildings (more than half the village's houses) burnt down; many other houses had their roofs burnt off. Only through great sacrifices could the village be restored.

Until the French Revolution broke out, Kirrweiler remained in Rhinegravial hands. Otto Karsch wrote "Various things are reported to us in old writings about Kirrweiler and its inhabitants. The documents tell of the village’s buildings, of the municipal centre that stood in the upper village next to the blacksmith’s shop, of the tithe barn and the old herdsman’s house, and also of sale and exchange deals, mill and water rights, and of a woman whose name and fate have remained alive through the centuries." This woman that Karsch referred to was named Barbara Weiß, who in 1612 at the age of 86 was, as an accused witch, tortured and as a result of this and other grievous treatment, died.

==== Recent times ====
During the time of the French Revolution and the Napoleonic era that followed, the German lands on the Rhine’s left bank were annexed by France. Kirrweiler belonged to the Mairie ("Mayoralty") of Grumbach, the Canton of Grumbach, the Arrondissement of Birkenfeld and the Department of Sarre. Several young men from the village served in the French army.

Above Kirrweiler, on the hill known as the "Husarenpötsch" or "Husarenbusch", the French built a rather odd-looking building in 1813, towards the end of the time of French rule, a tall wooden or iron tower with several movable vanes at the top. A string of such towers stood, each about 10 to 15 km from its two neighbours, running from Paris to Mainz (or Mayence, as the region's Napoleonic rulers called it). It was a semaphore station, one in a chain designed to transmit information quickly over great distances, encoding messages in the positions of the aforesaid vanes. Each of the possible positions of the vanes could stand for a letter, a figure, a whole word, or even a whole sentence. As the French withdrew in 1814, they destroyed each semaphore station as they went.

In 1816, Kirrweiler passed as part of the Amt of Grumbach and under the terms of the Congress of Vienna to the Principality of Lichtenberg, a newly created exclave of the Duchy of Saxe-Coburg-Saalfeld, which as of 1826 became the Duchy of Saxe-Coburg and Gotha. As part of this state, it passed in 1834 to the Kingdom of Prussia, which made this area into the Sankt Wendel district. Later, after the First World War, the Treaty of Versailles stipulated, among other things, that 26 of the Sankt Wendel district's 94 municipalities had to be ceded to the British- and French-occupied Saar. The remaining 68 municipalities then bore the designation "Restkreis St. Wendel-Baumholder", with the first syllable of Restkreis having the same meaning as in English, in the sense of "left over". Kirrweiler belonged to this district until 1937, when it was transferred to the Birkenfeld district, which was created by uniting the Restkreis with a former Oldenburg district, also called Birkenfeld. This now lay within the Regierungsbezirk of Koblenz, and still in Prussia, although since the Kaiser had abdicated in 1917, it was no longer a kingdom. After the Second World War, Kirrweiler first lay still within the Regierungsbezirk of Koblenz, but now in the then newly founded state of Rhineland-Palatinate. In the course of administrative restructuring in the state in 1968, the Amt of Grumbach was dissolved, and in 1972, Kirrweiler was grouped into the then newly formed Verbandsgemeinde of Lauterecken, and at the same time it was transferred from the Regierungsbezirk of Koblenz to the newly formed Regierungsbezirk of Rheinhessen-Pfalz (Rhineland-Palatinate has since abolished all its Regierungsbezirke).

=== Population development ===
The village of Kirrweiler has remained rurally structured to this day. Until a few decades ago, most people earned their livelihoods mainly at agriculture. Besides farmers, there were farmhands and foresters as well as craftsmen. There were hardly any other kinds of jobs to be had. Now that farming employs only a few people, most workers must now seek a living elsewhere. As early as 1955, of the 75 people in the workforce at that time, 55 had to commute to jobs elsewhere. This trend became more pronounced, to the point of a drop in population. The 32 households in 1642 would have comprised some 150 people. The outlying centre of Zollstock today has roughly seven inhabitants.

The following table shows population development over the centuries for Kirrweiler:

Year	1815	1860	1900	1925	1958	2000	2007
Total	168	269	274	305	297	219	177

=== Municipality’s name ===
Names that Kirrweiler has borne over time are Kirwilre (1259), Kylwilre (1319), Kylenwilre (1324), Kyrweiler (1367), Kirwilre (1411) and Kerwiller (about 1500). Even today, the dialectal form of the name is Kerrwiller. Places with names ending in —weiler, which as a standalone word means "hamlet" (originally "homestead"), might theoretically have been settled as early as the time when the Franks took over the land by way of the old Roman roads. That would seem to be the case here, as an old road that runs by Kirrweiler is still described as the Römerstraße ("Roman road"). What is likelier, though, is that even Kirrweiler is one of the later settlements with names ending in —weiler that were founded on into the 12th century. One attempt to explain the village's name, with its prefix Kirr—, is that it came from kirichvilare, meaning a hamlet at a church (Kirche in German). It is indeed quite likely that a church once stood in Kirrweiler. After all, a 1746 Grumbach court protocol dealt with a meadow that lay "behind the church", and to this day there is a part of the village called "an der Kirche" ("at the Church"). The village may have sprung up around the church. Researcher Otto Karsch, nevertheless, held the view that the village's name did not go back to the church, but rather that kar or kir was a word meaning "membership in a kindred group" or "kin". Thus, Kirrweiler might have been a family-group settlement. Furthermore, according to Karsch, the name already existed when the church was built, that is, the village arose first, and then later the church, and therefore, the name has nothing to do with the church.

== Religion ==
Kirrweiler might have arisen in the Early Middle Ages at a church, which would have been the hub of a parish. This arrangement, however, changed. The parish's hub was later Herren-Sulzbach. The village belonged to the Diocese of Mainz. With the introduction of the Reformation into the Waldgravial-Rhinegravial House of Grumbach, the Protestant parish of Herren-Sulzbach was founded in 1556. Then, as now, the village of Kirrweiler belonged to it. Until the Thirty Years' War, all the villagers were Protestant. Later, other denominations were tolerated, although none ever earned any special significance. To this day, the overwhelming majority is Evangelical.

== Politics ==
=== Municipal council ===
The council is made up of 6 council members, who were elected by majority vote at the municipal election held on 7 June 2009, and the honorary mayor as chairman.

=== Mayor ===
Kirrweiler's mayor is Ralf Schuster.

=== Coat of arms ===
The municipality's arms might be described thus: Per bend sinister Or a lion rampant sinister gules armed and langued azure and sable an oak sprig palewise couped foiled of two and fructed of one of the first.

The charge on the dexter (armsbearer's right, viewer's left) side is a reference to the village's former allegiance to the Waldgraviate-Rhinegraviate. The charge on the sinister (armsbearer's left, viewer's right) side, the oak sprig, refers to the Kreuz- und Elendseiche ("Cross and Wretchedness Oak") that once stood near Kirrweiler. The arms have been borne since 1964 when they were approved by the Rhineland-Palatinate Ministry of the Interior.

=== Town partnerships ===
Kirrweiler fosters partnerships with the following places

- (Germany) Kirrweiler, Südliche Weinstraße, Rhineland-Palatinate
- Kirrwiller, Bas-Rhin, France
- Kirviller, Moselle, France

All partnerships have existed since 1975.

== Culture and sightseeing ==
=== Buildings ===
The following are listed buildings or sites in Rhineland-Palatinate’s Directory of Cultural Monuments:

- Hauptstraße 16 – graveyard hall, long hall with hipped roof, marked 1836
- Oberdorf 4 – Quereinhaus (a combination residential and commercial house divided for these two purposes down the middle, perpendicularly to the street), essentially from the 17th century, conversion in the latter half of the 19th century

=== Regular events ===
Kirrweiler’s kermis (church consecration festival) is held on the second weekend in September. Regularly held even now is also the Kirrweilertreffen ("Kirrweiler Meeting") at which people from this Kirrweiler, the one near Landau and the one in Alsace (all called "Kirrweiler" in German). Old customs such as were once kept in all villages in the Glan area are today hardly ever observed.

=== Clubs ===
Until a short time ago, Kirrweiler had a singing club (founded in 1883), a countrywomen's club (founded in 1977), an SPD local chapter (founded in 1987) and a youth club (founded in 1995). Of these, only the countrywomen's club remains.

== Economy and infrastructure ==
=== Economic structure ===
In the time after the Second World War, the number of farms shrank markedly, and those that were left thereby became bigger. Farms run as primary businesses became secondary businesses. In very recent years, farms have been being given up one by one. Kirrweiler now has a business that recycles paper.

=== Education ===
As in the other villages in the Amt of Grumbach, in Kirrweiler in the late 16th century, owing to changes wrought by the Reformation, efforts arose to teach children to read and write. People were to be put in a position to be able to read the Bible for themselves, thereby raising the general level of education. Attendance was at first voluntary, and school was offered in the parish seat of Herren-Sulzbach. It is likely that regular schooling in Kirrweiler itself only began in the earlier half of the 18th century. The year 1748 borne by the former bell of the school at Kirrweiler leads to the conclusion that about then, school was being taught. Since the village had its own parish hall, this would also have been used as the school. There was not very much room in the house. An 1816 description of the building reads: "The house was built and is maintained by the municipality, has two floors, downstairs lives the field watchman, upstairs the schoolteacher, has a parlour that is spacious, in which however he must hold classes (number of pupils 30) and at the same time live with his family." Beginning in 1817, Kirrweiler had school the year round. Hitherto, classes had only been held in the winter. In 1841-1842, a new one-room schoolhouse was built, which was used as such until 1968. This schoolhouse also housed a bigger dwelling for the teacher. The building has since passed into private ownership. The last schoolteacher in Kirrweiler was Theo Menke. Beginning in 1968, the primary school pupils at first attended the primary school in Offenbach and the Hauptschule students attended the Hauptschule Offenbach-St. Julian. There were also later changes. The primary school pupils were taught in Sankt Julian and the Hauptschule students at the Hauptschule Lauterecken, although for a while, a few classes were housed at the Offenbach schoolhouse. Given over to the teachers’ families who made their home in Kirrweiler over 200 years is a sizeable section in the book Salisso (writers Karl Theodor Grashof and Albrecht Guischard; published in Cologne in 2000), about the parish of Herren-Sulzbach. There were opportunities for vocational training at one time Offenbach and Idar-Oberstein. Young farmers could attend agricultural schools in Meisenheim and Baumholder, and after regional reform in 1968, in Kusel, too. Vocational training is now handled by vocational schools in Kusel. Gymnasien can be found in Lauterecken, Meisenheim and Kusel.

=== Transport ===
Kirrweiler lies on Landesstraße 373, which leads from Bundesstraße 420, running to the south of Kirrweiler, from a point near Glanbrücken across the upland at the side of the Glan to Bundesstraße 270 near Langweiler. The nearest Autobahn interchange is some 20 km away near Kusel. Lauterecken-Grumbach station, 7 km away, is on the Lauter Valley Railway (Lautertalbahn), and Altenglan station, 12 km away, is on the Landstuhl–Kusel railway. Formerly, Offenbach and Niedereisenbach stations each lay only about 3 km away from Kirrweiler, but these are now closed.
