= Homberg, Kusel =

Homberg
- Municipality
- Coat of arms

- Location of Homberg within Kusel district
- Interactive map of Homberg
- Location within Germany Location within Rhineland-Palatinate
- Coordinates: 49°39′5″N 7°30′58″E
- Country: Germany
- State: Rhineland-Palatinate
- District: Kusel
- Municipal assoc.: Lauterecken-Wolfstein

Government
  - Mayor (2019–24): Marc-Steffen Risch

Area
  - Total: 10.89 km^{2} (4.20 sq mi)
- Elevation: 340 m (1,120 ft)

Population (2025-12-31)
  - Total: 212
  - Density: 19.5/km^{2} (50.4/sq mi)
- Time zone: UTC+01:00 (CET)
  - Summer (DST): UTC+02:00 (CEST)
- Postal codes: 67744
- Dialling codes: 06788
- Vehicle registration: KUS
- Website: www.hombergonline.de

Homberg (German pronunciation: [ˈhɔmbɛʁk]) is an Ortsgemeinde – a municipality belonging to a Verbandsgemeinde, a kind of collective municipality – in the Kusel district in Rhineland-Palatinate, Germany. It belongs to the Verbandsgemeinde Lauterecken-Wolfstein.

== Geography ==
=== Location ===
Homberg lies at the edge of the North Palatine Uplands in the Western Palatinate, roughly 7 km from Lauterecken. The village itself stretches along a high hollow that opens towards the east into the Grumbach valley at an elevation of some 320 m above sea level. The Schönbornerhof about one kilometre away and with an excellent view over the North Palatine Uplands lies almost 400 m above sea level. The Kellertsberg, a mountain near the village, reaches a height of 450 m. The municipal area measures 1 086 ha, of which roughly 130 ha is wooded. These figures take into account the large parcel of land transferred to the municipality from the Baumholder troop drilling ground.

=== Neighbouring municipalities ===
Homberg borders in the north on the municipality of Langweiler, in the east on the municipality of Herren-Sulzbach, in the south on the municipality of Kirrweiler, in the west on the Baumholder troop drilling ground and in the northwest on the municipality of Unterjeckenbach. Homberg also meets the municipality of Merzweiler at a single point in the northeast.

=== Constituent communities ===
Also belonging to Homberg is the outlying homestead of Schönbornerhof.

=== Municipality’s layout ===
The village of Homberg lies on a through road running from northeast to southwest, and is most thickly concentrated near two intersections roughly in the village centre. One intersection leads to a country path while the other is a road leading to the neighbouring village of Herren-Sulzbach. The village's appearance is still largely characterized by old farmhouses. All together there is very little in the way of new building activity. The graveyard lies at the village's western entrance on the north side of the road.

== History ==
=== Antiquity ===
The greater area was already settled in prehistoric times, although no archaeological finds have been made within Homberg's own limits to confirm this, unless the vanished village of Käsweiler is prehistoric, an assumption that is far from certain.

=== Middle Ages ===
The mediaeval historical development that Homberg experienced closely matches that experienced by neighbouring villages such as Kirrweiler, Deimberg, Buborn, Langweiler and Hausweiler. Like these places, Homberg belonged until 1140 to the Nahegau, and then thereafter until 1263 to the Waldgraviate, which itself had arisen from the Nahegau. As far as is now known, Homberg had its first documentary mention in 1319. In the document in question, an arbitrator confirmed that Waldgrave Friedrich of Kyrburg had to forgo all his claims to rights to Hoenberg and a series of other places in the “Gericht auf der Höhe” (“Court on the Heights”). The Gericht auf der Höhe was said to be a constituent district of the “Hochgericht auf der Heide” (“High Court on the Heath”), which comprised, roughly, lands in a triangle bounded by the Nahe, the Glan and the Steinalp (another river). The 1319 document dealt with a dispute between the two Waldgravial sidelines of Kyrburg and Dhaun-Grumbach. About 1344, in his own documents, the name “Friedrich von Hoenberg” appeared. He was obviously a nobleman who came from Homberg, but nothing else about him has come to light. The villages under the Gericht auf der Höhe, among which was Homberg, were pledged first, in 1363, by Johann von Dhaun to Sponheim-Starkenburg and then in 1443 by Waldgrave and Rhinegrave Friedrich to the last of the Counts of Veldenz, namely Friedrich III, whose daughter Anna married King Ruprecht's son Count Palatine Stephan. The document whereby this arrangement was laid out referred to the village's inhabitants as the “poor people of Grumbach”. By uniting his own Palatine holdings with the now otherwise heirless County of Veldenz – his wife had inherited the county upon her father Friedrich III's death in 1444, but not his comital title – and by redeeming the hitherto pledged County of Zweibrücken, Stephan founded a new County Palatine, as whose comital residence he chose the town of Zweibrücken: the County Palatine – later Duchy – of Palatinate-Zweibrücken. Thus, Homberg, and the other villages, too, lay within this duchy, but they were all returned to the Waldgraviate in 1477 when the pledge was redeemed.

=== Modern times ===
Beginning in 1477, Homberg belonged to the lordship of Grumbach until the time of the French Revolution. Like Kirrweiler, Homberg was mostly spared the woe of the Thirty Years' War, coming through it more or less unscathed. However, the Franco-Dutch War was less kind, for in 1677, Homberg was burnt right down by French King Louis XIV's troops. Not one house was left standing, but the Hombergers built their village anew. Homberg was a rich farming village where there was also fruitgrowing. In 1746, according to a court protocol, Phillip Mensch was the Reihebürgermeister, a mayor responsible for a number of villages. In this year, the otherwise trustworthy Mensch got himself into quite a bit of trouble when he auctioned the communal fruit before the recommended time. It was a pleasant, warm autumn day, the auction went quite well and good prices were paid. Afterwards, the mayor invited the villagers to come and drink at the village inn. There, bit by bit, all the money wandered into the innkeeper's pockets. However, it had escaped the mayor's notice that a few villagers had not partaken. Those who had been left out were greatly angered and brought the matter before the court in Grumbach. For this oversight, Phillip Mensch was fined one ounce.

==== Recent times ====
After the French Revolution, French Revolutionary troops occupied the land on the Rhine’s left bank in 1793, and thereby Homberg, along with the Schönbornerhof too, and this territory was ceded to France. Through a law from 26 March 1798, the French abolished feudal rights in their zone of occupation, and there were thus no longer any lordly holdings. During this time and the Napoleonic era that followed, Homberg belonged to the Mairie (“Mayoralty”) of Grumbach, the Canton of Grumbach, the Arrondissement of Birkenfeld and the Department of Sarre. The French declared the Schönbornerhof national property, and as early as 1795, they had it auctioned. Thereafter it found itself under private ownership. The new owner was Christian Mohr, whose descendants still live on the Schönbornerhof. An old Bible from 1754 recalls this time. The French were driven out of the annexed German lands on the Rhine’s left bank in 1814, and Napoleon met his ultimate fate at Waterloo the following year. On 19 October 1814, inhabitants from all villages in the local area turned out and had a freedom celebration on the heights between Herren-Sulzbach and Homberg while cannon salutes and bellringing from Herren-Sulzbach filled the air with the merry mood. In 1816, Homberg passed to the Principality of Lichtenberg (Amt of Grumbach), a newly created exclave of the Duchy of Saxe-Coburg-Saalfeld, which as of 1826 became the Duchy of Saxe-Coburg and Gotha. As part of this state, it passed in 1834 to the Kingdom of Prussia, which made this area into the Sankt Wendel district. Later, after the First World War, the Treaty of Versailles stipulated, among other things, that 26 of the Sankt Wendel district’s 94 municipalities had to be ceded to the British- and French-occupied Saar. The remaining 68 municipalities then bore the designation “Restkreis St. Wendel-Baumholder”, with the first syllable of Restkreis having the same meaning as in English, in the sense of “left over”. Homberg belonged to this district until 1937, when it was transferred to the Birkenfeld district, newly formed out of Lichtenberg and a former Oldenburg district also called Birkenfeld. This lay within the Prussian Regierungsbezirk of Koblenz. After the Second World War, Homberg lay at first in the Regierungsbezirk of Koblenz in the then newly founded state of Rhineland-Palatinate. In the course of administrative restructuring in the state in 1968, the Amt of Grumbach was dissolved and in 1969, Homberg was transferred, this time to the Kusel district, in which it remains today. In 1972, it passed to the newly founded Verbandsgemeinde of Lauterecken and at the same time to the likewise newly founded Regierungsbezirk of Rheinhessen-Pfalz (Rhineland-Palatinate has since abolished its Regierungsbezirke). In 1859, there was a devastating fire that burnt 47 buildings in Homberg down. The people saved themselves, but there was much loss of life among the livestock. The damage was estimated at 35,000 Thaler. The Prussian king granted reconstruction aid in the amount of 1,000 Thaler, and all neighbouring villages, and even some in the Meisenheim area, gathered up funds to help the Hombergers make a new beginning. In the course of reconstruction, water channels were dug and a municipal centre was built. At that time, the foremost things in villagers’ lives were land and livestock. Even a century later, Homberg was still mainly agricultural. In 1958, there were still:

- 18 horses
- 337 cows
- 217 swine
- 7 beekeepers

Though Homberg had always been a place where the people earned their livelihoods at farming, structural changes after the Second World War have wrought significant differences in today's village. The number of full-time farmers has shrunk, although there are still some who farm as a secondary occupation. Most of the village's workforce now works at craft industries. Under Rhineland-Palatinate's Landesgesetz über die Auflösung des Gutsbezirks Baumholder und seine kommunale Neugliederung (roughly “State Law For Dissolving the Regional Estate of Baumholder and Annexing It to Municipalities”) on 2 November 1993 (GVBl. S. 518), the former municipal area of the long vanished village of Ilgesheim – the Nazis had evacuated it in 1933 for military purposes – was annexed to Homberg with effect from 1 January 1994. This acquisition had been part of the Baumholder troop drilling ground. It increased Homberg's land area by about 700 ha – it had been only 300 ha or so before the land transfer.

=== The Schönbornerhof ===
On the road leading out of Homberg towards Kirrweiler and Glanbrücken, one beholds a great farm, the Schönbornerhof, whose history is long and varied. This old estate, nowadays actually run as two separate farms, is an outlying Ortsteil of Homberg. Old documents up until 1605 speak of the Sulzbacher Hof, which can be explained by a tight bond with nearby Herren-Sulzbach, which was likewise held by the Order of Saint John. According to legend passed down through a report by a Mr. Karsch, on the site of the Sulzbacher Hof once lay a wounded warrior whose searing wounds and great thirst led him to believe that he would surely die. There, however, he heard running water, and dragged himself to the spring. He drank from it and his wounds healed. His joy and thanks for this convinced him to stay, build a cabin and name the place zuo dem schönen brunne ("at the lovely spring"), which later became Shonenbrunn (1290) and Schönborn. Whether the ending —born refers to the spring or the cabin might be a pointless question, for it is known that springs and wells were often housed in a little hut to keep the water clean. In the historical record, on the other hand, it is known that until 1290, the Schönbornerhof belonged to the knight Sir Berthold von Grumbach, a courtier of the Waldgraves of Dhaun. Together with his holding of Sulzbach, Berthold bequeathed the estate to his sons, Berthold, Hartrade and Johannes, who were Knights-Hospitaller priests of the Holy House of the Hospital of Ulm. Thus did the estate, with its extensive lands – almost 500 Morgen (or 160 ha) – pass into the Knights Hospitaller’s ownership and become their local seat. Later, the Knights built themselves a new house for the Order in Sulzbach, the fittingly named Haus zu Sulzbach (“House at Sulzbach”), and let the Schönbornerhof to courtiers, whose names are not recorded. Until the monastery building was completed in the neighbouring village, the estate was for a few years the seat of the provostry. Over time, the Knights’ interest in the estate dwindled and they set about selling it. In 1517, the Order of Saint John wanted to sell the Schönbornerhof to Jakob von Montfort, whose family, the robber-knight House of Montfort, had held as its seat the knightly castle at Montfort near Bad Kreuznach, not far from the Lemberg (mountain). This had been destroyed in 1456. Its dwellers now had to make do with humbler lodgings. Thus it was thought that the Order's offer to Jakob von Montfort might come in handy as a place to build a new home for himself and his family for the future. It seemed like an ideal arrangement. The Montforts thus acquired the estate, but were not very good at keeping up on the payments. They could come up with neither the asking price of 200 Rhenish guilders nor the yearly interest of 10 guilders payable until such time as the sale was completed, and thus had to leave the estate. The estate thus passed back to the Order of Saint John and was then pledged to two townsmen, one from Herren-Sulzbach and the other from Kirrweiler. One, though, had the same problem as the Montforts; so actually, the Order ended up keeping one half of the Schönbornerhof while the townsman who could pay his half of the selling price came into ownership of the other half. In 1556, the Order sold its half to the lordship in Grumbach, and fifty years later, in 1606, the Waldgraves and Rhinegraves of Grumbach managed to acquire the other half through exchange. Beginning in 1614, the Counts put the estate into Erbbestand (a uniquely German landhold arrangement in which ownership rights and usage rights are separated; this is forbidden by law in modern Germany). An exhaustive “letter of Erbbestand” still exists at the Landeshauptarchiv Koblenz (Koblenz Main State Archive). The holders of the Erbbestand changed often. Even if the Schönbornerhof had been put into Erbbestand, it also time and again served the Counts of Grumbach as a temporary lodging and hunting seat. In 1691, Waldgrave and Rhinegrave Leopold Phillip Wuilhelm built a small hunting lodge on the estate, which saw avid use. This earned a certain historical importance after, in 1709, things went greatly awry for Stanisław Leszczyński. He was king of Poland, but when his protégé King Charles XII of Sweden lost a battle against the Russian tsar Peter the Great, Stanisław had to flee Poland. By way of Turkey, following a long, circuitous route, he found his way to the Duchy of Palatinate-Zweibrücken, which in 1681 had become Swedish. It was his first visit to Germany. His flight took him through the Lordship of Grumbach in 1714, where he was received by the Waldgraves and Rhinegraves and taken to the Schönbornerhof. There he was wined and dined in kingly fashion. At the table, the Count's young son was supposed to wait on this high-ranking guest. Once, when the boy began to weep bitterly, the king asked why, and learnt that his young waiter was merely very hungry. Laughing, Stanisław saw to it that the child's hunger was quickly banished. Among Leszczyński's entourage was his daughter Maria, later the consort of French King Louis XV. Even in his old age, the king is said to have remembered his reception at the Schönbornerhof fondly.

=== Population development ===
The village has a rural structure to this day. Until a few decades ago, most of the villagers earned their livelihoods in agriculture. Besides farmers, there were also farmhands, forestry workers and a few craftsmen. There were hardly any other jobs to be had. Even today, the municipal area is under agricultural use. Nevertheless, a great number of people in Homberg need to seek work outside the village. As early as 1955, out of 56 members of the workforce, 46 held jobs outside the village.

The following table shows population development over the centuries for Homberg:

Year	1815	1860	1900	1925	1958	2008
Total	141	209	259	284	277	219

=== Municipality’s names ===
Homberg was named in documents from 1319 and 1324, and even as late as 1448, as Hoenberg. About 1500, the form Hombergk cropped up, but it has been Homberg since 1650. However, in the 1797 Schmitt´sche Karte (map), the local dialectal pronunciation of the name in use even now is to be seen: Homerisch (or, according to another source, Homrich). This stems from the formation of an intrusive vowel, “[ɪ]”, which yielded first Homberich, then Homerich, and finally Homerisch. The village's name sprang originally from a field name, ze dem hohen berge. In Modern High German this would be rendered zu dem (or zum) hohen Berg(e), which means "at the high hill (or mountain)". Homberg was a relatively late founding in the 10th or 11th century.

The Schönbornerhof, an historic farm in Homberg, had its first documentary mention in 1290, while Homberg itself was first noted in 1319. The village belonged to the Waldgraves and Rhinegraves, bearing witness to which is the lion in the municipality's coat of arms. The name makes clear a link with a spring (the element —born— means “spring” in Modern High German; the usual form is Brunnen) at the founding site, while the first syllable, Schön— (meaning "lovely" or "nice") likely refers to the estate's view.

=== Vanished villages ===
Within what are now Homberg's limits once lay the village of Käsweiler, named in 1319 as Kesewilre (or Kesvilre) and about 1500 as Keßwiller. The village, however, had vanished even before 1500. Nothing is known about why this happened, but it could have been the Plague, which was ravaging Europe at the time, that sealed the village's fate. All that is found on its former site now is cropland, but it does bear the cadastral name Kesweiler or Käsweiler, thus commemorating the old village. Every so often, stones and bits of wall are supposedly still found. It is likely that this village was considerably older than Homberg itself. The Mr. Karsch mentioned above took the view that Käsweiler had arisen as long ago as pre-Germanic times. It is however questionable as to whether this opinion is tenable. Nevertheless, the monosyllabic prefix Käs— goes back to the Gallo-Romance word cassinus, meaning “oak”, which also gave rise to the French word for that tree, chêne. The word Käsz can also be found in the Alemannic languages, meaning “oaken mast”. Places with the name element —weiler, which as a standalone word means “hamlet” (originally “homestead”), cannot be dated very accurately by this fact alone, as they arose over a very long timespan. The name's original meaning, however, could have been something like “Homestead/Hamlet/Farm at an oak forest”. Most likely, however, it is a case of a village with the name element —weiler founded, as so many were, in the Early Middle Ages. Then, the term Kes for “oak”, whether of Celtic or Germanic origin, would still have been known in the region.

== Religion ==
Within the region governed by the Gericht auf der Höhe (“Court on the Heights”), a parish likely existed in the Early Middle Ages whose hub was a church in the Kirrweiler area and to which Homberg, too, belonged. It would have lain within the Archbishopric of Mainz. Later, the hub shifted to the village of Herren-Sulzbach with its church. With the introduction of the Reformation into the Waldgravial-Rhinegravial House of Grumbach, the Protestant parish of Herren-Sulzbach was founded in 1556. Homberg has belonged ever since to this parish. Until the Thirty Years' War, everybody in the village was Protestant. After the war, other Christian denominations were tolerated, but they did not earn any special significance. To this day, most inhabitants are Evangelical.

== Politics ==
=== Municipal council ===
The council is made up of 6 council members, who were elected by majority vote at the municipal election held on 7 June 2009, and the honorary mayor as chairwoman.

=== Mayor ===
Homberg's mayor is Marc-Steffen Risch.

=== Coat of arms ===
The German blazon reads: In schräglinks geteiltem Schild vorne einen roten, blaubewehrten und -gezungten Löwen in Gold, hinten in schwarz ein silbernes Haus unter einem silbernen Jagdhorn.

The municipality's arms might in English heraldic language be described thus: Per bend sinister Or a lion rampant sinister gules armed and langued azure and sable a house under a bugle-horn both argent.

The lion charge on the dexter (armsbearer's right, viewer's left) side is a reference to the village's former allegiance to the Waldgraves and Rhinegraves. The charges on the sinister (armsbearer's left, viewer's right) side likewise refer to the former lords; the house is their old hunting lodge on the Schönbornerhof, and the bugle-horn – described as a “hunting horn” (Jagdhorn) in the German blazon – refers to their leisure pursuit. The arms have been borne since 1964 when they were approved by the Rhineland-Palatinate Ministry of the Interior.

== Culture and sightseeing ==
=== Buildings ===
The following are listed buildings or sites in Rhineland-Palatinate’s Directory of Cultural Monuments:

- Near Hauptstraße 20 – former fire engine house; one-floor stone block building, open bell frame, possibly from the mid 19th century, wooden gate from the 1920s

=== Clubs ===
Two clubs characterize Homberg's social life, the men's singing club, founded in 1909 and the gymnastic club, founded in 1922.

== Economy and infrastructure ==
=== Economic structure ===
Since the Second World War, the number of agricultural operations has shrunk greatly, although farmland has remained largely preserved. Thus, the operations that were still in business became bigger. Farming shifted from a primary income earner to a secondary one. In more recent years, though, some farms have been given up.

=== Education ===
As in other villages in the Amt of Grumbach that were thus affected by the Reformation, efforts also began in Homberg in the late 16th century to establish schools and teach children. People were to be given the ability to read the Bible for themselves. The general level of learning would thereby be raised. School attendance was at first voluntary. Regular lessons were likely only introduced in the earlier half of the 18th century. Only in 1909 did Homberg get its own schoolhouse with a teacher's dwelling. Until then, schoolchildren had had to attend classes in the neighbouring village of Herren-Sulzbach. The one-room school was dissolved in 1968. Thereafter, primary school pupils at first went to the Offenbach primary school and older students to the Hauptschule Offenbach-Sankt Julian. About 1980, there were further changes. Primary school pupils were then taught in Sankt Julian while Hauptschule students went to the Hauptschule Lauterecken, a few of whose classes were for a while housed at the Offenbach schoolhouse. The old Homburg schoolhouse, meanwhile, passed into private ownership. There were formerly opportunities to take commercial classes in Offenbach and Idar-Oberstein. Young farmers could attend agricultural schools in Meisenheim and Baumholder, and after local governmental restructuring in 1968, also in Kusel. Vocational training is now handled by the vocational schools in Kusel. Gymnasien are available in Lauterecken, Meisenheim and Kusel.
