= Wiesweiler =

- Municipality
- Coat of arms

- Location of Wiesweiler within Kusel district
- Interactive map of Wiesweiler
- Location within Germany Location within Rhineland-Palatinate
- Coordinates: 49°38′16″N 7°34′16″E
- Country: Germany
- State: Rhineland-Palatinate
- District: Kusel
- Municipal assoc.: Lauterecken-Wolfstein

Government
  - Mayor (2019–24): Ingfried Klahr

Area
  - Total: 3.33 km^{2} (1.29 sq mi)
- Elevation: 160 m (520 ft)

Population (2025-12-31)
  - Total: 374
  - Density: 112/km^{2} (291/sq mi)
- Time zone: UTC+01:00 (CET)
  - Summer (DST): UTC+02:00 (CEST)
- Postal codes: 67744
- Dialling codes: 06382
- Vehicle registration: KUS
- Website: www.wiesweiler.de

Wiesweiler is an Ortsgemeinde – a municipality belonging to a Verbandsgemeinde, a kind of collective municipality – in the Kusel district in Rhineland-Palatinate, Germany. It belongs to the Verbandsgemeinde Lauterecken-Wolfstein.

== Geography ==
=== Location ===
Wiesweiler lies on the river Glan in the Western Palatinate. Unlike neighbouring places on the Glan, Wiesweiler was not built at the lower end of a side valley opening into the Glan valley, but rather right on the valley's slopes. The ridge to the east is made up of several peaks that run together from the Königsberg (mountain, not the former East Prussian city) to Lauterecken, while to the west, the ridge is made up of several outliers of a mountain north of Deimberg.

Wiesweiler lies at an elevation of roughly 165 m above sea level downstream from Offenbach-Hundheim and upstream from the town of Lauterecken. The elevations either side of the Glan reach about 320 m above sea level. The municipal area measures 333 ha, of which 11 ha is settled and 24 ha is wooded.

=== Neighbouring municipalities ===
Wiesweiler borders in the northeast on the town of Lauterecken, in the east on the municipality of Lohnweiler, in the south on the municipality of Offenbach-Hundheim, in the southwest on the municipality of Buborn and in the northwest on the municipality of Hausweiler.

=== Constituent communities ===
Wiesweiler's Ortsteile are Wiesweiler on the Glan's left bank and the formerly self-administering village of Berschweiler on its right bank.

=== Municipality’s layout ===
The original villages were each laid out in the form of linear villages (by some definitions, thorpes) running parallel to the river, the road and the railway line. The church stands on the Glan's right bank on the way out of the former village of Berschweiler to the south. The former school building stands in the middle of the part of the village on the Glan's left bank, and the old mill on the right towards the village's north end. A bridge across the Glan in the mill area links the two formerly self-administering villages. The former railway station stands on the left bank, about 50 m up from the bridge. Many of the old houses are Einfirsthäuser (“one-roof-ridge houses”, or Quereinhäuser – combination residential and commercial houses divided for these two purposes down the middle, perpendicularly to the street), making it clear that this was once a farming village.

Berschweiler's historical built-up area, which comprises only a few properties, is grouped around Kirchenstrasse (“Church Street”) with focal points on the south side of the mediaeval churchyard and on both sides of the street leading to the bridge. Predominant are the Quereinhäuser of various sizes, some of which have been expanded into corner houses, with some with the gable facing the street and others with the eaves at the front. With one exception, these all come from the 19th century. In the more heavily settled Wiesweiler, too, the historical built-up area, made up of great Quereinhäuser and homesteads, comes mainly from the 19th century. It is grouped around the crossroads formed by the old road across the Glan valley and the highway that runs along it. In the northern sloped area, a second row of buildings has developed. Since the end of the 19th century, the village's growth has taken place mainly along Bergstrasse, which snakes its way up the slope.

== History ==
=== Antiquity ===
Berschweiler in the east may be the older of the two Ortsteile. The road running through the valley, Aschbacher Weg, links with the Roman road running over the Königsberg and into the Landstuhler Niederung (a depression) and may once further have been a link by way of Wiesweiler to the Roman road between Tholey and Bad Kreuznach.

It is certain that Wiesweiler's surrounding area was already settled in prehistoric times. In Roman times, a villa rustica stood where the village now lies, whose foundations were discovered as early as 1855 on the Glan's right bank underneath the mill. Unearthed were, among other things, bricks, potsherds and a kind of stone altar, but nothing of any particular importance. There was another archaeological dig in 1897, which was not particularly successful. Roman spolia at the church also make it clear that the area was settled in Roman times.

=== Middle Ages ===
When it was that Wiesweiler and Berschweiler first arose is something that is not known with any certainty. They may well have arisen before the year 1000. Both villages originally lay in the Nahegau, which beginning in the 12th century split itself up into various “undercounties” (Untergrafschaften), and it is difficult to know which one or ones the two villages belonged to. As early as 1287, Wiesweiler had its first documentary mention in a document from the Hornbach Monastery, according to which the monastery's abbot confirmed for another monastery, Hane (or Hagen) near Kirchheimbolanden, an income in Wiswilre. This place, however, belonged to the Waldgravial-Rhinegravial Hochgericht auf der Heide (“High Court on the Heath”). Thus, Wiesweiler and Berschweiler belonged in the 13th century to two different lordships, but neither to the series of villages around Grumbach, with which Sponheim-Starkenburg and the Duchy of Palatinate-Zweibrücken were enfeoffed in 1363 and 1443 respectively. Wiesweiler, therefore, did not even belong to the Waldgraviate, but rather to the County of Veldenz, which was founded in the earlier half of the 12th century. A 1336 document states that Wiesweiler was then a Veldenz fief of the knight Emich vom Steine and his wife Hildegunt. This fief was expanded in 1366 to include the village of Berschweiler on the other side of the river Glan. In 1381, the record holds that Peter Hubenriß von Odenbach had received in Wiesweiler – but together with Berschweiler – half the late Emich vom Steine's fief from Count Heinrich III of Veldenz (1378–1389). The village on the Glan's right bank was then the seat of its own court, for in 1411, Friedrich III (1396–1444), the last count of the original County of Veldenz, enfeoffed one Clais von Kellenbach with the court again. In 1415, Friedrich III then enfeoffed his vassal, Syfrid von Oberstein, with the court along with other holdings – although this time without Berschweiler – with the Odenbach fief to confirm again the holding of Wiesweiler to the Lords Hubenriß von Odenbach in 1436. The family Hubenriß von Odenbach must then have passed their holdings in Wiesweiler on to the family Fust von Stromberg in the late 15th century. It is assumed that the other half of this fief remained in the Waldgraviate with Clais vom Stein's heirs.

Accordingly, Wiesweiler and Berschweiler were in the Late Middle Ages Veldenz holdings, sometimes together and sometimes asunder, and they were repeatedly granted as fiefs to the Waldgravial Knights vom Stein (“of the Stone”) and the family Hubenriß von Odenbach. Wiesweiler alone was for a short time also a Veldenz fief held by the Lords of Oberstein and the family Fust von Stromberg. While Berschweiler was for a time in the Late Middle Ages the seat of its own court, it otherwise belonged to the court of Hinzweiler in the Eßweiler Tal (dale). Wiesweiler may have been in the Hochgericht auf der Heide on into the 16th century.

=== Modern times ===
After the time of the Reformation, the two villages’ histories generally followed a common path. Under the Treaty of Marburg signed on 18 November 1543, both villages passed to the County Palatine of Veldenz, later Veldenz-Lützelstein, which Count Palatine Wolfgang had set up for his uncle, Ruprecht, and whose residence town was held to be Lauterecken. The founding of this new county was a courtesy for Ruprecht, who as Wolfgang's guardian in his younger years, along with Wolfgang's mother Anna, had administered the Duchy of Palatinate-Zweibrücken. This did not change any of the feudal arrangements among the lower nobility at first. Wiesweiler was at this time held as a fief by the family Fust von Stromberg, whereas Berschweiler was likewise held by the Lords vom Stein. The family Fust von Stromberg sold Wiesweiler, likely in 1557, to the Waldgraves and Rhinegraves. Since the Counts Palatine of Zweibrücken were Wiesweiler's supreme fiefholders, there was no basis in law for this sale, and therefore in 1558, Waldgrave and Rhinegrave Philipp Franz forsook his rights and claims in Wiesweiler in favour of Duke Wolfgang of Zweibrücken, but Philipp Franz's loss was offset somewhat by Wolfgang's payment of an indemnity amounting to 500 Gulden. Beginning at this time, the village belonged to the Schultheißerei of Lauterecken in the like-named Oberamt. Wolfgang transferred the village forthwith to Veldenz-Lützelstein, in line with the terms of the Treaty of Marburg. Count Palatine Ruprecht, meanwhile, had died, and Georg Hans (b. 1543) had succeeded him, with Duke Wolfgang ruling as his administrator before his coming of age. In Berschweiler, the Lords of Kellenbach still held certain rights until the old feudal order was swept away in Napoleonic times, first and foremost rights to the forest.

Like most Glan-area villages, Wiesweiler and Berschweiler, too, suffered much in the 17th century's wars, both the Thirty Years' War and King Louis XIV's wars. Nevertheless, the nearby residence town of Lauterecken offered the villagers shelter during the Thirty Years' War. Lauterecken was not conquered. Nonetheless, death reaped a rich harvest there through hunger and the Plague.

In 1694, the County Palatine of Veldenz-Lützelstein was left without a ruler by the last ruling County Palatine, Leopold Ludwig's death. There then arose a dispute over it as to whether it – along with the villages of Wiesweiler and Berschweiler – should pass to the Electorate of the Palatinate or the Duchy of Palatinate-Zweibrücken. First, the Duchy, which then was ruled by King Charles XI of Sweden, took the Ämter of Veldenz and Lauterecken and the Remigiusberg into its ownership. Then, in 1697, Electorate of the Palatinate troops showed up and the Amt of Lauterecken and the two villages on the Glan were thereafter ruled by the Electorate of the Palatinate. A permanent solution to the dispute came only in 1733 in the so-called Succession Treaty of Mannheim, which resolved the situation in the Electorate of the Palatinate's favour.

While the two villages were nominally united as of 1558, only in the course of the 18th century did they finally grow together, all the while recovering from the various wars’ ravages. During the Middle Ages, Berschweiler had been held to be the more important village, but now Wiesweiler was gaining in importance. Johann Goswin Widder wrote in his 1788 work Geographische Beschreibung der Kur=Pfalz: “These two places together make only for a slight village. They lie on the Glan half an hour upstream from Lauterecke to the south, Bersweiler on its right side and Winsweiler on its left. Neither from the one nor from the other does one come across reliable, older information, leading to the presumption that such primarily only small hamlets as these, subservient to Castle Lauterecke, have since grown into one village community. The Glan drives a camerally-hereditary mill on its right bank. Through Bersweiler also runs the road leading from Mainz by way of Kreuznach, Meisenheim to Zweibrücken and into Lorraine, which is why a toll is imposed in the village.”

==== Recent times ====
During the time of the French Revolution and Napoleonic French rule, the Rhine’s left bank, and thereby Wiesweiler and Berschweiler too, were ceded to France. By this time, the two villages had been bound fast into one, under the name Wiesweiler. The village belonged to the Canton of Grumbach and the Mairie (“Mayoralty”) of Offenbach, as well as to the Arrondissement of Birkenfeld and the Department of Sarre. As early as 1793, French Revolutionary troops marched into the Glan valley and stationed themselves in the villages around Grumbach. This led to assaults on the local population.

In 1816, Wiesweiler passed to the Principality of Lichtenberg, a newly created exclave of the Duchy of Saxe-Coburg-Saalfeld, which as of 1826 became the Duchy of Saxe-Coburg and Gotha. As part of this state, it passed in 1834 to the Kingdom of Prussia, which made this area into the Sankt Wendel district. Later, after the First World War, the Treaty of Versailles stipulated, among other things, that 26 of the Sankt Wendel district's 94 municipalities had to be ceded to the British- and French-occupied Saarland. The remaining 68 municipalities then bore the designation “Restkreis St. Wendel-Baumholder”, with the first syllable of Restkreis having the same meaning as in English, in the sense of “left over”. Wiesweiler belonged to this district until 1937, when it was transferred to the Birkenfeld district. In 1969, it was transferred, this time to the Kusel district, in which it remains today.

After the Second World War, the village lay at first within the Regierungsbezirk of Koblenz in the then newly founded state of Rhineland-Palatinate. In the course of administrative restructuring in Rhineland-Palatinate in 1968, the Amt of Grumbach was dissolved. Wiesweiler passed in 1972 to the then newly founded Verbandsgemeinde of Lauterecken, and at the same time also from the Regierungsbezirk of Koblenz to the newly founded Regierungsbezirk of Rheinhessen-Pfalz (the system of Regierungsbezirke in Rhineland-Palatinate has since been abolished).

The municipality of Wiesweiler celebrated its 675-year jubilee of first documentary mention in 2011, in line with information from writers Dolch and Greule holding that the village's first documentary mention was in a 1336 document, known from a 1440 copy, under the name Winsewilre. Investigation has since uncovered an earlier mention, under the name Wiswilre, as early as 1287 in a document from the Hornbach Monastery. This supposedly means that the municipality will be celebrating an 800-year jubilee of first documentary mention in 2087.

=== Population development ===
The village has remained to this day rurally structured. In earlier times, besides agriculture, wool weaving was a means of earning a living. Even today, the municipal area is used for agriculture. However, other opportunities for a livelihood are mostly lacking in Wiesweiler. As early as 1955, 173 out of the 179 villagers engaged in the workforce had to commute to jobs outside the village. Wiesweiler's location near the town of Lauterecken long kept its population level relatively steady, until 2000. Ever since, as in other villages in the area, a serious drop has been noted.

The following table shows population development over the centuries for Wiesweiler:

Year	1788	1815	1860	1900	1925	1958	2000	2007	2010
Total	156	269	465	527	523	594	600	456	451

=== Municipality’s names ===
==== Wiesweiler ====
In the copy of the 1336 document, which was made out sometime about 1440, and in an original 1366 document, the village is named each time as Winsewilre. Other names that the village has borne over the ages are Winsswilr (1393), Wyneswilre (1415), Wensewilre (1436), Winzewiller (1445), Wenßwiler (1477), Wentzweiller (1535) and Winßwiller (1578). In 1790, the form Weißweiler cropped up, which Dolch and Greule hold to be a wrongly interpreted High-Germanization. The placename ending —weiler is one that is quite widespread, and the prefix most likely comes from an early settler – possibly the village's founder – named Winso.

==== Berschweiler ====
The originally self-administering village was known as Bernswilre in 1364. Other names that the village has borne over the ages are Berswijlre uf dem Glane bi Winsewijlre (1366), Bersswilr (1393), daz gerichte zu Berßwilre (1411) and Berschweiller (1581 and 1643). From the analysis of the placename ending —weiler and the prefix Berni—, it would seem that the place must originally have been settled by a man named Berni.

== Religion ==
A church may have stood in the Ortsteil of Berschweiler beginning in the Middle Ages; a Romanesque tower still stands today. It is unlikely that each village was a parish in its own right. Wiesweiler and Berschweiler could have belonged for a time to different parishes. When the village belonged to Palatinate-Zweibrücken, it was subject to the Zweibrücken church organization in the Electorate of the Palatinate. In 1537, the Reformation was introduced. Electorate of the Palatinate promoted the reintroduction of Catholicism quite early on, but the effect of this on Wiesweiler was only slight. Nevertheless, the house of worship was already a simultaneous church by 1684, before the Electorate of the Palatinate rule.

It is unknown when the first church was built at the spot now occupied by the current church. The Romanesque tower still standing today may have been built in its original shape in the early 12th century. There were surely conversions in Late Gothic times. The original nave was torn down in 1818 and replaced with a new building. This remained standing even after the Second World War and was renovated in 1970 and 1971 to plans by a Trier architect. Under the current church organization, Wiesweiler is a branch of Offenbach in the Sankt Wendel church district of the Rhenish Church.

== Politics ==
=== Municipal council ===
The council is made up of 8 council members, who were elected by majority vote at the municipal election held on 7 June 2009, and the honorary mayor as chairman.

=== Mayor ===
Wiesweiler's mayor is Ingfried Klahr and his deputies are Ralf Schneider and Harald Brand.

=== Coat of arms ===
The municipality's arms might in English heraldic language be described thus: Per fess argent a demilion azure armed and langued gules, and a pale of the first between vert a lily of the first and gules a lozenge of the first charged with a cross Greek sable.

The charge in the upper field, the lion, is a reference to the village's former allegiance to the County of Veldenz. The lower field refers to the two once separate communities that grew together to form the current municipality, Wiesweiler and Berschweiler. The silver pale (vertical stripe) stands for the geographical division by the river Glan. The stylized flower on the dexter (armsbearer's right, viewer's left) side stands for the quarryman's (according to the municipality's website) or stonemason's (according to regionalgeschichte.net) trade, once common in the Ortsteil of Wiesweiler. The black cross on the silver lozenge (diamond shape) on the sinister (armsbearer's left, viewer's right) side represents the foundation of a churchtower built upon an ancient Roman place of worship in the Ortsteil of Berschweiler. The arms have been borne since 1964, when they were approved by the Rhineland-Palatinate Ministry of the Interior.

== Culture and sightseeing ==
=== Buildings ===
The following are listed buildings or sites in Rhineland-Palatinate’s Directory of Cultural Monuments:

- Evangelische Kirche, Kirchstraße 19 – two-part plastered building, 1970/1971, architects Otto Vogel, Trier, and W. Simon, Wiesweiler, post-Baroque portal, marked 1819; Romanesque quire tower, Roman spolia
- Kirchstraße, no number – stately corner estate complex; quarrystone dwelling wing marked 1547, expansion possibly in the 18th century
- Kirchstraße 1 – former mill; ample three-sided estate; nine-axis plastered building, 1880, stable-barn 1834; bridge built of hewn stone blocks, 1844
- Kirchstraße 9 – great corner estate, 1829; characterizes village's appearance

=== Regular events ===
Wiesweiler's kermis (church consecration festival) is held on the third weekend in September, while a Christmas Market is held on the first day of Advent. Old customs such as were once practised in all Glan-area villages are today hardly ever observed.

=== Clubs ===
- Angelsportverein – angling
- Bischoff-Club – cultural events, open-air concerts, group travel
- Dart-Club
- Evangelische Frauenhilfe – Evangelical Women's Aid
- Förderverein der Freiwilligen Feuerwehr – fire brigade promotional association
- Gesangverein – singing club
- Landfrauenverein – countrywomen's club
- Turn- und Sportverein mit Förderverein – gymnastic and sport club with promotional association
- VdK – advocacy group

== Economy and infrastructure ==
=== Economic structure ===
Besides agriculture, wool weaving was a means of earning a living in both the former villages that now make up Wiesweiler. This began as early as the 16th century and was always a cottage industry. The mill on the Glan's right bank was built in 1542 and long served the wool weavers as a walking mill. By the late 19th century, the wool weaving cottage industry could no longer keep up with competition from textile mills. Ever more workers were seeking jobs outside their villages. The only craft business in the village was for a long time a major carpentry operation. After the Second World War, both the number of agricultural operations and the total land area used for agriculture shrank sharply.

=== Education ===
It is highly likely that there were already efforts underway in Wiesweiler as early as the 16th century to teach the village children to read and write, as the Counts Palatine of Zweibrücken had introduced the Reformation and were interested in putting the country's children in the position of being able to read the Bible. Classes were held in an ordinary house. The first known teacher, who was actually not a teacher by training, was named Molitor. He was followed by Anton Dessauer, who was, at least, a trained educator, unlike Molitor. He was the son of a teacher from neighbouring Offenbach. Only in 1862 did Wiesweiler get its own schoolhouse, at first a one-room school, but in 1886, a second class was added. This building still stands today, although the school was dissolved in 1968. The last teacher was Gustav Wommer. Nowadays, schoolchildren attend the primary school and Hauptschule in Lauterecken; between 1969 and 2010, primary schoolchildren had had to attend the Grumbach-Hoppstädten primary school. It is also possible to attend Gymnasium in Lauterecken.

=== Transport ===
Running through the village is Bundesstraße 420, which runs from Oppenheim to Neunkirchen in the Saarland. The stretch of the Glantalbahn (railway) running through Wiesweiler (Bad Münster am Stein–Homburg, opened in 1904) has been closed since 1985. The former railway station is now under private ownership. Visitors may, however, from spring to autumn, ride draisines on the track. Serving Lauterecken, only 2 km away, is Lauterecken-Grumbach station on the Lautertalbahn. Neighbouring Offenbach lies just under 3 km away while Kusel station at the district seat lies some 25 km away, but even so, it is relatively easy to reach on public transport given the good bus connections. The Autobahn interchanges near Kusel and Kaiserslautern each lie some 30 km away.
