= Buborn =

- Municipality
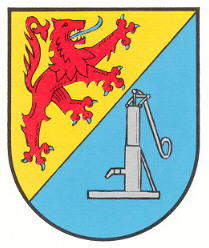
- Coat of arms

- Location of Buborn within Kusel district
- Interactive map of Buborn
- Location within Germany Location within Rhineland-Palatinate
- Coordinates: 49°38′11″N 7°32′28″E
- Country: Germany
- State: Rhineland-Palatinate
- District: Kusel
- Municipal assoc.: Lauterecken-Wolfstein

Government
  - Mayor (2019–24): Philipp Kreischer

Area
  - Total: 2.87 km^{2} (1.11 sq mi)
- Elevation: 300 m (980 ft)

Population (2025-12-31)
  - Total: 115
  - Density: 40.1/km^{2} (104/sq mi)
- Time zone: UTC+01:00 (CET)
  - Summer (DST): UTC+02:00 (CEST)
- Postal codes: 67742
- Dialling codes: 06382
- Vehicle registration: KUS
- Website: www.vg-lw.de

Buborn is an Ortsgemeinde – a municipality belonging to a Verbandsgemeinde, a kind of collective municipality – in the Kusel district in Rhineland-Palatinate, Germany. It belongs to the Verbandsgemeinde Lauterecken-Wolfstein.

== Geography ==
=== Location ===
The municipality lies in the North Palatine Uplands in the Western Palatinate. The village sits at an elevation of roughly 280 m above sea level in a hollow on the banks of the Rötelbach at the edge of a plateau. Elevations around the village reach heights of about 350 m above sea level. The municipal area measures 287 ha, of which 6 ha is settled and 40 ha is wooded.

=== Neighbouring municipalities ===
Buborn borders in the northeast on the municipality of Hausweiler, in the southeast on the municipality of Wiesweiler, in the south on the municipality of Offenbach-Hundheim, in the west on the municipality of Deimberg and in the northwest on the municipality of Herren-Sulzbach. Buborn also meets the municipality of Grumbach at a single point in the north.

=== Constituent communities ===
Also belonging to Buborn are three outlying Aussiedlerhöfe (a farming settlement established most often after the Second World War).

=== Municipality’s layout ===
Buborn is a clump village that has been thrust together, one with old buildings, and with a north-south through road cutting through it. The small graveyard lies at the village's south end. All together, there is very little in the way of new building.

== History ==
=== Antiquity ===
While it is assumed that the area around the village was already settled in prehistoric times, there are no archaeological finds bearing witness to this. What is known, however, is that the foundations of a Roman villa rustica are to be found within the municipality. Unearthed there were wall remnants, urns and pots from Roman times. In this vicinity, too, it is likely that a village known as Guckenhausen later lay, although it is not thought that this represents a continuity in settlement from Roman times to the Early Middle Ages.

=== Middle Ages ===
It is likely that Buborn arose in the later expansion phase that took hold in this area, thus in the 10th or 11th century. Until the early 12th century, the village belonged to the Nahegau, and then to the County of the Waldgraves, who can be considered the Nahegau counts’ successors. From a judicial point of view, Buborn lay within the jurisdiction of the Hochgericht auf der Heide (“High Court on the Heath”). Records tell of a knight named Albert from the Nahegau, who in the early 12th century unrightfully took ownership of the Remigiusberg (a mountain with a like-named monastery). Later, though, after the monks had bought the mountain back, Albert himself took orders at the newly founded monastery there, and, among other things, bequeathed two estates in Buhrbur to it.

In 1319, the Waldgraves of Kyrburg raised a claim to the jurisdiction in Buborn, which also stretched out to the surrounding villages. At the Kyrburger Hof, an estate held by the Waldgraves of Kyrburg in the Buborn area, the Waldgraves held court (they called it the Eicher Gericht). No sooner had Buborn ended up in the Waldgraves’ hands than a whole series of surrounding villages subject to the Hochgericht auf der Heide were pledged by Johann von Dhaun to the County of Sponheim-Starkenburg. It is known, however, that the village itself was pledged at this time as Hof in Bopporn (Hof means “estate”) to Reinfried von Reipoltskirchen. The exact date of the deed is unknown. Nevertheless, Buborn was in his hands in 1408 when Waldgrave Gerhard V died. The pledge was further passed on in 1431 to Friedrich von Rüdesheim, Reinfried von Reipoltskirchen's son-in-law. Shortly thereafter, the Waldgraves must have redeemed the pledge, for in 1448, Waldgrave and Rhinegrave Gottfried zu Dhaun sold the village, along with others in the Grumbacher Tal (dale), while reserving the right to buy them back, to Count Palatine Stephan of Zweibrücken. The Waldgraves exercised this right in 1477. It is likely that in the early 16th century, Buborn belonged to the Waldgraves and Rhinegraves of Grumbach. In 1515, Buborn was firmly in this county's hands, and the Waldgraves and Rhinegraves of Grumbach thereby also held the jurisdiction. From this year comes a Weistum that states that both jurisdiction (that is, the court's power) and the lordship were held not by Kyrburg, but rather by Grombach (a Weistum – cognate with English wisdom – was a legal pronouncement issued by men learned in law in the Middle Ages and early modern times).

The village's mediaeval history, just like neighbouring Herren-Sulzbach’s and the Schönborner Hof’s, is tightly bound with the Knights of Saint John. The order’s original seat was the Schönborner Hof (estate) near Homberg, before later moving to Herren-Sulzbach, and later still, in the 14th century, to their new administrative hub in Buborn, where they built a manor building that they then called the Commenturhof (“Commendator's Estate”). The land where this once stood is today known in Buborn as the Kirchgarten (“Church Garden”).

The origin of the Knights of Saint John was a hospital for pilgrims and the sick in Jerusalem. Raymond du Puy de Provence (1083-1160), the order's first Grand Master (1120-1160) enacted sometime about 1155 the order's first constitution. The order first quickly spread in Mediterranean Europe. Beginning in 1137, the Knights also took on the task of armed border protection, thereby becoming an ecclesiastical knightly order. In 1309, the order founded on the island of Rhodes a sovereign knightly state. After the Reformation there was, besides the original Catholic branch a new Protestant branch, the Bailiwick of Brandenburg of the Chivalric Order of Saint John of the Hospital at Jerusalem, which persists to this day. Since 1859, the Catholic branch has borne the name Order of Malta.

=== Modern times ===
The presence of Knights of Saint John also characterized the history in the 16th and 17th centuries. Until the time of the French Revolution, Buborn belonged to the Lordship of the Counts of Grumbach. During the Thirty Years' War, marauding troops repeatedly plundered the village, and only a few people survived the war. Likewise, the village suffered in French King Louis XIV's wars of conquest.

==== Recent times ====
During the time of the French Revolution and the Napoleonic era that followed, the German lands on the Rhine’s left bank were annexed by France. Buborn then belonged to the Mairie (“Mayoralty”) of Grumbach, which was the seat of a like-named canton, which itself belonged to the Arrondissement of Birkenfeld in the Department of Sarre (Département de la Sarre). In 1793, French Revolutionary troops advanced through the Glan valley and quartered themselves in villages near Grumbach, including Buborn, leading to abuses by the troops against the local populace. After French rule ended, the Congress of Vienna established the Principality of Lichtenberg in 1816, which was awarded as a newly created exclave to the Duchy of Saxe-Coburg-Saalfeld, which as of 1826 became the Duchy of Saxe-Coburg and Gotha. In 1834, the duchy sold this principality to the Kingdom of Prussia. Within Prussia's Rhine Province, it formed the district of Sankt Wendel, which was in turn divided into several Ämter. Within the district of Sankt Wendel, Buborn belonged to the Amt of Grumbach. Later, after the First World War, the Treaty of Versailles stipulated, among other things, that 26 of the Sankt Wendel district's 94 municipalities had to be ceded to the British- and French-occupied Saar. The remaining 68 municipalities then bore the designation “Restkreis St. Wendel-Baumholder”, with the first syllable of Restkreis having the same meaning as in English, in the sense of “left over”. Buborn belonged to this district until 1937, when it was transferred to the Birkenfeld district. In 1969, it was transferred, this time to the Kusel district, in which it remains today. After the Second World War, the village at first lay within the Regierungsbezirk of Koblenz in the then newly founded state of Rhineland-Palatinate. In the course of administrative restructuring in Rhineland-Palatinate in 1968, the Amt of Grumbach was dissolved. On New Year's Day 1972, Buborn passed to the newly founded Verbandsgemeinde of Lauterecken, and at the same time from the Regierungsbezirk of Koblenz to the newly founded Regierungsbezirk of Rheinhessen-Pfalz, which has since been dissolved.

=== Population development ===
The village has a rural structure to this day. Until a few decades ago, most of the villagers earned their livelihoods in agriculture. Besides farmers, there were also farmhands, forestry workers, quarrymen and a few craftsmen. There were hardly any other jobs to be had. Even today, the municipal area is under agricultural use. Nevertheless, a great number of people in Buborn need to seek work outside the village. As early as 1955, out of 52 members of the workforce, 46 held jobs outside the village. Worthy of note is that Buborn's population rose less markedly than neighbouring Homberg's in the course of the 19th century, and since the turn of the 20th century, Buborn's population has remained hardly changed.

The following table shows population development over the centuries for Buborn:

| Year | 1815 | 1860 | 1900 | 1925 | 1958 | 2010 |
| Total | 119 | 151 | 182 | 188 | 158 | 160 |

=== Municipality’s name ===
About 1120, the village was mentioned in a document as Burbur, and in a 1290 original document as Hof zu Bopure (the first two words meaning “estate at”). The name's form underwent a number of changes in older documents: Buhrbur (1127), Buppura (1152 and 1154), Potbor (1315), Butbure (1351), Boppren (1459), and in the local speech Buwere. Only in 1797 did the current name Buborn appear. The first syllable is drawn from a personal name, “Burdo” or “Burto”, while the placename ending, although resembling the common placename ending —born, apparently does not mean “spring”, but rather “house” or “dwelling” (the root still appears in the German word Vogelbauer, meaning “birdcage”, and it even has a cognate in English: “bower”). Thus, the name may be interpreted as meaning “Burdo’s house”.

=== Vanished villages ===
Rural cadastral names within Buborn's limits point to a former village named “Guckenhausen”. This village, whose former existence is only assumed, may well have been older than Buborn, but its name never appears in any mediaeval documents, but rather is only attested in these rural names. The ending means “house” while the prefix is drawn from a personal name, “Gucko” or “Kucko”. Thus, the name may be interpreted as meaning “Gucko’s house” or “Gucko’s small settlement”.

== Religion ==
From the Early Middle Ages, Buborn belonged to the parish of the neighbouring village of Herren-Sulzbach. Buborn has never had its own church. Beginning in the 14th century, though, the Knights of Saint John kept their administrative seat here. The Order also owned considerable lands, and had likewise established a location in Meisenheim. In the time of the Reformation, the Knights lost all their influence in the parish of Herren-Sulzbach. In 1556, the Reformation was introduced into Buborn, and then, that same year, the Knights, under their Grand Master, Prince Georg von Schilling, first pledged the greater part of their holdings to the Lordship of the Grumbachs under Rhinegrave Philipp Franz. In the early 17th century, the Grumbachs gained full ownership of these pledged holdings and paid a price of 3,200 Gulden. In 1606, the Commenturhof at Buborn likewise passed into the Grumbachs’ ownership, only to be forthwith passed by them to landholder Boso Strauß von Herren-Sulzbach, receiving in return from him the Schönborner Hof. Although the Knights of Saint John kept up their presence in the domains of the Evangelical Church, they could no longer hold their own in Herren-Sulzbach. In the Waldgravial-Rhinegravial House of Grumbach, the Evangelical parish of Herren-Sulzbach was founded in 1556. Belonging thereto right from the beginning were all villages in the Amt of Grumbach but the ones lying on the river Glan. Until the Thirty Years' War, all villagers were Evangelical. Later, the lordship had to tolerate other denominations, although thus far none has gained any truly meaningful numbers.

== Politics ==
=== Municipal council ===
The council is made up of 6 council members, who were elected by majority vote at the municipal election held on 7 June 2009, and the honorary mayor as chairman.

=== Mayor ===
Buborn's mayor is Philipp Kreischer.

=== Coat of arms ===
The municipality's arms might be described thus: Per bend sinister Or a lion rampant sinister gules armed and langued azure and azure a handpump-well argent.

The lion charge on the dexter (armsbearer's right, viewer's left) side is an heraldic device formerly borne by the village's mediaeval lords, the Waldgraves. The charge on the sinister (armsbearer's left, viewer's right) side, the handpump-well, is a canting element and refers to the latter syllable in the village's name, —born, which, although historically referring to a spring, can also refer to a well (the more usual form is Brunnen). This is, nevertheless, a false assumption. Historically, the last syllable in the village's name refers to a dwelling, not a well.

The arms have been borne since 23 July 1964 when they were approved by Rhineland-Palatinate’s Ministry of the Interior.

== Culture and sightseeing ==
=== Regular events ===
Buborn’s kermis (church consecration festival) is held each year on the third weekend in July. Old customs, such as were formerly practised in all villages in the Glan region, are seldom if at all observed today.

=== Clubs ===
Buborn has long enjoyed its men’s singing club and its gymnastic club.

== Economy and infrastructure ==
=== Economic structure ===
In the time following the Second World War, the number of agricultural operations shrank dramatically, though lands useful to agriculture remained mostly intact. The farming operations that did not shut down therefore expanded. Primary occupations, though, became secondary occupations. For the last decade or so, however, farms have gradually been being given up.

=== Education ===
As in all the other villages in the Amt of Grumbach, there likewise arose in Buborn in the late 16th century, owing to the effect of the Reformation, efforts to teach children to read and write. At first, though, schoolchildren had to attend classes in neighbouring Herren-Sulzbach. There, lessons for all the parish’s schoolchildren were taught at a herdsman’s house. Only about 1814 did every village get its own school. Buborn’s tiny schoolroom was only equipped with two tables. A further, smaller room next door served the teacher as a dwelling. Only in 1865 did the municipality have its own one-room schoolhouse built. On this schoolhouse hung a bell with the inscription “Wer mich nimmt verliert” (“He who takes me loses”). This warning was even enough to dissuade the Nazis from seizing the bell to use its metal in the war effort, and unlike many other bells, it was still there by the time the Second World War ended. The one-room schoolhouse lasted until the late 1960s. Thereafter, primary school pupils attended the Grumbach-Hoppstädten primary school, which itself lasted until 2010, whereas the Hauptschule students began attending school in Lauterecken right away. Once the old primary school closed, the primary school pupils, too, began attending school there. The Lauterecken Gymnasium’s buildings stand only a few kilometres from Buborn.

=== Transport ===
Buborn lies on Kreisstraße (District Road) 37, which links it to Bundesstraße 270. To the southeast runs Bundesstraße 420, which can be reached over Kreisstraßen 37 and then 63. The nearest Autobahn interchange, near Kusel, is 25 km away. Serving Lauterecken, some 5 km away, is a railway station on the Lautertalbahn.
