= Lauterecken (Verbandsgemeinde) =

Collective municipality in Rhineland-Palatinate, Germany

Coordinates: 49.649°N 7.592°E

Lauterecken is a former Verbandsgemeinde ("collective municipality") in the district of Kusel, Rhineland-Palatinate, Germany. The seat of the Verbandsgemeinde was in Lauterecken. On 1 July 2014 it merged into the new Verbandsgemeinde Lauterecken-Wolfstein.

The Verbandsgemeinde Lauterecken consisted of the following Ortsgemeinden ("local municipalities"):

1. Adenbach
2. Buborn
3. Cronenberg
4. Deimberg
5. Ginsweiler
6. Glanbrücken
7. Grumbach
8. Hausweiler
9. Heinzenhausen
10. Herren-Sulzbach
11. Hohenöllen
12. Homberg
13. Hoppstädten
15. Kappeln
16. Kirrweiler
17. Langweiler
18. Lauterecken
19. Lohnweiler
20. Medard
21. Merzweiler
22. Nerzweiler
23. Odenbach
24. Offenbach-Hundheim
25. Sankt Julian
26. Unterjeckenbach
27. Wiesweiler
