= Lauterecken-Wolfstein =

Collective municipality in Rhineland-Palatinate, Germany

- Verbandsgemeinde
- Location of Lauterecken-Wolfstein within Kusel district
- Interactive map of Lauterecken-Wolfstein
- Location within Germany Location within Rhineland-Palatinate
- Coordinates: 49°39′N 7°36′E
- Country: Germany
- State: Rhineland-Palatinate
- District: Kusel
- Seat: Lauterecken
- Subdivisions: 41 municipalities

Area
  - Total: 238.14 km^{2} (91.95 sq mi)

Population (2025-12-31)
  - Total: 17,447
  - Density: 73.264/km^{2} (189.75/sq mi)
- Time zone: UTC+01:00 (CET)
  - Summer (DST): UTC+02:00 (CEST)
- Website: www.vg-lw.de

Lauterecken-Wolfstein is a Verbandsgemeinde ("collective municipality") in the district of Kusel, Rhineland-Palatinate, Germany. The seat of the Verbandsgemeinde is in Lauterecken. It was formed on 1 July 2014 by the merger of the former Verbandsgemeinden Lauterecken and Wolfstein.

The Verbandsgemeinde Lauterecken-Wolfstein consists of the following Ortsgemeinden ("local municipalities"):

1. Adenbach
2. Aschbach
3. Buborn
4. Cronenberg
5. Deimberg
6. Einöllen
7. Eßweiler
8. Ginsweiler
9. Glanbrücken
10. Grumbach
11. Hausweiler
12. Hefersweiler
13. Heinzenhausen
14. Herren-Sulzbach
15. Hinzweiler
16. Hohenöllen
17. Homberg
18. Hoppstädten
19. Jettenbach
20. Kappeln
21. Kirrweiler
22. Kreimbach-Kaulbach
23. Langweiler
24. Lauterecken
25. Lohnweiler
26. Medard
27. Merzweiler
28. Nerzweiler
29. Nußbach
30. Oberweiler im Tal
31. Oberweiler-Tiefenbach
32. Odenbach
33. Offenbach-Hundheim
34. Reipoltskirchen
35. Relsberg
36. Rothselberg
37. Rutsweiler an der Lauter
38. Sankt Julian
39. Unterjeckenbach
40. Wiesweiler
41. Wolfstein
