= Deimberg =

- Municipality
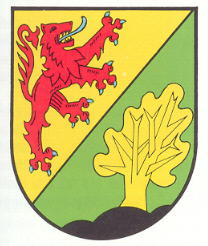
- Coat of arms

- Location of Deimberg within Kusel district
- Interactive map of Deimberg
- Location within Germany Location within Rhineland-Palatinate
- Coordinates: 49°37′36″N 7°31′2″E
- Country: Germany
- State: Rhineland-Palatinate
- District: Kusel
- Municipal assoc.: Lauterecken-Wolfstein

Government
  - Mayor (2019–24): Susanne Heer

Area
  - Total: 2.08 km^{2} (0.80 sq mi)
- Elevation: 360 m (1,180 ft)

Population (2025-12-31)
  - Total: 98
  - Density: 47/km^{2} (120/sq mi)
- Time zone: UTC+01:00 (CET)
  - Summer (DST): UTC+02:00 (CEST)
- Postal codes: 67742
- Dialling codes: 06387
- Vehicle registration: KUS
- Website: deimberg.de

Deimberg is an Ortsgemeinde – a municipality belonging to a Verbandsgemeinde, a kind of collective municipality – in Kusel, a district in Rhineland-Palatinate, Germany. It belongs to the Verbandsgemeinde Lauterecken-Wolfstein.

== Geography ==
=== Location ===
The municipality lies on the heights west of Offenbach-Hundheim in the Western Palatinate. The village stretches over the edge of a mountain hollow at an elevation of some 380 m above sea level. The Deimberger Höfchen, an outlying homestead, lies at 345 m above sea level almost 1 km northeast of the village on the Offenbach-Homberg road, Kreisstraße 63. The municipal area measures 209 ha, of which roughly 4 ha is settled and 19 ha is wooded.

=== Neighbouring municipalities ===
Deimberg borders in the north on the municipality of Herren-Sulzbach, in the east on the municipality of Buborn, in the southeast on the municipality of Offenbach-Hundheim, in the south on the municipality of Glanbrücken, in the southwest on the municipality of Sankt Julian and in the west on the municipality of Kirrweiler.

=== Constituent communities ===
Also belonging to Deimberg is the outlying homestead of Deimberger Höfchen.

== History ==
=== Antiquity ===
The broader Deimberg area was likely settled in prehistoric and Roman times, although no archaeological finds confirming this have yet come to light in either the village or the outlying countryside.

=== Middle Ages ===
In 1350 documents mentioned a man named Heynemann Lole from Deimberg, who described himself as "Herr von Deimsberg" ("Lord of Deimsberg"). Cropping up later were the families Esch and Opp, from among whom sprang Schöffen (roughly "lay jurists") and censors. The Deimberger Hof was owned by the Waldgraves and Rhinegraves. It was for a time worked by Peter Opp and his heirs. According to writer Fabricius, the village belonged to the Gericht auf der Höhe ("Court on the Heights"), which was to be considered a subdivision within the Hochgericht auf der Heide ("High Court on the Heath"). The Gericht auf der Höhe was named when, in 1258, Castle Grumbach and its outlying lands were transferred to the Waldgraves and Rhinegraves of Dhaun. The villages within the court region, among which was Dynberg, appeared in 1363 in a document about the pledging of these lands to the County of Sponheim-Starkenburg. Then in a 1443 document, according to which the "poor people of Grumbach"were transferred to Frederick III, Count of Veldenz and Sponheim, the name Dyemberg cropped up. More precisely, the document dealt with a pledge that Rhinegrave Gottfried confirmed for Stephen, Count Palatine of Simmern-Zweibrücken, who inherited his father-in-law's territories when Frederick III died in 1444. The area of the "poor people of Grumbach", which was coterminous with the villages in the parish of Herren-Sulzbach, was redeemed by the lordship of Grumbach as early as 1477. Deimberg itself was even the object of exchanges in partitions and disputes among the various lines of the Waldgraves and Rhinegraves.

=== Modern times ===
Of the village's fate in the wars that followed, little is known. The annals from the Thirty Years' War tell of a soldier woman's child who froze to death, and of a beggar child who starved. The war and the Plague decimated the population. Deimberg, though, which was rather out of the way, seemed to come through the hardships rather better than many other villages. The local lore has it that when the Croats came through the area in 1635, Deimberg's inhabitants fled into the woods. French King Louis XIV's wars of conquest may also have brought suffering to Deimberg. Until the onset of the French Revolution, the village remained with the Rhinegraves of Grumbach.

==== Recent times ====
During the French Revolution and the Napoleonic era that followed, Deimberg belonged to the Mairie ("Mayoralty") of Grumbach within the Canton of Grumbach, the Arrondissement of Birkenfeld and the Department of Sarre. In 1816, Deimberg passed to the Principality of Lichtenberg, a newly created exclave of the Duchy of Saxe-Coburg-Saalfeld, which as of 1826 became the Duchy of Saxe-Coburg and Gotha. As part of this state, it passed in 1834 to the Kingdom of Prussia, which made this area into the Sankt Wendel district. Later, after the First World War, the Treaty of Versailles stipulated, among other things, that 26 of the Sankt Wendel district's 94 municipalities had to be ceded to the British- and French-occupied Saar. The remaining 68 municipalities then bore the designation "Restkreis St. Wendel-Baumholder", with the first syllable of Restkreis having the same meaning as in English, in the sense of "left over". Deimberg belonged to this district until 1937, when it was transferred to the Birkenfeld district. In 1969, it was transferred, this time to the Kusel district, in which it remains today. After the Second World War, the village at first lay within the Regierungsbezirk of Koblenz in the then newly founded state of Rhineland-Palatinate. In the course of administrative restructuring in Rhineland-Palatinate in 1968, the Amt of Grumbach was dissolved, and in 1972, Deimberg passed to the then newly founded Verbandsgemeinde of Lauterecken, and at the same time from the Regierungsbezirk of Koblenz to the Regierungsbezirk of Rheinhessen-Pfalz (Regierungsbezirke nowadays no longer exist in Rhineland-Palatinate).

=== Population development ===
The village has remained to this day rurally structured. In earlier days, many inhabitants were quarrymen at the sandstone quarries near the village. Back then, stonemasonry was already being practised. Other villagers earned their livelihoods as travelling musicians (Wandermusikanten). There were farmers, agricultural workers and forestry workers, but hardly any craftsmen. Even in the past, when the neighbouring villages were still extensively characterized by agriculture, most people in Deimberg had to seek work outside the village. As early as 1955 there were 47 commuters among the 56 people in the workforce. This is one reason for the fast shrinking population figures today. There are now only five long established families left in Deimberg.

The following table shows population development since Napoleonic times for Deimberg:

Year	1815	1860	1900	1925	1958	2007
Total	79	146	182	210	187	103

=== Municipality’s name ===
The village's name was witnessed only rather late, and has not cropped up very often: Dimberg in 1336, Dynberg in 1363, Dyemberg in 1443, Dymbergk about 1500, Deimberg in 1600. Today's local vernacular form, which matches the name as it appears on a 1797 map, arose through the formation of an anaptyctic vowel –i– in the root word. Thus Deimberg became Deimbrig, then Deimberich, and then Deimerich. The name's first syllable may well stem from a personal name, Dido, which would have been Didin in the genitive case. With the disappearance of the intervocalic –d– arose the syllable Dîn–, and then with assimilation to the following –b–, the –n– shifted to –m–, yielding the form Dîmberg. Therefore, the village's name is reckoned to mean "Dido’s Mountain", even if this presumably Frankish man has been lost in the mists of time.

=== Vanished villages ===
According to the writer Karsch, the village of Deimberg was always mentioned in old documents in connection with another village by the name of Steinbäch(e)l, which had supposedly already vanished by the 15th century. According to this, Deimberg-Steinbächel was a single village but with two focal points. In the oldest documents in which Deimberg is mentioned, though, the vanished village of Steinbäch(e)l is not mentioned.

== Religion ==
Deimberg belonged to the Diocese of Mainz and lay within the parish of Herren-Sulzbach, later described as the Evangelical Parish of Herren-Sulzbach after the Waldgraves and Rhinegraves had introduced the Reformation in 1556. The villagers are mostly Evangelical; until the Thirty Years' War all the villagers were. Since 1956 Deimberg has had a small church. Formerly churchgoers attended services in Herren-Sulzbach.

== Politics ==
=== Municipal council ===
The council is made up of 6 council members, who were elected by majority vote at the municipal election held on 7 June 2009, and the honorary mayor as chairwoman.

=== Mayor ===
Deimberg's mayor is Susanne Heer, and her deputies are Martin Reidenbach and Christine Kreischer.

=== Coat of arms ===
The German blazon reads: Das Wappen zeigt in schräglinks geteiltem Schild vorne einen roten blaubewehrten und -gezungten Löwen in Gold, hinten in Grün einen schwarzen Dreiberg, darüber einen goldenen Eichbaum.

The municipality's arms might in English heraldic language be described thus: Per bend sinister Or a lion rampant gules armed and langued azure and vert issuant from base a mount of three sable upon which an oaktree of the first.

The charge on the dexter (armsbearer's right, viewer's left) side, the lion, is an heraldic device formerly borne by the region's lords, the Waldgraves and Rhinegraves. The tree on the sinister (armsbearer's left, viewer's right) side is a local, protected 200-year-old oak, the Brecheiche (“Breaking Oak”, so named as it was at this tree that flax was once broken). The mount of three (Dreiberg in German) is canting for the latter syllable of the municipality's name, –berg, which means "mountain".

The arms have been borne since 20 July 1964 when they were approved by the Rhineland-Palatinate Ministry of the Interior.

== Economy ==
The village's inhabitants were once mostly farmers, with some working in sandstone quarries nearby, and some still work in agriculture. From the late 19th century until the outbreak of the Second World War many men left the village to work as travelling musicians (Wandermusikanten).
