= Offenbach-Hundheim =

- Municipality
- Coat of arms

- Location of Offenbach-Hundheim within Kusel district
- Interactive map of Offenbach-Hundheim
- Location within Germany Location within Rhineland-Palatinate
- Coordinates: 49°37′25″N 7°33′04″E
- Country: Germany
- State: Rhineland-Palatinate
- District: Kusel
- Municipal assoc.: Lauterecken-Wolfstein

Government
  - Mayor (2019–24): Peter Stein

Area
  - Total: 7.91 km^{2} (3.05 sq mi)
- Elevation: 170 m (560 ft)

Population (2025-12-31)
  - Total: 977
  - Density: 124/km^{2} (320/sq mi)
- Time zone: UTC+01:00 (CET)
  - Summer (DST): UTC+02:00 (CEST)
- Postal codes: 67749
- Dialling codes: 06382
- Vehicle registration: KUS
- Website: www.offenbach-hundheim.de

Offenbach-Hundheim is an Ortsgemeinde – a municipality belonging to a Verbandsgemeinde, a kind of collective municipality – in the Kusel district in Rhineland-Palatinate, Germany. It belongs to the Verbandsgemeinde Lauterecken-Wolfstein.

== Geography ==
=== Location ===
The municipality lies in the broad valley of the river Glan in the Western Palatinate. The municipal area measures 971 ha, of which 78 ha is settled (roughly 42 ha in Offenbach and roughly 36 ha in Hundheim) and 45 ha is wooded.

==== Offenbach ====
Within this merged municipality's limits, the Ortsteil of Offenbach lies in the north on both sides of the Glan, although the village core nonetheless lies on the left bank. Here, the small stream known as the Gölschbach empties into the Glan. Within Offenbach, the Glan has a downstream drop of some 10 m from 174 m above sea level at the municipal limit with Glanbrücken to 164 m above sea level at the municipal limit with Wiesweiler. Above the village, the Kesselberg's broad slope on the river's left bank formed even after the Second World War an extensive vineyard area. There is now forest planted there. On the Glan's right bank, the mountains reach heights of almost 300 m above sea level (Feistenberg, 292 m) and on the left bank almost 350 m above sea level (Trimschenberg, 344 m).

==== Hundheim ====
Within Offenbach-Hundheim's limits, the Ortsteil of Hundheim lies south of the Glan in the valley of the Talbach, which here empties into the millrace feeding Offenbach's Klostermühle ("Monastery Mill"). The Glan riverbed near the bridge between Offenbach and Hundheim has been measured at 171.3 m above sea level. The Talbach has a downstream drop of some 10 m from the municipal limit with Nerzweiler to its mouth. To the east, the mountains reach heights of almost 300 m above sea level at the Feistenberg (see above) and in the west almost 250 m above sea level at the Dumpf (244.9 m).

=== Neighbouring municipalities ===
Offenbach-Hundheim borders in the north on the municipality of Wiesweiler, in the east on the municipality of Lohnweiler, in the southeast on the municipality of Aschbach, in the south on the municipality of Nerzweiler, in the southwest on the municipality of Glanbrücken, in the west on the municipality of Deimberg and in the northwest on the municipality of Buborn. Offenbach-Hundheim also meets the town of Wolfstein at a single point in the east.

=== Constituent communities ===
Offenbach-Hundheim's Ortsteile are Offenbach am Glan and Hundheim.

=== Municipality's layout ===
==== Offenbach ====
Offenbach was originally a linear village (by some definitions, a "thorpe") on the Glan's left bank, near which a monastery had arisen in the Gölschbach valley. The village spread out to the west towards the monastery and also towards the east across to the Glan's right bank, where the monastery's mill, the Klostermühle, stood. In 1906, the railway line began running between Dorfstraße ("Village Street") and the Glan, and in 1938, parallel to this, the approach road to what is today Bundesstraße 420. Between the road and the railway stands the former railway station, now used as a house, and on a linking street between the old village street and Bundesstraße 420 stands the former Evangelical schoolhouse. A former Catholic schoolhouse, built in 1844, stood on Klosterstraße ("Monastery Street"). North of the old monastery church stands the Catholic parish church, which was built in 1888 in the Gothic Revival style. A mediaeval timber-frame house on Hauptstraße ("Main Street") with a lovely oriel window has been preserved, and underneath the window is a grotesque face that was once part of the local pranger. New building zones arose on the Glan's right bank on gently sloping land and on the left bank, where the slope was somewhat steeper. There was also new building in the Gölschbach valley. Of the old monastery, all that was left by the 19th century was a shell, but was restored about 1894. Additions were made to the structure to strengthen it, and it now serves as the Evangelical parish church. Only sometime in the 15th century was this church ready for use. The remnant of the old monastery church is also a building that is important to art history, showing as it does the transition from Romanesque (in the quire) to Gothic architecture (on the west side), for the church was built in several stages and thus exhibits features of both periods. Just across the street from the monastery church stands the old Schaffneihaus ("Stewardship House") from which the monastery estate was administered by officials of the County Palatine of Zweibrücken in post-Reformation times. Today this building serves as a convent. An imposing new building across from the church's main portal is the new Evangelical parish hall. In the new building zone on the Glan's right bank, a new schoolhouse was built in 1967, originally intended as a central school for several villages, but it has since been given up as a school and is now used as a medical centre. Offenbach's graveyard lies in the Gölschbach valley on the road that leads to the villages on the heights. Two Jewish graveyards have also been preserved, the old graveyard outside the village on the Trimschenberg, and the "new" one, laid out in 1887, beside the former Hauptschule. Offenbach's sporting ground lies at the end of the new building zone on the Glan's right bank.

==== Hundheim ====
Hundheim lies in the Glan valley and on the lowest reaches of the Talbach. The village was originally a linear village (or "thorpe"), like Offenbach, lying on a road that swept round in a bow from the Glan valley (towards Hirsau Church, Hirsauer Kirche, an old country church, now no longer used, that still stands near Hundheim) to the Talbach. The village first spread to the southeastern mountain slope and to the Glan bridge, and then along the original road towards Nerzweiler. Last, it spread to the eastern mountain slope, where a new building zone sprang up. The most striking building is Hirsau Church mentioned above, standing in the west of the Glan valley in the middle of the old graveyard and built in the early 12th century. On the road that leads to the church stands the former schoolhouse with its Art Nouveau elements. It was built in 1907. Said to be a peculiarity is a farmhouse on Hirsauer Straße that was only built in 1926 and which deviates in composition and shape from other farmhouses found in the Westrich, an historic region that encompasses areas in both Germany and France. Hundheim has its own sporting ground, which lies near Hirsau Church.

== History ==
=== Antiquity ===
==== Offenbach ====
Going by the many prehistoric archaeological finds in the broader Offenbach area, it is clear that the village area was settled in both the Bronze Age and the Iron Age, and perhaps even in the New Stone Age. Finds from Gallo-Roman times have been unearthed in Offenbach itself, a gravestone, a household altar and a quern. These finds were formerly on display at the former provostry church, but are now kept in a lapidarium near the church.

==== Hundheim ====
Prehistoric archaeological finds in Hundheim itself cannot be directly confirmed, but just beyond the eastern municipal limit lie the prehistoric graves and find sites in the municipal areas of Wolfstein and Lohnweiler. Nevertheless, found at the Hirsauer Kirche near Hundheim are many spolia from Roman times. Possibly the best known of these is a relief showing a sword fighter (42 × 39 cm) in the nave's south wall. At the church's southwest corner is a sandstone block with finials on it (1.22 × 0.35 m). A further spolium with an angular pattern can be found at the northwest corner (56 × 22 cm). Within the church stands a square stone that shows a kantharos with a lily, flanked by two dolphins. It is uncertain whether these Roman stones are remnants of grave monuments, or whether a Roman temple once stood nearby.

=== Middle Ages ===
==== Offenbach ====
It can no longer be ascertained when today's village of Offenbach was founded. Places with names ending in —bach ("brook" in German) were founded over rather a long time, and it therefore makes little sense to speculate about the village's exact time of founding. It is known for certain, however, that the village already existed in 1150 (according to another source, however, Offenbach is mentioned in documents from 1128). Nevertheless, it might already have been quite old, even by then. According to the record in which Offenbach had its first documentary mention, Archbishop Heinrich of Mainz (1142-1153) acknowledged that the edelfrei nobleman Reinfried had donated a plot of land to Saint Vincent's Benedictine Abbey in Metz. The donated land lay near the village of Offenbach am Glan, and soon thereafter a new monastery was to spring up, an affiliated monastery of Saint Vincent's consecrated to the Virgin Mary. Building work on the abbey began in 1200. Reinfried became the Vogt of this monastery that he had endowed, and he held jurisdiction over the markets in Offenbach. Held in the village each year at that time were four markets, on New Year's Day, Easter Wednesday, Whitsunday and the Nativity of Mary (8 September). According to a later inscription at the Offenbach Monastery, the endower was styled Reinfried von Rüdesheim. This is thought to mean the village of Rüdesheim an der Nahe near Bad Kreuznach rather than the town of Rüdesheim am Rhein. Whichever it means, though, there are doubts among historians as to whether Reinfried actually came from Rüdesheim. The story about him taking part in a Crusade and after successfully coming back from the campaign endowing the monastery to fulfil a vow is at least a fine legend. Reinfried's only known issue was a son who himself had entered Saint Vincent's Abbey in Metz, before his father's donation, and became a monk. Offenbach belonged in the Middle Ages to the Hochgericht auf der Heide ("High Court on the Heath"), at which the Waldgraves exercised jurisdiction. From what it says in a 1318 Rechtsweistum (a Weistum – cognate with English wisdom – was a legal pronouncement issued by men learned in law in the Middle Ages and early modern times; this one dealt with the law itself), however, the Offenbach Monastery must have acquired its own powers and even its own jurisdiction. Then functioning as Lord of the Court was Wenz von Moilenstein (Mühlenstein), a Waldgravial vassal. From 16th-century Weistümer, however, it is clear that Offenbacher Recht ("Offenbach Law") became ever more limited over the centuries. In 1330, Emperor Ludwig IV ("Louis the Bavarian"; 1314–1347) granted the village town privilege on the model of Kaiserslautern town rights. This was, however, made conditional on the townsmen's forgoing any great fortification structures. In the course of the Waldgravial house's development, Offenbach belonged to the Amt of Grumbach in the 15th century. The Waldgraves (later Rhinegraves) who resided there saw themselves as Reinfried's descendants and thus tried to exercise market rights. The provost would have none of it, and fought them. The Vogtei over the monastery passed in 1479 to the Counts Palatine (Dukes) of Zweibrücken. In 1486, there was an agreement between the monastery and the Waldgraves under whose terms each side's rights were precisely set down. Under this arrangement, the provostry could claim most of its old ownership rights, while the inhabitants became fully subject to the Waldgravial house. The provost himself, according to the agreement, further had to comply with an old traditional duty, namely, delivering the gallows.

==== Hundheim ====
Hundheim may have arisen sometime in the 5th or 6th century. The village's original Celtic name, Glene, might be a clue to a pre-Christian settlement here, but it is likelier that the village was named after the river Glan, whose Celtic name was still in use. Already very early on, with interruptions, Hundheim was the administrative seat for the whole Eßweiler Tal (dale). Belonging to this territory were the villages of Hachenbach, Hinzweiler, Aschbach, Horschbach, Oberweiler, Elzweiler, Eßweiler and the now vanished villages of Letzweiler, Niederaschbach, Nörweiler, Mittelhofen, Zeizelbach, Füllhof, Neideck and Lanzweiler. According to the 870 record in which Hundheim had its first documentary mention, Emperor Ludwig der Deutsche (Louis the German; ~806 – 28 August 876) acknowledged the donation of some land in locis que vocantur Glena ("in places that are called Glena") to Prüm Abbey. The exact Mediaeval Latin text reads: In Nomine Sanctae et individuae trinitatis. Hludouuicus divina favente gratia rex. Notum sit omnibus sanctae dei ecclesiae fidelibus nostrisque praesentibus scilicet et futuris, qualiter quidam nobilis vir nomine Heririh tradidit quasdam res proprietatis suae ad monasterium Primiae, quod est constructum in honore sancti Salvatoris, coram istis fideiussoribus, quorum nomina sint: Megingaudus comes, Milo, item Megingaudus vicedominus, Brunicho, Hunaldus, Ratadus, id est in Locis, que vocantur glena, seu quod ipse… and the rest of the text deals with Windesheim and Bingen. In Prüm Abbey's directory of holdings, the Prümer Urbar, dating from 893, a great landhold of 46 Hufen (Hufen were roughly equivalent to oxgangs) in Glene is listed, which without a doubt is the same as the Hererich donation (note nobilis vir nomine Heririh – "noble man by the name Heririh" – in the above text). Various historians (Lamprecht, Geysseling, Christmann, Seibrich) tried to assign this complex to different places (Odenbach, Glan-Münchweiler, Altenglan, Hundheim), but even so, it would seem that Wolfgang Seibrich's suggestion that the Hererich donation, or the complex in the Prümer Urbar, should be assigned to Hundheim has the best chance. By all considerations, only Hundheim could be the same place as Hererich's Glena or Prüm's Glene. Glena/Glene became the seat of a Hun, a secular administrator or Untervogt for the whole area, which bit by bit was given over to 14 lords. The lords in question were the Junker Mühlenstein von Grumbach as the Rhinegraves’ vassal, the County Palatine of Zweibrücken, Offenbach Abbey, Remigiusberg Abbey, Tholey Abbey, Enkenbach Abbey, the Knights Hospitaller commandry at Sulzbach, the Church of Zweibrücken, the Church of Sankt Julian, the Church of Hinzweiler (formerly Hirsau), the Stangenjunker of Lauterecken, the House of Blick von Lichtenberg, the Lords of Mauchenheim and the Lords of Mickelheim. The Waldgraves and Rhinegraves were holders of high jurisdiction from the High Middle Ages onwards. They were represented by vassals, at first by the Lords of Mühlenstein, and later by the Lords Cratz von Scharfenstein, who for a time had their base at the Hirsauer Kirche, and also for a time at the Springeburg (or Sprengelburg; the ruin still stands today between Eßweiler and Oberweiler im Tal). The Counts of Veldenz, as feudal lords over the dale's "poor people" (as of 1444, this was instead the Counts Palatine of Zweibrücken) chose as their seat the village of Nerzweiler, which between 1350 and 1451 was always named in documents as the seat of the Nerzweiler Amt. It can thus be assumed not only that from the mid 12th century until about the middle of the 14th century, Hundheim was the Amt seat for the whole dale (and thus the Hun's seat), but also that the Hun's function thereafter and until the middle of the 15th century lay at Nerzweiler. Later still, records speak of the Hundheimer Pflege (literally "care", but actually a local geopolitical unit), and thus Hundheim also became an Amt seat in the Late Middle Ages. High jurisdiction lay as before with the Waldgraves and Rhinegraves, and likewise the dale's "poor people" remained subjects of the Counts of Veldenz and later the Counts Palatine (Dukes) of Zweibrücken. This transfer came about when in 1444, the County of Veldenz met its end when Count Friedrich III of Veldenz died without a male heir. His daughter Anna wed King Ruprecht's son Count Palatine Stephan. By uniting his own Palatine holdings with the now otherwise heirless County of Veldenz – his wife had inherited the county, but not her father's title – and by redeeming the hitherto pledged County of Zweibrücken, Stephan founded a new County Palatine, as whose comital residence he chose the town of Zweibrücken: the County Palatine – later Duchy – of Palatinate-Zweibrücken. Dependence on a great number of lords in the dale afforded greater freedom than in other areas where united power and governing relationships prevailed. Legal matters within the Eßweiler Tal were governed by a whole range of Weistümer (plural of Weistum), which were already in force in the Middle Ages, although they were not actually set down in writing until the early 16th century. These documents are still preserved, and are said today to be prime examples of mediaeval jurisprudence. One deals with the court and borders, one is a Kanzelweistum (promulgated at church; Kanzel is German for "pulpit"), one is a Huberweistum (Huber were farmers who worked a whole Hube, which roughly corresponds to an "oxgang"), and one was a municipal Weistum (Gemeindeweistum).

=== Modern times ===
==== Offenbach ====
From Weistümer handed down in 1515 and 1519, it can be seen that the inhabitants were fully subject to the Counts of Grumbach. The Counts Palatine (Dukes) of Zweibrücken had not forgone their protector rights over the provostry, however. Thus, the village in principle lay under two lordships, the abbey under Zweibrücken and the rest of the market village under the Waldgraves and Rhinegraves of Grumbach. It might well have been that the composition of Schöffen (roughly "lay jurists") could be traced back to the old Offenbacher Recht ("Offenbach Law"): seven had to be chosen by Offenbach and the other seven by Grumbach. The lords holding the land in Offenbach were now still the Lords of Mühlenstein, who would soon be replaced by the Lords Cratz von Scharfenstein. These lords were also the Rhinegraves’ lieutenants in the Eßweiler Tal. In 1656, when the Rhinegraves wanted to sell the provostry off from its mother monastery, Saint Vincent's Abbey in Metz, the deal fell through because of objections raised by the Zweibrücken lords protector. In 1609, the unused 1330 town privilege was renewed by Counts Johann der Jüngere ("the Younger") von Grumbach and Adolf von Rheingrafenstein. Thereafter, all townsmen and other inhabitants of the market village, together with the women and children, were forever freed of all serfdom. In the Thirty Years' War, Offenbach suffered greatly, and more details about what happened in this village are known than for most others. In the abbey stewardship's accounts, the steward wrote down some of the details, which have been published in various local history works. What follows are a few examples:

- 1628: "The abbey is ever more often claimed by travelling lordships and passing soldiers and horsemen."
- 1629: "All my wine has been guzzled up after House of Collalto horsemen billeted themselves at the monastery for eight days."
- 1630: "Yet more warriors came through, for this reason the state scrivener at Lichtenberg and Amt servant to me stopped by overnight to speak to the officers about good discipline."
- 1631: "At Hohenroth, the abbey has an hereditary estate. The people, however, have died, their children ruined, some moved to another place and the estate now lies unfarmed."
- 1633: "The abbey's three little ponds were ruined by the soldiers with quicksilver."
- 1635: "All horses have been taken away, both from the monasterial and the princely subjects, by Swedish and Imperial Soldateska (roughly "rampaging, out-of-control soldiers"). ... The abbey's serfs are mostly either dead or ruined."

All in all, it may be assumed that owing to wartime events and sickness, a great number of villagers died in the war. Reconstruction took a long time, and only gradually was the village settled again. Then came more woe with French King Louis XIV's wars of conquest. In the 18th century, though, the population once again rose to levels not seen since before these wars. In no way was it held to be a good circumstance throughout the centuries for the village of Offenbach to be under the Rhinegraves’ ownership and for the provostry, with all its holdings, including the church stewardship since the Reformation, to be under the protection of the Counts Palatine (Dukes) of Zweibrücken. Thus, in 1754, Christian IV, Count Palatine of Zweibrücken and Rhinegrave Karl Walrad Wilhelm forged an agreement to end this state of affairs. The County Palatine forsook their rights over the Offenbach church stewardship with all its holdings, among them the villages of Hundheim, Nerzweiler, Oberweiler, Hinzweiler and Aschbach, relinquishing them to the Rhinegraviate, against which it received from the Rhinegraviate its one-third share of Alsenz and the whole villages of Hochstetten, Winterborn and Niederhausen. This ownership arrangement lasted until feudalism itself was swept away with the coming of the French Revolution.

==== Hundheim ====
As early as 1537, the Counts Palatine (Dukes) of Zweibrücken introduced the Reformation, which also made itself felt in the Eßweiler Tal. In the course of the 16th century, the Plague raged and the villages were depopulated. In Hundheim itself in 1575, only 16 people were left. With respect to lordly relations, in 1595 there was a change: the high jurisdiction, which for some 250 years had been held by the Waldgraves and Rhinegraves, was transferred to the Counts Palatine of Zweibrücken. In return, Count Palatine Johannes I of Zweibrücken transferred the village of Kirchenbollenbach near Idar-Oberstein (nowadays a Stadtteil of that town) to the Rhinegraves. Lordship over the blood court thereby ended up in new hands, while the other lords of the 14 named above still otherwise held their tithing rights in the various villages. In 1614, Duke Johannes II of Zweibrücken traded his serfs in Teschenmoschel for some in the Eßweiler Tal belonging to Baron Johann Gottfried von Sickingen in Schallodenbach. Hundheim, too, suffered in the Thirty Years' War, although details are not available. Another fundamental shift in the power structure came in 1755, when Duke Christian IV transferred Offenbach Abbey with the villages of Hundheim, Nerzweiler, Hinzweiler, Oberweiler, Oberaschbach and Niederaschbach (now vanished) and also the Hirsauer Kirche to the Rhinegraves of Grumbach, who until 1595 had exercised high jurisdiction in these villages. Hundheim thereafter remained in the Rhinegraviate until the collapse of the old feudal order in the course of the French Revolution.

==== Recent times ====
During the time of the French Revolution and the Napoleonic era that followed, the German lands on the Rhine's left bank were annexed by France. The French thereby swept away all borders that had hitherto existed and established their own administrative entities. Roughly, the Glan formed the boundary between the Departments of Sarre and Mont-Tonnerre (or Donnersberg in German). Offenbach and Hundheim, still many years away from their eventual merger, found themselves in two different departments.

===== Offenbach =====
Offenbach, as a village lying mainly on the Glan's left bank, now became the seat of a mairie ("mayoralty") within the Department of Sarre, the Arrondissement of Birkenfeld and the Canton of Grumbach. Also belonging to the Mairie of Offenbach were the villages of Wiesweiler, Buborn, Deimberg, Niedereisenbach (Ortsteil of Glanbrücken), Sankt Julian, Eschenau and Niederalben. After the victory over Napoleon in 1814, the Congress of Vienna imposed a new set of borders upon the region, and after a transitional period, Offenbach passed in 1816 to the Principality of Lichtenberg, a newly created exclave of the Duchy of Saxe-Coburg-Saalfeld, which as of 1826 became the Duchy of Saxe-Coburg and Gotha. As part of this state, it passed in 1834 to the Kingdom of Prussia, which made this area into the Sankt Wendel district. The mairie was dissolved and Offenbach belonged to the Amt of Grumbach. Later, after the First World War, the Treaty of Versailles stipulated, among other things, that 26 of the Sankt Wendel district's 94 municipalities had to be ceded to the British- and French-occupied Saar. The remaining 68 municipalities then bore the designation "Restkreis St. Wendel-Baumholder", with the first syllable of Restkreis having the same meaning as in English, in the sense of "left over". Offenbach belonged to this district until 1937, when it was transferred to the Birkenfeld district, which had until then been part of Oldenburg. Since 1946, it has been part of the then newly founded state of Rhineland-Palatinate.

===== Hundheim =====
Hundheim, once a Rhinegravial Amt seat now also became the hub of a mairie to which also belonged the villages of Nerzweiler, Aschbach, Hinzweiler, Hachenbach (Ortsteil of Glanbrücken) and Gumbsweiler (Ortsteil of Sankt Julian). After French rule, the Congress of Vienna drew new boundaries yet again. After a transitional time, Hundheim was grouped into the bayerischer Rheinkreis, later known as Rheinpfalz ("Rhenish Palatinate"), an exclave of the Kingdom of Bavaria in 1816, where it became the seat of a new Bürgermeisterei ("mayoralty") to which also belonged the villages of Nerzweiler, Aschbach, Hinzweiler and Hachenbach, within the Landcommissariat (later Bezirksamt, then Landkreis or district) of Kusel and the Canton of Lauterecken. Between 1880 and 1892, however, Nerzweiler was the mayoral seat. In the late 1920s and early 1930s, the Nazi Party (NSDAP) became quite popular in Hundheim. In the 1928 Reichstag elections, 6.3% of the local votes went to Adolf Hitler's party, but by the 1930 Reichstag elections, this had grown to 47.3% (26.0% in Offenbach). By the time of the 1933 Reichstag elections, after Hitler had already seized power, local support for the Nazis had swollen to 64.0%. Hitler's success in these elections paved the way for his Enabling Act of 1933 (Ermächtigungsgesetz), thus starting the Third Reich in earnest.

==== Offenbach-Hundheim ====
In the course of the 1968 administrative restructuring in Rhineland-Palatinate, Offenbach was transferred once again in 1969, this time to the Kusel district, in which it remains today. The Bürgermeisterei ("Mayoralty") of Hundheim was dissolved, and the hitherto separate villages of Offenbach and Hundheim were amalgamated into one municipality, Offenbach-Hundheim, which came into being on 7 June 1969. In 1972, the Verbandsgemeinde of Lauterecken was established, into which were grouped most of the villages of the old Amt of Grumbach, along with Offenbach-Hundheim.

=== Population development ===
==== Offenbach ====
The village of Offenbach earned special prestige as early as the High Middle Ages for the founding of the provostry. The provostry itself held the right to hold markets, and these early on earned regional importance. Furthermore, during the High and Late Middle Ages, there was a lively pilgrimage, which led to the villagers’ occupations being characterized by trade. There were, however, also farmers as in all villages, though here in Offenbach, agriculture experienced particularly good development from its many vineyards. As already mentioned, the population sustained severe losses in the Thirty Years' War and French King Louis XIV's wars of conquest. Given the rather great share of the population that is Catholic, it can be assumed that newcomers from France came to settle in Offenbach as a direct result of French policy at that time. The population further rose greatly because of the high number of children, and in the course of the 18th century, there was even considerable emigration, which continued into the 19th century. Later, in both world wars, came population losses: 31 in the First World War; 58 in the Second World War. Apart from the light population losses before and after the First World War, and despite emigration in the 19th and 20th centuries, a steady rise in population figures may be noted. Although many inhabitants are employed locally, the overwhelming majority of those dependent on employment must commute elsewhere. Thus, Offenbach mostly has the character of a rural residential community, albeit one with a striving tourism industry.

The following table shows population development since Napoleonic times for Offenbach, with some figures broken down by religious denomination:

Year	1815	1860	1900	1905	1925	1928	1929	1930	1931	1958	1988*	2007*
Total	466	749	833	751	819	793	815	825	805	1,007	1,419	1,243
Catholic						116	130	125	133
Evangelical						646	655	669	643
Jewish						31	30	29	29

*Figures for the whole Ortsgemeinde of Offenbach-Hundheim after amalgamation.

==== Hundheim ====
The following table shows population development over the centuries for Hundheim:

Year	1515	1775	1802	1827	1835	1850	1875	1885	1900	1910	1939	1962
Total	17*	90	172	275	381	362	405	420	413	467	477	439

*Denotes number of families.

=== Municipality's names ===
==== Offenbach ====
According to researchers Dolch and Greule, the prefix Offen— goes back to a personal name, Offo or Uffo. The name would therefore suggest that the village was originally one founded on Offo's (or Uffo's) brook (the ending —bach means "brook"). It apparently has nothing to do with the Modern High German word offen, meaning "open". The village's name had its first documentary mention in an 1150 document in its current spelling. The like-sounding mention from 1135 is a forgery from the 13th century. Other forms of the name that appeared in the Middle Ages are Ophimbach (1215), Ovphenbach (1255), Uffinbach (1259) and Offembach (1343).

==== Hundheim ====
Toponym researchers assume that today's Ortsteil of Hundheim in the municipality of Offenbach-Hundheim was originally called Glana or Glene, and perhaps also Neuenglan, a name that would have distinguished it from Altenglan (alt and neu are German for "old" and "new" respectively). Whatever its true original name was, the village was described in an 870 document – as repeated in a 10th-century copy – as Glena. The name Glene then appeared in a now lost 893 book of feudal holdings from Prüm, of which a 1222 transcription is preserved. Once arising over this Glene in Prüm Abbey's directory of holdings, the Prümer Urbar, was a scientific debate, which has only now been settled. Among others, Ernst Christmann applied this Glene to Altenglan. Alfred Wendel wanted to recognize a link with Medard. Neither position, however, stands up to scrutiny, for Altenglan was then held by the Bishopric of Reims or the Abbey of Saint-Remi, also in Reims, and Medard was then held by the Bishopric of Verdun. A name change came about in the 12th century insofar as Glene-Hundheim became the seat of an Untervogt, known in the speech of the time as a Hun. Accordingly, the name Huntheim appears in Reinfried's 1150 document, whereas in a 1310 document, the village is still called Glana. It would seem from this that the name change took place only gradually. Other forms of the name that appeared over time are Huntheym (1363), Hontheim (1436), Hundtheim (1480) and Hontum (1515). The original name Glene therefore relates to the Celtic name Glan, still used for the local river today, while the later name Hundheim, still used now, is interpreted as the seat of the Hun.

=== Vanished villages ===
Part of Offenbach-Hundheim's municipal area belonged in the Middle Ages to the now vanished village of Niederaschbach. This village lay in the valley of the Aschbach, which empties into the Glan between Offenbach and Wiesweiler. The prefix Nieder— is cognate with and means the same as the English "nether", and served to distinguish the village from Aschbach farther upstream. Between Hundheim and Nerzweiler, on the Talbach's right bank, once lay a small village named Letzweiler, which was never mentioned again in documents after the Thirty Years' War. Popularly recognized is a former village named Hirsau (not to be confused with Hirsau in Baden-Württemberg) that sprang up around the Hirsauer Kirche, an old country church, now no longer used, that still stands near Hundheim. It is unlikely that Hirsau was ever a proper village, even though it was an ecclesiastical and secular hub for the whole dale. What is far likelier is that it was a mere hamlet with a manor house, a rectory, buildings for personnel and commercial buildings near the church itself. After its first mention in Reinfried's 1150 document as Hornesowe, it was also mentioned in 1196 as Hurnishowen and in 1289 as Hurresouwe. The name supposedly does not go back to a Hirschau ("hart's riverside flat"), but rather to a man with the early Frankish name Hurni, and thus it originally would have meant "Hurni's Riverside Flat". The name Hurni, however, is unattested.

== Religion ==
=== Offenbach ===
Just when a church was first built in Offenbach is unknown. What is known with certainty is that before the church, whose remnants are still preserved today, was built, another stood on the same spot, a Romanesque church whose foundations were discovered during renovation work in 1963. According to the 1150 donation document, there was supposedly even a cella (monastic cell) on the estate that Reinfried had endowed. Although the monastery had been donated to the abbey in Metz, in terms of ecclesiastical organization it was subject to the Archbishopric of Mainz. The church was consecrated to the Virgin Mary. It first arose about the year 1225 (Romanesque quire and apses) and had other parts added at various widely spaced times. Because its building history is rather long, it clearly bears stylistic features from the transitional time between Romanesque architecture and Gothic architecture. The transept, with the south semitransept based on the French model and the north matching the domestic development in Germany, was completed about 1250. The nave, akin in execution to the monastery church in Otterberg, was finished about 1300. The last part added was the eight-sided crossing tower, which in conception is akin to that at Limburg Cathedral. The convent was, after dogged opposition from the provost, dissolved in the course of the Reformation. The monasterial estate passed into the ownership of the Counts Palatine (Dukes) of Zweibrücken, who had it administered through a stewardship. The local church community was henceforth and until 1800 tended together with the Lutheran one in Sankt Julian. After Catholic Christians had settled in the village beginning in the late 17th century, the big church became a simultaneous church. However, a newer publication (Hein 2000) states that there was a Stadtkirche ("Town Church") next to the monastery church in the 18th century, about which investigations were to be undertaken. Bit by bit, the provostry church fell into disrepair, and the unused nave was even used from the time of the French Revolution as a quarry. Eventually only the crossing with the crossing tower and the quire with the apses were left standing, and even those were threatening to fall down. As to the question of whether the rest of the building should be torn down or renovated, it was decided in 1894 that the latter was preferable. A special service in this endeavour can be ascribed to the then Evangelical pastor and later superintendent Karl Georg Merz. Further extensive restoration work followed from 1962 to 1970 under Pastor Erich Renk's oversight. As early as 1884, north of the provostry church, Saint Peter's and Saint Paul's Catholic Parish Church was built, and thus the Evangelical parish could once again take over the provostry church as its own parish church. The post-Reformation Catholic parish in Offenbach was founded in 1684 as a branch of Lauterecken. To this day, most of the parishioners live in Offenbach itself, and only a few in neighbouring villages. Before the Second World War, some 15% of the whole population adhered to the Catholic faith. There are good relations between the two Christian denominations, and there are quite often ecumenical events. The Evangelical parish, formerly a branch of Sankt Julian, acquired in 1800 the status of self-administering parish. Belonging to it in the nearby area were a few branch communities. After 1815, a new order arose as a result of the territorial changes wrought by the post-Napoleonic Congress of Vienna. Offenbach, Niedereisenbach (Ortsteil of Glanbrücken) and Wiesweiler then together formed a parish. Since 1950, the Evangelical Stewardship of the Church District of Sankt Wendel, which oversees the parish's finances, has existed in Offenbach. For centuries before they were driven out or murdered by the National Socialist régime, there were many Jews living in Offenbach. Records show that they were in the village as early as the 16th century. Of the not much more than 400 inhabitants in 1800, some 100 clung to the Jewish faith. Most of the Jews in Offenbach were businessmen who held a great share in the upswing in economic life. The numerical relationship between Jews and Christians in the village had changed even before Nazi times. In 1938, there were 33 Jews in eight families living in Offenbach. There were a synagogue, built in 1832, and a Jewish school in the village, near today's marketplace. The municipality of Offenbach bought the synagogue in 1936, after it had not been used as such for quite some time, thus saving it from being burnt down on Kristallnacht (9–10 November 1938). Nonetheless, this building, which was also significant to building history, was torn down in 1955. Now standing on the same spot is the parish hall.

=== Hundheim ===
The old Hirsauer Kirche was originally the spiritual hub for all villages in the Eßweiler Tal. When it was that a church was first built in Hirsau (not to be confused with Hirsau in Baden-Württemberg) cannot be determined today. It can be assumed nonetheless that there had been an earlier church standing at the same spot centuries before the one that still stands now was built (1106); it may have been wooden. Churchgoers came from throughout the dale to attend services, all weddings were held there, and so were all funerals and burials. It was also the thingstead, and on certain days, market was held there, too. The fact that the Eßweiler Tal was held by Prüm Abbey in the Early and High Middle Ages might hardly have had any effect on village life. Originally, the church was built as a small Romanesque village church, but about 1250 it underwent major conversions in the Gothic style. In the quire paintings that are now famous were done, depicting scenes from the Bible, the Acts of the Apostles and Marian legends. These were plastered over in the Late Middle Ages with chalky plaster and brought to light again only after the Second World War. They were laid bare and restored in 1962. Extensive conversion work was undertaken time and again over the centuries, with the last few times being 1929, 1961 and 1990. Hirsau lost its central role when in 1451 the church in Hinzweiler was built, although originally this only functioned as a chapel of ease to Hirsau's parish church. This actually brought about competition between the two churches in the time that followed for the function of parish church. As early as 1526, the Duchy of Palatinate-Zweibrücken introduced the Reformation into the church of the Oberamt of Meisenheim, replacing Catholic belief with Martin Luther's teachings so that bit by bit, church services in the Eßweiler Tal, too, began to be conducted in accordance with the Reformation. The Offenbach Monastery, to which the Hinzweiler church was subject, at first opposed Reformist efforts. In 1555, though, the Rhinegraves of Grumbach, too, introduced the Reformation, and in 1588, the Offenbach Monastery was dissolved. After the Counts Palatine of Zweibrücken had become absolute fiefholders over the Eßweiler Tal in 1795, worshippers then had to convert to Calvinism in line with developments in the County Palatine. These measures were not as consequently carried out for Hundheim as in other parts of the County Palatine of Zweibrücken. Beginning in 1601, Hinzweiler became the temporary parish seat, but already by 1610, it once again had to yield this function to Hirsau, only to get it back after the Thirty Years' War, after the Hirsauer Kirche had been badly damaged. This structure remains in place to this day. All pastors of the Hirsauer Kirche are known by name. By religious affiliation, not all Hundheim's inhabitants had converted from Lutheranism to Calvinism by the late 16th century, and even in the time that followed, Lutherans could claim to be somewhat stronger in numbers than the Calvinists. The two denominations united anyway in 1818, in the Protestant Union. Beginning in the late 17th century, there were a few Catholics in the village. In the early 19th century, Jews settled sporadically.

== Politics ==
=== Municipal council ===
The council is made up of 16 council members, who were elected by proportional representation at the municipal election held on 7 June 2009, and the honorary mayor as chairwoman.

The municipal election held on 7 June 2009 yielded the following results:

Year	SPD	WG1	WG2	Total
2009	–	7	9	16 seats
2004	4	12	–	16 seats

WG1 and WG2 are voters’ groups.

=== Mayor ===
Offenbach-Hundheim's mayor is Peter Stein.

=== Coat of arms ===
The German blazon reads: In Blau ein silberner Schrägwellenbalken, begleitet oben von einem sechsstrahligen Stern, unten von einer goldenen Rose.

The municipality's arms might in English heraldic language be described thus: Azure a bend wavy argent between a rose foiled of six and a mullet Or.

The now merged municipality's coat of arms is actually the one formerly borne by Offenbach alone before the amalgamation. Hundheim then bore no arms. The bend (slanted stripe) and the two other charges, the rose and the mullet (six-pointed star shape), were the elements that already appeared on an Offenbach court seal in the 16th century. This seal served as the model for the creation of the arms in 1934, when the municipality was granted permission to choose whatever tinctures it deemed fit. The arms were approved by the Prussian Ministry of the Interior. However, approval needed to be granted again for the merged municipality of Offenbach-Hundheim to bear the arms, and they were approved in 1976 by the now defunct Rheinhessen-Pfalz Regierungsbezirk administration in Neustadt an der Weinstraße.

== Culture and sightseeing ==
=== Buildings ===
The following are listed buildings or sites in Rhineland-Palatinate's Directory of Cultural Monuments:

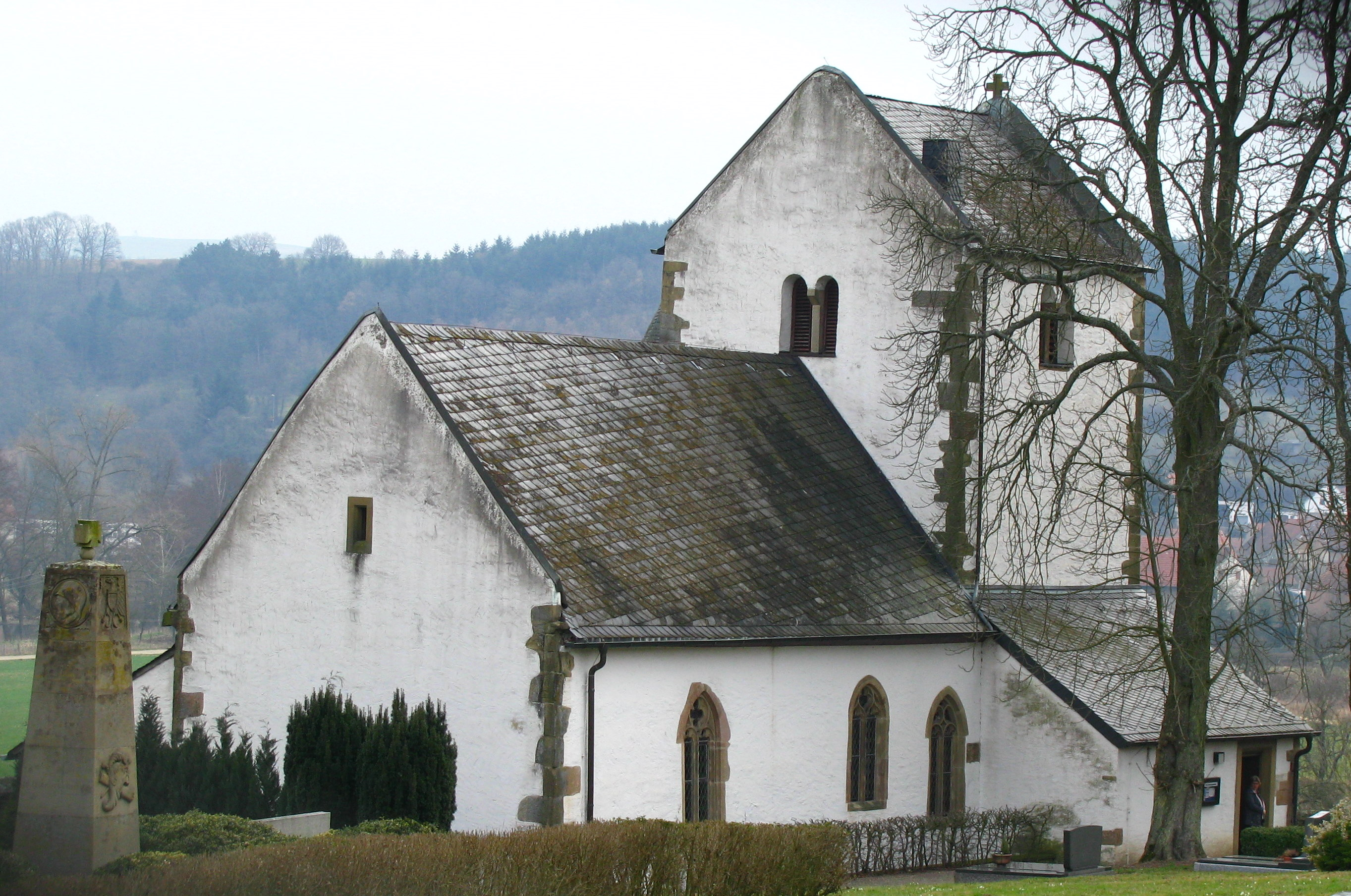
Hundheim, Hirsauer Straße 30: Evangelical parish church (Hirsauer Kirche)

==== Hundheim ====
- Hirsauer Straße 9 – former school; Baroque Revival building with half-hipped roof, 1907, architect Regional Master Builder Kleinhans
- Hirsauer Straße 15 – three-sided estate, 1926; building with half-hipped roof, side building
- Evangelical parish church, Hirsauer Straße 30 – so-called Hirsauer Kirche, rectangular aisleless church, essentially from the early 12th century, conversion 1507, side nave and staircase 1894; quire tower 1197/1269, belfry renewed in 1692; wall paintings, latter half of the 13th century; bell, 1480 by Johannes Otto, Kaiserslautern, second bell about 1500; Roman spolia; graveyard wall, possibly from the 15th century; west of the church: warriors’ memorial 1914–1918, 1927

==== Offenbach am Glan ====
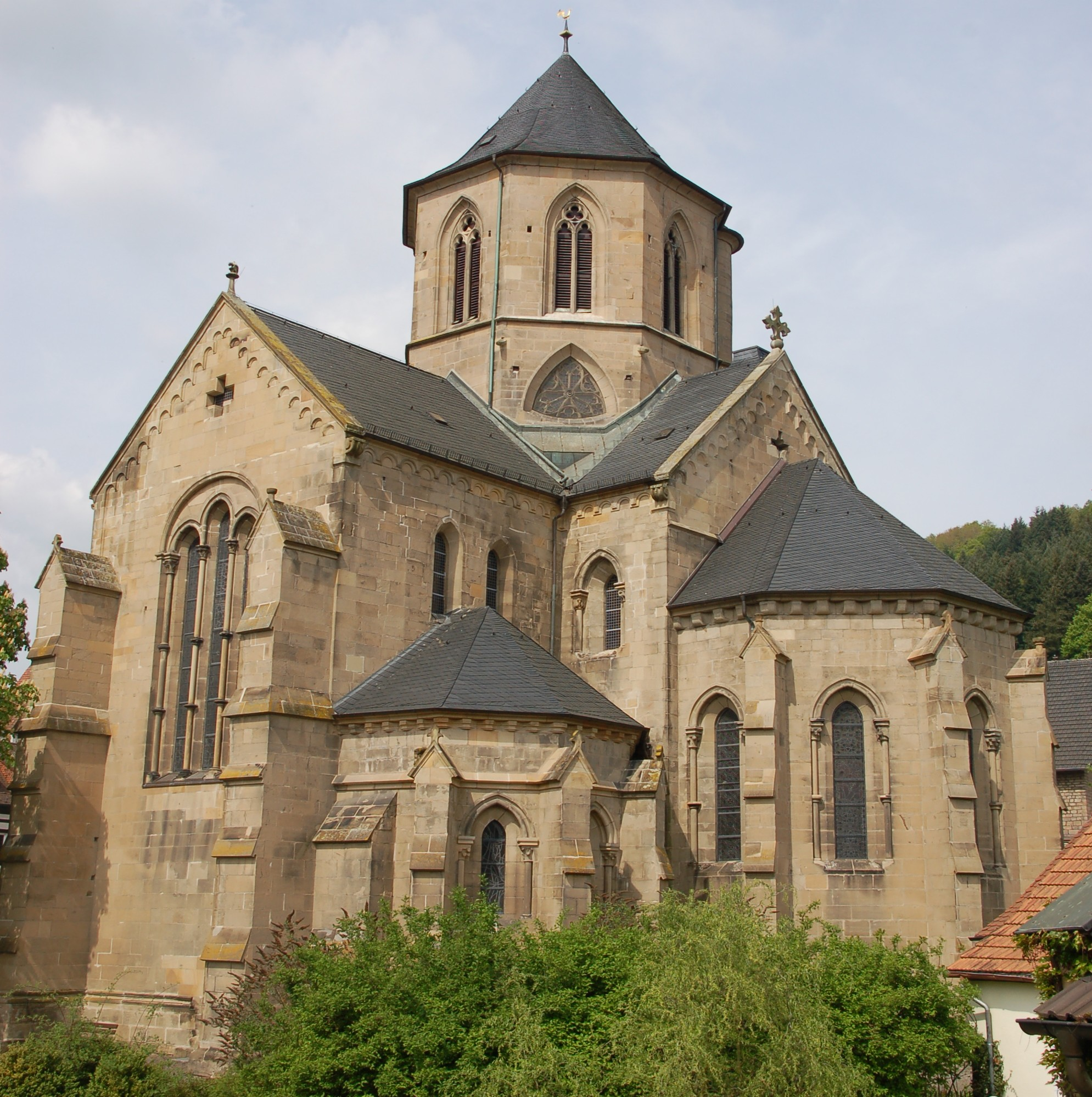
Offenbach, Klosterstraße 12: Evangelical parish church

- Evangelical parish church, Klosterstraße 12 – church of the former Benedictine provostry of Saint Mary, Late Romanesque/Early Gothic sandstone-block building on cross-shaped footprint, triple nave, crossing tower, three polygonal apses, begun about 1225, transept possibly soon after 1250, nave about 1300, 1808–1810 all but south aisle torn down, east bay and one middle nave bay 1892–1894, architects District Building Inspector Koch and Government Master Builder Bennstein; characterizes village's appearance; in the lapidarium remnants of the former building, possibly about 1150
- Saint Peter's and Saint Paul's Catholic Parish Church (Pfarrkirche St. Peter und Paul), Bergstraße 4 – Gothic Revival block aisleless church with west tower, 1884, architect Joseph Hoffmann, Ludwigshafen, revised by Cathedral Master Builder Schmidt, Vienna; characterizes village's appearance; Klais organ from 1910
- Brückenstraße 3 – former monastery mill; U-shaped mill complex grouped around a yard with dwelling, commercial and stable rooms, essentially from the 15th century, conversions about 1700 and in the 19th century, oilmill building 1605, conversion 1816; Renaissance portal, marked 1573; whole complex of buildings
- Hauptstraße 62/73 – former pranger building; corner building, timber-frame upper floor with corner oriel, renovated in the 18th century, gateway arch marked 1754
- Höhweg, New Jewish Graveyard (Neuer jüdischer Friedhof) (monumental zone) – enclosed area, laid out in 1887; 41 gravestones from 1887 to 1937
- Klosterstraße 13 – former Catholic rectory; stone-block building, 1872; whole complex of buildings with Catholic schoolhouse and Catholic church
- Klosterstraße 14 – former Catholic school; plastered building, 1855, extra floor 1905/1906; whole complex of buildings with Catholic rectory and Catholic church
- Klosterstraße 16 – former monastery guardhouse; timber-frame building, partly solid, wooden loggia, marked 1560
- Old Jewish Graveyard (Alter jüdischer Friedhof), Oberster Frimschenberg (monumental zone) – some 100 gravestones along with broken bits and pedestal fragments, from about 1739 to about 1890

The three-naved Evangelical church in Offenbach is said to be the most important ecclesiastical building monument in the Western Palatinate. Building work on the former Benedictine Saint Mary's Monastery Church was begun in the 13th century and finished in the 15th century. In 1894 it was thoroughly renovated.

Near Hundheim stands the Hirsauer Kapelle (chapel) or Hirsauer Kirche, a one-naved building with a square tower built in the 12th century. Later built onto this originally Romanesque building were Gothic additions. It was formerly the parish church for the villages in the Eßweiler Tal.

=== Regular events ===
The kermis (church consecration festival) and the market are held on the second weekend in May. A great winemakers’ festival of regional importance in September still recalls the time when winegrowing was extensively undertaken in Offenbach. A Christmas Market is held on the second Saturday in December.

=== Clubs ===
Offenbach-Hundheim has the following clubs:

- Angelsportverein — angling club
- DRK — German Red Cross local chapter
- Evangelischer Posaunenchor und Kirchenchor — Evangelical trombone choir and church choir
- Flötengruppe — flute group
- Förderverein der Feuerwehr — fire brigade promotional association
- Förderverein des Kindergartens — kindergarten promotional association
- Gemischter Chor Hundheim — mixed choir
- Höllen-Teufel — "Hell-Devils" (1. FC Kaiserslautern fan club)
- Judoclub — judo club
- Katholischer Kirchenchor — Catholic church choir
- Landfrauenverein — countrywomen's club
- Männergesangverein — men's singing club
- MC Glantal Riders — motorcycle club
- Pfälzerwaldverein — hiking club
- SPD-Ortsverein — Social Democratic Party of Germany local chapter
- Tennisclub — tennis club
- Theaterverein — theatre club
- Turnverein — gymnastic club
- VdK — social advocacy group
- Verein für Rasenspiele — club for sports played on grass
- Vereinsgemeinschaft — association of clubs
- Verkehrsverein — transport club
- Vogelschutzverein — bird conservation club
- Waldbauverein — forestry club

== Economy and infrastructure ==
=== Economic structure ===
==== Offenbach ====
Besides agriculture and winegrowing, business was from days of yore of great importance. Without doubt, the oldest industrial operation was the monastery mill (Klostermühle), which after the monastery's dissolution the Counts Palatine (Dukes) of Zweibrücken put into Erbbestand (a uniquely German landhold arrangement in which ownership rights and usage rights were separated; this is forbidden by law in modern Germany). In the early 20th century, the millstones were replaced with an electric generator, and the municipality took over the mill and began, for a short time, to produce electricity. In 1907, the operation passed back into private ownership, and as of about 1920 produced only electricity, and that only for RWE beginning in 1928. Beginning about 1993, on private initiatives, the buildings have been being renovated from the ground up. There were no other early production businesses in Offenbach. In more recent times, however, an electric appliance factory has appeared on the Glan's right bank. Moreover, there are many retail shops, and Offenbach is said to be a small shopping centre. Tourism is developing in an agreeable way, and there are well-kept inns and pensions.

==== Hundheim ====
The inhabitants of Hundheim were even in the time after the Second World War mostly farmers. According to a livestock head count in 1928, there were 21 horses, 373 head of cattle, 29 sheep, 148 pigs, 66 goats, 1,229 chickens and 23 beekeepers. According to Weber, a gristmill stood on the Talbach in the mid 18th century and was, according to a 1744 letter of Erbbestand (see section above) expanded into an oilmill as well. Also standing on the Talbach was a small tannery. Among handicrafts that were worked in the 18th century alongside farming were those performed by one shoemaker, two tailors and two linen weavers. The first two crafts were still on hand even after the Second World War. They have, however, since disappeared. As early as the 18th century, collieries were being worked somewhat successfully on the slopes either side of the Talbach, as were also pits within Niederaschbach's former limits, land that for a while had belonged to Offenbach before being ceded to Hundheim. At times during the 19th century, 12 miners were working the pits. All in all, Hundheim is today held to be a rural residential community with future opportunities in the field of tourism.

=== Education ===
==== Offenbach ====
Schooling experienced a general upswing beginning in the time of the Reformation, but was forsaken during the Thirty Years' War. There are reports of the beginnings of school in Offenbach from as long ago as the 16th century, according to which the children had to go to a schoolmaster named Johannes Matthias Faber for Lutheran Kinderlehre ("child teaching"). In 1692, schoolteacher Pauly Schmidt was teaching. Throughout the 18th century there was a winter school (a school geared towards an agricultural community's practical needs, held in the winter, when farm families had a bit more time to spare). Disagreements between teachers and the municipality over teacher salaries never seemed to end. Teaching was done at a private house with very small windows, and the winter school teacher had at his disposal a very small dwelling on Klosterstraße. In the 19th century, Offenbach had three schools, one Evangelical, one Catholic and one Jewish. Before the Catholic school was founded in the early 19th century, Catholic schoolchildren had to attend school in Hundheim beginning in 1720, and as of 1750, in Niedereisenbach. Only in 1855 did the municipality have a Catholic schoolhouse built in which schoolchildren from the neighbouring villages could also be taught. The building was expanded in 1905. Today, the building houses flats. From 1937 until the end of the Second World War, there were no denominational schools. In 1945, Christliche Konfessionsschule ("Christian denominational school") was introduced. Between 1952 and 1954, there were even two classes at the Catholic school. The Jewish schoolhouse arose beside the synagogue as early as 1832, but there was only Jewish schooling there at times when a Jewish schoolteacher could be hired. Whenever none was to be had, Jewish schoolchildren had to attend the Evangelical school. As of 1808, year-round school began at the Evangelical school with schoolteacher Andreas Dessauer from Saxony, who was musically very gifted. In 1834, the municipality had a new schoolhouse built with a better dwelling for the schoolteacher. This building later housed the financial office and the Evangelical parish hall, being replaced by the new Evangelical parish hall built between 1981 and 1984. Schoolteacher Dessauer died in 1834, and his job was taken over by his then eighteen-year-old son, Karl Andreas. Until the introduction of a second teaching post in 1875, the younger Mr. Dessauer at times had to teach a class of up to 120 children. Following him was the third generation, Karl Adolf Dessauer. In 1902, a new Evangelical schoolhouse was built with three classrooms and two teachers’ dwellings. Nevertheless, a third class was only ever held in the 1937/1938 and 1966/1967 school years. Extensive expansion work was done in 1957 and 1958. The Evangelical school was also now being used to teach vocational school classes, and at the same time, a kindergarten was established. In the course of efforts to establish central schools after 1960, plans arose to build a Verbandsschule Offenbach as a Christian community school for Catholic and Evangelical schoolchildren from Offenbach and the surrounding villages, which then still belonged to the Birkenfeld district, and thus also to the Regierungsbezirk of Koblenz. The new schoolhouse was dedicated in 1967 and accordingly, the plan was put into force. Later, however, there came administrative restructuring in Rhineland-Palatinate, in the course of which, the two hitherto self-administering municipalities of Offenbach and Hundheim were amalgamated into one municipality, called Offenbach-Hundheim. Arising shortly thereafter was the Hauptschule Offenbach-St. Julian, with Hauptschule classes being held in both those villages, and likewise in 1974 came the Hauptschule Offenbach-Lauterecken, once more with Hauptschule classes being held in both places. After a new, big Hauptschule building had been built in Lauterecken in 1995, the new school in Offenbach was given up as a school and sold. Ever since, all Hauptschule students from the Verbandsgemeinde of Lauterecken have been attending the Hauptschule in the Verbandsgemeinde seat. Primary school pupils are taught in Sankt Julian. The new schoolhouse in Offenbach has served since then as a medical centre.

==== Hundheim ====
While schools arose in many villages in the 16th century, there is no record from this time showing that any such thing happened in Hundheim. The Duchy of Palatinate-Zweibrücken as a general rule promoted Reformed schools during the 17th century. Since Calvinism had never been introduced into the Eßweiler Tal, schools, too, remained bound to the Lutheran Church. In the 18th century, all denominations were once again allowed, and hence, there were once more schools of various denominations. In 1754 it was reported that the Lutheran school in Hundheim had no school building. This clearly implies, though, that there was at least Lutheran schooling in Hundheim. Then, in 1757, a report claimed that in the course of the 1755 exchanges, the school was moved to Bosenbach. School documents from the Speyer State Archive from the 19th century (H 38 1236) show that in 1849, Peter Scherer from Nußbach was in charge of education as school administrator. After him came Abraham Ruth from Blaubach, and in 1855, Wilhelm Frick from Duchroth (not to be confused with the like-named Nazi) was hired, who had for six years been the schoolteacher in Obereisenbach. In 1868, he complained that the teacher's extra duties at funerals, weddings and christenings were not being honoured in his yearly salary of 249 Rhenish guilders. Frick's first wife, Margarethe (née Ginkel) had died in Obereisenbach, and he was now seeking leave to marry Philippine Braun from Becherbach. In 1886, Frick had 68 pupils to teach. At an inspection he was criticized for not having the classroom display pictures of the squirrel and the raven on hand. Karl Mann was hired in 1878 and served for a long time. He got into trouble with the ecclesiastical school superintendence over his engagement to his fiancée, which the superintendence deemed to have lasted too long. Nonetheless, he wed Henriette Volles in 1880. This teacher was said to be quite argumentative, and indeed had to answer for, among other things, mishandling a policeman's son. Further problems came to him when his own son led a liberal gathering in 1912. By 1910, however, Mann was sick. He was promoted in 1922 to Oberlehrer (roughly "senior schoolteacher"), and retired the following year. In 1824 came Albert Koch, who had been born in Hundheim itself. Today, primary school pupils and Hauptschule students attend their respective schools in Lauterecken.

==== Offenbach-Hundheim ====
A nearby Gymnasium in Lauterecken can also be attended by students from Offenbach. Further opportunities are available in Kusel and Meisenheim. The nearest university town is Kaiserslautern (Kaiserslautern University of Technology).

=== Transport ===
Running through the village's two centres is Bundesstraße 420 (Oppenheim–Neunkirchen). Branching off to the south, in the more southerly centre of Hundheim, is Landesstraße 273 (Rothselberg–Offenbach-Hundheim), linking both centres with the Lauter valley and running onwards to the uplands to Altenglan, while Hundheim also serves as a gateway to the villages in the Glan valley. Another road, Kreisstraße 63, leads to the villages over the heights on the Glan's left bank. The nearest Autobahn interchanges are the ones at Kusel (20 km from either centre) and Kaiserslautern (35 km from Offenbach; 30 km from Hundheim). Beginning in 1906, Offenbach lay on the Glan Valley Railway (Glantalbahn) running from Bad Münster am Stein to Homburg, but this was shut down in stages about 1985. On the stretch of the line running through Odenbach, visitors may nowadays ride draisines. Serving Lauterecken (5 km from either centre) is a railway station on the Lauter Valley Railway (Lautertalbahn), while another on the Landstuhl–Kusel line serves Altenglan (12 km from Offenbach; 10 km from Hundheim).

== Famous people ==
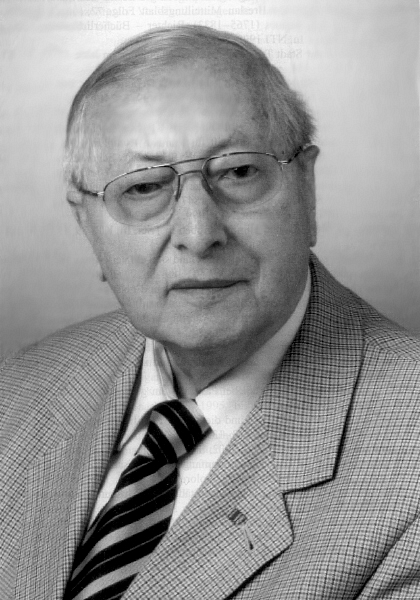
Guido Groß

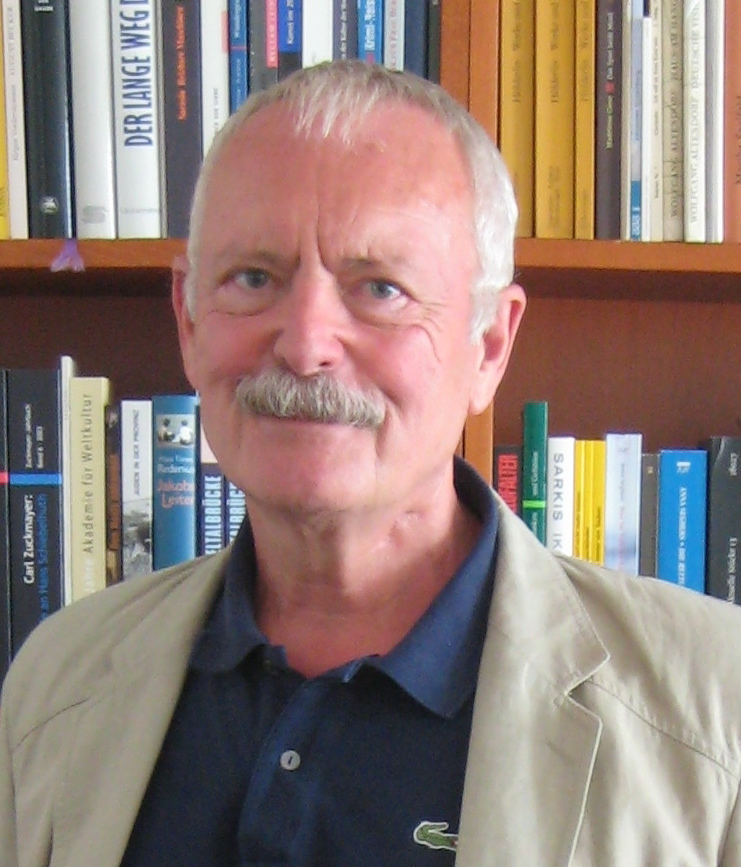
Sigfrid Gauch

=== Sons and daughters of the town ===
- Guido Groß (b. 17 February 1925; d. 25 January 2010)

A teacher and local historian, Guido Groß was awarded a Dr. phil. in 1954 by the University of Mainz. He taught as a schoolteacher until 1980. In 1974 he began working at the University of Trier as an appointee of the Rhineland-Palatinate state examination office for teaching posts at Realschulen and Gymnasien. In the 1980s and 1990s, Groß undertook extensive travels, mostly in Oriental lands. From 1959 to 1976, he had a secondary occupation at the Schroedel publishing house writing scholastic works. He was awarded the Dr.-Erich-Pies-Preis in 2001 and the Merit Cross on Ribbon on 13 May 1985. Groß's last few years were spent in illness after a stroke left him unable to speak or write. A selection of his works is listed at the German-language Wikipedia article about him.

- Erich Renner (1936–)

A professor of educational sciences at the Paedagogical College in Erfurt, Renner also published, besides scientific papers, works of fiction.

- Sigfrid Gauch (b. 9 March 1945)

A writer, educator and specialist in German studies, Gauch was awarded a doctorate in 1985. From 1991 he was department head at the Rhineland-Palatinate Ministry for Training and Culture. His publications are, among others, Vaterspuren (1979), Friedrich Joseph Emerich - ein deutscher Jakobiner (1986), Buchstabenzeit (poems; 1987) and Zweiter Hand (novel; 1987).
