= Rheinhessen-Pfalz =

Rheinhessen-Pfalz Regierungsbezirk Rheinhessen-Pfalz
- Regierungsbezirk
- Map of Rhineland-Palatinate highlighting the former Regierungsbezirk of Rheinhessen-Pfalz
- Coordinates: 49°21′N 8°09′E
- Country: Germany
- State: Rhineland-Palatinate
- Established: 1968
- Disestablished: 2000-01-01
- Region seat: Neustadt (Weinstraße)

Area
  - Total: 6,851.84 km^{2} (2,645.51 sq mi)

Population (2001)
  - Total: 2,011,381
  - Density: 293.553/km^{2} (760.300/sq mi)

GDP
  - Total: €90.984 billion (2021)

Rheinhessen-Pfalz (rarely anglicized as "Rhine-Hesse-Palatinate") was one of the three Regierungsbezirke of Rhineland-Palatinate, Germany, located in the south of the state. It was created in 1968 out of Regierungsbezirke Rheinhessen and Pfalz, which had themselves been created out of the left-bank territories of Bavaria and Hesse-Darmstadt before World War II.

Since 2000, the employees and assets of the Bezirksregierungen form the Aufsichts- und Dienstleistungsdirektion Trier (Supervisory and Service Directorate Trier) and the Struktur- und Genehmigungsdirektionen (Structural and Approval Directorates) Nord in Koblenz and Süd in Neustadt (Weinstraße). These administrations execute their authority over the whole state, e.g. the ADD Trier oversees all schools.

Kreise
(districts)

- Alzey-Worms
- Bad Dürkheim
- Donnersbergkreis
- Germersheim
- Kaiserslautern
- Kusel
- Rhein-Pfalz-Kreis (formerly Ludwigshafen)
- Mainz-Bingen
- Südliche Weinstraße
- Südwestpfalz

Kreisfreie Städte
(district-free towns)

- Frankenthal
- Kaiserslautern
- Landau
- Ludwigshafen
- Mainz
- Neustadt (Weinstraße)
- Pirmasens
- Speyer
- Worms
- Zweibrücken
