= Aschbach, Rhineland-Palatinate =

Aschbach
- Municipality
- Coat of arms

- Location of Aschbach within Kusel district
- Interactive map of Aschbach
- Location within Germany Location within Rhineland-Palatinate
- Coordinates: 49°36′1″N 7°34′37″E
- Country: Germany
- State: Rhineland-Palatinate
- District: Kusel
- Municipal assoc.: Lauterecken-Wolfstein

Government
  - Mayor (2019–24): Birgit Wamsbach

Area
  - Total: 4.46 km^{2} (1.72 sq mi)
- Elevation: 270 m (890 ft)

Population (2025-12-31)
  - Total: 299
  - Density: 67.0/km^{2} (174/sq mi)
- Time zone: UTC+01:00 (CET)
  - Summer (DST): UTC+02:00 (CEST)
- Postal codes: 67753
- Dialling codes: 06304
- Vehicle registration: KUS

Aschbach (German pronunciation: [ˈaʃbax]) is an Ortsgemeinde – a municipality belonging to a Verbandsgemeinde, a kind of collective municipality – in the Kusel district in Rhineland-Palatinate, Germany. It belongs to the Verbandsgemeinde Lauterecken-Wolfstein.

== Geography ==
=== Location ===
The municipality lies on the north side of the Königsberg, a mountain in the North Palatine Uplands, in the narrow valley of the like-named brook, the Aschbach, some 260 m above sea level. The Aschbach rises on the north slope of the Hahnenkopf, a lesser peak in the Königsberg group, and flows northnorthwestwards towards the Glan. The elevations around the village reach more than 500 m above sea level in the Königsberg area, but otherwise between 300 and 400 m above sea level elsewhere. These are some selected local peaks:

- Hahnenkopf 535 m
- Leienberg 524 m
- Steinchen 435 m
- Rodlingsberg 315 m

The municipal area measures 446 ha, of which 18 ha is settled and 80 ha is wooded.

=== Neighbouring municipalities ===
Aschbach borders in the north on the municipality of Offenbach-Hundheim, in the east on the town of Wolfstein, in the south on the municipality of Eßweiler, in the southwest on the municipality of Oberweiler im Tal, in the west on the municipality of Hinzweiler and in the northwest on the municipality of Nerzweiler. Aschbach also meets the municipalities of Lohnweiler and Rutsweiler an der Lauter at single points in the northeast and southeast respectively.

=== Municipality's layout ===
The village lies mainly as a street village – by some definitions, a thorpe – along Landesstraße 368, which links the Eßweiler Tal (dale) with the Lauter valley and crosses the Aschbach valley. Branching from this thoroughfare are several streets, mostly southwards. The oldest part of the built-up area can be found in the area at the bridge across the Aschbach. Most of the buildings come from the 19th century and the earlier half of the 20th century. Newer building characterizes the village's west end, especially. The first schoolhouse (Hauptstraße 5) was built in 1789, while a further one with two classrooms was built at the turn of the 20th century. The graveyard lies on a sidestreet in the village's east.

== History ==
=== Antiquity ===
The prehistoric archaeological finds from the Aschbach area are among the most important in the Kusel district. As early as 1884 to 1886, Regional Engineer Göring from Kaiserslautern had three barrows opened up. Many objects of worship and everyday use were unearthed, four neckrings, about 15 armrings, six footrings, several rings, many bronze pieces, urn shards and flint arrowheads. An exact itemization of the finds was compiled long ago by Fritz Kleinschmidt. The barrows dated from the Bronze Age, about 1500 BC. Also unearthed by archaeologists was an ironworks next to the path between the hiking car park and Kreuzfeld, south of the former baryte quarry. Other finds from early historical times, namely from Roman times, came to light between Aschbach and Nerzweiler, with what was supposedly the foundations of a Roman bath with six rooms.

=== Middle Ages ===
Aschbach shares a great deal of its mediaeval history with all other villages in the Eßweiler Tal (dale), for in many ways, they together form a unit. Besides Aschbach itself, these were Hundheim (Neuenglan), Hachenbach, Hinzweiler, Nerzweiler, Horschbach, Oberweiler, Elzweiler, Eßweiler and the now vanished villages of Letzweiler, Niederaschbach, Nörweiler, Mittelhofen, Zeizelbach, Füllhof, Neideck and Lanzweiler. It is certain that these villages lay within the Free Imperial Domain around the Royal Castle Lautern. In the 9th century, likely not long before 870, the noble lord Hererich was enfeoffed with the Eßweiler Tal and shortly before his death, he bequeathed it to Prüm Abbey. The ecclesiastical hub of this area was at first the Hirsauer Kirche, a church near Hundheim, which at this time still bore the name Glena or Glan, or possibly Neuenglan (Nieuwen Glena), in contrast to Altenglan (Gleni). This Glena became the seat of a Hund, which, despite the word's meaning in Modern High German ("dog"), was actually an official with an administrative function over the whole dale for the actual owners. Thus, the administrative seat of Glan at the place where the brook emptied into the river Glan now acquired the name Hundheim.

In 1150, the Edelfreier Reinfried founded the Offenbach Monastery together with a kinswoman named Mathilde. The founders transferred the small monastery at Offenbach together with the holdings that they had bequeathed to it to Saint Vincent's Abbey in Metz. Among these holdings was one owned by Reinfried in Aschbach, explaining why the village, along with others, was named in the founding document. From a document made out about 1200, the reader gathers that Emmerich von Löwenstein received from the Counts of Zweibrücken as a fief for service rendered one third of the tithes at Aschbach. In 1377, two inhabitants of Ober Aspach, among many other guarantors, vouched for the nobleman Gerhard von Lauterecken, who swore an oath of loyalty to the Count of Veldenz together with his wife and sons Henne and Heinzmann on pain of having to pay one thousand Gulden if the oath were ever broken. The two men in question were Dyle Baltzen's son Godel and a man named Gerhard.

Even before 1222, Prüm Abbey lost its holdings in the Glan valley, although the circumstances under which this happened are unknown. After this time, the only feudal lords named are the fourteen who exercised special rights in the Eßweiler Tal and who were entitled to draw a share of the tithes, namely:

1. Junker Mühlenstein von Grumbach as the Rhinegraves' vassal;
2. The County Palatine of Zweibrücken;
3. Offenbach Monastery;
4. Remigiusberg Monastery;
5. Tholey Abbey;
6. Enkenbach Convent;
7. The Sulzbach Knights of Saint John Commandry;
8. The Church of Zweibrücken;
9. The Church of Sankt Julian;
10. The Church of Hinzweiler;
11. The Stangenjunker of Lauterecken;
12. The family Blick von Lichtenberg;
13. The Lords of Mauchenheim;
14. The Lords of Mickelheim.

Obviously the feudal lords kept different administrative seats. The Waldgraves and Rhinegraves of Kyrburg, as holders of high jurisdiction, were overlords to the Lords of Mühlenstein (later Cratz von Scharfenstein) at the Hirsauer Kirche and at the Springeburg (castle). The Counts of Veldenz, as lords of the dale's "poor people" (as of 1444 the Counts Palatine of Zweibrücken), chose Nerzweiler as their seat. Nerzweiler was always named in documents between 1350 and 1446 as the seat of the Nerzweiler Amt. Indeed, in the 14th century, as witnessed by a 1393 Veldenz letter of bestowal, the two villages of Oberaschbach and Unteraschbach belonged to this Amt of Nerzweiler. Count Friedrich III of Veldenz bequeathed the Amt to his wife, Margarethe von Nassau-Saarbrücken, to provide for her in case of widowhood (an arrangement called a Wittum). After 1446, Hundheim appeared once again as the only administrative seat. Hinzweiler acquired its own church in 1451 and thereby took over from Hirsau as the Eßweiler Tal parish's ecclesiastical hub. Having a great number of feudal lords obviously led to greater freedoms than in other regions, where unified power and governmental structures prevailed. Questions of law were governed in the Eßweiler Tal by a series of Weistümer (singular: Weistum; cognate with English wisdom, this was a legal pronouncement issued by men learned in law in the Middle Ages and early modern times) that were already in force in the Middle Ages, although only in the early 16th century were they put into writing. These have been preserved down to the present day and are now held to be prime examples of mediaeval jurisprudence.

Aschbach was a relatively rich village in the Late Middle Ages. In 1477, twelve families had to pay both the May tax (Maibede) and the autumn tax (Herbstbede). That was almost every family living in the village. By way of comparison, in the then somewhat smaller village of Nerzweiler, only two families paid taxes.

=== Modern times ===
In 1526, the Reformation was introduced into the Eßweiler Tal. In the course of the 16th century, the Plague raged in the dale, and the villages were depopulated. In Aschbach itself, apparently only 12 people survived the epidemic. With regard to manorial relations, there was a change due to this situation in 1595 that saw high jurisdiction, hitherto held by the Waldgraves and Rhinegraves for some 250 years, transferred to the Counts Palatine of Zweibrücken. In return for this, Count Palatine Johannes I of Zweibrücken let the Rhinegraves have the village of Kirchenbollenbach near (and now a constituent community of) Idar-Oberstein. High jurisdiction and lordly rule over the "poor people" were thereby in one lordship's hands, although the other feudal lords still had the same rights to their shares of the tithes in the various villages as before. In 1614, Count Palatine (Duke) Johannes II of Zweibrücken traded his serfs in Teschenmoschel for Baron Johann Gottfried von Sickingen's serfs in Schallodenbach and the Eßweiler Tal. Aschbach also suffered in the Thirty Years' War. While only the odd person survived this war in other villages, Aschbach already once again had 11 families in 1675 (27 years after the war ended). It may be assumed that losses were less heavy here than they were farther up the Glan valley. There may indeed have been newcomers among those 11 families who had come to settle. A new, fundamental change in the territorial arrangement came to pass in 1755. It was then that Duke Christian IV transferred the Offenbach Monastery, along with the villages of Aschbach, Hundheim, Nerzweiler, Hinzweiler and Oberweiler, and the Hirsauer Kirche, to the Rhinegraves of Grumbach, who had exercised high jurisdiction in these villages until 1595. The actual count at this time was Rhinegrave Karl Walram von Grumbach. Aschbach thereby remained under Rhinegravial rule until the old feudal order was swept away in the events of the French Revolution.

==== Recent times ====
In French Revolutionary and Napoleonic times, the German lands on the Rhine's left bank were annexed by France, which brought about the abolition of all hitherto existing borders and the founding of new French departments. Roughly, the river Glan formed the boundary between the Departments of Sarre and Mont-Tonnerre (or Donnersberg in German). Aschbach was grouped, along with the villages of Nerzweiler, Hinzweiler, Hachenbach and Gumbsweiler, into the Mairie ("Mayoralty") of Hundheim. After Napoleon's defeat at Waterloo in 1815, a new entity came into being under the terms of the Congress of Vienna after a transition period. It was the Bavarian Rheinkreis, a new exclave in the Palatinate ruled by the Kingdom of Bavaria; it later came to be called the bayerische Rheinpfalz ("Bavarian Rhenish Palatinate"). Aschbach now belonged to the Bürgermeisterei ("Mayoralty") of Hundheim in the Canton (District) of Lauterecken and in the Landkommissariat (later Bezirksamt, and later still Landkreis, or district) of Kusel. Further changes came with the 1968 regional and administrative reform in Rhineland-Palatinate. Since 1971, the Ortsgemeinde of Aschbach has belonged within the Kusel district to the Verbandsgemeinde of Wolfstein.

=== Population development ===
Aschbach was quite a small village throughout the Middle Ages, but had broad and fertile fields, which meant that the inhabitants had to pay more in taxes than those in neighbouring villages of comparable size. Nevertheless, the village's livelihood was threatened, foremost by epidemics, but also by wars. Neighbouring Niederaschbach's destruction by marauding soldiers of the Count of Armagnac proves that the Thirty Years' War was not the only war that could burn whole villages down and utterly lay them waste. The village's people earned their livelihood mainly from agriculture, although those who wished could seek work at one of the many coal, quicksilver, baryte and chalk mines both right nearby and a bit farther afield. Right near Aschbach itself were a baryte pit and a chalk quarry. In the 19th and early 20th centuries, some of the village's inhabitants travelled the world as Wandermusikanten, performing music in many different countries. In 1909, there were 73 of these Wandermusikanten in Aschbach. Among the most famous was Rudolf Mersy, who was known as the Aschbacher Mozart (for more information, see the West Palatine travelling music tradition (Musikantentum) and the two relevant sections of the Hinzweiler article).

Living in Aschbach in 1609 were 85 persons in 17 families. In a 1743 statistical work, of 19 "family fathers" – household heads – 17 were said to be free subjects and 2 were Hintersassen (roughly, "dependent peasants"). Among those working in handicrafts, who only worked the land as a secondary occupation, were one shoemaker, two linen weavers, one tailor and one bricklayer. Essentially, this vocational structure held true well into the 20th century. Most of the inhabitants nowadays must earn a living outside the village. In the late 18th century, Jews settled in Aschbach. In 1825 there were 29 Jews among the village's 314 inhabitants. The population figure rose quite swiftly beginning in the mid 18th century, reaching a peak of 452 in the latter half of the 19th century. The subsequent drop lasting until the turn of the century was due mainly to emigration. There was an upswing again lasting until the First World War, but ever since, the population has been gradually shrinking, a trend that seems likely to continue into the future. Coming along with this drop in population has been definite growth in the numbers of elderly villagers.

The following table shows population development over the centuries for Aschbach:

| Year | 1609 | 1675 | 1745 | 1825 | 1835 | 1850 | 1867 | 1875 | 1885 | 1900 | 1910 | 1939 | 1999 | 2007 |
| Total | 85 | 60 | 101 | 314 | 378 | 417 | 452 | 404 | 380 | 415 | 407 | 390 | 375 | 355 |

=== Municipality's name ===
The first syllable of the name Aschbach, according to researchers Dolch and Greule, comes from the Old High German word Ask, meaning (and cognate with the English word) "ash" (the Old English cognate was æsc), or perhaps from the word Aspa, meaning "(quaking) aspen" (this is also cognate with its English counterpart; in Old English it was æspe). Whatever the first syllable's origin might have been, the second syllable is the common German placename ending —bach, which means "brook". According to this theory, the name Aschbach could mean "place near the ashes/aspens". The village might have arisen in the 8th or 9th century. As early as 1150, the village's name appeared as Hasbach in the Offenbach Monastery's foundation document. Further mentions of the name rendered it Asbach (about 1250), Oberasbach (1377) or Haspach (1594). The current form, Aschbach, only appeared in the 19th century.

=== Vanished villages ===
The former village of Niederaschbach, which was always named in old documents as one of the Eßweiler Tal villages, lay northwest of today's village of Aschbach, which itself was once known as Oberaschbach (Ober— and Nieder— are cognate with English "over" and "nether", and mean "upper" and "lower", respectively). Johannes Hofmann had this to say about Niederaschbach in 1595 (the village had already been forsaken by that time): "In this Aschbach Ground, a rifle shot from the Glan, lay the village of Niederaschbach, of which only old walls are now to be seen. Was a great village, which, as the old people say, was made to suffer a war and a fire by the old Gerken, or Armagnacs as they call themselves." The Armagnacs were a cohort of mercenaries under the French Count of Armagnac Bernard VII, who in the early 15th century waged a war against the Duke of Burgundy, John the Fearless, and later Philip the Good. After the war, the troops marauded their way to the Rhine. They were beaten in 1444 in a battle near Basel by a Swiss army, suffering great losses in the process. Thus, it is assumed that Niederaschbach (in 1393 called Nieder Aspach) was utterly destroyed a few years before that battle.

Within what are now Aschbach's municipal limits were once two other villages, Nörweiler and Mittelhofen. Both lay northeast of today's village of Aschbach and were likewise both mentioned in Johannes Hofmann's 1595 description of the Eßweiler Tal. According to that, Mittelhofen lay between Aschbach and Nörweiler. While Nörweiler was mentioned only in Hofmann's writings, Mittelhofen was further mentioned in a 1544 document. Both these villages vanished long before the Thirty Years' War.

== Religion ==
Originally, the Hirsauer Kirche, a church near Hundheim (pictured in the Offenbach-Hundheim article), was the ecclesiastical hub for all the villages in the Eßweiler Tal. After a church was also built in Hinzweiler in 1451, Hinzweiler bit by bit took over this function. This actually brought about competition between the two churches. As early as 1526, the Duchy of Palatinate-Zweibrücken introduced the Reformation into the church of the Oberamt of Meisenheim, replacing Catholic belief with Martin Luther's teachings so that bit by bit, church services in the Eßweiler Tal, too, began to be conducted in accordance with the Reformation. The Offenbach Monastery, to which the Hinzweiler church was subject, at first opposed Reformist efforts. In 1555, though, the Rhinegraves of Grumbach, too, introduced the Reformation, and in 1588, the Offenbach Monastery was dissolved.

After the Counts Palatine of Zweibrücken had become the sovereign feudal lords over the Eßweiler Tal in 1595, believers had to conform with the current religious developments in the County Palatine, and thus converted, following the precept of cuius regio, eius religio, to John Calvin's Reformed teachings. After the Thirty Years' War had ended, Hinzweiler had managed to make itself "mother church" to the whole dale, a state of affairs unchanged to this day.

Denominationally, Aschbach inhabitants were, in earlier times, overwhelmingly Reformed, that is to say, Calvinist. The Reformed and Lutheran Churches, however, united in 1819 in the Palatine Protestant Union. Jews settled in Aschbach in the late 18th century. For a time, their share of the population even reached 10%. In later times, there were only a few Catholic Christians in Aschbach. In the early 19th century, there were roughly five. Even today, their share of the population is not great. In 1961 there were 13 (roughly 5%). To this day, Catholics attend worship at the church in Offenbach.

In 1825, Aschbach had 280 Protestants, 5 Catholics and 29 Jews. In 1961, these figures were 369, 13 and 0 respectively.

== Politics ==
=== Municipal council ===
The council is made up of 8 council members, who were elected by majority vote at the municipal election held on 7 June 2009, and the honorary mayor as chairman.

=== Mayor ===
Aschbach's mayor is Birgit Wamsbach.

=== Coat of arms ===
The German blazon reads: Unter gewelltem blauen Schildhaupt, darin ein nach links gewendetes goldenes Eschenblatt, in Gold ein schreitender blau bewehrter und bezwungener roter Löwe.

The municipality's arms might in English heraldic language be described thus: Or a lion rampant gules armed and langued azure, on a chief wavy of the third an ash leaf slipped palewise, the stem to dexter, of the first.

The main charge, the lion, is a reference to the village's former allegiance to the Rhinegraves of Grumbach. The charge on the chief, the ash leaf on a blue field, is said to refer to the ash trees on the brook.

== Culture and sightseeing ==
=== Buildings ===
The following are listed buildings or sites in Rhineland-Palatinate's Directory of Cultural Monuments:

- Hauptstraße 14 – Quereinhaus (a combination residential and commercial house divided for these two purposes down the middle, perpendicularly to the street), 1798
- Pitzerstraße 1 – barn, timber-frame building, partly solid, 17th century (?)

=== Regular events ===
The municipality celebrates its kermis (church consecration festival) on the second weekend in September.

== Economy and infrastructure ==
=== Economic structure ===
Of the many mines that were run in bygone days in the broader area around the Königsberg and the Herrmannsberg, only two were right near Aschbach, a baryte pit and a chalk mine. Otherwise, the most important part of the economy was originally agriculture, besides the area's well known Wandermusikantentum (see Population development above). The structure of agricultural operations has changed fundamentally since the Second World War. Most members of the workforce must nowadays seek a living outside the village. In Aschbach itself, though, can be found a variety of shops. There is also a branch of the Volksbank Kaiserslautern in Aschbach.

=== Transport ===
Aschbach lies on Landesstraße 368, which links Hinzweiler (on Landesstraße 273) with the road running through the Lauter valley (Bundesstraße 270), which runs to Aschbach's east. The Kusel and Kaiserslautern Autobahn interchanges each lie some 30 km away. Serving Wolfstein-Reckweilerhof, about 8 km away, is a railway station on the Lautertalbahn.

=== Education ===
The educational establishment experienced a general upswing beginning in the time of the Reformation, but this ended with the Thirty Years' War. Little is known today about the beginnings of school in Aschbach. A record from 1784 tells of a school authority candidate named Ludwig Klein from Brenschelbach who was running a winter school (a school geared towards an agricultural community's practical needs, held in the winter, when farm families had a bit more time to spare) in Aschbach. Year-round schooling came along only in the earlier half of the 19th century, when Aschbach belonged to the Kingdom of Bavaria. In 1819, the municipality hired the candidate Ludwig Berger from Wiesbach as schoolteacher. Classes were held in summer and winter at the house at Bachstraße 7. In 1827, the municipality acquired the house at Bachstraße 5, and there had the village's first schoolhouse built, which in 1831 had a belltower added to it. In 1900, a new schoolhouse was built, and for the time being, the bells stayed at the old schoolhouse. In 1942, however, during the Second World War, they were taken away for munitions production. In 1950, the newer schoolhouse (now 50 years old) also got a belltower, leaving it to the municipality to acquire new bells. In 1970, the now defunct Regierungsbezirk administration had the school closed for good, after a time during which only primary school pupils had been taught there. The schoolhouse stood empty for a few years before the municipality eventually sold it to a private citizen. Primary school pupils and Hauptschule students nowadays attend their respective schools in Wolfstein. The nearest Gymnasium is one in Lauterecken.

== Famous people ==
=== Sons and daughters of the town ===
Rudolf Mersy (b. 2 October 1867; d. 30 May 1949 in Aschbach) – Folk musician and composer, born in Aschbach, spent his childhood as a travelling musician's son in Edinburgh, beginning in 1885 lived once more in his home village, only to go travelling again later (Australia, New Zealand). The last decade of his life was spent back in his homeland. Mersy composed more than 600 pieces of music and his contemporaries called him the Aschbacher Mozart.
