= Lohnweiler =

- Municipality
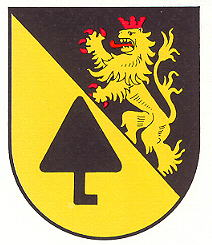
- Coat of arms

- Location of Lohnweiler within Kusel district
- Interactive map of Lohnweiler
- Location within Germany Location within Rhineland-Palatinate
- Coordinates: 49°38′9″N 7°35′51″E
- Country: Germany
- State: Rhineland-Palatinate
- District: Kusel
- Municipal assoc.: Lauterecken-Wolfstein

Government
  - Mayor (2019–24): Thomas Knecht

Area
  - Total: 4.91 km^{2} (1.90 sq mi)
- Elevation: 190 m (620 ft)

Population (2025-12-31)
  - Total: 359
  - Density: 73.1/km^{2} (189/sq mi)
- Time zone: UTC+01:00 (CET)
  - Summer (DST): UTC+02:00 (CEST)
- Postal codes: 67744
- Dialling codes: 06382
- Vehicle registration: KUS

Lohnweiler is an Ortsgemeinde – a municipality belonging to a Verbandsgemeinde, a kind of collective municipality – in the Kusel district in Rhineland-Palatinate, Germany. It belongs to the Verbandsgemeinde Lauterecken-Wolfstein.

== Geography ==
=== Location ===
The municipality lies in the Lauter valley in the North Palatine Uplands. Lohnweiler lies at an elevation of roughly 165 m above sea level only about a kilometre south of the town of Lauterecken at the mouth of the Koppbach (or Mausbach), whose valley stretches off to the southwest. The elevations around the village reach heights of almost 340 m above sea level (Silberkopf 337 m, Dumpf 318 m, Leienberg 311 m). The municipal area measures 491 ha, of which roughly 20 ha is settled and 139 ha is wooded.

=== Neighbouring municipalities ===
Lohnweiler borders in the north on the town of Lauterecken, in the northeast on the municipality of Hohenöllen, in the southeast on the municipality of Heinzenhausen, in the south on the town of Wolfstein, in the southwest on the municipality of Offenbach-Hundheim and in the west on the municipality of Wiesweiler. Lohnweiler also meets the municipality of Aschbach at a single point in the southwest.

=== Municipality’s layout ===
The village core lies along with its church and former school on the left bank of the river Lauter's (also called the Waldlauter, to distinguish it from other rivers in German-speaking Europe named Lauter), in the outlet of the Mausbach valley, on both sides of a snaking road that bends to the south and continues as a country lane. From the village core, further streets with new building zones branch off to the north and south. East of this village core on the Lauter's left bank runs the Lauter Valley Railway, and over on the right bank runs Bundesstraße 270 in a less heavily settled area. The graveyard lies south of the village core.

== History ==
=== Antiquity ===
It is certain that the area around the village was settled as long ago as prehistoric times, bearing witness to which is a wealth of archaeological finds within the municipality's limits. Two stone hatchets have been unearthed here, one near the village in the field called “Im Flur” and the other towards the municipality's southern limits in the Jungenwald (forest). Further finds from the New Stone Age have been potsherds from the Linear Pottery culture and the Rössen culture. Potsherds have also been found from the Iron Age, as has a bronze ring. Some of these objects were once kept at the former school in its own collection. Moreover, within municipal limits lies several groups of, numbering all together about 20, barrows. In 1884, out towards the boundary with Wolfstein, four Celtic graves were unearthed. Found there were neckrings, armrings and footrings, which can now be found at the Historisches Museum in Speyer. Unearthed in Lohnweiler, too, have been various finds from Roman times that are among the most important in the whole district. There have been Roman pieces of brick, potsherds and bronze coins with the emperor's effigy. Of the finds, author Helmut Bernhard wrote in 1990 “On an eastern slope over the Lauter hollow, an extensive estate complex has been known since 1973, from which, during building work several wall lines with hypocaust heating and cellars were dug up. Quite obviously, in this place the main building of a major estate was struck. On the broad sloped surface going down to the Lauter hollow stood the commercial buildings. In 1988, it was possible to unearth a slope wall and a major house. The complex, judging from the few finds, existed at least until the middle of the 4th century. The manor house’s cellar with two wall niches, a light shaft and stairways is preserved on a private property.”

=== Middle Ages ===
What has today become the village of Lohnweiler was likely founded only in the Early Middle Ages, thus making any more precise dating of the founding impossible. The village lay in the Nahegau and later passed to the County of Veldenz when this arose in the earlier half of the 12th century. From this epoch comes a whole series of documents, according to which the Counts of the younger County of Veldenz granted their vassals rights in Lohnweiler. Count Heinrich II of Veldenz thus enfeoffed the “Persuna von Muntfort” with a widow's endowment, made up of the “court and people at Lonewilre, the people at Offenbach and all their migrant workers”. In 1379, the Veldenz vassal Mohr von Sötern declared that he had received from a series of places belonging to His Grace, the Junker Friedrich (actually Count Friedrich II of Veldenz, 1378-1396) holdings, along with some in Lohnweiler. In 1380, Gerhard von Alsenz acknowledged all his Veldenz fiefs, including the income that he drew from levies in Lohnweiler. In turn, his shares in the court and in the people of Lohnweiler were acknowledged in 1417 by the knight Sir Johann Boos von Waldeck to Count Friedrich III of Veldenz (1396-1444). This last fief was newly confirmed in 1422. In 1444, the County of Veldenz met its end when Count Friedrich III of Veldenz died without a male heir. His daughter Anna wed King Ruprecht's son Count Palatine Stephan. By uniting his own Palatine holdings with the now otherwise heirless County of Veldenz – his wife had inherited the county, but not her father's title – and by redeeming the hitherto pledged County of Zweibrücken, Stephan founded a new County Palatine, as whose comital residence he chose the town of Zweibrücken: the County Palatine – later Duchy – of Palatinate-Zweibrücken. Lohnweiler belonged to this new county palatine or duchy.

=== Modern times ===
Under the terms of the Treaty of Marburg of 18 November 1543, a state known as the County Palatine of Veldenz – later Veldenz-Lützelstein – came into being, established by Duke Wolfgang for his uncle Ruprecht as thanks for earlier having taken on, together with Wolfgang's mother (Count Palatine Ludwig II's widow), the regency for the underage Wolfgang, ruling the County Palatine of Zweibrücken for him. Lohnweiler now lay in this new County of Veldenz. Its ruler, Count Palatine Ruprecht, did not enjoy his new lordship for long, dying the very next year. Georg Johannes I of Veldenz-Lauterecken was to succeed him, but having been born in 1543, he was only a baby. During his childhood, Wolfgang ruled the county palatine for him as administrator. Like most of the villages in the Glan area, Lohnweiler, too, had much to suffer in the 17th century's wars, both the Thirty Years' War and French King Louis XIV's wars of conquest. Nevertheless, the nearby residence town of Lauterecken offered the villagers shelter, especially in the Thirty Years' War. Lauterecken was not overrun. Death nonetheless reaped a rich harvest through hunger and the Plague. The County Palatine of Veldenz-Lützelstein was “orphaned” in 1694 by the last ruling Count Palatine, Leopold Ludwig's death, whereupon a dispute arose as to whether the county – and thereby Lohnweiler too – should pass to Electoral Palatinate or the Duchy of Palatinate-Zweibrücken. At first, Zweibrücken, which was then ruled by King of Sweden Karl XI, took ownership of the Ämter of Veldenz and Lauterecken as well as the Remigiusberg. In 1697, Electoral Palatinate troops showed up, and the Amt of Lauterecken was now ruled by Electoral Palatinate. The dispute was settled in 1733 with the Veldenz Succession Treaty of Mannheim, under whose terms the Ämter of Veldenz and Lauterecken passed wholly to Electoral Palatinate, and the former Palatine-Veldenz Amt of Lauterecken was permanently given the status of an Electoral Palatinate Oberamt, after it had already been occupied by Electoral Palatinate troops in 1697 anyway. Johann Goswin Widder wrote in 1788 in his work Geographische Beschreibung der Kur=Pfalz the following about Lohnweiler, among other things: “The current populace is made up of 54 families, working out to 220 souls. The buildings of one church and a school, 45 civic and common houses. The municipal area of 722 Morgen of cropfields, 28 Morgen of vineyards, 55 Morgen of meadows, two and a half Morgen of gardens and 252 Morgen of forest. … The tithes are drawn by the Barons of Boos zu Waldeck in the Dumpf, the landgravial house of Hesse-Darmstadt in the Leyenberg and the Electoral Court Chamber of the New Quarries.” Thus it may be assumed that the Lords Boos von Waldeck held rights in Lohnweiler from the Late Middle Ages to the end of feudal times.

==== Recent times ====
During the time of the French Revolution and the Napoleonic Era that followed, the German lands on the Rhine’s left bank were annexed by France. Running along the Glan was the boundary between the Departments of Sarre and Mont-Tonnerre (or Donnersberg in German). Lohnweiler lay in the latter, and also in the Arrondissement of Kaiserslautern, the Canton of Lauterecken and the Mairie (“Mayoralty”) of Lauterecken. In 1814, the French were driven out of the German lands that they had overrun, and the French departments were soon dissolved and the victorious powers imposed yet a new regional order. The Congress of Vienna annexed the Palatinate to the Kingdom of Bavaria. This brought the unwelcome presence of a border running along the river Glan between Bavaria and, eventually, after a cession, Prussia. Lohnweiler found itself on the Bavarian side, in the exclave known first as the Baierischer Rheinkreis and then later as the Baierische Rheinpfalz (“Bavarian Rhenish Palatinate”), and more locally in the Landcommissariat (later Bezirksamt and Landkreis or district) of Kusel, the Canton of Lauterecken and the Bürgermeisterei (“Mayoralty”) of Lauterecken. In the late 1920s and early 1930s, the Nazi Party (NSDAP) became quite popular in Lohnweiler. In the 1928 Reichstag elections, 14.2% of the local votes went to Adolf Hitler’s party, but by the 1930 Reichstag elections, this had grown to 32.1%. By the time of the 1933 Reichstag elections, after Hitler had already seized power, local support for the Nazis had swollen to 70.9%. Hitler’s success in these elections paved the way for his Enabling Act of 1933 (Ermächtigungsgesetz), thus starting the Third Reich in earnest. After the Second World War, the old Bavarian exclave, which had continued to exist even after the 1871 Unification of Germany and through Imperial times, the First World War, Weimar times, the Third Reich and the Second World War, was now grouped into the then newly founded state of Rhineland-Palatinate. Lohnweiler now lay in the Regierungsbezirk of Pfalz within this state, and then after restructuring in the Regierungsbezirk of Rheinhessen-Pfalz, which has since been dissolved along with Rhineland-Palatinate’s other Regierungsbezirke. In the course of administrative restructuring in Rhineland-Palatinate in 1968, Lohnweiler passed as a self-administering Ortsgemeinde to the Verbandsgemeinde of Lauterecken.

=== Population development ===
The village has remained rurally structured. Even today, the land is still used for agriculture, though the number of farmers has become small. Lohnweiler is thus a small residential community with good employment opportunities in the area’s towns (Lauterecken, Wolfstein). The great majority is Evangelical. The relatively great share of the population held by Catholic Christians is explained by the municipality’s formerly having belonged to Electoral Palatinate.

The following table shows population development over the centuries for Lohnweiler:

Year	1788	1815	1860	1871	1905	1939	1961	2000	2010
Total	220	398	462	446	481	445	439	460	457

=== Municipality’s name ===
In 1326, Lohnweiler had its first documentary mention as Lonewilre off der Lutern, which is known today from a copy of the original document from the early 15th century. Other forms of the name that have cropped up over time are Lonewijlre (1364), Lonwiler und Loenwiler (1483), Loinwiller (1506), Lonwiller (1578) and Lohweiller (1643). The current form first cropped up in 1824. According to researchers Dolch and Greule, the name must have arisen originally from a settlement founded by a man named Lono. Another interpretation holds that the first syllable of the name is from the German word Loh, an archaic word for “woods” (and also cognate with the English word “lea”). The village's name, Lohnweiler, has the common German placename ending —weiler, which as a standalone word means “hamlet” (originally “homestead”).

== Religion ==
Originally, Lohnweiler was an autonomous parish with a church (the Nikolauskirche, or Saint Nicholas’s Church), which stood from the Middle Ages until the 19th century. It is certain that this church was built by Count Friedrich II of Veldenz about 1380, and it is highly likely that there had been forerunners to this church. After Lauterecken had been raised to town, likely in 1349, it might well have been that the nearby village of Lohnweiler could no longer hold its own with regard to religion and became a branch church of the one in Lauterecken. About 1530, under the Dukes of Zweibrücken, the Reformation was introduced, and everybody had to convert to Lutheran belief. A further conversion to Calvinism as in villages in the Duchy of Palatinate-Zweibrücken did not come about in Lohnweiler, for it had been since 1543 grouped into the new County Palatine of Veldenz. Nonetheless, after the Thirty Years' War, conversion to Calvinism, and even back to Catholicism, was allowed. Conversions to Catholicism and settling of Catholics were quite extensive after 1733, after Lohnweiler had become an Electoral Palatinate holding. The church was said throughout the 18th century and right up until it was torn down in 1837 to be a simultaneous church. It was torn down because the faithful could attend church in nearby Lauterecken without too much trouble. Of the 398 inhabitants in 1825, 315 were Evangelical and 52 were Catholic. Jews do not appear in the available statistics.

== Politics ==
=== Municipal council ===
The council is made up of 8 council members, who were elected by majority vote at the municipal election held on 7 June 2009, and the honorary mayor as chairman.

=== Mayor ===
Lohnweiler's mayor is Thomas Knecht.

=== Coat of arms ===
The municipality's arms might be described thus: Per bend Or a linchpin sable and sable a lion rampant of the first armed, langued and crowned gules.

The charge on the sinister (armsbearer's left, viewer's right) side is the Palatine Lion, a reference to the village's former allegiance to the Dukes of the Palatinate. The charge on the dexter (armsbearer's right, viewer's left) side is supposed to be a linchpin, such as might be found on the hub of an old spoked wheel. This is apparently canting for the village's name, for “linchpin” is Lunen in the local speech, or archaically, Lonse (although it is Achsnagel in standard Modern High German). This same device can be seen on village boundary stones from 1750. Another source, though, has a different explanation for this charge, naming it a Lohnen and describing it as a tanner's scraping tool, although it, too, mentions the “linchpin” meaning, and also the meaning of a tool used to bark oaktrees (more useful to the barker than the tanner). The arms have been borne since 7 August 1980 when they were approved by the now defunct Rheinhessen-Pfalz Regierungsbezirk administration in Neustadt an der Weinstraße.

== Culture and sightseeing ==
=== Buildings ===
The following are listed buildings or sites in Rhineland-Palatinate’s Directory of Cultural Monuments:

- Rathausstraße 3 – former school; plastered building on pedestal, 1837, architect Johann Schmeisser, Kusel, gable turret 1872; bell, about 1400 by Otto von Speyer, other bell about 1500
- Römerweg 2 – Roman basement; partly unearthed villa rustica with hypocaust; small basement room with stairways, light shafts and wall niches, about AD 79

The village church – formerly the schoolhouse – has in its belltower two bronze bells that were poured in either the 14th or 15th century at the Disibodenberg Monastery.

=== Regular events ===
Lohnweiler holds its kermis (church consecration festival) on the first weekend in September. Old customs such as were once practised in all Glan area villages can still be found today.

=== Clubs ===
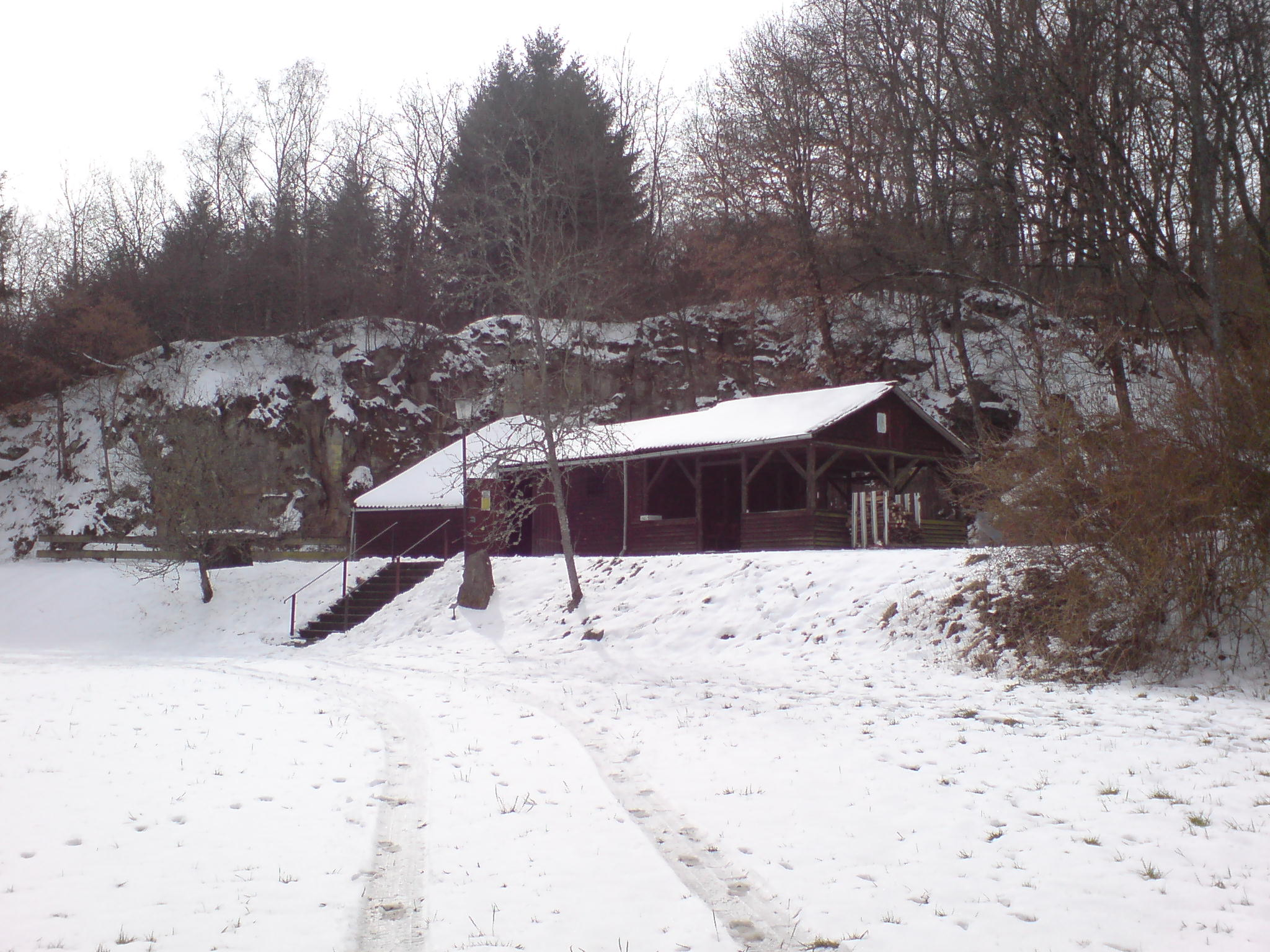
Pfälzerwald-Verein hiking cabin in Lohnweiler

The following clubs are active in Lohnweiler:

- Angelsportverein — angling club
- Freizeit- und Kulturverein — leisure and culture club
- Gesangverein — singing club
- Jagdgenossenschaft — hunting association
- Obst- und Gartenbauverein — fruitgrowing and gardening club
- Pfälzer Bauern- und Winzerschaft — “Palatine Farmers’ and Winemakers’ Association
- Pfälzerwald-Verein — hiking club
- SPD-Ortsverein — Social Democratic Party of Germany local chapter

The Pfälzerwald-Verein also maintains a hiking cabin in Lohnweiler.

== Economy and infrastructure ==
=== Economic structure ===
Besides agriculture, there were formerly also in Lohnweiler the customary craft occupations. Attempts to mine coal within Lohnweiler's limits were unsuccessful. On the Lauter once stood a gristmill and an oilmill. Only a few operations actually work the land nowadays, and the old craft occupations are gone. Instead, there is an advertising agency. There is also still an inn in the village. As a general rule, those seeking work must do so outside the village.

=== Education ===
It is highly likely that as early as the 16th century, there were efforts to teach the village's children to read and write, because the Counts Palatine of Zweibrücken had introduced the Reformation and had a particular interest in having children read the Bible. At first, classes were held in an ordinary house, though according to Widder's report (see Modern times above), Lohnweiler already had a schoolhouse by the late 18th century. In 1837, when the church was torn down, a new schoolhouse arose on the church's former site and still stands today. It was still being used for primary school classes as late as the 2002/2003 school year. Today, all primary school pupils, special school pupils, Hauptschule students and Gymnasium students attend their respective schools in Lauterecken.

=== Transport ===
Lohnweiler lies on Bundesstraße 270 which links Idar-Oberstein with Kaiserslautern. The town of Lauterecken lies only 2 km away, while to each of Kusel and Kaiserslautern it is 30 km. It is also as far to the nearest Autobahn interchanges. Lohnweiler has a railway station on the Lauter Valley Railway (Lautertalbahn, Lauterecken—Kaiserslautern).
