= Herren-Sulzbach =

- Municipality
- Coat of arms

- Location of Herren-Sulzbach within Kusel district
- Interactive map of Herren-Sulzbach
- Location within Germany Location within Rhineland-Palatinate
- Coordinates: 49°38′59″N 7°31′47″E
- Country: Germany
- State: Rhineland-Palatinate
- District: Kusel
- Municipal assoc.: Lauterecken-Wolfstein

Government
  - Mayor (2019–24): Michael Theobaldt

Area
  - Total: 2.92 km^{2} (1.13 sq mi)
- Elevation: 180 m (590 ft)

Population (2025-12-31)
  - Total: 155
  - Density: 53.1/km^{2} (137/sq mi)
- Time zone: UTC+01:00 (CET)
  - Summer (DST): UTC+02:00 (CEST)
- Postal codes: 67742
- Dialling codes: 06788
- Vehicle registration: KUS
- Website: vg-lw.de

Herren-Sulzbach (German pronunciation: [ˈhɛʁən ˈzʊltsbax], “Lords’ Sulzbach”) is an Ortsgemeinde – a municipality belonging to a Verbandsgemeinde, a kind of collective municipality – in the Kusel district in Rhineland-Palatinate, Germany. It belongs to the Verbandsgemeinde Lauterecken-Wolfstein.

== Geography ==
=== Location ===
The municipality lies in the Western Palatinate west of Lauterecken at an elevation of about 300 m above sea level on a brook called the Sulzbach, which rises within municipal limits and then flows less than a kilometre down to the Grumbach, which is also known hereabouts as the Rüllbach. The mountains around the village reach elevations of 340 to 360 m above sea level. The municipal area measures 296 ha, of which roughly 8 ha is settled and 69 ha is wooded.

=== Neighbouring municipalities ===
Herren-Sulzbach borders in the north on the municipality of Merzweiler, in the east on the municipality of Grumbach, in the south on the municipality of Buborn, in the southwest on the municipalities of Deimberg and Kirrweiler and in the west on the municipality of Homberg.

=== Constituent communities ===
Also belonging to Herren-Sulzbach is the outlying centre known as the Feriendorf Rheinpfalz, a holiday village.

=== Municipality’s layout ===
Herren-Sulzbach is a clump village set against a mountain slope, and it has old buildings. The church with its Romanesque building elements stands in the hollow at the village’s upper end. The graveyard lies on the right side of the road that links the village with the Grumbach valley and Bundesstraße 270. There is altogether very little in the way of new building. The former schoolhouse stands at Hauptstraße 22, near the church. It was built in 1849 and expanded in 1890. In 1966, the Evangelical church community built the municipal hall with financial support from the municipality. The holiday village Rheinpfalz came into being in 1970 with 46 holiday dwellings and lies outside the village to the side of the linking road to Bundesstraße 270.

== History ==
=== Antiquity ===
It is assumed that the area around what is now Herren-Sulzbach was already settled in prehistoric times. Nevertheless, such early habitation has yet to be borne out by any archaeological finds from that time. It could be that as early as Gallo-Roman times, a small settlement had arisen within what are now Herren-Sulzbach’s limits. It is very questionable, though, whether this had anything to do with Salisso (see Municipality’s name below).

=== Middle Ages ===
Sulzbach, as a place with a name ending in —bach, was likely founded, like most places with names ending thus, in the 8th century. The village belonged until the early 12th century to the Nahegau, when it passed to the Waldgraves, who may be considered the Nahegau counts’ successors. The church that stands today holds clues in the oldest parts of its building that it must originally have been built about one thousand years ago. Sulzbach was surely the hub of a parish at that early date, too. Modern researchers cannot clearly tell whether the Sulzbach church’s forerunner was a church in the Kirrweiler area that now no longer exists. Whatever the truth is, in 1290, the Herren-Sulzbach church passed into the ownership of the Order of Saint John, which had its seat at first at the Schönbornerhof near Homberg, and then at the Commenturhof in Buborn. The actual convent was eventually moved to Sulzbach. The origin of the Knights of Saint John was a hospital for pilgrims and the sick in Jerusalem. Raymond du Puy de Provence (1083-1160), the order’s first Grand Master (1120-1160) enacted sometime about 1155 the order’s first constitution. The order first quickly spread in Mediterranean Europe. Beginning in 1137, the Knights also took on the task of armed border protection, thereby becoming an ecclesiastical knightly order. In 1309, the order founded on the island of Rhodes a sovereign knightly state. After the Reformation there was, besides the original Catholic branch a new Protestant branch, the Bailiwick of Brandenburg of the Chivalric Order of Saint John of the Hospital at Jerusalem, which persists to this day. Since 1859, the Catholic branch has borne the name Order of Malta. The Order of Saint John acquired in the early 14th century an estate in Herren-Sulzbach, whose buildings were renovated and expanded in the course of time. People first spoke of the altes Gebäu (“old building”), and then later of the Haus Sulzbach. It is believed to have been a stately house with a watermain built of clay pipes. It was fed by a spring, which is still known today as the Pfaffenbrunnen (roughly “Cleric’s Spring”). The Order’s landholds grew considerably in the course of time, mainly through land clearing and endowments. The convent at Sulzbach lost much of its original importance when, in the course of the 14th century, another of the Order’s seats sprang up in Meisenheim, where travel links were more favourable. As greatly important as the Order of Saint John might have been for the village, the Herren-Sulzbach villagers themselves were held to be subjects of the Waldgraves and Rhinegraves. Thus, the village, along with others, was pledged in 1363 by Johann von Dhaun to Sponheim-Starkenburg. Clearly, however, it did not belong to those villages of the court that were pledged in 1443 to the County of Veldenz as the “poor people of Grumbach” and later redeemed by the Waldgraviate. It may have been the knightly order’s importance that kept Herren-Sulzbach out of this pledge.

=== Modern times ===
In the time of the Reformation, the Order of Saint John lost its influence in Herren-Sulzbach. In 1556, under its Grand Master Prince Georg von Schilling, it first pledged all its holdings to the Lordship of Grumbach under Rhinegrave Philipp Franz. In the early 17th century, these holdings passed into the County’s ownership against a price of 3,200 Rhenish guilders, thus ending the village’s relationship with the Order of Saint John. The relationship with the Counts of Grumbach, though, wove itself even more tightly. Beginning in 1606, 62 members of the Rhinegravial house were buried in the crypt at the Herren-Sulzbach church. The village suffered particularly badly during the Thirty Years' War under occupation by foreign troops, and the Plague struck the village, too. Great harm was done by the Spanish troops who passed through the Glan valley in May 1632. In the autumn of that same year, the Plague claimed 38 lives within one month. In schoolteacher Schwarz’s family alone, six people died: his wife and five of their children. Only slowly did the village recover from these losses after the war, only to be stricken with further setbacks in French King Louis XIV’s wars of conquest. Until the time of the French Revolution, Herren-Sulzbach remained under the lordship of the Counts of Grumbach.

==== Recent times ====
During the time of the French Revolution and the Napoleonic era that followed, Herren-Sulzbach belonged to the Mairie (“Mayoralty”) of Grumbach, the Canton of Grumbach, the Arrondissement of Birkenfeld and the Department of Sarre. In 1793, French Revolutionary troops advanced through the Glan valley and stationed themselves in the villages near Grumbach, and this included Sulzbach. One night, some 90 Prussian hussars thrust into the village and, first, led off 40 horses that had been tied up in the village, without being noticed. Then, they slew a few officers who had been staying at the rectory, and other French soldiers in other houses in the village. Later, French soldiers from Grumbach began destroying houses in Sulzbach, but had to withdraw in the face of advancing Prussians. In 1816, Herren-Sulzbach passed under the terms of the Congress of Vienna to the Principality of Lichtenberg, a newly created exclave of the Duchy of Saxe-Coburg-Saalfeld, which as of 1826 became the Duchy of Saxe-Coburg and Gotha. As part of this state, it passed in 1834 to the Kingdom of Prussia, which made this area into the Sankt Wendel district. The former cantons were changed into Prussian Ämter, and Herren-Sulzbach belonged to the Amt of Grumbach. Later, after the First World War, the Treaty of Versailles stipulated, among other things, that 26 of the Sankt Wendel district’s 94 municipalities had to be ceded to the British- and French-occupied Saar. The remaining 68 municipalities then bore the designation “Restkreis St. Wendel-Baumholder”, with the first syllable of Restkreis having the same meaning as in English, in the sense of “left over”. Herren-Sulzbach belonged to this district until 1937, when it, along with the whole Restkreis, was merged into the Birkenfeld district, which up until that time had been an exclave of Oldenburg. This new, bigger Birkenfeld district lay within the Prussian Regierungsbezirk of Koblenz. After the Second World War, the village at first lay within the Regierungsbezirk of Koblenz in the then newly founded state of Rhineland-Palatinate. In the course of administrative restructuring in this state in 1968, the Amt of Grumbach was dissolved. Herren-Sulzbach now passed to the then newly founded Verbandsgemeinde of Lauterecken in the Kusel district, and at the same time it was transferred from the Regierungsbezirk of Koblenz to the then newly founded Regierungsbezirk of Rheinhessen-Pfalz. Rhineland-Palatinate’s Regierungsbezirke have since been dissolved.

=== Population development ===
Herren-Sulzbach has remained rurally structured to this day. Until a few decades ago, the greater part of the population worked mainly at agriculture. Besides the farmers, there were also farmhands, forestry workers, quarrymen and a few craftsmen. There were hardly any other job opportunities. Now that only a few people work at agriculture, most members of the workforce must commute to jobs elsewhere. As early as 1955, there were 52 villagers in the workforce, 46 of whom commuted. Noteworthy is that the population figures during the 19th century did not grow as quickly here as in the neighbouring village of Homberg, and then before the turn of the 21st century, they actually began to shrink steadily.

The following table shows population development over the centuries for Herren-Sulzbach:

| Year | 1815 | 1860 | 1900 | 1925 | 1958 | 2007 |
| Total | 155 | 218 | 225 | 220 | 213 | 185 |

=== Municipality’s name ===
The Romans apparently maintained a post somewhere near what is today Herren-Sulzbach that they called Salisso. Springs that are particularly mineral-laden are found in this area, although the village spring itself is not as remarkable in this way. Over the centuries, the village has borne the following names: Solzbach (1290),Soltzbach (1319) and Herren Sultzbach (1550). Because there are many places with the name Sulzbach, the word Herren (“Lords’”) was prefixed to the village’s name as early as the Middle Ages. It refers to the Order of Saint John, which maintained a convent in the village. In the 17th century, the name prefix disappeared again, only to be revived in 1928 as part of the municipality’s new official name. A further source states that the municipality’s name most likely means “place at the salt spring”.

== Religion ==
From the Early Middle Ages onwards, Sulzbach was the hub of a parish. The current church itself dates, at least in its oldest parts, from the Romanesque period. It was taken over in 1290 by the Order of Saint John. The Order soon owned roughly 500 Morgen (about 160 ha) of land. Sometime in the time that followed, a preceptory arose in Sulzbach. In 1556, the Reformation was introduced. Although the Order remained in existence, even in the Protestant church, they could no longer hold their ground in Sulzbach. In the Waldgravial-Rhinegravial House of Grumbach, the Protestant parish of Herren-Sulzbach was founded that same year. Belonging to it from the beginning were all villages in the Amt of Grumbach but for those that lay on the river Glan. Only in 1808, when Grumbach was raised to a parish in its own right, did the arrangement change. Hausweiler and Merzweiler were then assigned to the newly founded parish of Grumbach. Until the Thirty Years' War, all the villagers were Protestant, but thereafter, other denominations were also tolerated. None, however, ever earned any particular significance. Even today, the overwhelming majority of Herren-Sulzbach inhabitants are Evangelical. Of the original Romanesque church, only the tower is preserved. The churchtower is both a watchtower and a defensive tower. On each side it has arrowslits and on the south side are two jutting stones that served as a support for the drawbridge. In 1714 and 1715, the aisleless, quireless, wooden-roofed nave that still stands today was built. Noteworthy inside is the gallery upon eight-sided wooden pillars whose balustrade bears paintings of Bible stories. These pictures of simple composition are ascribed to the painter Johann Georg Engisch. They were renovated from the ground up in 1971 and 1972. The Stumm organ comes from 1822. Beginning in 1606, the church’s crypt served as the burying place for the Grumbach feudal lords. Among Herren-Sulzbach’s pastors have been a few descendants of the well known Pietist Philipp Jakob Spener (1635-1705), such as Johann Karl Spener, Friedrich Wilhelm Spener, Friedrich Philipp Spener and August Ludwig Jakob Euler. Even the regional historical researcher, Otto Karsch, was the pastor in Sulzbach.

== Politics ==
=== Municipal council ===
The council is made up of 6 council members, who were elected by majority vote at the municipal election held on 25 May 2014, and the honorary mayor as chairman.

=== Mayor ===
Herren-Sulzbach’s mayor is Michael Theobaldt.

=== Coat of arms ===
The municipality’s arms might be described thus: A riband sinister sable between Or a lion rampant sinister gules armed and langued azure and argent a cross Maltese of the third.

The upper charge in the arms, the lion, stands for the village’s former allegiance to the Waldgraves and Rhinegraves, while the other charge, the Maltese cross, is the traditional device borne by the Knights Hospitaller (Order of Saint John), who once held a seat in Herren-Sulzbach. The arms have been borne since 1964 when they were approved by the Rhineland-Palatinate Ministry of the Interior.

== Culture and sightseeing ==
=== Buildings ===
The following are listed buildings or sites in Rhineland-Palatinate’s Directory of Cultural Monuments:

- Hauptstraße 21 – Evangelical parish church; belltower, about 1075, aisleless church with half-hipped roof, possibly from the 16th century, conversion 1714/1715; fittings, Stumm organ from 1820/1822
- Hauptstraße 22 – former school; five-axis sandstone-framed plastered building, 1849, further floor about 1890; characterizes village’s appearance

=== Regular events ===
Herren-Sulzbach holds its "Kirmes" (church consecration festival) on the third weekend in May. Old customs such as were once common in all villages of the Glan area are otherwise hardly ever observed nowadays.

=== Clubs ===
- Radfahrverein — cycling
- Frauenhilfe — “women’s aid”
- Landfrauenverein — countrywomen’s club
- Gemischter Chor — mixed choir
- Posaunenchor — trombone choir
- DRK-Ortsverein — German Red Cross local chapter
- Förderverein der Freiwilligen Feuerwehr — volunteer fire brigade promotional association
- Verein Heideheck
- Vereinsgemeinschaft — ″association community″

== Economy and infrastructure ==
=== Economic structure ===
In the time after the Second World War, the number of agricultural operations shrank sharply, though the amount of land usable for farming was largely preserved. Thus, the operations still in business became bigger. The main occupation was changed into a secondary occupation. Herren-Sulzbach also produced a number of Wandermusikanten (see the Eßweiler article for more on this phenomenon). Over the last decade, agricultural operations have been being given up. A big building firm has its head office in the village.

=== Education ===
It could be that schoolchildren were being taught in Herren-Sulzbach even before 1600. The church register begun in 1627 mentions a few schoolteachers’ names. In 1632, schoolteacher Jakob Schwarz lost his wife and all his children to the Plague, before he himself died a few weeks later. In the time that followed, the schoolteacher’s post, which involved a one-class school, was continuously occupied. At first, classes were taught at a herdsman’s house, and indeed this was for all schoolchildren from not only Herren-Sulzbach but also every other village in the parish that did not yet have its own school. In 1684, the Rhinegraves transferred to the village a school estate to maintain the teacher. At the same time, the municipality bought an empty house to serve as the schoolhouse. In 1846, a purpose-built schoolhouse, which for those days was quite big for a village school, was built, complete with a teacher’s dwelling. This served as Herren-Sulzbach’s school until it was eventually dissolved in the 1960s. Standing before the building, besides a fountain, were great limetrees. Meanwhile, schools had been springing up in more and more neighbouring villages. The school journals, which were kept beginning in 1877, are still fully preserved in three volumes. They contain exhaustive accounts of events that happened in the village. Schoolteacher Rudolf Licht, who served in Sulzbach from 1905 to 1949, filled one volume of the school journals all by himself. For a time he had as many as 90 pupils to teach in one class. In 1968, the school was dissolved. The last schoolteacher was Hans Joachim Krüger. Afterwards, the primary school pupils at first attended school at the Offenbach primary school while Hauptschule students went to the Offenbach-St. Julian Hauptschule, which had several streams. The old schoolhouse has since passed into private ownership and now serves as a house. There were formerly opportunities for vocational education in Offenbach and Idar-Oberstein. Young farmers could go to agricultural schools in Meisenheim and Baumholder, and after the 1968 regional reform, in Kusel, too. Nowadays, vocational education is only to be had at the vocational colleges in Kusel. Gymnasien are to be found in Lauterecken, Meisenheim and Kusel.

=== Transport ===
Running through the village of Herren-Sulzbach is Kreisstraße 64, which branches off from Bundesstraße 270 at the way out of the village of Grumbach to the north, linking this with Landesstraße 373 near Homberg. The nearest Autobahn interchange is the one near Kusel, some 25 km away. Serving Lauterecken, some 5 km away, is a railway station on the Lautertalbahn.

== Famous people associated with the municipality ==
- Johann Karl Spener (1722-1815) — Revival cleric Philipp Jakob Spener’s great-nephew, Spener came from Oberstein to Sulzbach in 1753 as a pastor and was the estate cleric, was said to be the archetype of a sound character and dared share with the comital lordship his opinions most straightforwardly. In his old age he maintained together with his son a distillery to bolster the pastoral family’s scant budget. He also made and sold silhouettes for the same reason.
- Friedrich Wilhelm Spener (1766-1837) — As Johann Karl Spener’s son, Spener took over his father’s pastoral post in 1793 and played a significant part in reshaping church life in Napoleonic times. He worried greatly about his parishioners’ needs and interests, writing submissions to even the highest governmental offices and founding a lending library for the Canton of Grumbach. Letters from him contain reports about Schinderhannes (a notorious outlaw whose real name was Johannes Bückler) and his band and these are said to be living history from the time when feudalism was swept away to Napoleonic times.
- Otto Karsch (1901-1975) — Karsch came from the Westerwald; he was born in Wickrath. He came to Herren-Sulzbach in 1931 as a pastor and stayed until he retired in 1964. He showed great interest not only in his pastoral work but also in history and local lore. He wrote, among other works, the book Geschichte des Amtes Grumbach (“History of the Amt of Grumbach”).
- Rudolf Licht (1884-1975) — Licht came from Baumholder, arriving in Sulzbach in 1905 as a young schoolteacher. He exhaustively described the situation in the village along with all important events in the school chronicle. He worked in the village as a schoolteacher until 1949, with his service interrupted only by the First World War (1914-1918).
