= Hausweiler =

- Municipality
- Coat of arms

- Location of Hausweiler within Kusel district
- Interactive map of Hausweiler
- Location within Germany Location within Rhineland-Palatinate
- Coordinates: 49°38′51″N 7°33′56″E
- Country: Germany
- State: Rhineland-Palatinate
- District: Kusel
- Municipal assoc.: Lauterecken-Wolfstein

Government
  - Mayor (2019–24): Wolfgang Maurer

Area
  - Total: 1.56 km^{2} (0.60 sq mi)
- Elevation: 190 m (620 ft)

Population (2025-12-31)
  - Total: 43
  - Density: 28/km^{2} (71/sq mi)
- Time zone: UTC+01:00 (CET)
  - Summer (DST): UTC+02:00 (CEST)
- Postal codes: 67742
- Dialling codes: 06382
- Vehicle registration: KUS
- Website: vg-lauterecken.de

Hausweiler is an Ortsgemeinde – a municipality belonging to a Verbandsgemeinde, a kind of collective municipality – in the Kusel district in Rhineland-Palatinate, Germany. It belongs to the Verbandsgemeinde Lauterecken-Wolfstein.

== Geography ==
=== Location ===
The municipality lies in the Western Palatinate, west of the Glan and the town of Lauterecken, on the Kreisstraße to Buborn. Hausweiler lies at an elevation of roughly 200 m above sea level in the Rötelbach valley. The elevations around the village reach heights of about 350 m above sea level. The municipal area measures 156 ha, of which roughly 5 ha is settled and 21 ha is wooded.

=== Neighbouring municipalities ===
Hausweiler borders in the north on the municipality of Grumbach, in the east on the town of Lauterecken, in the southeast on the municipality of Wiesweiler and in the southwest on the municipality of Buborn. Hausweiler also meets the municipality of Herren-Sulzbach at a single point in the west.

=== Municipality’s layout ===
Hausweiler has been thrust together over time to form a clump village whose buildings are old. It is cloven in two by the through road. A small graveyard lies in the village's southwest on the road leading to Buborn. All together, there is very little in the way of building that is new.

== History ==
=== Antiquity ===
It is certain that the area around what is now Hausweiler was settled in prehistoric times. archaeological finds confirming this, however, have only been unearthed in places around the village.

=== Middle Ages ===
Theoretically, this village with the placename ending —weiler may have been settled as far back as the Early Middle Ages by Frankish farmers from a nearby Roman road. Likelier, though, is the assumption that here in the Rötelbach valley, only much later, perhaps as late as the 10th or 11th century, a small settlement (and the word Weiler would apply, for this is German for “hamlet”) arose, which may be considered the seed that grew into today's Hausweiler. The village originally belonged, within the Grumbach castle ban to the Nahegau and passed together with Grumbach in 1258 into Count Godefried's ownership; he endowed the Waldgravial line of Dhaun. Together with other villages in the Grumbach castle ban, it was pledged in 1363 to Sponheim-Starkenburg. In 1347, Hausweiler had its first documentary mention, although the document is now only preserved as a later copy. The document deals with a dispute between Count Heinrich of Veldenz and Provost Johannes of the Remigiusberg over tithes from Pfeffelbach and Hausweiler. In an arbitration it was decreed that the monastery should deliver to the Church of Kusel eight Malter of corn from the tithes (which were very often paid in kind, not in cash) from these two villages. In 1448, Waldgrave and Rhinegrave Gottfried zu Dhaun sold the village of Hausweiler along with a number of others in the Grumbach valley to Count Palatine Stephan of Simmern-Zweibrücken, although he did reserve the right to buy them back. Indeed, the Waldgraves did just that as early as 1477. Shortly thereafter, the independent line of the Rhinegravial House of Grumbach came into being. Henceforth, Hausweiler belonged to this line, until the French Revolution put an end to the age of feudalism. About 1500, the Junker Faust von Wachenheim owned a major estate that, after a number of disputes, ended up in the Rhinegraves’ ownership. The new owners leased the estate to their subject Gerhard Müller from Hausweiler. The lease can be viewed at the Koblenz State Archive. Described precisely therein are the estate's size and location. The lease also names fields and even people who then lived in Hausweiler.

=== Modern times ===
At the beginning of the 16th century, a number of disputes arose between Hausweiler and several neighbouring villages. A grazing cooperative came into being in which, besides Hausweiler, also Buborn, Deimberg and the Schönborner Hof participated. Buborn and Hausweiler, though, felt that they had been hard done by in this deal, and the two of them withdrew from the cooperative, leaving Deimberg and the Schönborner Hof to themselves, thus creating two parties. Time and again, one party would let its livestock graze on the others’ land, or one party's or the other's would wander off and get lost. The common practice at the time allowed one to claim livestock from outside as one's own if it was found on one's own land. Since this happened between the two parties repeatedly, it was not long before a serious disagreement arose between the two parties. It was, however, a long time before the disagreement was settled; the legal proceedings lasted years. In 1575, the Rhinegraves established themselves in the neighbouring village of Grumbach, and Hausweiler's inhabitants were henceforth their subjects. Until the time of the French Revolution, Hausweiler belonged to the lordship of the Rhinegraves of Grumbach. During the Thirty Years' War, the village was repeatedly plundered. Only a few inhabitants survived the war. In 1632, the Spaniards, who were on the Emperor's side, came murdering and pillaging. That same year, the Plague claimed many inhabitants’ lives. In 1635, Croatian troops were making their wrath felt in the region. As Imperial troops, they had had to accept a defeat near Odernheim am Glan and had now advanced up the Glan. Like the inhabitants of so many other villages, the people of Hausweiler left their village and hid themselves in the Winterhauch woodland. Only a few returned to the village. Even after the war ended in 1648, there were still troops marauding over the land. Hausweiler could only recover from this gradually, especially as it also had to suffer in French King Louis XIV’s wars of conquest. During these wars, the inhabitants again fled the village in 1697.

==== Recent times ====
During the time of the French Revolution and the Napoleonic Era that followed, the German lands on the Rhine’s left bank were annexed by France. Hausweiler belonged, during the French administration, to the Mairie (“Mayoralty”) of Grumbach, the Canton of Grumbach, the Arrondissement of Birkenfeld and the Department of Sarre. As early as 1793, French Revolutionary troops advanced up the Glan valley and took quarter in the villages near Grumbach, including Hausweiler. There were assaults by the soldiers against the local people.

In 1816, as a result of the Congress of Vienna, Hausweiler passed to the Principality of Lichtenberg, a newly created exclave of the Duchy of Saxe-Coburg-Saalfeld, which as of 1826 became the Duchy of Saxe-Coburg and Gotha. As part of this state, it passed by sale in 1834 to the Kingdom of Prussia, which made this area into the Sankt Wendel district in the Rhine Province. This district was subdivided into several Ämter, with Hausweiler belonging to the Amt of Grumbach. Later, after the First World War, the Treaty of Versailles stipulated, among other things, that 26 of the Sankt Wendel district's 94 municipalities had to be ceded to the British- and French-occupied Saar. The remaining 68 municipalities then bore the designation “Restkreis St. Wendel-Baumholder”, with the first syllable of Restkreis having the same meaning as in English, in the sense of “left over”. Its seat was at Baumholder. Hausweiler belonged to this district until 1937, when it was transferred to the Birkenfeld district, until then part of Oldenburg. This lay in the Prussian Regierungsbezirk of Koblenz. After the Second World War, Hausweiler at first lay in a Regierungsbezirk of the same name within the then newly founded state of Rhineland-Palatinate. In the course of administrative restructuring in Rhineland-Palatinate, the Amt of Grumbach was dissolved and in 1969, Hausweiler was transferred, this time to the Kusel district, in which it remains today. In 1972, it was transferred to the then newly founded Verbandsgemeinde of Lauterecken, and at the same time from the Regierungsbezirk of Koblenz to the then newly founded (but since dissolved) Regierungsbezirk of Rheinhessen-Pfalz.

=== Population development ===
The village of Hausweiler has to this day remained rurally structured. The greater part of the village's population worked until just a few decades ago mainly at agriculture. Besides farmers, there were farmhands, forestry workers and a few craftsmen. Further earning opportunities were hardly ever to be found. Even today, a few people still work the land. The greater part of the people, though, work outside the village. As early as 1955, of the 19 members of the workforce, 15 had to commute to jobs elsewhere. Today, Hausweiler is held to be the smallest self-administering Ortsgemeinde in the Kusel district. It is feared that, given the current, very low population figure, the downward trend will continue.

The following table shows population development over the centuries for Hausweiler:

Year	1815	1860	1900	1925	1958	1999	2007	2010
Total	23	122	129	97	79	78	78	52

=== Municipality’s name ===
In a copy of a 1347 document, the village is named as Houswyler. Other forms that the name has taken over the centuries are: Huswylre (1363 in an original document), Hußwyler (1443), Hußwiller (about 1500), Hausweiler (1568/1575). The village's name prefix is derived from a Frankish man's name, Huso. It is clear from examining the earlier name forms that it does not come from the German word for “house”, although it is written and pronounced as such today. The placename ending —weiler is derived from the word vilare, meaning “locality” (the standalone German word Weiler today means “hamlet”) and denotes a small settlement with an indefinite founding date. Thus, the name means “Huso’s Place”.

=== Vanished villages ===
Supposedly, within what are now Hausweiler's limits, once stood a place named Birken (“Birches”) during the Middle Ages, but it vanished in the Thirty Years' War.

== Religion ==
From the Early Middle Ages onwards, Hausweiler belonged to the parish of Herren-Sulzbach. The village never had its own church. Hence, Hausweiler's ecclesiastical history is the same as Herren-Sulzbach’s right up until 1808. Then, a new parish of Grumbach was founded, to which Hausweiler, too, was attached. In 1556, the Rhinegraves introduced the Reformation. Until the Thirty Years' War, all Hausweiler’s inhabitants were Protestant. Later, the lordship tolerated other denominations, though these never earned any special importance. To this day, the great majority of the population is, as throughout the parish, Evangelical.

== Politics ==
=== Municipal council ===
The council is made up of 6 council members, who were elected by majority vote at the municipal election held on 7 June 2009, and the honorary mayor as chairman.

=== Mayor ===
Hausweiler’s mayor is Wolfgang Maurer, and his deputies are Klaus Hankel and Klaus Volles.

=== Coat of arms ===
The municipality’s arms might be described thus: Per bend sinister Or a lion rampant sinister gules armed and langued azure and vert in base an attire of four points fesswise above which a birch leaf palewise, both of the first.

The charge on the dexter (armsbearer’s right, viewer’s left) side, the lion, is drawn from the arms once borne by the Waldgraves, among whose holdings was Hausweiler. The antler (“attire” in the blazon) in base refers to the wealth of game in the countryside around the village. The birch leaf on the sinister (armsbearer's left, viewer's right) side is canting for the vanished village of Birken, whose name meant “birches”. The arms have been borne since 1964 when they were approved by the Rhineland-Palatinate Ministry of the Interior.

== Culture and sightseeing ==
=== Buildings ===
The following are listed buildings or sites in Rhineland-Palatinate’s Directory of Cultural Monuments:

- Oberdorf – belltower, two-floor building with gabled roof, 1929, shed

=== Regular events ===
Hausweiler's kermis (an event that is in most places a church consecration festival, but there is no church in Hausweiler) is held on the third weekend in May. Most old customs have fallen by the wayside in Hausweiler, and are hardly practised anymore.

=== Clubs ===
There was long a men's singing club in the village, but now there are reportedly no longer any clubs.

== Economy and infrastructure ==
=== Economic structure ===
In the years following the Second World War, the number of agricultural operations fell sharply, although the amount of agriculturally usable land was largely preserved. Thus, such operations as did still exist expanded. Farms run as main occupations became secondary. Since the mid 1990s, agricultural operations have been being given up one by one.

=== Education ===
As in other villages in the Amt of Grumbach, efforts also arose in Hausweiler in the late 16th century to teach children to read and write as a result of the effects wrought by the Reformation movement. Then, as now, however, the small population figure saw to it that Hausweiler could not build its own schoolhouse. Originally, schoolchildren had to attend school in neighbouring Herren-Sulzbach. Classes were held in that village for all the parish's schoolchildren – in a herdsman's house. In 1814, once schoolhouses began appearing in the parish's other villages, Hausweiler joined with Grumbach and formed with the Amt seat a school community, which lasted right up until general school reform began in 1968. Then, at first, primary school pupils attended the Grumbach-Hoppstädten primary school, while Hauptschule students from the beginning went to the Hauptschule in Lauterecken. In 2010, the Grumbach-Hoppstädten primary school was closed, and then the primary school pupils, too, began attending school in Lauterecken. The Gymnasium Lauterecken stands only a few kilometres from the village.

=== Transport ===
To the north runs Bundesstraße 270, from which the village of Hausweiler can be reached over a Kreisstraße. Grumbach and Lauterecken each lie some 3 km away. It is, however, 35 to 45 km to the Autobahn interchanges near Kusel and Kaiserslautern. Serving Lauterecken is a railway station on the Lautertalbahn.
