= Uwe Hartenberger =

German footballer

Personal information
- Date of birth: 1 February 1968 (age 58)
- Place of birth: Lauterecken, West Germany
- Position: Forward

Senior career*
| Years | Team | Apps | (Gls) |
| 1989–1991 | TSG Pfeddersheim | | |
| 1991–1992 | SpVgg Edenkoben | | |
| 1992–1993 | KFC Uerdingen 05 | 4 | (1) |
| 1993 | → Darmstadt 98 (loan) | 8 | (1) |
| 1993–1995 | Reading | | |
| 1995–1997 | Waldhof Mannheim | 8 | (1) |
| 1997–1998 | FSV Zwickau | 8 | (0) |
| 1998–2000 | VfL Osnabrück | 19 | (7) |
| 2000–2001 | Eintracht Trier | 12 | (0) |

Managerial career
- 2001–2003: SV Binsfield (player-coach)
- 2003-?: TuS Jahn Argenthal 1905
- 2007–2009: SV Alemannia Waldalgesheim
- 2011–2018: JFV Hunsrückhöhe Morbach (Youth coordinator)
- 2018–: SC Idar-Oberstein
- * Club domestic league appearances and goals

Uwe Hartenberger (born 1 February 1968) is a German former professional footballer who works as head coach of SC Idar-Oberstein.
