= Carl Christian Brenner =

German-American painter

Carl Christian Brenner (August 1 (or 10), 1838 – July 22, 1888) was a German-born American artist.

== Early life ==
Brenner was born in Lauterecken in the Kingdom of Bavaria (now in the Kusel district in Rhineland-Palatinate) to Frederick Brenner. Brenner attended public school from age 6 to 14, where his artistic talent was recognized by his teacher, who requested permission from King Ludwig I for Brenner to be admitted to the Academy of Fine Arts in Munich. Brenner's father refused consent and trained his son as a glazier.

In 1853, Brenner emigrated with his family to the United States where they first lived in New Orleans. The family moved to Louisville, Kentucky in the winter of 1853–54. There, Brenner found work as a glazier, house painter, and sign painter.

== Art career and style ==
In 1863, Brenner was commissioned by Louisville Masons to paint panoramic Civil War battle scenes inside their lodge. By 1867, Brenner had a studio located at 103 West Jefferson Street in Louisville. He became a professional painter by 1871, by selling his landscapes of Cherokee Park. In his lifetime, Brenner was considered Kentucky's greatest living artist. He was one of a group of Louisville artists known as "Tonalists", whose muted colors evoked mood.

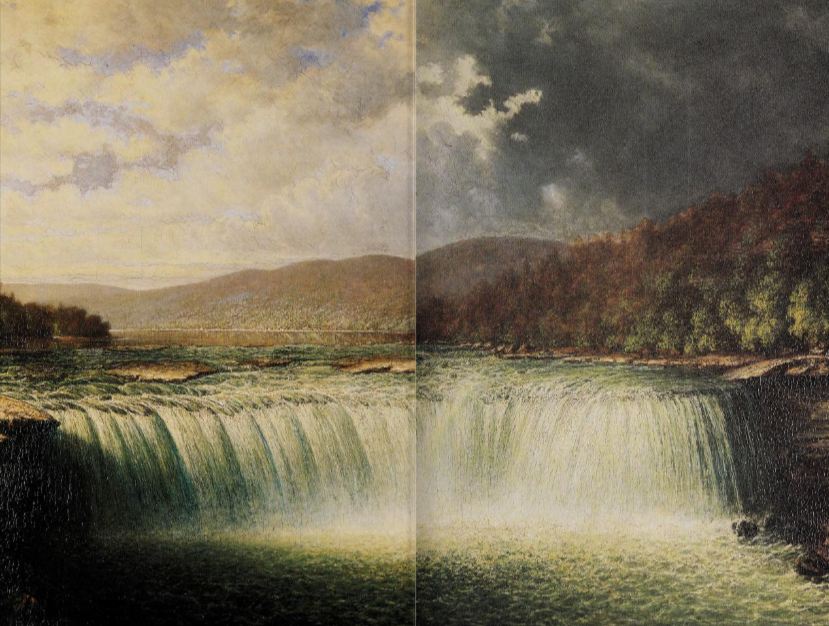
Falls of the Cumberland River, Whitley County, Kentucky

Brenner's works were exhibited at the Louisville Industrial Exposition in 1873 and at the Pennsylvania Academy of Fine Arts in 1876. One of his most notable paintings is Falls of the Cumberland River, Whitley County, Kentucky, executed 1881–82. Brenner became a member of the National Academy of Design in 1877 and remained active until 1886.

His works are collected throughout the United States, including the Corcoran Gallery of Art in Washington, D.C. and the Speed Art Museum in Louisville.

== Personal life and death ==
Brenner married Anna Glass in 1864; together they had six children, of whom Carl Jr. (1865–1929) also became an artist. Brenner died in Louisville on July 22, 1888, and is buried there in St. Louis Cemetery.
