= Lauterecken =

- Town
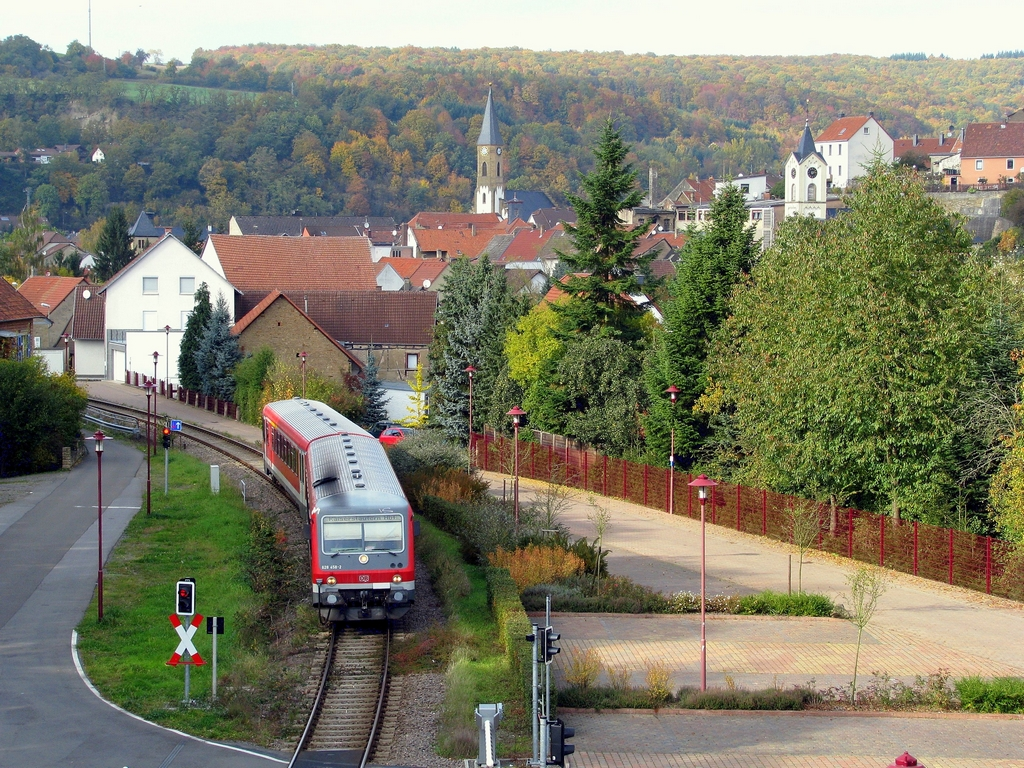

- Coat of arms

- Location of Lauterecken within Kusel district
- Interactive map of Lauterecken
- Location within Germany Location within Rhineland-Palatinate
- Coordinates: 49°38′58″N 7°35′31″E
- Country: Germany
- State: Rhineland-Palatinate
- District: Kusel
- Municipal assoc.: Lauterecken-Wolfstein

Government
  - Mayor (2024–29): Isabel Steinhauer-Theis (CDU)

Area
  - Total: 8.89 km^{2} (3.43 sq mi)
- Elevation: 169 m (554 ft)

Population (2025-12-31)
  - Total: 1,986
  - Density: 223/km^{2} (579/sq mi)
- Time zone: UTC+01:00 (CET)
  - Summer (DST): UTC+02:00 (CEST)
- Postal codes: 67742
- Dialling codes: 06382
- Vehicle registration: KUS
- Website: www.lauterecken.de

Lauterecken (German pronunciation: [ˈlaʊtɐˌʔɛkn̩]) is a town in the Kusel district in Rhineland-Palatinate, Germany. It is the seat of the Verbandsgemeinde Lauterecken-Wolfstein, to which it also belongs. Lauterecken bears the nickname Veldenzstadt, after the comital family that once held sway here. It is also a state-recognized tourism resort town, and in terms of state planning is laid out as a lower centre.

== Geography ==
=== Location ===
The town lies in the North Palatine Uplands in a hollow at the mouth of the Lauter, where it empties into the Glan, and likewise at the mouth of the Grumbach, which also empties into the Glan. Lauterecken lies at an elevation of some 170 m above sea level. Elevations on each side of the dales mostly reach some 300 m above sea level, with the highest elevation being found at the peak known as die Platt (322 m above sea level). Lauterecken is found roughly 20 km northeast of Kusel, and 25 km northwest of Kaiserslautern. The municipal area measures 893 ha, of which 307 ha is wooded.

=== Neighbouring municipalities ===
Lauterecken borders in the northeast on the municipality of Medard, in the east on the municipality of Cronenberg, in the southeast on the municipality of Hohenöllen, in the south on the municipality of Lohnweiler, in the southwest on the municipality of Wiesweiler, in the west on the municipalities of Hausweiler and Grumbach and in the northwest on the municipality of Kappeln and an exclave belonging to the municipality of Grumbach.

=== Climate ===
Yearly precipitation in Lauterecken amounts to 707 mm, which falls into the middle third of the precipitation chart for all Germany. Only at 41% of the German Weather Service's weather stations are lower figures recorded. The driest month is April. The most rainfall comes in June. In that month, precipitation is 1.4 times what it is in April. Precipitation varies only slightly and is spread very evenly over the year. At none of the weather stations are lower seasonal swings recorded.

=== Town’s layout ===
The very dense settlement in Lauterecken's inner town in a sloped location can be traced back to the mediaeval town fortifications, which stretched up the river Lauter southeastwards from its mouth. This old town centre was crossed by the thoroughfare known as the Obere Gasse ("Upper Lane") with its marketplace, which today, together with its extensions bears the name Hauptstraße ("Main Street") throughout the old town. Behind the marketplace stands the Evangelical church, which in its current form dates from 1865–1866, while near the former southeastern town gate, the Obertor ("Upper Gate") stands the Catholic church, which was consecrated in 1853. Further important buildings on Hauptstraße are the former bursary office from 1897 (on the far side of the river Glan, and today a police inspectorate) and the town hall from 1829. Parallel to Hauptstraße, running southwest to the Lauter, is Schlossgasse ("Palace Lane"), formerly known as Untere Gasse ("Lower Lane"), which leads from the Veldenzturm ("Veldenz Tower") along the former town wall to the historic Rheingrafenbrücke ("Rhinegrave’s Bridge"). The beginning of this street also marks the former palace area, which stretched on down to Hauptstraße. One important street, which branches off Hauptstraße near the Evangelical church in the old town towards the eastern slope, is Bergstraße ("Mountain Street"). Still preserved on the lands of the former graveyard on the Igelskopf ("Hedgehog’s Head" – a mountain) is the imposing warriors’ memorial. A new graveyard was laid out in the town's northeast. As early as the late 18th century, Lauterecken was growing beyond the area within the fortifications. In the southwest, the centre of Überlauterecken, already an independent municipality by the Middle Ages, was swallowed up into the spreading town. Originally, this Stadtteil could only be reached across the Rheingrafenbrücke, but nowadays it can be reached by way of a better street, Schiller‌straße, and across the Schillerbrücke. Further expansions arose in the town's south end along Lauterstraße, a street that can be considered a southeastward extension of Hauptstraße, and more recently, new developments have taken in the area between Lauterstraße and the road that leads to Cronenberg. In the north end, off Hauptstraße, Herrenstraße ("Lord’s Street") and Schulstraße ("School Street") were built. Standing on the latter are the former Amt courthouse and, of course, the old schoolhouse, which nowadays houses the elementary school. Likewise in this part of Lauterecken, somewhat off to the side of this street, the modern Verbandsgemeinde administration building was built sometime after 1970. Farther on towards the mountain, stretching in a thoroughly loose pattern, is a major housing development. To the north, Hauptstraße meets Saarbrücker Straße beyond the Glan and the railway line. Also known as Bundesstraße 420, this is a busy highway. Before Hauptstraße meets this road, though, Bahnhofstraße ("Railway Station Street") branches off northeastwards to the post office and, of course, the railway station, from which trains run into the Lauter valley towards Kaiserslautern, and which also serves as a station on the former Glantalbahn (railway) now used recreationally by draisine riders. A great new building zone arose after 1945 in the part of town called "Auf Röth" between Bundesstraße 420 and Bundesstraße 270, which leads towards Grumbach. Also built here was a new school centre with a primary school, a Hauptschule and a Gymnasium. Commercial-industrial operations in Lauterecken are concentrated mainly in the town's north end on Bundesstraße 420.

== History ==
=== Antiquity ===
Already in prehistoric times, mankind was making its presence felt in the lands around what is now the town of Lauterecken as long ago as 5000 BC, leaving its traces in the form of extensive archaeological finds. Artefacts unearthed locally that come from the New Stone Age include a hatchet made of black stone found in the Wälderbusch in 1932, a flint arrowhead from Taubhauser Weg, where an adze was also unearthed, a fragment of a stone hatchet and a tool with an asymmetrical tip, both made of flat stone, and a fragment of a quartzite blade from the Schäferberg. Another from the Bronze Age has been a hoard from the Schäferberg near the town limit with Grumbach with a winged hatchet and two open armrings. Furthermore, there have been finds from the Iron Age or Hallstatt times, and two barrows that have never been explored, and whose origins have not been determined, also lie within town limits in the Jungenwald (forest). The Celts also left a refuge castle on the Marialskopf (mountain) near Medard. In Roman times, the area around the town was rather heavily settled, bearing witness to which are the extensive archaeological finds in Medard and Lohnweiler, for instance. Within Lauterecken's own limits in the late 19th century, a farmer discovered a Gallo-Roman villa rustica. As well, a Roman gravestone was once incorporated into a house wall in the town. Roman roads have been found on the heights around Lauterecken.

=== Middle Ages ===
==== Frankish times and Christianization ====
After the Romans, who had occupied the area for more than three centuries, had withdrawn, the Franks began thrusting into the land, advancing their imperial realm well beyond and westwards into what is now France. After King of the Franks Clovis I had himself baptized in Reims, Christianization was introduced into the Lauterecken area with the creation of missionary centres such as the Hornbach Monastery (founded by Saint Pirmin), Kusel’s Remigiusberg Monastery and Disibodenberg near Odernheim am Glan. It is also to this time that the Counts of Veldenz could trace their history, for the Frankish Bishopric of Veldenz acquired the area around Veldenz on the Moselle from the then Frankish king "for the wine". The bishops then enfeoffed the Counts of Veldenz with this holding. This brought the estate of St. Medard am Glan with Lauterecken and Odenbach together under the Counts of Veldenz.

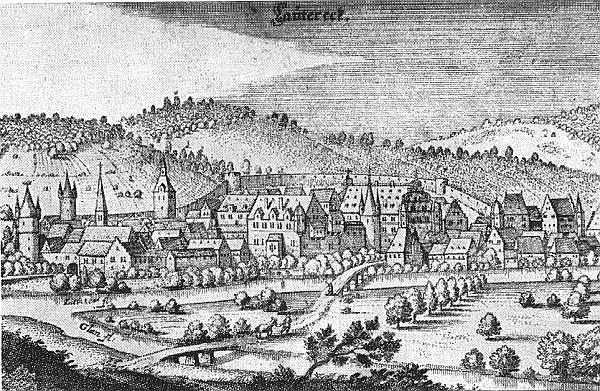
View according to Matthäus Merian

==== Early times ====
Just when Lauterecken was founded is something that cannot be determined with any certainty today. Assuming that the town sprang up alongside a castle, it might have been founded about the year 1000. Older than Lauterecken and of particular importance in the Early Middle Ages was the neighbouring village of Medard, which was held by the Bishopric of Verdun, and which apparently was given by King Childebert II about 580 as a donation to one of the Bishops of Verdun. Within this Verdun holding of Medard rose a castle; a settlement near it came next. It is unknown whether the castle was built on a hill or in a dale (nothing is left of it), but either way, it seems likely that it was built by secular lords, unlawfully. In the early 12th century, it was generally customary to turn the care of relatively unprotected ecclesiastical holdings over to a secular Vogt. It was then that Gerlach I, a scion of the Counts of the Nahegau, who owned little of his own in the way of landholds but held several ecclesiastical Vögteien from the Bishoprics or Archbishoprics of Reims, Mainz and Verdun, founded his own county, which he named after the Verdun landhold of Veldenz on the Moselle. Right from the beginning, a rift opened in these lands between the original ecclesiastical landholders and the counts, who were striving to hold the lands as their own. The bishops’ power steadily ebbed, although it theoretically remained in place until the old lordly structures were swept away in the time of the French Revolution.

==== Veldenz times ====
In 1157, Lauterecken had its first documentary mention as Tiefburg dem von der Domkirche Verdun abhängigen Hofe St. Medard kirchlich zugehörig ("lowland castle belonging ecclesiastically to the estate of St. Medard, which is independent of Verdun Cathedral"). The Counts held sway in four consecutive lines:

1. The Old Veldenz Line (1140-1259)
2. The Veldenz-Gerolseck Line (1259-1444)
3. The Zweibrücken Line (1444-1543)
4. The Principality of Palatinate-Veldenz (1543-1694)

The last named is taken to be the actual "Lauterecken comital line", which characterized the town with the building of two castles, whose appearance is preserved in Matthäus Merian's engraving from about 1650. Thus, from 1543 to 1694, Lauterecken was the residence town of the sideline of Palatinate-Veldenz-Lauterecken. In 1689, however, the town and castles were destroyed. When Count Gerlach I founded the original County of Veldenz, Lauterecken had evidently outstripped the neighbouring village of Medard. Even before 1350 (likely in 1349), Lauterecken had been raised to town. In the latter half of the 14th century, the fortifications sprang up with three gates (Untertor or "Lower Gate", Bergtor or "Mountain Gate", Obertor or "Upper Gate") and five towers, of which three stood near the gravely endangered Lower Gate and two others at corners in the defensive wall (these two can be seen in the Merian engraving). Any attempt by historians to describe a castle integrated into the town fortifications at this early time has come up against considerable difficulties. There can, however, be no doubt that there was a castle complex either within the town or nearby that served a mainly defensive purpose rather than that of simply representing the local lords. In 1384, it was said that the work on the original town fortifications was completed. At the so-called brotherly partition in 1387, Count Friedrich of Veldenz received the town of Lauterecken with its castle and Burgmannen along with a few outlying villages, while Medard passed as a village in the Amt of Odenbach to Count Heinrich. In 1393, Count Friedrich III founded an actual Amt of Lauterecken, which he expanded by adding to the hitherto small region the Ämter of Nerzweiler, Reichenbach and Bosenbach. Belonging to this new Amt were the following places: Albersbach, Aschbach, Bettenhausen, Bosenbach, Eßweiler, Föckelberg, Fockenberg, Gimsbach, Hinzweiler, Hundheim, Jettenbach, Kollweiler, Lauterecken, Limbach, Lohnweiler, Matzenbach, Miesenbach, Mühlbach, Nerzweiler, Neunkirchen am Potzberg, Niedersteegen, Niederstaufenbach, Obermohr, Oberstaufenbach, Obersteegen, Oberweiler im Tal, Reichenbach, Reichenbachstegen, Rothselberg, Rutsweiler am Glan, Schrollbach, Theißberg, Wiesweiler and other places that now no longer exist. In 1444, the County of Veldenz met its end when Count Friedrich III of Veldenz died without a male heir. His daughter Anna wed King Ruprecht's son Count Palatine Stephan. By uniting his own Palatine holdings with the now otherwise heirless County of Veldenz – his wife had inherited the county, but not her father's title – and by redeeming the hitherto pledged County of Zweibrücken, Stephan founded a new County Palatine, as whose comital residence he chose the town of Zweibrücken: the County Palatine Zweibrücken – later a Duchy.

=== Modern times ===
==== Zweibrücken times ====
Once Count Palatine Ludwig II introduced the Reformation into the Duchy of Palatinate Zweibrücken, Lauterecken townsfolk, too, had to convert to Lutheran beliefs. Ludwig II's death from the effects of overindulgence in drink in 1532 at the age of 30 steered the town and Amt of Lauterecken onto a whole new historical course. Ludwig's brother Ruprecht, who had once been a man of the cloth, took on, together with Ludwig's widow the regency for the underage Count Palatine and later Duke Wolfgang, who, as thanks to his uncle, later gave him his own county palatine, which at first was made up of the Ämter of Veldenz and Lauterecken. Ruprecht, who at first had taken up residence on the Remigiusberg, raised Lauterecken to residence town and commissioned the building of a great, representative palatial castle. Soon afterwards, however, in 1544, Ruprecht died, leaving his own underage son and heir, Georg Johannes I of Veldenz-Lauterecken (known as Jerrihans), whose regency was assumed by Duke Wolfgang. Jerrihans became a "mistrustful, most whimsical and withdrawn person who constantly had new plans in his head and plotted his sometimes good thoughts and advantageous designs, which, however, owing to a permanent lack of monies, or of trust of others, could not be carried out." "Georg Hans" did indeed end up in financial trouble, which he sought to overcome, to no avail, with his wife's inheritance, for she was Swedish King Gustav I's daughter. He borrowed monies from the Lords of Mentzingen and from rich townsmen from the city of Strasbourg, which he could never pay back, and he became entangled in a court case before the Reichskammergericht, which lasted long after his death. Many books have appeared about Georg Johannes's life, including one published by Paul Kittel in 2003. In 1566, the Duke managed to expand the duchy by adding Electoral Palatinate territories, in particular the County of Lützelstein in Alsace, where he later moved the seat of his residence. The county palatine now bore the name Veldenz-Lützelstein. During French King Louis XIV's wars of conquest, the county ended up in great distress. Since Lauterecken was, strictly speaking, still a Bishopric of Verdun landhold, the Chambers of Reunion demanded its reunification with France. Leopold Ludwig, the last Count Palatine of Veldenz-Lützelstein, opposed this demand and until the French occupation was over, had to leave the county.

==== Electoral Palatinate times ====
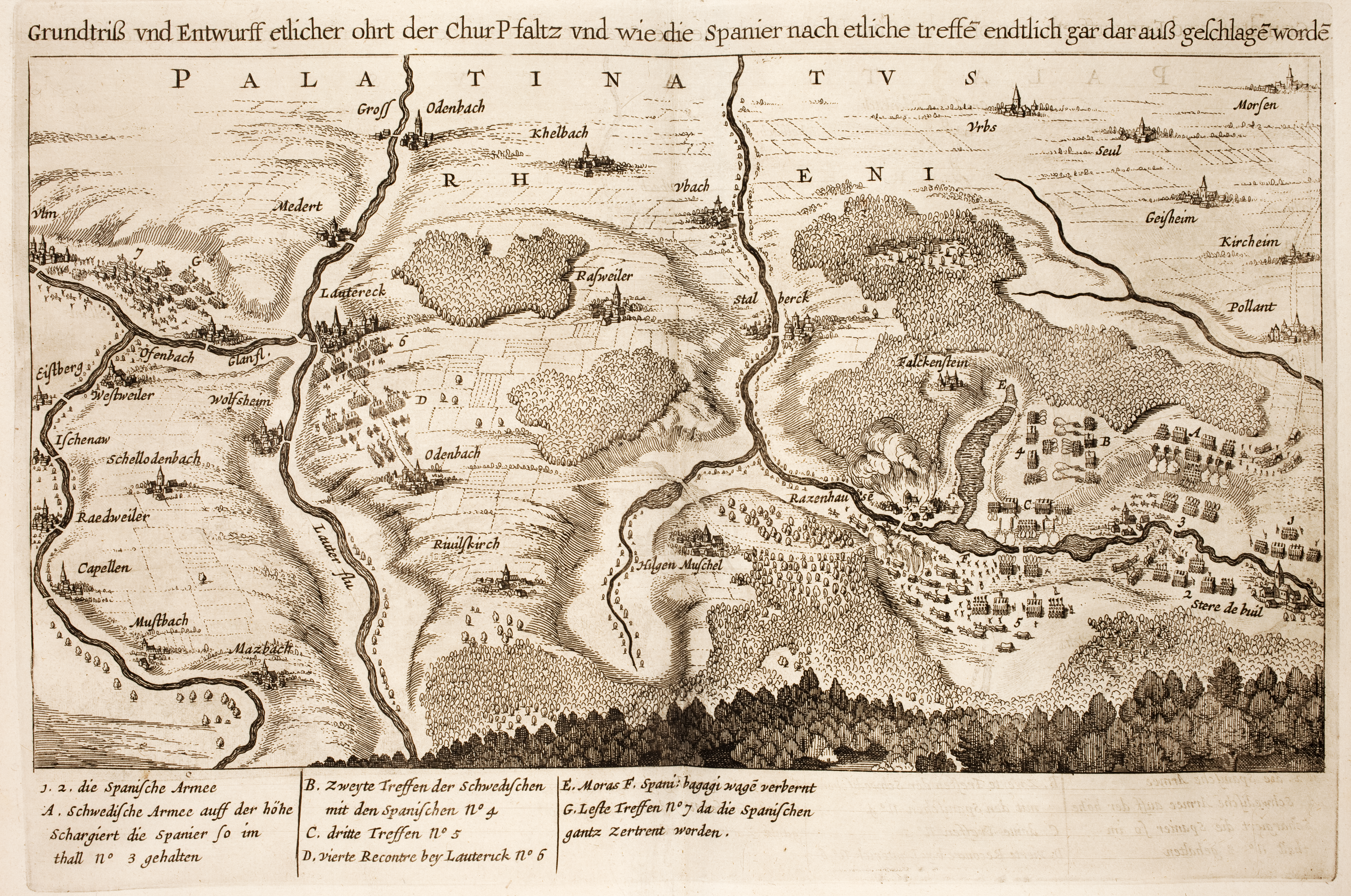
Battle near Lauterecken of Swedish and Spanish troops in the Thirty Years' War, 1632? Matthias Merian in Danckerts Historis 1642.

None of Leopold Ludwig's sons could claim the succession. Gustav Philipp, the eldest, was, for reasons that are no longer clear today, held prisoner in a tower at the palace in Lauterecken, and in 1679, while fleeing custody, he was shot dead in the Wälderbusch (a wilderness area) near the town. Two other sons fell in the war. Leopold Ludwig himself died in 1694. The "orphaned" county was now actually supposed to pass back to the Counts of Palatine Zweibrücken, and indeed, Zweibrücken did at first take over the provisional administration. However, a years-long dispute arose with Electoral Palatinate, which likewise claimed the right of succession in Palatinate-Veldenz. The dispute was settled in 1733 with the Veldenz Succession Treaty of Mannheim, under whose terms the Ämter of Veldenz and Lauterecken passed wholly to Electoral Palatinate, and the former Palatine-Veldenz Amt of Lauterecken was permanently given the status of an Electoral Palatinate Oberamt, after it had already been occupied by Electoral Palatinate troops in 1697 anyway. In 1744, the Electoral Palatinate administration had Lauterecken's town wall torn down. Throughout this time, however, there was little in the way of peace. In the Nine Years' War (known in Germany as the Pfälzischer Erbfolgekrieg, or War of the Palatine Succession), the French Revolutionary Wars and the Napoleonic Wars, troops of every European nationality marched through the Glan valley, much to the local inhabitants’ chagrin. In 1814, Marshal Blücher headquartered himself in the town. The fountain at the old schoolhouse commemorates this.

==== French Revolutionary and Napoleonic times ====
Lauterecken remained with Electoral Palatinate until the region was politically thoroughly restructured in the course of the French Revolution. In the newly established administrative entities that arose after the dissolution of the old feudal structure, Lauterecken lay in the Department of Mont-Tonnerre (or Donnersberg in German) and the Arrondissement of Kaiserslautern, while the town itself became the seat of both a canton and a mairie ("mayoralty") bearing its name. Also belonging to this mairie were the villages of Cronenberg, Heinzenhausen, Hohenöllen and Lohnweiler, while the other mairies in the canton were those of Becherbach, Hundheim and Odenbach. The boundary between the Departments of Mont-Tonnerre and Sarre ran through the Lauterecken area along the river Glan. Places that stood mostly on the river's right bank belonged to Mont-Tonnerre, while those standing mostly on the left bank belonged to Sarre.

==== Bavarian times ====
After the French had withdrawn from the German lands on the Rhine’s left bank in 1814, the French departments were soon dissolved and the victorious powers imposed yet a new regional order. The Congress of Vienna annexed the Palatinate to the Kingdom of Bavaria. This brought the unwelcome presence of a border running along the river Glan between Bavaria and, eventually, after a cession, Prussia. Beginning at Niedereisenbach (Glanbrücken) and going downstream, the Glan now marked the boundary between the "Baierischer Rheinkreis" – a new exclave of the Kingdom of Bavaria created by the Congress of Vienna – and the Principality of Lichtenberg, whose capital was Sankt Wendel, and which was an exclave of the Duchy of Saxe-Coburg-Saalfeld, which as of 1826 became the Duchy of Saxe-Coburg and Gotha. As part of this state, it passed by sale in 1834 to the Kingdom of Prussia. Under this new order, Lauterecken lay within this Rheinkreis beginning in 1816 and was given functions as the seat of a Bürgermeisterei ("mayoralty") and a canton. The canton was assigned to the Landcommissariat (today Landkreis or district) of Kusel. The town played a special rôle in the 1849 Badish-Palatine uprising. At the Lauterecken Revolutionary People's Association, the town clerk Franz König took over the chairmanship and demanded that the town supply 70 Rhenish guilders’ worth of gunpowder and lead, which at first the town refused to do, but then later, after an assembly of the townsmen, it approved the demand. The freedom movement was stronger here than in almost any other place in the Landcommissariat. The extensive money collections and troop recruiting, however, came to naught, for on 13 June 1849, coming from Grumbach, a Prussian division crossed the border to come and quell the uprising. In 1852, the Catholic church was built, and in 1862 the Protestant church. These replaced the former simultaneous church, which had had to be shared by the denominations. Even during the Austro-Prussian War (1866), there was no fighting in Lauterecken. The only wartime event was a Prussian demand for four horses. In both the Franco-Prussian War (1871-1872) and the First World War (1914-1918), troops marched through the Glan valley time and again. Changes in territorial arrangements were hardly ever made until after the Second World War. The entity known as the canton lost any meaning in the course of the 19th century.

==== Imperial times ====
In 1883, the Lautertalbahn (railway) was built, and in 1896/1897 came the now abandoned Lauterecken-Staudernheim line. In 1904, the strategic railway line from Lauterecken to Altenglan was built. Ten years later, troop transport trains were running on the line towards France, while hospital and prisoner trains ran in the other direction. It was similar in the Second World War. Seventy men from Lauterecken did not return from the fighting in the First World War, and in the Second, 167 either fell or went missing in action. Moreover, the town itself lost 56 women, old men and children in bombing raids. Three memorials, one at Veldenzplatz, one on the Igelskopf ("Hedgehog’s Head" – a mountain) and one at the new graveyard remind visitors to keep the peace.

==== Weimar and National Socialist times ====
In the late 1920s and early 1930s, the Nazi Party (NSDAP) became quite popular in Lauterecken. In the 1928 Reichstag elections, 16.5% of the local votes went to Adolf Hitler’s party, but by the 1930 Reichstag elections, this had grown to 25.1%. By the time of the 1933 Reichstag elections, after Hitler had already seized power, local support for the Nazis had swollen to 50.3%. Hitler’s success in these elections paved the way for his Enabling Act of 1933 (Ermächtigungsgesetz), thus starting the Third Reich in earnest. In the Second World War in the town itself, roughly 60 people were killed in air raids.

==== Since the Second World War ====
The Palatinate’s split from Bavaria came about after the war through the new territorial order imposed in the French zone of occupation, and it was merged into the new state of Rhineland-Palatinate, formed in 1946 by French General Marie-Pierre Kœnig, and Lauterecken was grouped into the Regierungsbezirk of Pfalz ("Palatinate"), whose seat was at Neustadt an der Weinstraße. The town then experienced an enormous upswing. In 1954, "Progymnasium" (that is, Gymnasium that does not have the upper grades) came to Lauterecken, and in the years that followed, it became a full Gymnasium. In the 1968/1969 school year, it moved to a new building. In 1954, the textile mill began work as an offshoot of the company Vogtländische Spinnerei Hof. More businesses were brought to town, so that today, Lauterecken boasts more than 1,000 jobs. In the course of administrative restructuring in Rhineland-Palatinate in 1968, the old Bürgermeistereien were dissolved. In 1972, Lauterecken became, after many authorities, such as the office of weights and measures, the financial office, the local court and the customs office had been withdrawn from the town, the seat of a Verbandsgemeinde administration within the Kusel district with all together 25 Ortsgemeinden.

=== Population development ===
The following table shows population development over the centuries for Lauterecken, with some figures broken down by religious denomination:

Year	1787	1814	1825	1840	1864	1905	1939	1961	1969	2003	2007
Total	607	825	974	1,231	1,208	2,221	2,158	2,669	2,982	2,273	2,196
Catholic		264	343	389	402			469
Lutheran		535	–	–	–			–
Reformed		26	–	–	–			–
Evangelical		–	631	842	806			2,162
Other								38

=== Town’s name ===
About the roots of the name Lauterecken, there has been disagreement among the locally based regional historians. The two sides can be roughly broken down as follows:

1. The town arose next to a valley castle between the Glan and the Lauter;
2. The town lay at the foot of a hill castle named Lautereck.

The former, which relates the name ending to the town's geographical location, has thus far been held to be the right one and it was even supported by earlier placename researchers and compilers of town descriptions (Widder, Pöhlmann, Christmann and nowadays Karl Pfleger). Quite recently, researcher Martin Dolch has had slight doubts about the name, noting that where the Glan meets the Lauter, it does not form an Ecke (the last element in the town's name, and also German for "corner"), that is to say, a wedge-shaped point of land (for a well known German example of one of these, see Deutsches Eck). Those who propound the latter theory point to the hill castles that bear names ending in —eck (Schlosseck, Sponeck, etc.). The name itself does not crop up in documents before the 14th century. Older names that the town has borne are iuxtra Luterecke (later edition of Prüm Abbey’s directory of holdings, the Prümer Urbar), die burge und dorffe zu Lutrecken (copy from 1343), in die borg zu Lutereckin oder in die stad dar vor (1350) and Luterecken burg vnd stat (1387, first mention in an original document). Neither of those theories, though, explains the origin of the prefix Lauter—; however, another source deals with that by saying that the town is named after the little river, the Lauter, which rises at the northern edge of the Palatinate Forest southeast of Kaiserslautern and flows 35 km down to Lauterecken, where its water – which according to the name was once lauter (meaning "clean", although the word is now obsolete in this sense) – flows into the Glan, coming down from Altenglan, near the middle of town. Here at these forks arose the town of Lauterecken, which was once called Lautereck.

=== Vanished villages ===
Within what are now Lauterecken's town limits once lay two villages named Bilstein and Nirthausen, and also an estate called the Liebfrauenhof. For a time, another estate called the Windhof (despite the name, not a wind farm) also belonged to Lauterecken. Bilstein first crops up in an original document from 1304, and is last mentioned in the mid 16th century, meaning that it might well have vanished even before the Thirty Years' War. The name is interpreted as having originally been "Bilo’s Estate". Nirthausen was first mentioned in an original document in 1377, and cropped up in another document in 1643. Its name is interpreted as "Nerito’s Estate". The Liebfrauenhof – whose name can be taken to mean "Estate of Our Lady" – appears in a document from 1583 as a landhold of the Offenbach Monastery. According to this record, at the time when the Reformation was introduced, the feudal lords put the estate into Erbbestand (a uniquely German landhold arrangement in which ownership rights and usage rights were separated; this is forbidden by law in modern Germany). The Windhof is actually not a vanished village at all. It now belongs to the neighbouring municipality of Grumbach.

== Religion ==
During the Middle Ages, the townsfolk belonged to the unified Catholic faith and long belonged to the Church of Medard. In the time of the Reformation, on orders from the Dukes of Zweibrücken and following the principle of cuius regio, eius religio, everyone in the town had to convert to Lutheran belief. When towards the end of the 16th century the Duchy converted to Reformed belief, Palatinate-Veldenz did not embrace this newer faith and kept its people with Lutheranism. Nevertheless, in the time of the occupation by French King Louis XIV's troops and in the time of Electoral Palatinate rule that followed, a strong reversion to Catholic belief set in. In 1690, there was once again a Catholic community. Soon, roughly one third of all the townsfolk belonged to the Catholic faith, and the other two thirds were Protestant. The Reformed faith according to John Calvin’s teachings never did play any important rôle, even before the 1818 Protestant Union, although they did for a while have a prayer house at their disposal. There were also only a few Jews in town. The ratio of Catholics to Protestants shifted in the wake of the Second World War markedly in the Protestants’ favour as ethnic Germans driven out of Germany's former eastern territories came to town looking for a new place to live. Adherents of Islam nowadays also live in town, and many inhabitants adhere to no religion at all. For a long time, near what is today the Stadtkirche ("Town Church"), once stood a forerunner building about which nothing is known for sure. It was replaced in 1725 by a Protestant church and until a Catholic church was built, it had to be shared by the denominations. This church was torn down in the latter half of the 19th century, and right nearby arose the current Evangelical church in 1865–1866. Work on a new Catholic church began in 1845 and it was ready for use by 1853.

== Politics ==
=== Town council ===
The council is made up of 16 council members, who were elected by proportional representation at the municipal election held on 9 June 2024, and the honorary mayor as chairman.

The municipal election held on 9 June 2024 yielded the following results:

Year	SPD	CDU	FDP	FWG	Total
2024	3	5	3	5	16 seats
2019	3	5	3	5	16 seats
2014	4	3	3	6	16 seats
2009	4	4	3	5	16 seats
2004	5	5	2	4	16 seats

"FWG" is a voters’ group.

=== Mayor ===
Lauterecken's mayor since 2019 is Isabel Steinhauer-Theis.

=== Coat of arms ===
The town's arms might be described thus: Argent a lion passant azure armed and langued gules upon a triangle reversed voided inside which a triangle voided, its angles conjoined with the sides of the other, both of the third.

The lion appearing in Lauterecken's current arms is drawn from arms once borne by the House of Wittelsbach.

Lauterecken has had other arms. The arms shown in the Coffee Hag albums about 1925 are sable a triangle reversed voided argent, that is, a black shield bearing only one charge, a silver, hollow triangle standing on one point. Very similar arms were apparently borne in 1841, but the triangle was gules (red).

=== Town partnerships ===
Lauterecken fosters partnerships with the following places:

- Sombernon, Côte-d'Or, France since 1974

There are regular school exchanges and citizen visits between Lauterecken and Sombernon, along with friendships between various clubs and families. The Sombernon Stone, placed on the Roseninsel (island), reminds everyone of this contribution to peace in Europe.

== Culture and sightseeing ==
=== Buildings ===
The following are listed buildings or sites in Rhineland-Palatinate’s Directory of Cultural Monuments:

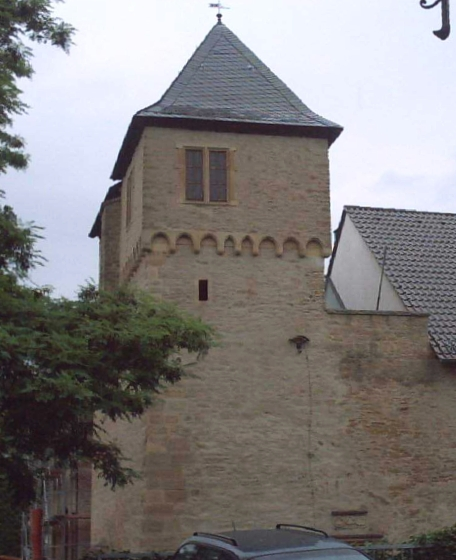
Veldenzturm

- Saint Francis Xavier Catholic Parish Church (Pfarrkirche St. Franziskus Xaverius), Hauptstraße 67 – sandstone-framed aisleless church, belltower with tent roof, Rundbogenstil, 1848–1853, architect Building Inspector Purreiner, Kaiserslautern
- Protestant parish church, Kirchgasse 6 – Gothic Revival aisleless church with crow-stepped gables, belltower, 1865/1866; characterizes square’s appearance
- Near Bahnhofstraße 1 – signal box; triaxial stone-block building, upper floor brick structure with iron framework; technical equipment
- Bahnhofstraße 16 – post office; plastered building with steep gabled roof, 1928, architects Heinrich Müller and König und Zellner, Speyer
- Near Bergstraße 1 – Blücher memorial, fountain with stele crowned with a lion, 1936
- Bergstraße 1 – former schoolhouse; three-floor stone-block building, 1836/1837, architect Johann Schmeisser, Kusel
- Hauptstraße 19 – former financial administration office; sandstone-framed stone-block building with hipped mansard roof, 1897/1898
- Hauptstraße 43 – Baroque building with mansard roof, 18th century; characterizes town’s appearance
- Hauptstraße 49 – Town Hall (Rathaus); Classicist building with hipped roof, 1829, architect Heinrich Ernst, Kaiserslautern, ridge turret 1837, fire station addition 1857/1858
- Rheingrafenstraße 1 – former Rheingrafenmühle ("Rhinegrave’s Mill"); building with half-hipped roof, before 1738, conversion marked 1808
- Rheingrafenstraße 10 – old railway station; hewn-stone-framed sandstone-block building, goods shed, 1890
- Schillerstraße – so-called Schillerbrücke over the Lauter; one-arch sandstone-block bridge, 1890
- Schloßgasse 1 – building with half-hipped roof, in the façade Renaissance spolia, about 1780
- Schulstraße 10 – former Amtsgericht; three-floor sandstone-framed building with hipped roof with staircase risalto, 1856/1857, extra floor 1899
- Schulstraße 14 – school; three-floor Baroque Revival sandstone-block building, 1901
- Schulstraße 29 – Protestant rectory; sophisticated cube-shaped building with tent roof, 1933, architect Leonhard Schork, Pirmasens
- Überlauterecker Straße – bridge over the Lauter; five-arch quarrystone bridge with flood dykes, before the middle of the 17th century
- Near Überlauterecker Straße 2 – cast-iron hand pump, latter half of the 19th century
- Near Überlauterecker Straße 34 – Saint Joseph's Chapel (St.-Josefs-Kapelle); Gothic Revival sandstone-block building, 1903, architect Joseph Walter, Lauterecken
- Veldenzplatz – warriors’ memorial 1866 and 1870/1871, sandstone, 1911/1912
- Veldenzplatz 1 – former Altes Schloss (castle) with Veldenzturm (tower); first mentioned in 1343, newly built in the earlier half of the 16th century, "Neuer Bau" expansion (Schloßgasse 1) from late 16th century; administration building and barn newly built 1803/1804; preserved: Late Gothic cellar, part of the ringwall, so-called Veldenzturm
- Chapel on Saarbrücker Straße – building with hipped roof, 1845
- Warriors’ memorial on the Igelskopf – sandstone-block tower with hall of honour, 1929, architects H. and F. Seeberger, Kaiserslautern

=== Culture ===
The town's cultural life was once borne by the school, and then later by the folk high school and the corresponding clubs. There is also a company for training and continuing training. In earlier centuries, Lauterecken was also said to be a publishing centre for various newspapers. There were the Boten für das Lauter- und Glantal with the enclosure Blätter für Geschichte und Heimatkunde für die Glan- und Lautergegend ("Pages for History and Local Studies for the Glan and Lauter Area"), founded in the 19th century and shut down in 1937, and the Nordwestpfälzische Zeitung ("Northwest Palatine Newspaper"; 1900-1938). The newspaper was taken over by the Allgemeine Zeitung, which still appears as a regional offshoot of a major newspaper in Meisenheim. A further widespread daily newspaper is the Rheinpfalz, Westricher Rundschau appearing in Ludwigshafen and Kusel.

=== Regular events ===
Major events on the town's calendar are the Spring Market (Frühjahrsmarkt) on the first weekend in May, the great Folk Festival (Heimatfest) on the second weekend in August, the Autumn Market (Herbstmarkt) on the second weekend in October, the Christmas Market (Weihnachtsmarkt) on the first weekend in December and the Tower Festival (Turmfest), although this last event is held only every other year. Any special old customs that may once have been observed in Lauterecken are now unknown.

=== Clubs ===
As of 2005, the following clubs are active in Lauterecken:

- Angelsportverein — angling club
- Blaskapelle 1972 — wind orchestra
- BSW Eisenbahner — BSW* railwaymen
- Café Kultur
- DRK-Tennisclub — German Red Cross tennis club
- Eisstockclub — ice stock club
- Evangelischer Frauenbund — league of Evangelical women
- Evangelischer Kirchenchor — Evangelical church choir
- Fanfarenzug — fanfare band
- Förderkreis der Jugendfeuerwehr — promotional "circle" for the youth fire brigade
- Förderverein der Janus-Korczak-Schule — promotional club for the Janusz Korczak School
- Förderverein des Gymnasiums — promotional club for the Gymnasium
- FWG Lauterecken — Free Voters’ Group
- Gesangverein — singing club
- Heimat- und Kulturverein — homeland and cultural club
- Hundeverein — dog club
- Katholische Frauengemeinschaft — Catholic women’s association
- Katholischer Kirchenchor — Catholic church choir
- Landfrauenverein — countrywomen’s club
- Musikverein — music club
- Pfälzerwaldverein — hiking club
- Reiterverein — riding club
- Sportfahrerkreis Glan-Lauter — motorsport club
- Sportverein — sport club
- Tauchsportverein — diving club

* BSW (Stiftung Bahn-Sozialwerk) is a social assistance agency run by railwaymen for railwaymen and their families.

== Economy and infrastructure ==
=== Economic structure ===
It goes without saying that in days of yore in this former residence town, not only was agriculture, along with winegrowing, well developed, but also service and handicraft businesses had set up shop, too. At first, the most important service was the mills. As early as 1387, a mill in "Inghelden" is recorded. It likely stood on the brook that empties into the Glan northeast of Lauterecken. The Stadtmühle ("Town Mill") on the Glan and the Rheingrafenmühle ("Rhinegrave’s Mill") on the Lauter had their first documentary mentions in the 16th century. Belonging for a while to the Town Mill, which shut down for good in 1966, was an oilmill. After the shutdown, a company that manufactured fruit juices called Schloss Veldenz located on the mill lands. The Rheingrafenmühle originally belonged to the Counts of Grumbach, who had been granted leave to use the more favourable water conditions in Lauterecken for a lordly mill. This mill ground its last in 1957. The wool weavers owned a walking mill on the Lauter, which was mentioned as early as 1542. In the time that followed arose a gristmill-oilmill, a sawmill and a bark mill, all of which makes it clear that weaving mills and tanneries also did business in town. Guild letters still exist from the wool and linen weavers, and also the tailors and cloth shearers, likewise from the 16th century. Several tanneries in Lauterecken are mentioned beginning in the 18th century, and certainly were in town some time before that. In the late 19th century, the Tressel tannery switched to making shoes, although no major shoe factory grew out of it. In Zweibrücken, documents mentioned a lordly brewery in the town and small schnapps distilleries, which obviously went out of business during French Revolutionary or Napoleonic times. Alongside the lordly brewery stood several small breweries and a small schnapps distillery, none of which could stand up to competition. A major brewery was the Felsenbrauerei, which was founded in 1860 and has since gone out of business. Since 2000, the railway station building has housed a small but very popular "inn brewery" (Gasthausbrauerei). In the 19th century, the sandstone industry earned major importance. Sandstone from Lauterecken were shipped for building magnificent buildings in big cities. Owing to shrinking demand, this industry was given up after the Second World War. Hard stone was quarried in the area known as Ingenhell beginning in the 19th century. For a time, more than 200 workers were employed there. On ropeway conveyors, the stone was brought to the dale. After 1970, the hard stone quarry was shut down. Building and removal businesses, which were to a great extent bound to the stone quarrying industry, are nevertheless still in business now. Besides sandstone and hard stone, limestone and coal were also mined within Lauterecken's limits in earlier times. Manufacturing operations of any great size only arose after the Second World War. In 1949, the Textilwerk Lauterecken sprang up between the Glan and Bundesstraße 420 as a branch plant of the Vogtland woollen mill in Hof an der Saale. Employed here for a time in three spinning mills and one cotton weaving mill were 1,500 workers. As a result of shrinking economic activity in the textile sector, the firm shut the Lauterecken branch plant down. After the building had long stood empty, it was taken over by the BITO (Bittmann GmbH Lagertechnik) logistics firm whose main location was in Meisenheim. A major factory that did various kinds of printing was the firm Lony, originally located in town near the former Lower Gate, later moving to the commercial-industrial development on Bundesstraße 420 going towards Medard, and later being taken over by a Swiss consortium. Likewise in business for a long time was a printing business called Giloi. Further businesses in the northeastern commercial-industrial development on Bundesstraße 420 were the Buhl leatherware factory (which made commercial articles) and the automotive-electric firm Hess/Gabel (Bosch-Dienst). Supermarkets have also located here.

=== Established businesses ===
Because of its central location in the northern part of the district, Lauterecken is home to three medium-size businesses and various shops. One business of national standing is the fruit juice producer Niehoffs-Vaihinger, a plant of the Cellpack Group (food packaging), which since 2003 has belonged to the industrial concern Behr Bircher Cellpack BBC (no relation to the British Broadcasting Corporation).

=== Energy ===
Part of the town's heating energy comes from an environmentally friendly high-performance heat pump from the firm in Freital named Thermea. It draws heat from the river Lauter, whose water has a yearly average temperature of 10 °C. Only in freezing temperatures does the alternative, a condensing boiler, spring into action.

=== Public institutions ===
Lauterecken is the seat of the like-named Verbandsgemeinde, and also hosts its administration. Moreover, a branch of the Bundesagentur für Arbeit is located here, one of three in the Kusel district. Lauterecken has a "Pro Seniore" home for the elderly, housing both those who can live independently and those in need of assistance or care. The town hall houses a small town library.

=== Education ===
The end of the Reformation also marked the beginning of schooling, conditioned as it was by the Protestant view that a Christian ought to be able to deal with God's Word in the Bible all by himself. Thus, school began in Lauterecken with the establishment of a Sunday school at which the faithful were to practise singing hymns and be quizzed in Catechism. Soon afterwards came the first attempts to establish schooling for all children. A schoolhouse stood near the Lower Gate. These early efforts to set up a system of education fell by the wayside in the course of the Thirty Years' War. Long after that war there were no such efforts, for the schoolhouse lay in ruins. Count Palatine Leopold Ludwig, though, was said to be a great promoter of education. After he had already decreed a school order in 1695 in Hanau-Lichtenberg, he did much the same for the town and Amt of Lauterecken, which in 1706 was laid down as the Lauterecker Schulordnung. A general school, independent of the Church, was introduced by the French in French Revolutionary times with their Primärschule. Only after the Congress of Vienna put Lauterecken in the Kingdom of Bavaria, though, did an ordinary school in the modern sense arise. At first it used classrooms set up at the church chaplain's house, although these were soon outgrown by the rising number of pupils. In 1836, therefore, building work began on a Protestant schoolhouse, where sometime after 1837 a schoolteacher and an assistant were soon teaching. The town bought a run-down house near the Protestant schoolhouse to convert it into a new schoolhouse that was to house the Catholic school, whose origins stretched back to French King Louis XIV's time. His troops long occupied Lauterecken. The town's efforts, though, brought about no permanent solution. As early as 1874, a communal school was established in Lauterecken, but the space provided for it proved unsatisfactory. Only in 1900 was work begun on a new schoolhouse that had room for all schoolchildren, and that also proved to be a model for the town with its architecture and location. After the Second World War, the arrangements changed. In the new building zone "Auf Röth", the state of Rhineland-Palatinate brought the Staatliches Gymnasium into service in 1969. The new building in the Stadtteil "Auf Röth", above Bundesstraße 420 going towards Wiesweiler, was built on a plot that was later to be expanded into a school centre. Under the regional new order, about 1970, there suddenly arose within a small area three Hauptschulen in Sankt Julian, Offenbach and Lauterecken, which bit by bit were drawn together. In Lauterecken, with steadily growing numbers of students and school centralization, additions kept having to be built to house new classrooms. Temporary wings appeared at the schoolhouse on Schulstraße. Only the lower Hauptschule classes were taught at first in Lauterecken in a new building. The upper classes were taught in the new school building in Offenbach-Hundheim. In 1996, a new school building was built at the school centre "Auf Röth" (this name is a prepositional expression, a common practice in Germany) for all Hauptschule students from the whole Verbandsgemeinde of Lauterecken. Since the 2001/2002 school year, this school has been offering all-day schooling. It is a vocationally oriented school where finishing the Tenth Class leads to the earning of the Mittlere Reife. At the old 1900 schoolhouse, the primary school can still be found, which has bit by bit also been assigned to teach pupils from nearby villages, too. In a sidebuilding, classes of the school for children with learning difficulties, the Janusz-Korczack-Schule, were at first taught. In 1999, all the special school’s classes could be moved into the now free, newer building, which had once housed a few Hauptschule classes. Lauterecken today has one primary school, one special school with a focus on learning (Janusz-Korczak-Schule), a school centre with a Realschule plus and the Veldenz-Gymnasium.

=== Transport ===
Lauterecken likely has its geographical location, where both the Lauter and the Grumbach empty into the Glan, making it favourable to transport, to thank for its founding. Nevertheless, it must be borne in mind that in bygone ages, road traffic tended to avoid the dales and instead run along over the heights. Roads, as the word is commonly understood today, did not come into being until the 19th century. The expansion of the Glan valley road (Glantalstraße) came about sometime about 1840, after the road through the Lauter valley towards Wolfstein and Kaiserslautern had been built a few years earlier. About 1850, the road into the Nahe valley by way of Grumbach was built, replacing an old road over the heights coming from Idar-Oberstein. Today, Lauterecken lies at the junction of Bundesstraßen 420 (Oppenheim—Neunkirchen, Saarland) and 270 (Idar-Oberstein—Kaiserslautern—Pirmasens). Distances to other places are as follows: Kusel 22 km, Meisenheim 6 km, Wolfstein 8 km, Kaiserslautern 32 km, Bad Kreuznach 42 km, Idar-Oberstein 31 km. Soon after the road network was expanded in the 19th century, Lauterecken was also linked to the railway network. In 1883, the Lauter Valley Railway (Lautertalbahn) came into service, as did the double-tracked Glan Valley Railway (Glantalbahn) through the Glan valley going towards Odernheim am Glan in 1894 and between 1902 and 1904 also the railway towards Altenglan. While the Lautertalbahn still runs regularly today, the Glan Valley Railway ceased operations about 1985. Nonetheless, it has since grown into a tourist attraction, for between Altenglan and Staudernheim, visitors can now ply the route themselves on a pedal-powered draisine. The Lauter Valley Railway links the town with the upper centre of Kaiserslautern. Lauterecken lies roughly at the halfway point between the two termini and has its own stop on this line. For cyclists, Lauterecken is a way station on the Glan-Blies cycle path.

== Famous people ==
=== Sons and daughters of the town ===
- Ursula von Pfalz-Veldenz-Lützelstein (b. 24 February 1572; d. 5 March 1635 Nürtingen), later Duchess Ursula of Württemberg
- Gustav Philipp von Pfalz-Veldenz (b. 17 July 1651; d. 18 August 1679 Lauterecken), hereditary prince of the County of Veldenz
- Elisabeth Johanna von Pfalz-Veldenz (b. 22 February 1653; d. 5 February 1718 Mörchingen), Countess Palatine of Veldenz
- Johann Carl Falciola (1759–1841), originally a theologian, then ardent follower of the French Revolution and admirer of Napoleon; largely defined town politics during the time of French rule; became well known for speculative businesses.
- Carl Theodor Barth (b. 2 October 1805; d. 19 November 1837 Liechtenstein), jurist and democratic journalist.
- Leopold Dippel (b. 4 August 1827; d. 4 March 1914 Darmstadt), botanist.
- Carl Christian Brenner (b. 1 August 1838; d. 22 July 1888 Louisville, Kentucky, USA), painter.
- Carl Friedrich Hildebrand (b. 1837; d. 1913 Kaiserslautern), docent at the Kaiserslautern teachers’ seminary, chairman of the Palatine Teachers’ Association.
- Karl Gebhart (b. 6 January 1859; d. 28 April 1921 Lauterecken), politician (DVP), countryman and economic adviser, on the board of the Landwirtschaftlicher Verein der Pfalz ("Agricultural Association of the Palatinate") and the Bund der Landwirte ("League of Countrymen"), lead writer for the magazine Pfälzer Bauer ("Palatine Farmer").
- Max Hartmann (b. 1876; d. 1962 Buchenbühl), natural scientist, professor of biology at the Kaiser Wilhelm Society and philosopher, recipient of the order Pour le Mérite (civil class) and the gold medal of the Palatine Society for the Advancement of the Sciences.
- Ludwig Steinhauer (b. 1885; d. 1957 Lauterecken), president of the Agricultural Chamber of the Palatinate, chairman of the Palatine Farmers’ and Winemakers’ Association, economic adviser and mayor in Lauterecken.
- Cläre Weitzel (b. 1889; d. 1945 Bad Dürkheim), writer, a Lauterecken tax collector's daughter (her father was transferred to Klingenmünster); she was later married to a schoolteacher; author of the novels Armer Hans (1919) and Heimat (1920), as well as many, some award-winning, narratives; died in an air raid.
- Emil Nesseler (b. 1891; d. 1952 Ludwigshafen), city archivist in Ludwigshafen, compiler of many writings relating to local history, foremost from the Ludwigshafen area.
- Alois Geiger (b. 1892; d. 1973 Kaiserslautern), president of the Handicraft Chamber of the Palatinate and holder of high positions in many offices of the Professional Union; recipient of the Commander's Cross of the Order of Merit of the Federal Republic of Germany.
- Walter Weizel (b. 1 August 1901; d. 6 August 1982), physicist and politician (SPD).
- Edwin Steinhauer (b. 1916; d. 1996 buried in Lauterecken), president of the Agricultural Chamber of Rhineland-Palatinate, member of the board of the Farmers’ and Winemakers’ Association of the Palatinate, Member of the Landtag, mayor in Lauterecken, decorated with many awards.
- Hans Otto Streuber (1949–), politician (SPD).
- Kurt Wallat (b. 24 April 1960), archaeologist.
- Uwe Hartenberger (b. 1 February 1968), footballer.
- Albert Young, boxer

=== Famous people associated with the town ===
- Philipp Oberheim (b. 1680 Wiesbaden, d. 1745 Lauterecken), clergyman in, among other places, Lauterecken and compiler of a songbook with a Catechism appendix.
- Friedrich Schüler (1791–1873), was in 1848/1849 member of the Frankfurt Parliament for Lauterecken.
- Jacob Theodor Gümbel (b. 1859 Landau, d. 1920 Landau), clergyman and deacon, among other places 1897–1910 in Lauterecken, compiler of books about church history, and also an important book about Palatinate-Veldenz.
- Bruno Eckhardt (b. 1960 Rockenhausen), Professor of Theoretical Physics at the University of Marburg, attended the Gymnasium in Lauterecken.
