= Glan (Nahe) =

River in Germany

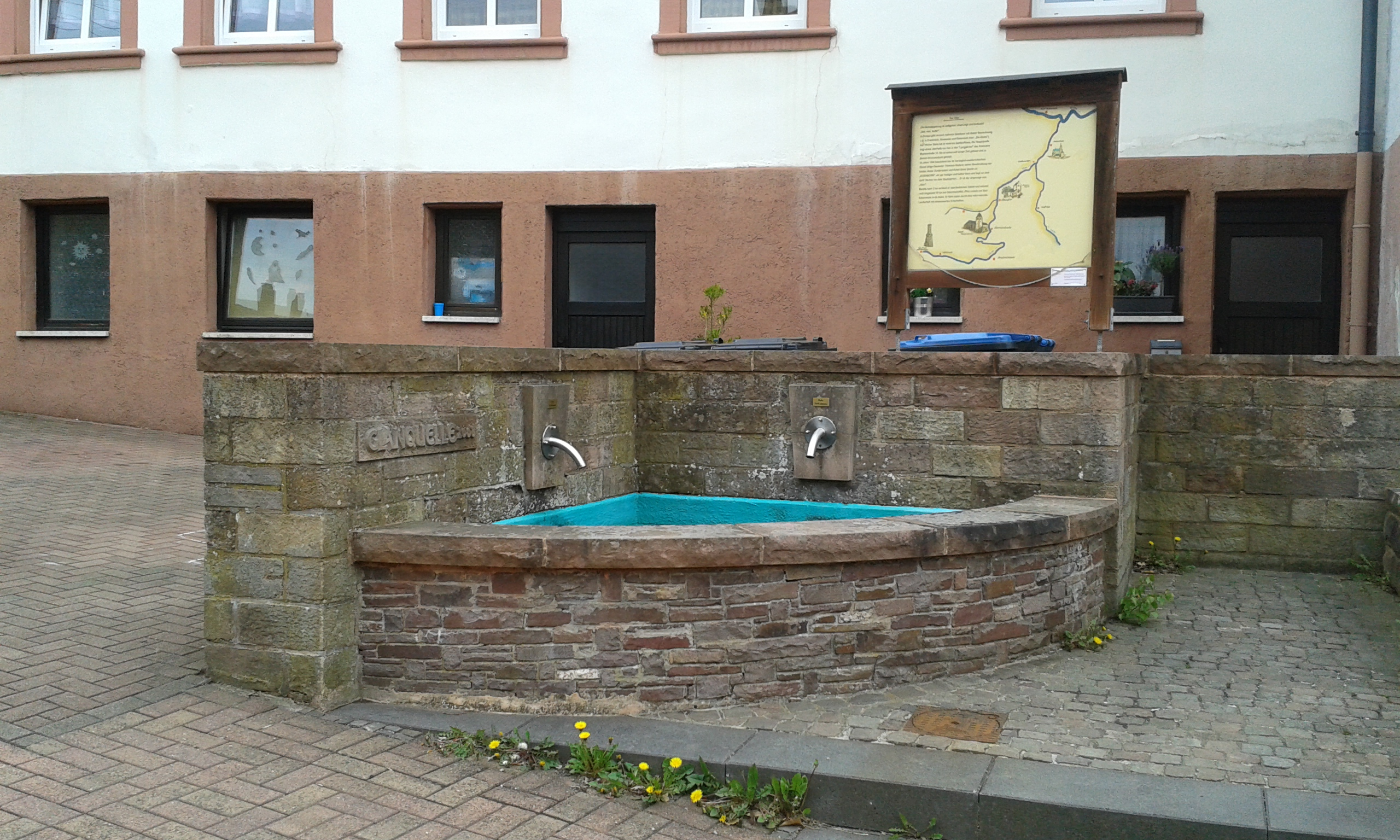
- The source of the Glan in Höchen

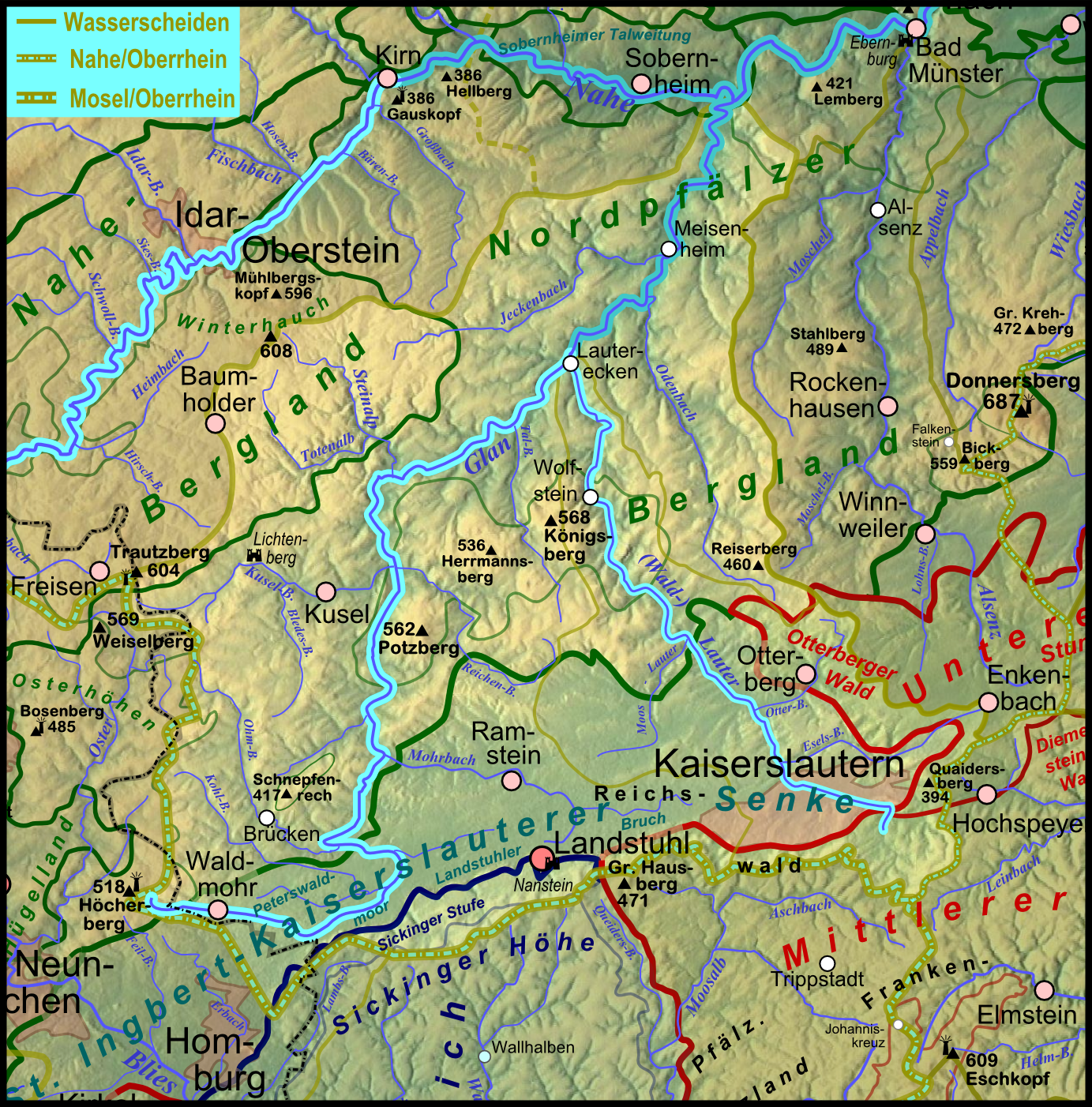
- Catchment and course

Location
- Country: Germany
- States: Saarland; Rhineland-Palatinate
- Reference no.: DE: 2546

Physical characteristics
- Source
  - location: in Höchen
  - coordinates: 49°23′29″N 7°16′33″E
  - elevation: ca. 480 m above sea level (NHN)
- Mouth
  - location: After flowing through Odernheim below Staudernheim from the right into the Nahe
  - coordinates: 49°46′34″N 7°42′52″E
  - elevation: ca. 131 m above sea level (NHN)
- Length: 89.67 km
- Basin size: 1,221.976 km²

Basin features
- Progression: Nahe → Rhine → North Sea
- River system: Rhine
- Landmarks: Small towns: Bexbach, Lauterecken, Meisenheim
- Tributaries
  - left: Kohlbach, Ohmbach, Kuselbach, Steinalp, Jeckenbach
  - right: Mohrbach, Reichenbach, Talbach, (Wald)-Lauter, Odenbach,
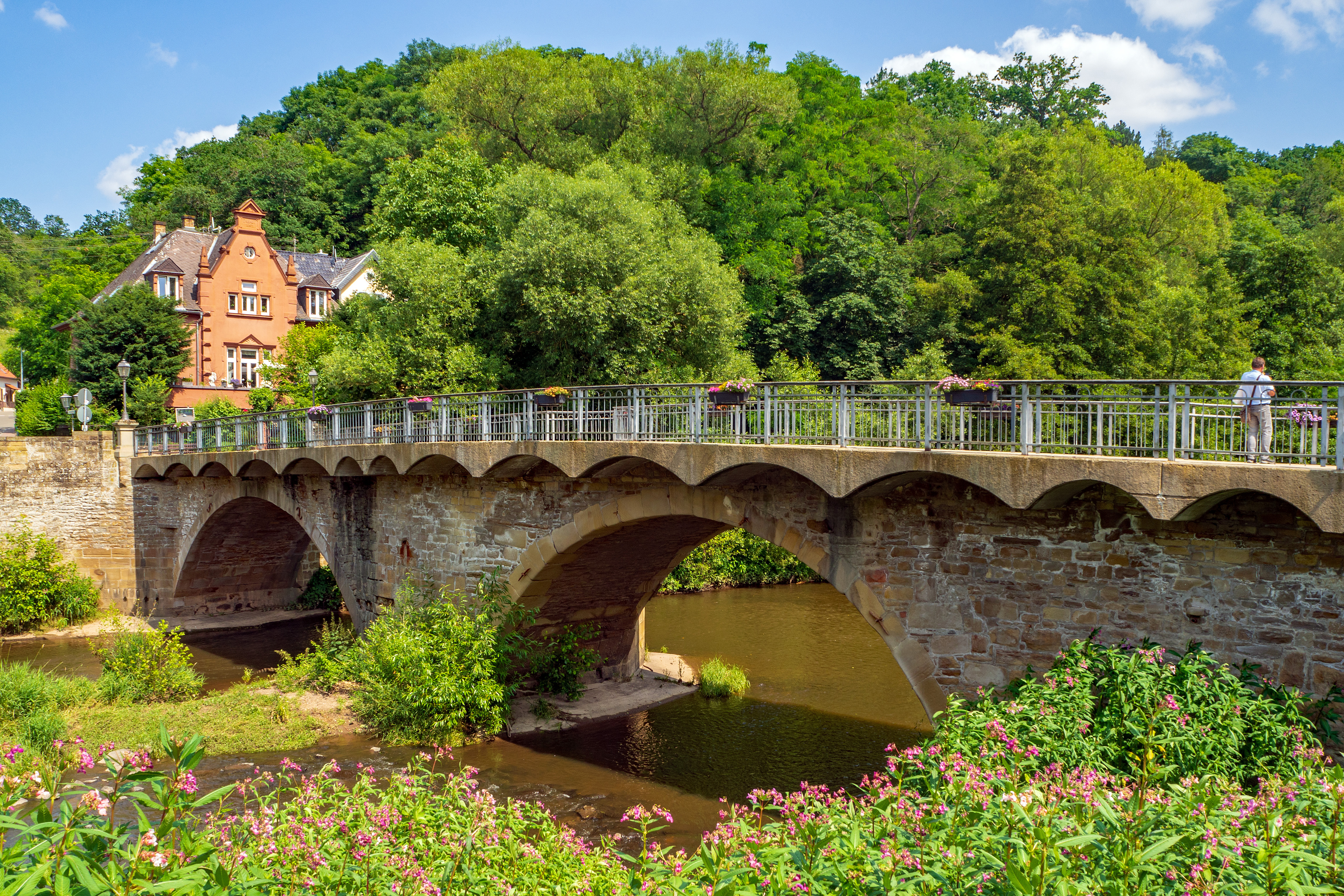
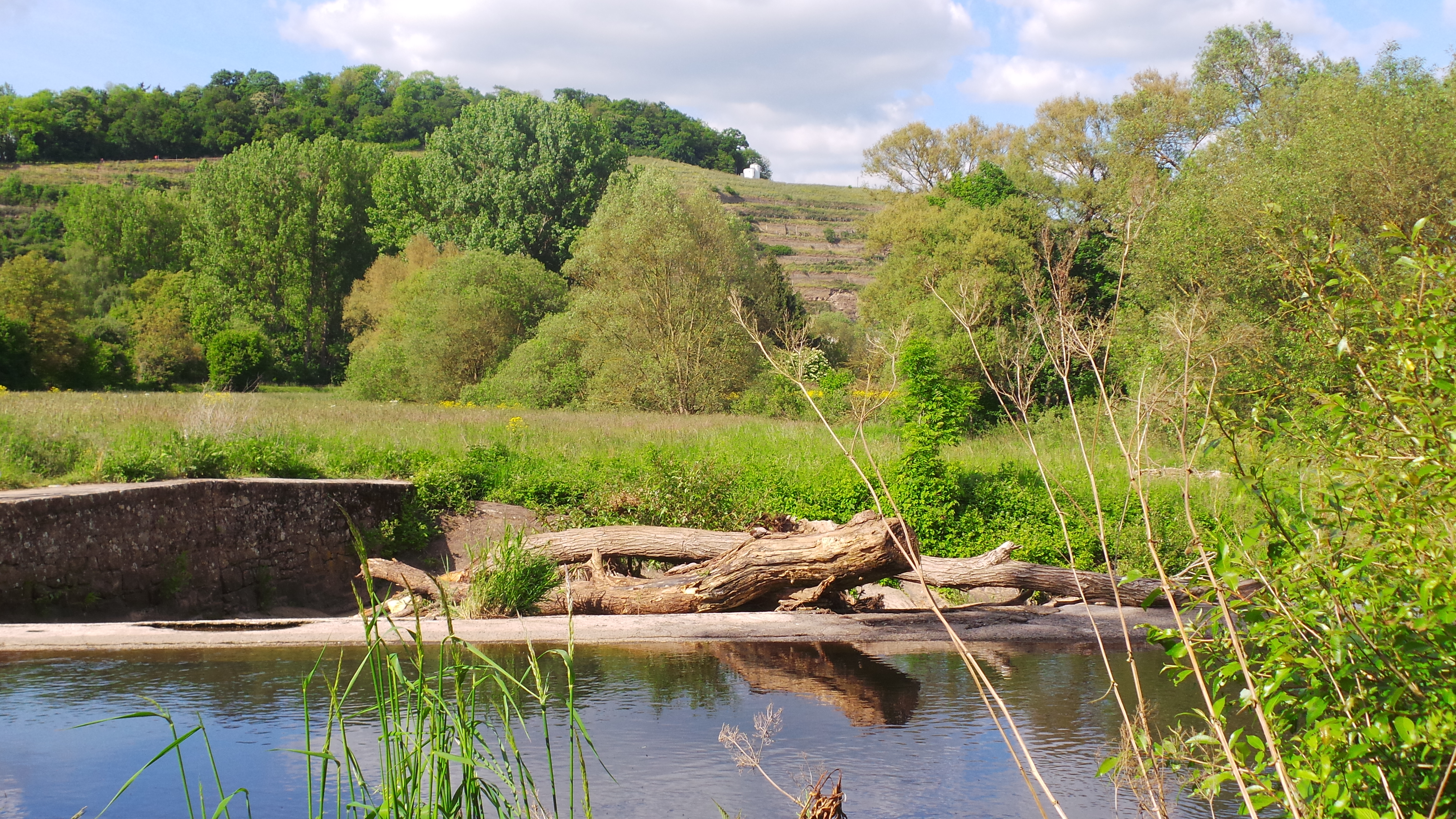
- Bridge over the Glan in Meisenheim Nature reserve near the confluence

The Glan (German pronunciation: [ɡlaːn]) is a river in southwestern Germany, right tributary of the Nahe. It is approximately 68 km (42 miles) long. It rises in the Saarland, northwest of Homburg. It flows generally north, through Rhineland-Palatinate, and empties into the Nahe near Odernheim am Glan, at Staudernheim, across the Nahe from Bad Sobernheim. Other towns along the Glan are Altenglan, Glan-Münchweiler, Lauterecken and Meisenheim.

== Etymology ==
The Celtic root of the name comes either from glann (shining) or from glen (U-shaped valley).

== See also ==
- List of rivers of Saarland
- List of rivers of Rhineland-Palatinate
