= Abtweiler =

- Municipality
- Coat of arms

- Location of Abtweiler within Bad Kreuznach district
- Interactive map of Abtweiler
- Location within Germany Location within Rhineland-Palatinate
- Coordinates: 49°44′43″N 07°39′29″E
- Country: Germany
- State: Rhineland-Palatinate
- District: Bad Kreuznach
- Municipal assoc.: Nahe-Glan

Government
  - Mayor (2019–24): Peter Michel

Area
  - Total: 5.76 km^{2} (2.22 sq mi)
- Elevation: 226 m (741 ft)

Population (2025-12-31)
  - Total: 192
  - Density: 33.3/km^{2} (86.3/sq mi)
- Time zone: UTC+01:00 (CET)
  - Summer (DST): UTC+02:00 (CEST)
- Postal codes: 55568
- Dialling codes: 06753
- Vehicle registration: KH
- Website: www.abtweiler.de

Abtweiler is an Ortsgemeinde – a municipality belonging to a Verbandsgemeinde, a kind of collective municipality – in the Bad Kreuznach district in Rhineland-Palatinate, Germany. It belongs to the Verbandsgemeinde Nahe-Glan.

== Geography ==
=== Location ===
Abtweiler lies in the Naheland, a small part of the North Palatine Uplands between the rivers Nahe and Glan up a side valley of the Glan. It is a linear village (by some definitions, a “thorpe”) in the south of the district, and lies on the left side of the lower Glan valley. It lies between Meisenheim and Bad Sobernheim. The countryside is mainly characterized by cropfields and woodland, along with some meadow orchards.

=== Land use ===
As at 31 December 2012, the various uses of Abtweiler's 5.76 km² of land broke down thus:

Use	%
Agriculture	70.8
Woodland	23.1
Open water	0.1
Built-up/Transport	6.0
Other	0

=== Neighbouring municipalities ===
Abtweiler borders in the north on the town of Bad Sobernheim on the river Nahe, in the east on the municipality of Rehborn, in the south on the municipality of Raumbach and in the west on the municipality of Lauschied.

=== Constituent communities ===
Also belonging to Abtweiler are the outlying homesteads of Hühnerhof (also called “Hienerhof” or “Hingelshof”) and Sankt Antoniushof (also called “Danteshof”).

=== Geology ===
==== Pennsylvanian and Rotliegend in the Saar–Nahe Basin ====
As one of the biggest intermontane Late Variscan basins, the Saar–Nahe Basin formed in the transitional time between Namurian and Westphalian in the Pennsylvanian subperiod roughly 317,000,000 years ago. What lies at the surface of it today comprises an area of only some 100 by 40 kilometres. Indeed, the basin itself is actually only part of a much greater formation, in broad areas overlain with newer deposits, called the Lorraine-Saar-Nahe-Hesse Trough. In Rhineland-Palatinate, outcrops of Permian-Carboniferous rock can be found in the northern Palatinate and the Nahe Uplands (where Abtweiler lies), stretching over to the Bingen-Alzey area. In its central area, the basin has thick Permian-Carboniferous sedimentary and volcanic rock (thus igneous) deposits up to 8 km thick, of which roughly 4.5 km comes from the Pennsylvanian and more than 3 km comes from the Rotliegend.

==== Developmental phases ====
In the early time of its active development, from the Pennsylvanian on into the Lower Rotliegend (Glan Subgroup, Meisenheim Formation), fluviolacustrine sedimentation conditions prevailed in the Saar–Nahe Basin. The basin lay, according to palaeomagnetic investigation, just north of the equator in the tropics at this time, so that under warm and moist climatic conditions, the lacustrine deposits especially, with their heavy amounts of organic remnants, ended up forming many coal seams, especially in the Pennsylvanian. Towards the end of the Rotliegend (Disibodenberg Formation), the extensive, at times basinwide lakes were filled in by advancing deltas, and by the end of the Glan Subgroup (beginning with the Oberkirchen Formation), the predominant deposit conditions were fluvial in what were now dry-warm climatic conditions. Along with its attendant, sometimes heavy, intrusive and effusive-extrusive magmatism – involving lavas and tuffs being pushed up, their place taken by both acidic and basic intrusions – it lasted until the middle of the Nahe Subgroup, when it came to an end with the quartzite conglomerate deposition found in the Wadern Formation. Preserved today from the last phase of the Permian-Carboniferous sedimentation in the Saar–Nahe Basin are the Standenbühl Formation's alluvial-fan and dry-lake (playa) sediments, represented by the Kreuznach Formation's fluvial-aeolian sandstones found regionally on the basin's northwest edge near Bad Kreuznach.

==== The Glan Subgroup – the characteristic deposition phase around Abtweiler ====
The Glan Subgroup comprises a period in the Saar–Nahe Basin’s developmental history characterized by a manifold shift back and forth between fluvial and lacustrine deposition conditions. Lithostratigraphically dividing this time’s geological deposits, which are several thousand metres deep in this continental basin, is often problematic. Particular difficulties arise with the ordering of the minerals in the so-called “edge facies” on the basin's northwest edge. The deposits around Abtweiler are mainly grouped into this time. They comprise mainly the Jeckenbach Subformation, the Odernheim Subformation, the Disibodenberg Formation, the Oberkirchen Formation and the Thallichtenberg Formation, along with deposits in the dales of Quaternary origin.

==== The Jeckenbach Subformation ====
The Jeckenbach Subformation's deposits (mainly silty minerals), part of the Meisenheim Formation, which in turn belongs to the Glan Subgroup, are found mainly south of Abtweiler (around Castle Raumberg). This great subformation's lithostratigraphical division is based on several almost basinwide sandstone and lake sediment horizons. To be named here are the Meisenheim Bed, the Breitenheim Bed and the Jeckenbach Bed as well as the Hoof seams. Atzbach (1980) puts the thickness in this type region near Jeckenbach west of Meisenheim at 600 m.

==== The Odernheim Subformation ====
In the Odernheim Subformation, too – the uppermost section of the Meisenheim Formation – silty minerals predominate. Those deposits are found mainly south of Abtweiler, near the village's outskirts. The subformation begins with a moderately to coarsely sandy, and in many places detritus-bearing, horizon, Bed R-5. It is capped off by the dark mudstones in the Humberg Bed. Meyer and Schnabel (1988) put the Odernheim am Glan type region's thickness at 155 m. The subformation contains several indicative horizons that are important for lithostratigraphic classification in wide areas of the Saar–Nahe Basin. Foremost among these are fluvial-deltaic, coarsely clastic horizons as well as lacustrine deposits with dark mudstones. To be named here are the Rehborn, Odernheim, Kappeln and Humberg Beds, layered into which are many, mostly thin limestone and cinder tuff horizons.

==== The Disibodenberg Formation ====
The Disibodenberg Formation's deposits are found mainly east and west of Abtweiler. They furthermore form the Sankt Antoniushof's geological foundation. During the time of the Disibodenberg Formation, named after the old Disibodenberg Monastery on the Nahe north of Odernheim am Glan, the long relatively uniform sedimentation conditions in the Saar–Nahe Basin now changed. Vast, deep lakes no longer existed. Now prevalent was a fluvial-limnic or deltaic environment. Consequently, the more than 200-metre-thick entity was made up mostly of an alternating sequence of grey siltstones and fine sandstones. Also still cropping up, albeit seldom, were dark mudstone inclusions from local lakes. Within the Disibodenberg Formation, no cross-regionally meaningful indicative lithostratigraphic horizons can be identified. The formation's bottom limit is defined as the Humberg Bed's upper limit. The formation ends on the base of the first, red, conglomeratic layer, which itself is grouped with the later Oberkirchen Formation.

==== The Oberkirchen Formation ====
The Oberkirchen Formation's sediments are markedly distinguished from the strata both above and below them. They can be found north and northwest of Abtweiler, towards the Hühnerhof. Prevailing here are beds of red to grey-red, coarsely sandy to conglomeratic arkoses up to several metres thick. Interstratified therein are horizons of reddish fine sandstone and to some extent also grey siltstones and claystones. These fine-grained horizons are mostly only thinly developed. The arkoses, which exist as detritus (particularly vein quartz, quartzite, lydite, metamorphic rocks and volcanic rocks) as well as bits more than a centimetre across, almost always containing weathered feldspars, are deposits in channels of a many-branched river system that flowed across the Saar–Nahe Basin from southwest to northeast. The fine-grained sediments mainly represent floodplain and horseshoe lake deposits. The Oberkirchen Formation, named after an outlying centre of the municipality of Freisen in the Saarland, contains minerals that are exposed in the Saar–Nahe Basin on both sides of the Palatine Saddle from southwest to northeast.

==== The Thallichtenberg Formation ====
The facies and distribution of the Thallichtenberg Formation, named after Thallichtenberg, were investigated by Konrad in 1969 on the Palatine Saddle's southeast flank. The deposits, mainly made up of grey and red fine-grained sediments (fine sandstone, claystones and siltstones) from a fluvial floodplain environment of the Thallichtenberg Formation, can be found north and northwest of Abtweiler, towards the Hühnerhof. Cropping up locally are lacustrine deposits, some with biogenic limestone horizons, and coarse, fluvial layers. While thicknesses of up to 260 m are reached in the basin's southwest, this entity to the northeast is very much thinner.

==== The Nahe Subgroup ====
The onset of volcanism within the basin, the beginning of the volcanic synrift phase, was also the foundation of the Nahe Subgroup. At the same time, under semiarid conditions, fluvial-alluvial sedimentation conditions were dominant in the Saar–Nahe Basin which, according to Stollhofen (1991), was brought about by a marked drop in the rate of subsidence. The minerals deposited in this phase of the basin's development are grouped into the Donnersberg Formation, whereas all the Nahe Subgroup's subsequent formations are assigned to the basin's post-rift phase. It was mainly thermal subsidence and sediment compaction that took place. The area of sedimentation sometimes reaches beyond the bounds of the active basin edges. The Donnersberg Formation's deposits are the Freisen layers (red, light grey and detritus-bearing arkoses and sandstones, as well as red-purple to green claystones with sporadic tuff inclusions) present south of the Hühnerhof and the andesites found under the Hühnerhof itself (Nappe II – gabbroporphyritic partly with very big inclusions of plagioclase, clinopyroxenes and viridescent olivines in partly intersertally, partly intergranularly structured ground masses).

== History ==
=== Abtweiler in the 12th century ===
In 1128, Abtweiler had its first documentary mention as Abwilre- in pago Nachgowe (Nahegau) in a document from Mainz for the monastery at the Disibodenberg. According to this, Archbishop of Mainz Ruthard (1089-1109) had donated to the monks an estate in Hene (now the outlying centre of Hühnerhof) and four Morgen of vineyards, which were rented. The other outlying centre, the Sankt Antoniushof, had already had its first documentary mention, in 1107.

=== Abtweiler in the 14th century ===
A record from 1333 stating that the Hühnerhof in Hene had to make a contribution to the building of a chapel in Apwilre. Also, the forest then belonged jointly to the villages of Abtweiler and Staudernheim. Thus, at this time, Abtweiler had its own chapel, which belonged to the greater parish on the Disibodenberg. The Late Gothic building that still stands today dates from the 15th century. In 1338, the people from Apwilre had to deliver wood to build a bridge across the Nahe near Staudernheim. Another record from 1342 tells the reader that “Hegene und Apwilre” were parochially united with Saint Nicholas’s Parish Church (Pfarrkirche St. Nikolaus) “auf dem Berge” (“on the mountain”, that is to say, the Disibodenberg).

=== Abtweiler in the 15th to 18th centuries ===
After the Reformation, in 1560, authority over the church passed with the dissolution of the monastery on the Disibodenberg to Wolfgang, Count Palatine of Zweibrücken. Abtweiler, however, remained a branch of Odernheim am Glan until at least 1575. Then, sometime between 1604 and 1612, it was bound with the parish of Boos. After 1585, there was a self-administering Lutheran parish in Abtweiler. In 1772, there were 20 families living in the village. They worked 444 Morgen of cropland and paid 561 Rhenish guilders in rent and other levies. After the House of Steinkallenfels died out in 1778, its share of the lordship went to the Lords of Hunolstein. This local lordship was swept away with the advance of French Revolutionary troops into the region.

=== Abtweiler after the 18th century ===
After 1815, the church community was parochially united with Staudernheim. From 1815 to 1866, the village belonged to the Oberamt of Meisenheim in the Landgraviate of Hesse-Homburg, with which it passed to Prussia in 1866.

=== Hühnerhof ===
Archbishop of Mainz Ruthard (1089-1109) donated to the monks an estate in Hene (now the outlying centre of Hühnerhof) and four Morgen of vineyards, which were rented. By 1426, the Rhinegraves had granted the now forsaken village of Hene to Wilhelm of Kallenfels, who in turn gave it to the knight Sir Friedrich of Löwenstein. In 1507, it was an hereditary fief bequeathed to his issue, Johann of Löwenstein. In 1659, the place passed back to the Waldgraves and Rhinegraves of Dhaun, but as soon afterwards as 1662, it was once again a fief. A Weistum (cognate with English wisdom, this was a legal pronouncement issued by men learned in law in the Middle Ages and early modern times) from 1576 laid out the village's limits with the Hühnerhof, which itself later belonged to Palatinate-Simmern.

=== Sankt Antoniushof ===
The “Danteshof”, as it is also called (but in either case, a definite article is used with the name, as also for the Hühnerhof), was in the Middle Ages a village with a chapel and a court of Schöffen (roughly “lay jurists”), led by a Schultheiß. It was among the oldest settlements in the Nahe-Glan area, presumably having arisen soon after the Franks took over the land on the fertile soils of the extensive mountain heath. The impetus for the founding of this hamlet – the 1107 document mentioned above did describe it as such, using the German word Weiler – without a doubt came from the nearby Disibodenberg Benedictine Monastery, the great missionary hub and stronghold of the ecclesiastical cultural pioneers in the Nahegau. Important for and full of information about the Sankt Antoniushof's history is the 1375 Schönenberg Weistum, which is recorded in the Disibodenberg Cartulary, now kept in Darmstadt. Twenty years later, records were speaking of an estate called Anthisberg. In 1659, the Anthesberg got, in the person of Henrich Schappert, an hereditary tenant. Schappert – his wife's name was Magdalene – was the forefather of the family Schappert, whose current members still live at the “Danteshof” even today. In 1959, the Schapperts marked the 300th anniversary of their rise to prominence and their arrival at the Sankt Antoniushof, which occasioned a festival.

=== Population development ===
Abtweiler's population figures have not shown much growth since Napoleonic times, and indeed, since the middle of the 20th century, they have been shrinking. The figures in the table from 1871 to 1987 are based on censuses:

Year	Inhabitants
1815	226
1835	NA
1871	371
1905	361
1939	368

Year	Inhabitants
1950	368
1961	319
1970	315
1987	260
2005	243

== Religion ==
Abtweiler's church had its first documentary mention in the 14th century. According to the 1333 agreement, the income from the forest, which was shared half and half by Staudernheim and Hene (Hühnerhof), was to be used to build the chapel in Appwilre. In 1342, this chapel was named as belonging under Blessed Nicholas’s Parish Church (Pfarrkirche “Beati Nycolai”) on the Disibodenberg. Going by the building’s form, however, the church that stands today can only be dated as far back as the 15th century, since the quire and the nave are mentioned one after the other after a short interruption. After the Reformation, the church belonged as a branch to Odernheim, and in 1604 – possibly after the village passed to the House of Steinkallenfels – to Boos. Later, Abtweiler was temporarily a parish in its own right, but was now and then served together with Odernheim, Lauschied and Staudernheim, with which it was united in 1815, an arrangement that has not changed. The right to appoint the parish priest was held until 1560 by the Disibodenberg Monastery, and thereafter by the Dukes of Palatinate-Zweibrücken. As at 31 August 2013, there are 211 fulltime residents in Abtweiler, and of those, 141 are Evangelical (66.825%), 40 are Catholic (18.957%), 1 is Lutheran (0.474%), 1 (0.474%) belongs to another religious group and 28 (13.27%) either have no religion or will not reveal their religious affiliation.

== Politics ==
=== Municipal council ===
The council is made up of 6 council members, who were elected by majority vote at the municipal election held on 7 June 2009, and the honorary mayor as chairman.

=== Mayor ===
Abtweiler’s mayor is Peter Michel.

=== Coat of arms ===
The German blazon reads: Durch rot und silber geschachtete Balken schräggeteilt, oben in schwarz ein goldenes Patriarchenkreuz, unten in grün ein herschauender, rot gezungter, silberner Löwenkopf.

The municipality’s arms might in English heraldic language be described thus: A bend countercompony argent and gules between in chief sable a cross patriarchal Or and in base vert a lion’s head erased affronty of the first langued of the second.

The parish and village of Abtweiler belonged to the Disibodenberg Monastery, which was founded in 1108 by the Benedictines, representing whom is the charge on the sinister (armsbearer’s left, viewer’s right) side in chief (high up), the patriarchal cross. In 1259, the Benedictines were relieved of their monastery by the Cistercians, whose device is the bend (slanted stripe) with the countercompony (two-row chequered) pattern. In the 17th and 18th centuries, the village of Abtweiler belonged to the Barons (Freiherren) of and at Stein-Kallenfels. Their tombs are preserved in the church quire at Abtweiler. The lion’s head on the dexter (armsbearer’s right, viewer’s left) side in base is drawn from an heraldic device that they bore.

== Culture and sightseeing ==
=== Buildings ===
The following are listed buildings or sites in Rhineland-Palatinate’s Directory of Cultural Monuments:

- Hauptstraße 12 – Evangelical parish church; Late Gothic aisleless church, 15th century; vestry addition marked 1756 (see also below)
- Im Tal 1 – three-sided estate, quarrystone buildings, house marked 1874
- Im Tal 5 – former school with teacher’s dwelling; two-winged building with half-hipped roof, Heimatstil, about 1910
- Turmweg 3/5 – two-part house with stable underneath, partly timber-frame, early or mid 19th century

=== Church ===
An attraction in the village is the Late Gothic church, built in the 15th century. Besides two important 15th-century wall paintings, there is also a ceiling painting in the quire. Also to be seen are six tombs of the baronial Family Steinkallenfels from the 17th and 18th centuries. The church itself has had an important and eventful history, which is detailed above under Religion. From weekly church services to weddings, christenings, Confirmations and burials, the church still plays a great role in the village’s everyday life.

==== Bells ====
The Abtweiler church has a peal of three bells. The oldest one was poured in 1700 by an unknown bellfounder, and indeed, it bears no inscription. It is made of iron. The other two are much more recent, having been poured in 1924 by the Bochumer Verein (actually a mining and steelworking company in Bochum, despite the usual meaning of the German word Verein – “club”). These are made of steel. One of these two bells bears the inscription “Den Menschen zum Segen” (“To the people as a blessing”), while the other bears the inscription “Gott zum Segen” (“To God as a blessing”).

==== Organ ====
The church’s organ was built by the Brothers Stumm, whose business headquarters were in Rhaunen-Sulzbach. The organ itself was built in 1857, although its current outward appearance is the result of work done in the 1960s. It was also renovated between 1988 and 1998. The organ’s stops are described as “wooden principal 8, salicional, mixture threefold, gedackt, octave, perfect fifth and flute.

=== Clubs ===
The following clubs are active in Abtweiler:

- Flötenkreis Abtweiler — flute club
- Förderer der Freiwilligen Feuerwehr Abtweiler — volunteer fire brigade promotional association
- Kulturverein Abtweiler — culture club
- Landfrauen Abtweiler e.V. — countrywomen’s club
- MGV 1872 Gemischter Chor Abtweiler / Raumbach e.V. — mixed choir

== Economy and infrastructure ==
=== Mineral exploitation ===
The Permian-Carboniferous deposits described above under Geology have of course been important to mankind and its industry in the past, and still are now. In the Palatinate, mining has a long tradition, and there is evidence that in a few areas, it even stretches back to Celtic times. The most varied of mineral wealth has been brought to light in this region. They are products of volcanic activity, deposits from rivers and lakes, and even the sea (for the Saar–Nahe Basin has not always been on land), which once covered much of the Palatinate. Hundreds of locations of former mining operations are known today. Countless galleries, shafts, open pits, tailing heaps, prospecting diggings, building ruins and even smelter ruins bear witness to the almost two-thousand-year quest for mineral wealth.

=== Transport ===
Running to Abtweiler's south is Bundesstraße 420. Serving Staudernheim is a railway station on the Nahe Valley Railway (Bingen–Saarbrücken).
