= Rehborn =

- Municipality
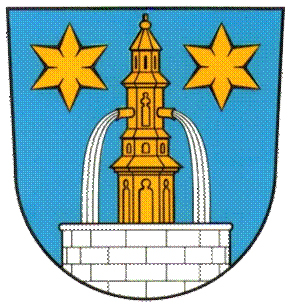
- Coat of arms

- Location of Rehborn within Bad Kreuznach district
- Interactive map of Rehborn
- Location within Germany Location within Rhineland-Palatinate
- Coordinates: 49°44′02″N 7°41′17″E
- Country: Germany
- State: Rhineland-Palatinate
- District: Bad Kreuznach
- Municipal assoc.: Nahe-Glan

Government
  - Mayor (2019–24): Karl-Otto Dornbusch

Area
  - Total: 10.14 km^{2} (3.92 sq mi)
- Elevation: 150 m (490 ft)

Population (2025-12-31)
  - Total: 689
  - Density: 67.9/km^{2} (176/sq mi)
- Time zone: UTC+01:00 (CET)
  - Summer (DST): UTC+02:00 (CEST)
- Postal codes: 55592
- Dialling codes: 06753
- Vehicle registration: KH
- Website: www.gemeinde-rehborn.de

Rehborn is an Ortsgemeinde – a municipality belonging to a Verbandsgemeinde, a kind of collective municipality – in the Bad Kreuznach district in Rhineland-Palatinate, Germany. It belongs to the Verbandsgemeinde of Nahe-Glan.

== Geography ==
=== Location ===
Rehborn lies on the Glan between Meisenheim to the south and Odernheim am Glan to the north. The municipal area measures 1,014 ha (3.92 mi^{2}).

=== Neighbouring municipalities ===
Clockwise from the north, Rehborn's neighbours are the municipalities of Odernheim am Glan, Lettweiler, Unkenbach and Callbach, the town of Meisenheim and the municipalities of Raumbach and Abtweiler, all of which likewise lie within the Bad Kreuznach district but for Unkenbach, which lies in the neighbouring Donnersbergkreis.

=== Constituent communities ===
Also belonging to Rehborn are the outlying homesteads of Bahnposten 3061, Neuhaus and Schreckhof.

=== Palaeontology ===
Unearthed at a few vineyards in Rehborn have been plant and animal fossils from Rotliegend times in the Permian, some 290,000,000 years ago. Among the animal fossils that have been found are fishes, amphibians and reptiles.

== History ==
In the early 7th century, a new, small settlement began to grow between the Frankish centres of Odernheim and Meisenheim, Rehborn. In 1128, it had its first documentary mention as Robura. Archbishop Adalbert of Mainz (d. 1137) acknowledged to Disibodenberg Abbey those rights that it had already held in his predecessor Willigis's time (975–1011). The village's original name Robura comes from the Old High German ror, meaning "reed" and bur, meaning "house" (the latter word was cognate with the English word "bower"). This "house at the reeds" stood on the lands that are now Karl Neumann's, Erhard Wendel's and Karl Kerch's properties. Rural cadastral names still bear witness to it: "Brühl" (wet meadowland right near the manor house); "Hinner de Hufstatt" (or in standard German, "Hinter der Hofstätte" – gardens from the Brühl down to the Hüttenbach). Even though the village's name has nothing to do with either a spring (Brunnen in German or, less commonly, Born, but in either case cognate with the English word "bourne") or a roe deer (Reh in German, cognate with the English word "roe"), the mutation of the latter syllable into —born in speech had become the norm by the mid 16th century. The municipality's civic coat of arms even bears a village fountain as a charge (Brunnen can also mean "fountain"). Rehborn, over the course of its 1,400-year history, found itself under all kinds of lordships: the Archbishops of Mainz, Disibodenberg Abbey, its own lower nobility (shown in records from 1179 to 1373), the Counts of Veldenz, the Counts Palatine of Zweibrücken, the Revolutionary and, shortly thereafter, Napoleonic French (it lay in the Department of Mont-Tonnerre – or Donnersberg in German – from 1797 to 1814) and the Kingdom of Bavaria (later Free State of Bavaria after the Kaiser was overthrown late in the First World War, 1816 to 1945). Rehborn was assigned to Bavaria under the terms of the Congress of Vienna and belonged to the Rheinkreis, a Bavarian exclave in the Palatinate. Out of part of the French zone of occupation after the Second World War arose the new state of Rhineland-Palatinate in 1947. Today, Rehborn, with just under 800 inhabitants, is the third biggest place in the Verbandsgemeinde of Meisenheim. In the course of administrative restructuring in Rhineland-Palatinate, Rehborn was transferred out of the old Rockenhausen district, which was dissolved, to the Bad Kreuznach district. Ecclesiastically, Rehborn belongs, as it long has, to the Evangelical Church of the Palatinate and the Roman Catholic Diocese of Speyer.

=== Population development ===
Rehborn's population development since Napoleonic times is shown in the table below. The figures for the years from 1871 to 1987 are drawn from census data:

Year	Inhabitants
1815	566
1835	935
1871	1,115
1905	494
1939	802

Year	Inhabitants
1950	879
1961	811
1970	795
1987	782
2005	775

== Religion ==
As at 2 January 2014, there are 723 full-time residents in Rehborn, and of those, 554 are Evangelical (76.625%), 90 are Catholic (12.448%), 1 is Russian Orthodox (0.138%), 3 (0.415%) belong to other religious groups and 75 (10.373%) either have no religion or will not reveal their religious affiliation.

== Politics ==
=== Municipal council ===
The council is made up of 12 council members, who were elected by proportional representation at the municipal election held on 7 June 2009, and the honorary mayor as chairman. The municipal election held on 7 June 2009 yielded the following results:

Year	SPD	CDU	WGR	Total
2009	5	3	4	12 seats
2004	5	3	4	12 seats

=== Mayor ===
Rehborn's mayor is Karl-Otto Dornbusch, elected in 2019. His predecessor was Thomas Link, who had been mayor since 2 July 2009.

=== Coat of arms ===
The municipality's arms might be described thus: Azure issuant from base a basin argent masoned sable standing in which a village fountain Or with two streams of water, in chief two mullets of the fourth.

The main charge in the arms, a fountain, is canting for the placename ending —born, which can mean "fountain" or "spring" in German. In fact, the name's etymology has nothing to do with any kind of water source.

== Culture and sightseeing ==
=== Buildings ===
The following are listed buildings or sites in Rhineland-Palatinate's Directory of Cultural Monuments:

- Village core, Hauptstraße 16, 32, 36, 40, 45, 47, Obergasse 2, Untergasse 1, Obergasse 1 (monumental zone) – picturesquely laid-out square at intersection of most important village streets with Protestant parish church, village hall and Protestant rectory as well as houses built beginning in the latter half of the 18th century up to the mid 19th century, mostly with half-hip roofs
- Evangelical parish church, Hauptstraße 36 – Late Gothic tower, Late Baroque aisleless church, 1768; warriors' memorial tablet 1870–1871, marked 1900, Ph. Leyendecker, Ockenheim; cornerstone marked Friedenslinde 1871 ("Peace Limetree")
- Brühl 4 – Baroque timber-frame house, partly solid, from the earlier half of the 18th century
- Graveyard, at the modern mortuary – bell, marked 1454, Jakob Ott, Kreuznach
- Hauptstraße 26 – former school; stately two-and-a-half-floor Late Classicist plastered building, about 1870
- Hauptstraße 30 – complex with single roof ridge; building with half-hip roof, early 19th century
- Hauptstraße 32 – complex with single roof ridge; Late Baroque building with half-hip roof, partly timber-frame, 18th century
- Hauptstraße 45 – Protestant rectory, Late Baroque plastered building, marked 1751
- Hauptstraße 47 – three-sided estate, 18th or 19th century; Late Baroque house with single roof ridge, marked 1782
- At Hauptstraße 55 – Late Baroque portal, marked 1751
- At Hauptstraße 60 – Late Baroque doorway with skylight, marked 1780
- Hintergasse 3 – complex with single roof ridge, quarrystone, marked 1890
- Hintergasse 20 – Late Baroque building with half-hip roof, marked 1789
- Mühlstraße 15 – former Schmittenmühle (mill); three-winged complex, 18th century and earlier half of the 19th century; lordly Late Baroque building with hip roof, marked 1786
- Obergasse 1 – Late Baroque building with half-hip roof, marked 1780
- Obergasse 2 – village hall; building with half-hip roof, essentially believed to be from 1590, made over in Baroque in the 18th century, altered several times, gateway arch 1817; chimera
- Obergasse 6 – house, about 1600
- Obergasse 7 – timber-frame house, partly solid, essentially possibly from the 16th century, sandstone framing possibly from about 1900, marked 1920, as spolia a freestone, marked 1558
- Obergasse 11 – hook-shaped estate, 16th (?) to 19th centuries; house, essentially possibly from the 16th or 17th century, made over in the early 19th century, barn, partly timber-frame; on the gatepost a relief, 18th century
- Obergasse 32 – three-sided estate, 18th and 19th centuries; Baroque building with half-hip roof, partly timber-frame, marked 1718 and 1847, timber-frame barn; well with cast-iron handpump
- Obergasse 33 – three-sided estate, 18th and 19th centuries; Baroque timber-frame house, partly solid, from the earlier half of the 18th century
- Obergasse 36 – three-sided estate; house marked 1839, essentially possibly older
- At Obergasse 47 – craftsman's mark, sandstone, marked 1919
- Near Obergasse 51 – estate gate grille, late 19th century
- Schmidtgasse 5 – estate complex, 19th century; Classicist house with single roof ridge, half-hip roof, marked 1834, gateway arch marked 1837
- Schmidtgasse 6 – complex along the street; building with half-hip roof, partly timber-frame, possibly from the 18th century
- Untergasse 1 – estate complex, 19th century; post-Baroque house, marked 1808
- Bridge, on the Glan, west of the village – three-arch, sandstone-block, 1824, Building Inspectors Schwarze and Beer
- Kilometre stone, on Landesstraße 234, east of the village – sandstone, 19th century
- Vineyard house, on the Glan's left bank, west of the village – plastered building, mid 19th century

=== Memorials ===
==== Warriors' memorial tablet 1870-1871 ====
Executed by Odernheim sculptor Philipp Leyendecker, the memorial tablet to those villagers who fell in the Franco-Prussian War was festively unveiled on the 25th anniversary of the warriors' association on 15 July 1900. It is 3.55 m high and 1.40 m wide and is affixed to the church's outer wall.

==== Memorial to the Fallen 1914-1918 ====
According to art historian Anke Sommer, it was "a particular stroke of luck that the stained glass in Rehborn survived." The church windows installed in 1923 form the memorial honouring the local soldiers who fell in the First World War. Three motifs symbolize the conflict between peace and violence.

==== Monument at the graveyard ====
Seventy people from Rehborn lost their lives in the Second World War. So that their sacrifices will not be forgotten, the municipality also had the names of the dead from the First World War and the Franco-Prussian War engraved on polished granite tablets. All together this amounts to 110 fellow villagers.

=== Clubs ===
Rehborn has an angling club, the Angelsportverein Rehborn, which was founded on 25 April 1969 by 36 active members. The club leased a stretch of riverbank along the Glan some 8 km long to pursue their activities.

Very active and popular is also the soccer club, FSV 1928 REHBORN. For a full list of clubs, see https://gemeinde-rehborn.de/html/vereine.html (in German).

== Economy and infrastructure ==
=== Economic structure ===
The village's structure, which even for some time after the Second World War was strongly characterized by agriculture, adjusted quickly to the shift in circumstances after the war. For want of a local industry, many people from Rehborn commute to work, and the village transformed itself into a residential community. New building continues today.

=== Transport ===
There is currently no railway service in Rehborn itself, but the village was once on the network. This came about in 1896 with the opening of the Lautertalbahn (Lauter Valley Railway) extension from Lauterecken to Odernheim. This part of the line became part of the fully opened Glantalbahn in 1904, although this has since been disused. There is now recreational draisine touring on the local railway. Rehborn lies on Landesstraße 234. This roughly follows the River Glan, running up to neighbouring Meisenheim, where there is a junction with Bundesstraße 420, and down to neighbouring Odernheim am Glan, where there is a junction with Landesstraße 235, and onwards to Staudernheim, where there is a railway station on the Nahe Valley Railway (Bingen–Saarbrücken).
