= Lettweiler =

- Municipality
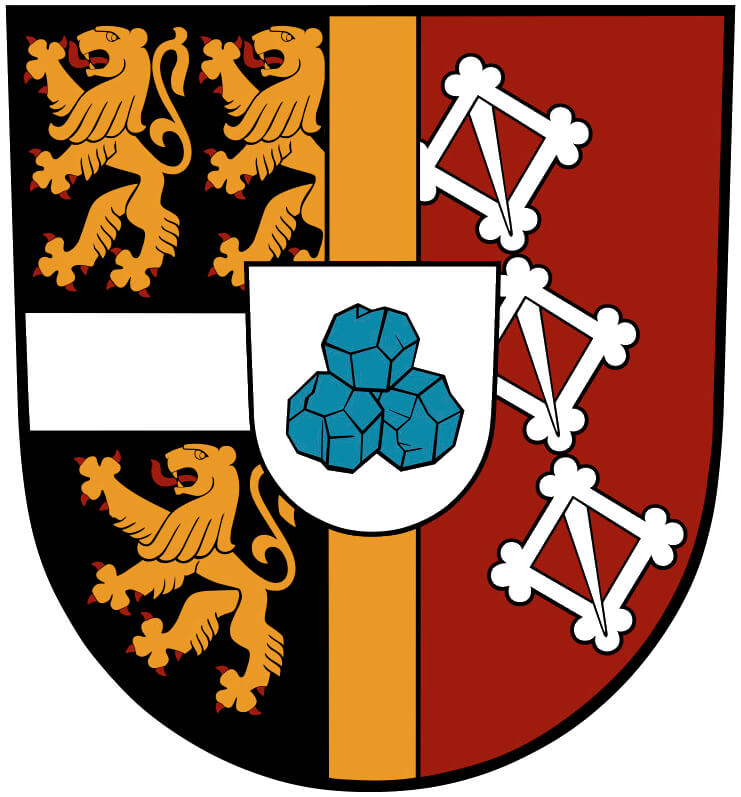
- Coat of arms

- Location of Lettweiler within Bad Kreuznach district
- Interactive map of Lettweiler
- Location within Germany Location within Rhineland-Palatinate
- Coordinates: 49°44′04″N 7°43′30″E
- Country: Germany
- State: Rhineland-Palatinate
- District: Bad Kreuznach
- Municipal assoc.: Nahe-Glan

Government
  - Mayor (2019–24): Volker Wagner

Area
  - Total: 6.28 km^{2} (2.42 sq mi)
- Elevation: 352 m (1,155 ft)

Population (2025-12-31)
  - Total: 209
  - Density: 33.3/km^{2} (86.2/sq mi)
- Time zone: UTC+01:00 (CET)
  - Summer (DST): UTC+02:00 (CEST)
- Postal codes: 67823
- Dialling codes: 06755
- Vehicle registration: KH
- Website: www.lettweiler.de

Lettweiler is an Ortsgemeinde – a municipality belonging to a Verbandsgemeinde, a kind of collective municipality – in the Bad Kreuznach district in Rhineland-Palatinate, Germany. It belongs to the Verbandsgemeinde Nahe-Glan. Lettweiler is a winegrowing village.

== Geography ==
=== Location ===
Lettweiler is a largely preserved linear village (by some definitions, a “thorpe”) lying in the North Palatine Uplands in a mountain hollow, a side dale of the Glan between Obermoschel and Odernheim am Glan. The municipal area measures 627 ha. Lettweiler preserves a rural character even today.

=== Neighbouring municipalities ===
Clockwise from the north, Lettweiler's neighbours are the municipalities of Odernheim am Glan and Duchroth, the town of Obermoschel and the municipalities of Unkenbach and Rehborn. Obermoschel and Unkenbach both lie in the neighbouring Donnersbergkreis, whereas all the others likewise lie within the Bad Kreuznach district.

=== Constituent communities ===
Also belonging to Lettweiler are the outlying homesteads of Nachtweiderhof and Neudorferhof. The latter lies some three kilometres as the crow flies from Lettweiler's main centre and was founded by Mennonites.

== History ==
In 1190, Lettweiler had its first documentary mention under the name Litwilre in a directory of landholds in which a lord, Werner II of Bolanden, stated that he had been enfeoffed with the village by the Archbishop of Mainz. In the centuries that followed, the local lordships changed several times. In 1603, Nassau-Saarbrücken ceded the village to Palatine Zweibrücken, with which it remained until the late 18th century. From 1798 to 1814, the time of French Revolutionary and Napoleonic French rule, Lettweiler belonged to the Canton of Obermoschel in the Department of Mont-Tonnerre (or Donnersberg in German). After the Congress of Vienna, Lettweiler passed in 1816 to the Rheinkreis (a newly created exclave in the Palatinate) in the Kingdom of Bavaria, where it remained until the end of the Second World War (although Bavaria had in the meantime ceased to be a kingdom). In the course of administrative restructuring in Rhineland-Palatinate, Lettweiler was transferred in 1969 from the Rockenhausen district (which was itself dissolved) to the Bad Kreuznach district. Ecclesiastically, Lettweiler (pastorate of Odernheim/deaconry of Obermoschel) belongs to the Evangelical Church of the Palatinate and the Roman Catholic Diocese of Speyer.

=== Neudorferhof ===
At the Neudorferhof, where today one of the municipality's two riding stables is to be found, the Romans long ago set up a way station where horses could be changed. In 1686, the Neudorferhof had its first documentary mention. The small settlement here was built by Mennonites, who also built a small church.

=== Municipality’s name ===
Over the centuries, the village's name changed many times (Littwiler, Lirrewilre, Lywilre, Lettwiler, Lytwyler), until sometime in the earlier half of the 20th century, the village finally settled on “Lettweiler”, the name by which it is now known.

=== Population development ===
Lettweiler's population development since Napoleonic times is shown in the table below. The figures for the years from 1871 to 1987 are drawn from census data:

Year	Inhabitants
1815	382
1835	466
1871	529
1905	509
1939	380

Year	Inhabitants
1950	426
1961	339
1970	311
1987	241
2005	249

In 1675 – 27 years after the Thirty Years' War had ended – there were only four families living in Lettweiler. In 1770, there were 51 commoners and 5 Hintersassen (roughly, “dependent peasants”). Then the population grew, reaching 502 in 1866. Until the First World War broke out, this figure only changed slightly.

== Religion ==
As at 31 October 2013, there are 216 full-time residents in Lettweiler, and of those, 145 are Evangelical (67.13%), 29 are Catholic (13.426%), 2 (0.926%) belong to other religious groups and 40 (18.519%) either have no religion or will not reveal their religious affiliation.

== Politics ==
=== Municipal council ===
The council is made up of 6 council members, who were elected by majority vote at the municipal election held on 7 June 2009, and the honorary mayor as chairman.

=== Mayor ===
Lettweiler's mayor is Volker Wagner.

== Culture and sightseeing ==
=== Buildings ===
The following are listed buildings or sites in Rhineland-Palatinate’s Directory of Cultural Monuments:

==== Lettweiler (main centre) ====
- Protestant parish church, Rehborner Straße 51 – Late Baroque aisleless church, latter half of the 18th century
- Hauptstraße 1a – gymnasium, building with hip roof, marked 1925
- Hauptstraße 63 – Baroque timber-frame house, plastered, earlier half of or mid 19th century
- Hauptstraße 65 – Baroque timber-frame house, possibly from the earlier half of the 18th century
- Hauptstraße 66 – estate complex; essentially Baroque timber-frame house, plastered, presumably from the 17th or 18th century
- Hintergasse 41 – estate complex along the street; small house, partly timber-frame, marked 1808
- Hintergasse 43 – former school; building with hip roof, mid 19th century
- Rehborner Straße 50 – former Protestant rectory estate; Baroque buildings with half-hip roofs, 18th century
- Schäferhügel 28 – Baroque timber-frame house, partly solid, earlier half of the 18th century

==== Neudorferhof ====
- Mennonite church, Neudorferhof 100 – Classicist building with hip roof, marked 1885
- Neudorferhof 97 – three-sided estate; one-and-a-half-floor Late Classicist house, marked 1877, Wirtschaftsgebäude
- Neudorferhof 101 – estate complex; eingeschossiges Wohnhaus, marked 1831, commercial building
- Neudorferhof 97–102 (Neudorferhof monumental zone) – Mennonite settlement from 1789, church from 1885, estate complexes from the 19th century, big firepond; walled Mennonite graveyard

The 17th-century church was built to replace a 14th-century village chapel after this had fallen into disrepair and had to be torn down.

=== Natural monuments ===
Lettweiler has one listed natural monument, the Dicke Eiche (“Fat Oak”; no. ND-7133-424). This stands east of the village in the rural cadastral area known as “Auf der Trift”.

=== Winegrowing ===
Lettweiler has a long tradition of winegrowing. The vineyards belong to the Nahe wine region. Even today, there is still one winemaker in the village, the Erwin Lamb winery.

=== Sport and leisure ===
Lettweiler has a sporting ground and a multipurpose hall.

=== Clubs ===
The following clubs are active in Lettweiler:

- Förderverein Feuerwehr — fire brigade promotional association
- Gesangverein 1869 e.V. Lettweiler — singing club
- Landfrauenverein — countrywomen's club
- TuS Lettweiler — gymnastic and sport club
- Volksbildungswerk Odernheim/Lettweiler — “people’s education”

== Economy and infrastructure ==
=== Transport ===
To the southeast runs Bundesstraße 420. Leading through the village itself is Kreisstraße 78, off which branches Kreisstraße 77 in the middle of the village. Serving Staudernheim is a railway station on the Nahe Valley Railway (Bingen–Saarbrücken).
