= Nordfeld Consolidated Coal Mine =

Mine in Germany

The Nordfeld Consolidated Coal Mine (German: Steinkohlenbergwerk Consolidirtes Nordfeld, or Grube Nordfeld) was a large-scale but ultimately short-lived and unsuccessful German mining operation on the border of the present-day states of Saarland and Rhineland-Palatinate (Rheinland-Pfalz). It existed from 1889 and 1905 in the Pfaffen Woods (Pfaffenwald) on the northern slope of Höcherberg (Mt. Höcher) in the vicinity of the Saarland town of Höchen and the Rheinland-Pfalz towns of Waldmohr and Dunzweiler. The mine's second shaft, named "Wilhelmine," was the deepest in the entire Saar area at the time.

== History ==
After a coal mine had been established in nearby Bexbach-Frankenholz in 1879, a merchant from Leipzig named Moritz Rosenthal received a concession for a mine at Höcherberg in 1887. The assumption was that the Frankenholz seams would continue in a north-easterly direction, and based on boring samples there were four seams of coal available. Two shafts were eventually sunk: The Fortuna Shaft (Schacht Fortuna) and the Wilhelmine Shaft (Schacht Wihelmine). By 1894 the Fortuna Shaft had been dug to a depth of 628 meters but did not yield coal as expected. Nonetheless, in 1897 an expert submitted a new (and possibly embellished) report predicting an annual output of 300,000 tons for 105 years. In that same year work on the Wilhelmine Shaft began, and eventually went down to a depth of 867 meters. Connecting the two mining shafts was horizontal access tunnel at a depth of 79 meters. The tunnel's mouth ("Stollenmundloch") exited the mountain in the Brandsbach Valley where the company also had various facilities.

Full mining production started in 1902 via an endless cable system of ore cars that delivered coal from the Stollenmundloch to an unloading station where the coal was transferred to standard-gauge railroad hopper cars of the Northfeldbahn short line. Once the cars had been loaded with coal they were transported along a 4.2-kilometer route which ran beside the headwaters of the Glan River, through central Waldmohr, and then to a siding at the Waldmohr-Jagersburg Station where the Northfeldbahn connected with the Glan Valley Railway (Glantalbahn).

Based on the geological conditions actually found underground it soon became clear that the amount of coal that could be extracted economically would be out of proportion to the investments already made. On top of that an attempt to extend the mining concession north and northwest beyond the borders of the Kingdom of Bavaria into Prussian territory failed due to Prussia's veto. The company went bankrupt and the mine was closed on 1 January 1905 putting 500 miners out of work. 7.5 million marks, and immense sum at the time, had been invested in Nordfeld Consolidated. The machines and conveying equipment were later sold to the Frankenholz mine.

== Today ==
In the districts of Waldmohr and Höchen one can still find the overgrown evidence of this bad investment, from walls and tailing piles to long-unused access roads. A 6-kilometer hiking trail with historical signage and directional markers leads visitors around and through the remains of the operation.
