= Odernheim am Glan =

- Municipality
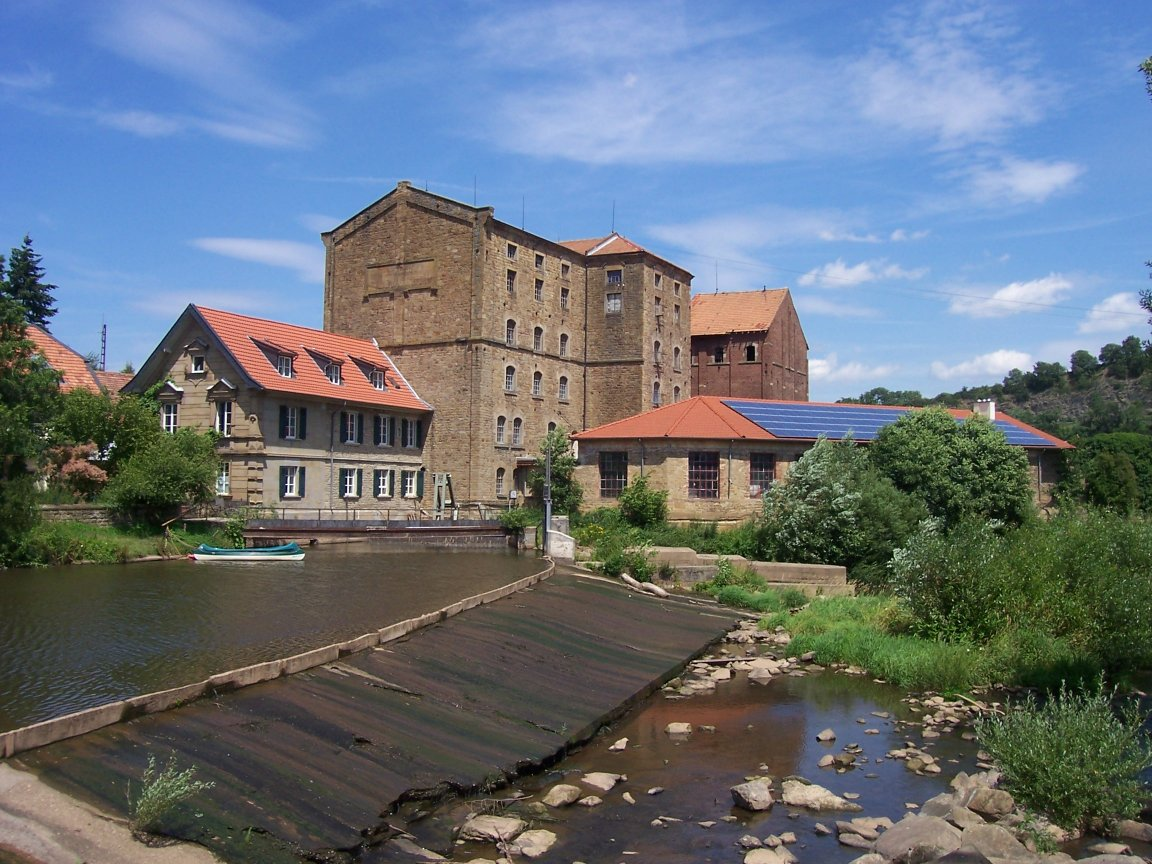
- Staudernheimer Straße 1 – former estate mill

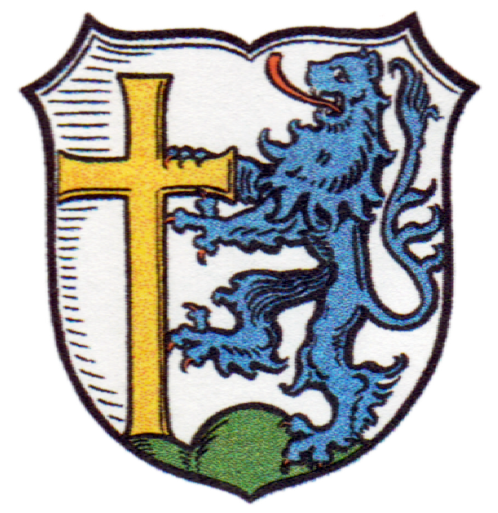
- Coat of arms

- Location of Odernheim am Glan within Bad Kreuznach district
- Interactive map of Odernheim am Glan
- Location within Germany Location within Rhineland-Palatinate
- Coordinates: 49°45′55.48″N 7°42′17.28″E
- Country: Germany
- State: Rhineland-Palatinate
- District: Bad Kreuznach
- Municipal assoc.: Nahe-Glan

Government
  - Mayor (2019–24): Achim Schick (CDU)

Area
  - Total: 13.26 km^{2} (5.12 sq mi)
- Elevation: 141 m (463 ft)

Population (2025-12-31)
  - Total: 1,737
  - Density: 131.0/km^{2} (339.3/sq mi)
- Time zone: UTC+01:00 (CET)
  - Summer (DST): UTC+02:00 (CEST)
- Postal codes: 55571
- Dialling codes: 06755
- Vehicle registration: KH
- Website: www.odernheim.de

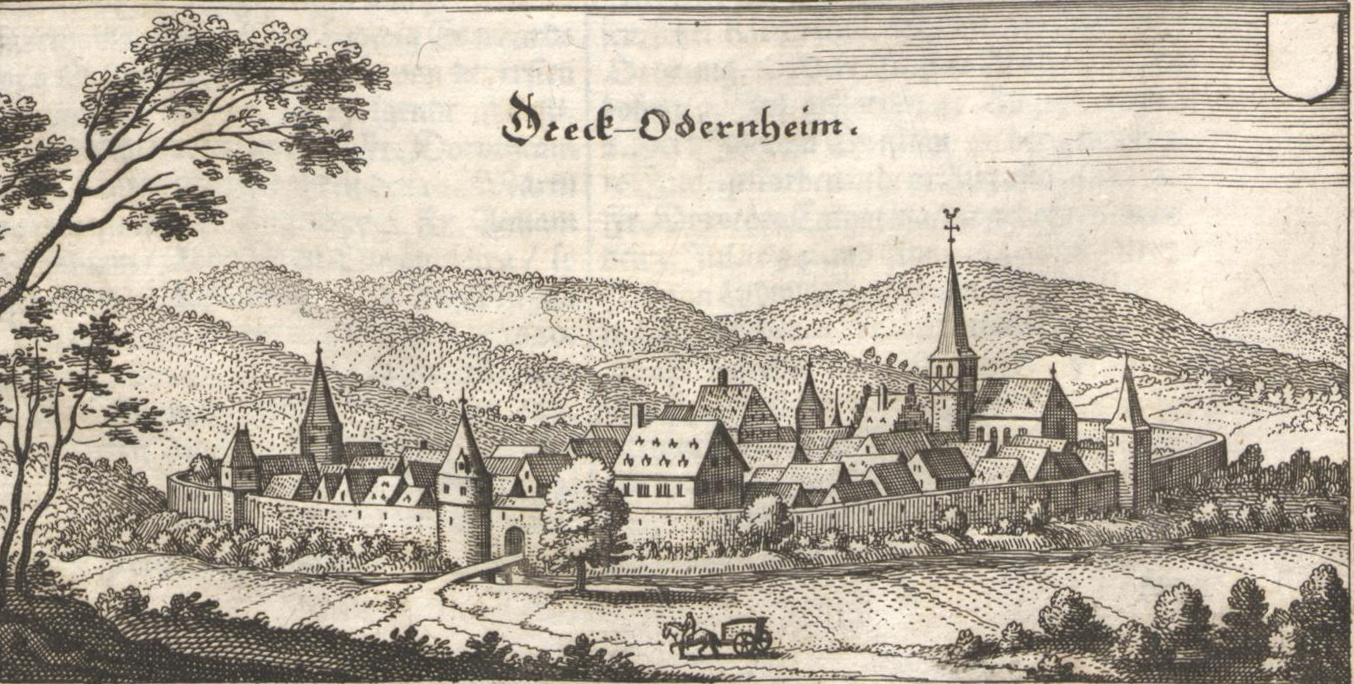
Odernheim in the 17th century (Matthäus Merian)

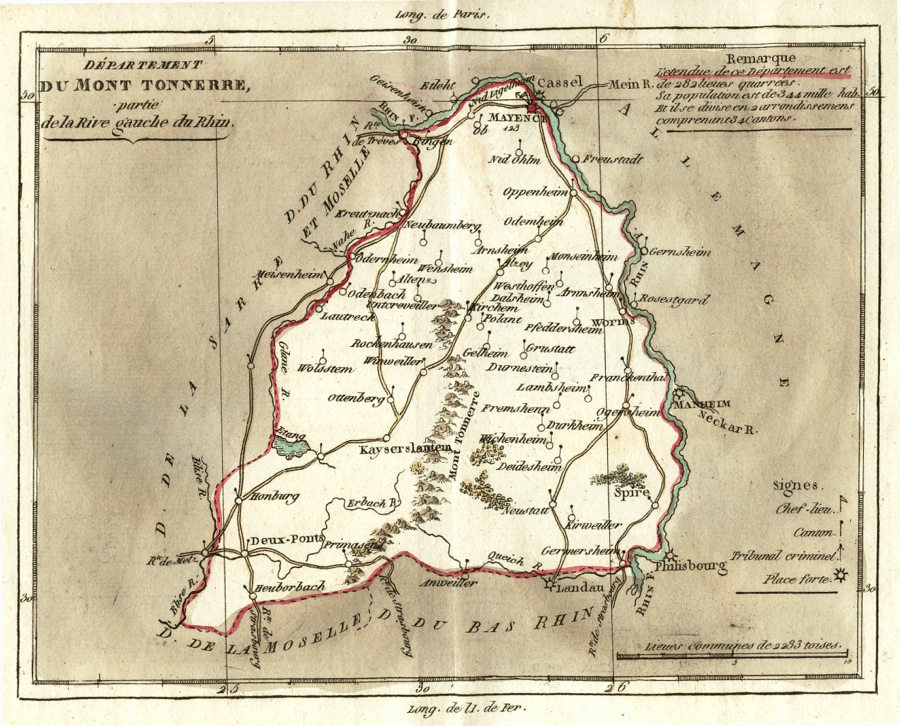
Odernheim in the northwest of the Department of Mont-Tonnerre (or Donnersberg in German) in the early 19th century

Odernheim am Glan is an Ortsgemeinde – a municipality belonging to a Verbandsgemeinde, a kind of collective municipality – in the Bad Kreuznach district in Rhineland-Palatinate, Germany. It belongs to the Verbandsgemeinde Nahe-Glan. Odernheim is a winegrowing village.

== Geography ==
=== Location ===
Odernheim lies at the edge of the North Palatine Uplands at the mouth of the River Glan, where it empties into the River Nahe. This village, lying at the foot of the Disibodenberg, an important monastic centre in the Middle Ages, is surrounded by vineyards, forests and meadows in the southeastern part of the Verbandsgemeinde of Bad Sobernheim, and in the middle of the Nahe wine region. Among nearby towns, the Verbandsgemeinde seat of Bad Sobernheim lies 4 km to the northwest, the district seat of Bad Kreuznach 16 km to the northeast, Kirn 20 km to the west and Meisenheim 7 km to the south. Farther afield, Bingen am Rhein lies roughly 27 km to the north-northeast, while to the northeast lie Mainz (48 km), Wiesbaden just beyond and Frankfurt (80 km)

=== Neighbouring municipalities ===
Clockwise from the north, Odernheim's neighbours are the municipalities of Staudernheim, Duchroth, Lettweiler, Rehborn and Abtweiler, all of which likewise lie within the Bad Kreuznach district.

=== Constituent communities ===
Also belonging to Odernheim am Glan are the outlying homesteads of Am Kapellenberg, Birkenhof, Charlottenhof, Elsenpfuhl, Heddarterhof, Niedermühle, Sonnenberghof, Disibodenberg and Disibodenbergerhof.

=== Palaeontology ===
Some 290,000,000 years ago, in Rotliegend times during the Early Permian, a freshwater lake stretched out near what is now Odernheim am Glan, living in which were predatory ancient amphibians, now known to palaeontologists as Sclerocephalus haeuseri, that reached up to two metres in length. Known worldwide are the little Branchiosauridae (gilled lizards) Apateon pedestris and Micromelerpeton credneri from Odernheim. Also yielded by the investigations have been fossils of mayflies. Some fossils from Odernheim are on show at the Palaeontological Museum in Nierstein.

== History ==
Odernheim am Glan is an early Frankish settlement that had its first documentary mention in 976 by Archbishop Willigis of Mainz. It is believed that the Franks founded Odernheim in the 5th or 6th century. By this time, the land already belonged to the Archbishopric of Mainz. In 1108, a Benedictine monastery was founded on the hill near Odernheim at the forks of the Nahe and the Glan, known as the Disibodenberg, and in 1112, Jutta von Sponheim (~1092–1136), Hildegard of Bingen (1098–1179) and a girl whose name is unknown entered a women's cell at the Benedictine monastery that had been specially built for them. Her epithet “of Bingen” notwithstanding, it was at the Disibodenberg near Odernheim that Hildegard lived the longest time in one place. In 1147, Hildegard had a vision that moved her to have a convent built down at the mouth of the Nahe, where it empties into the Rhine at Bingen, on the Rupertsberg. The number of nuns in Hildegard's sisterhood had been growing steadily, and in 1150, she and 18 other nuns moved from Disibodenberg Abbey to the new convent on Bingen's Rupertsberg. In the 12th century, the Archbishopric enfeoffed the Counts of Veldenz with the land on which Odernheim stood, and they later came to own it themselves. In 1349, Odernheim was granted town rights by Emperor Karl IV, allowing the village to fortify itself with walls and towers, hold a market and set up a town court with a Schultheiß. The last of the Counts of Veldenz, namely Friedrich III, died in 1444. His daughter Anna married King Ruprecht's son Count Palatine Stephan of the House of Wittelsbach. By uniting his own Palatine holdings with the now otherwise heirless County of Veldenz – his wife had inherited the county upon her father's death, but not his comital title – and by redeeming the hitherto pledged County of Zweibrücken, Stephan founded a new County Palatine, as whose comital residence he chose the town of Zweibrücken: the County Palatine of Zweibrücken, later a duchy. Beginning then, the village belonged to this state. During the War of the Succession of Landshut, Odernheim was besieged in 1504, and after the townsmen's fierce defence, overrun and subsequently almost utterly destroyed. Bits of the old town wall can still be seen today. Standing as witness to the later reconstruction is the town hall, built in 1541, in whose tower a bell from Disibodenberg Abbey still hangs. Indeed, Odernheim's history was from yore tightly bound to the now ruined abbey, which for 40 years was where Saint Hildegard of Bingen lived and worked. In 1567, Duke Wolfgang of Zweibrücken had the Zweibrücker Schlösschen (“little palatial residence”) built near the Upper Gate (Obertor) for his daughter Countess Palatine Christine. This still stands today and is an important point of interest. The Thirty Years' War brought Odernheim much hardship, but worse still, its end did not bring the peace that everybody had been hoping for. In the course of French King Louis XIV's wars of conquest – specifically, during the Nine Years' War (known in Germany as the Pfälzischer Erbfolgekrieg, or War of the Palatine Succession) – French troops set Odernheim on fire in 1689. In 1786, Odernheim passed under the terms of the Selz-Hagenbach Exchange Treaty from the Duchy of Palatinate-Zweibrücken to Electoral Palatinate. This arrangement did not last long, for by 1797, French Revolutionary troops had overrun the German lands on the Rhine’s left bank and they had been annexed to the French state. It was then that Odernheim lost its town rights, and it has since never regained them. It became a mairie (“mayoralty”), finding itself in the Canton of Obermoschel, the Arrondissement of Kaiserslautern and the Department of Mont-Tonnerre (or Donnersberg in German). In 1814, the now Napoleonic French were driven out of the region by the Prussian general Gebhard Leberecht von Blücher. Under the terms laid out by the Congress of Vienna, Odernheim passed in 1816 to the Kingdom of Bavaria. The border between this state and neighbouring Prussia ran between Staudernheim and Odernheim. Odernheim remained Bavarian through the rest of the 19th century, Imperial times, Weimar times and the Third Reich, only becoming part of the present Rhineland-Palatinate after the Second World War. Already after the First World War (1914-1918), all monarchs had been forced to abdicate. Odernheim then belonged to the Regierungsbezirk of Pfalz (“Palatinate”) and the Rockenhausen district. In the course of administrative restructuring in Rhineland-Palatinate after the Second World War, however, Odernheim was grouped on 7 June 1969 into the Bad Kreuznach district and the Regierungsbezirk of Koblenz. The latter has since been dissolved along with all Rhineland-Palatinate's Regierungsbezirke. On 7 November 1970, the Bürgermeisterei (“Mayoralty”) of Odernheim am Glan was dissolved and the Ortsgemeinde of Odernheim was assigned to the Verbandsgemeinde of Sobernheim. From an ecclesiastical standpoint, Odernheim still belongs to the Evangelical Church of the Palatinate (Evangelical) and the Roman Catholic Diocese of Speyer.

=== Population development ===
Odernheim am Glan's population development since Napoleonic times is shown in the table below. The figures for the years from 1871 to 1987 are drawn from census data:

Year	Inhabitants
1815	845
1835	1,192
1871	1,333
1905	1,604
1939	1,664

Year	Inhabitants
1950	1,809
1961	1,983
1970	1,991
1987	1,800
2005	1,774

== Religion ==
As at 30 November 2013, there are 1,718 full-time residents in Odernheim, and of those, 1,113 are Evangelical (64.785%), 303 are Catholic (17.637%), 19 (1.106%) belong to other religious groups and 283 (16.473%) either have no religion or will not reveal their religious affiliation.

== Politics ==
=== Municipal council ===
The council is made up of 16 council members, who were elected by proportional representation at the municipal election held on 7 June 2009, and the honorary mayor as chairman. The municipal election held on 7 June 2009 yielded the following results:

Year	SPD	CDU	WGR	WGR	Total
2009	6	8	1	1	16 seats
2004	9	5	2	–	16 seats

=== Mayor ===
Odernheim's mayor is Achim Schick (CDU), and his deputies are Rainer Hildenbrand (CDU), Hans Jörg Lenhoff (SPD) and Claudia Schatto (CDU).

=== Coat of arms ===
The German blazon reads: In Silber auf grünem Dreiberg rechts ein goldenes Hochkreuz, auf das ein links danebenstehender blauer, goldbewehrter und rotbezungter Löwe die Pranke legt.

The municipality's arms might in English heraldic language be described thus: Argent in base a trimount vert upon which dexter a cross Latin Or and sinister a lion rampant azure armed of the third and langued gules with his gambe on the cross.

=== Town partnerships ===
Odernheim fosters partnerships with the following places:

- (Germany) Müggelheim, Berlin-Treptow-Köpenick since 1997

Müggelheim was founded in 1747 by people from Odernheim am Glan. The partnership was founded on the occasion of the 250th anniversary of Müggelheim’s founding.

== Culture and sightseeing ==
=== Buildings ===
The following are listed buildings or sites in Rhineland-Palatinate’s Directory of Cultural Monuments:

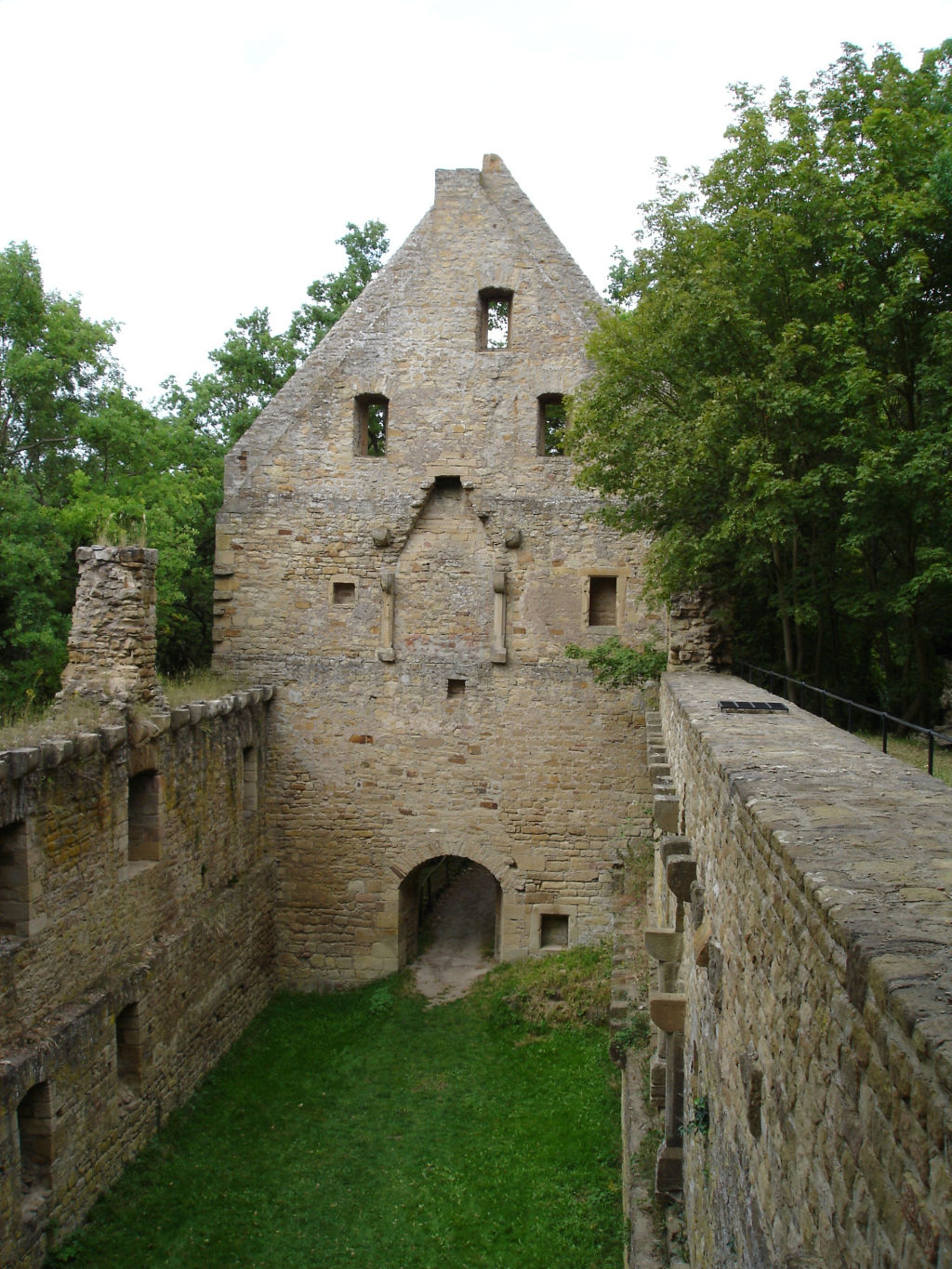
Disibodenberg Abbey ruin

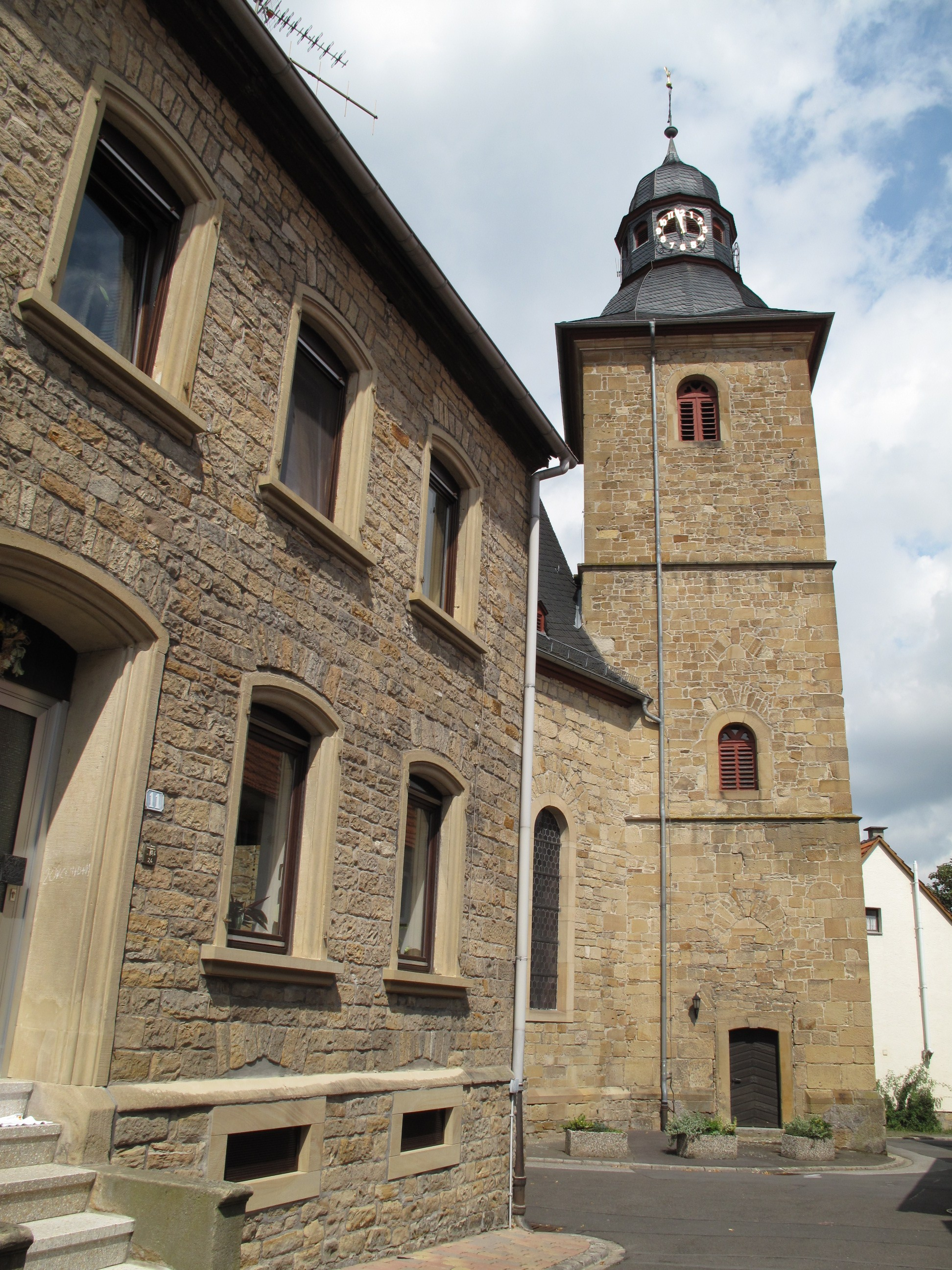
Hintergasse 9 – Protestant parish church

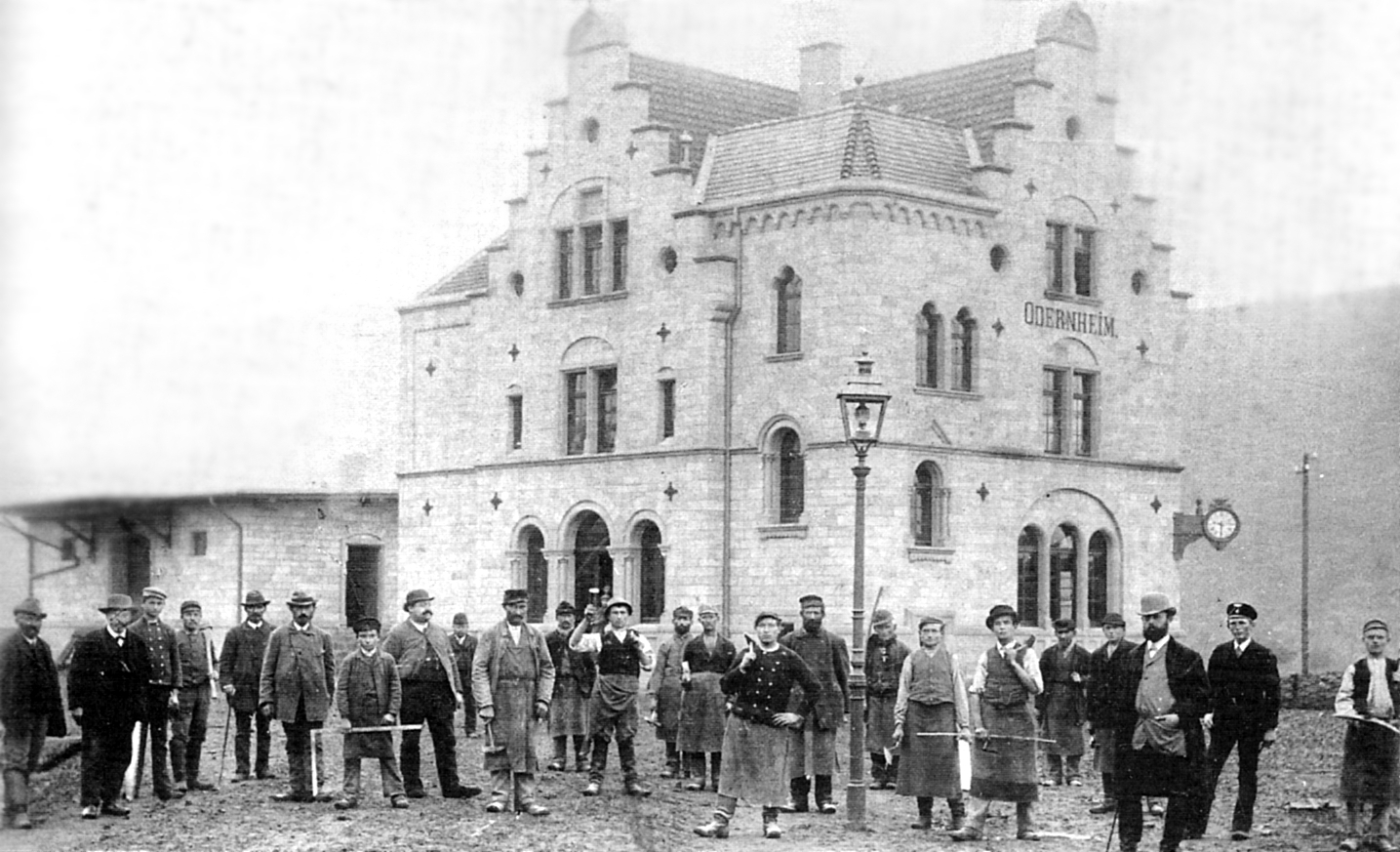
Odernheim railway station shortly after its completion in the late 19th century

- Village core (monumental zone) – oval of the village centre enclosed from about 1349 by the former town fortifications (Upper Gate [Obertor], town wall remnants near Bahnhofstraße, former moat in the west) with many buildings, especially from the 16th and 17th centuries, but also the 18th and 19th, among them timber-frame buildings
- Protestant parish church, Hintergasse 9 – Baroque hewn-stone building, marked 1738
- Bahnhofstraße – warriors’ memorial 1870-1871, obelisk, last fourth of the 19th century
- Bahnhofstraße 6 – Late Gründerzeit estate complex, marked 1901
- Bahnhofstraße 11 – former railway station; two-and-a-half-floor Historicist sandstone-block building, marked 1895, goods shed, signal box 1891
- Gigertsgasse 1 – former Schloss of the Dukes of Palatinate-Zweibrücken; Renaissance quarrystone building with staircase tower, 1567; spire light with loggia possibly from the 1920s
- Gigertsgasse 7 – Renaissance building, about 1600, altered in the 19th century
- Hauptstraße 6 – Renaissance building, about 1600
- Hauptstraße 17 – town hall; Late Gothic building with half-hip roof, quarrystone, 1540/1541, destroyed in 1689, reconstructed in 1768, 1774, 1776; ridge turret with bell, 1370
- At Hauptstraße 28 – hearth heating plate, Baroque, 18th century
- At Hauptstraße 30 – building inscription, marked 1801
- Hauptstraße 34 – Renaissance quarrystone building, partly timber-frame, marked 1564
- Hauptstraße 42/43 – Obertor (“Upper Gate”), building with hip roof, quarrystone and timber-frame, after 1349, today's appearance Late Baroque, marked 1763, 1924 and 1977/84; Wappenstein
- Hauptstraße 44 – timber-frame house, partly solid, marked 1821, essentially older (timber framing 18th century, Renaissance windows about 1600)
- At Hauptstraße 51 – front-door keystone, marked 1754
- Hintergasse (no number) – former school; Late Classicist building with half-hip roof, possibly from about 1830, extra floor built in later 19th century
- Hintergasse 11/12 – former teacher's dwelling; small-block building, third fourth of the 19th century, barn
- Hintergasse 29 – Baroque timber-frame house, marked 1710
- Hinterruthen 1 – Late Historicist villa with hip roof, marked 1904
- Lettweiler Straße, graveyard – A. Schmidt tomb, Late Classicist grave column, about 1877; F. Welsch tomb, Gothic Revival stele, Gründerzeit gravestones, about 1885
- Ransengasse 2/3 – estate complex, 18th and 19th centuries; timber-frame house, essentially possibly Baroque, 18th century
- Ransengasse 12 – Renaissance house, about 1600
- Raumgarten 2 – Late Baroque building with half-hip roof, Rococo portal, marked 1793
- Raumgarten 3 – house with single roof ridge, partly timber-frame, 18th century
- Rehborner Straße 1 – former tannery; Late Classicist house, marked 1853; side building, tanning house possibly from about 1800
- Staudernheimer Straße 1 – former estate mill
- Staudernheimer Straße 2 – villa; two-and-a-half-floor sandstone-block building, Art Nouveau, 1905/1910, architect Zimmermann, Kreuznach
- Turnhallstraße 3 – Disibodenberg-Schule (school); long building with hip roof, quarrystone, about 1900
- Turnhallstraße 6 – gymnasium; group of buildings, hewn-stone, Heimatstil, about 1910
- Untergasse 1 – Baroque timber-frame house, partly solid, 18th century, front door marked 1847
- Untergasse 2 – timber-frame house, partly solid, 17th century
- Disibodenberger Hof, north of the village – three estate locations with well preserved commercial buildings arranged around a yard (cobblestones), 18th/19th century, Late Classicist house with gateway arch, about 185x?; barn with half-hip roof and gateway arch; on another commercial building an inscription stone marked 1608
- Disibodenberg Abbey ruin, Disibodenberger Hof 1, north of the village (monumental zone) – 12th to 16th centuries; remnants of the Romanesque church and convent building; so-called hospice, Late Gothic gabled building, 16th century
- Staudernheimer Straße 19 – villa; building with pyramid roof, 1920s
- Vineyard house, Am Disibodenberg, north of the village – timber-frame, possibly from the 18th century or early 19th century

=== Disibodenberg Abbey ===
Odernheim's history was from days of yore tightly bound with Disibodenberg’s. It was here that Saint Hildegard of Bingen lived for more than 40 years, having devoted her life to God's service at this monastery, and later at a convent that she founded at Bingen am Rhein. The abbey ruin's old walls bear witness to a bygone time when religious belief was foremost. The Romans and even the Celts before them had recognized the site's mystical qualities in antiquity and prehistory and had sought the Disibodenberg out as a place of worship. Even today, this religious site's spirit and mystique can be sensed. On show at the abbey museum are interesting archaeological finds, treasures and documentation. The Scivias-Stiftung (foundation), whose goal is the maintenance and care of the ruin, the museum and the new chapel, was founded in 1989.

=== Regular events ===
Yearly events in Odernheim am Glan include the kermis (church consecration festival, locally known as the Kerb) in the autumn and the Christmas Market during Advent.

=== Clubs ===
The following clubs are active in Odernheim am Glan:

- Disibodenberg Blasorchester Odernheim 1969 e.V. — wind orchestra
- Leben und Lernen in Solidariät und Gemeinschaft e.V. — Catholic youth volunteer group
- Turnverein Odernheim 1890 e.V. — gymnastic club
- Förderverein Kindertagesstätte Lilliput e.V. — kindergarten promotional association
- Odernheimer Geschichte(n) — history club
- Landfrauen — countrywomen's club
- Arabaska Tanzgruppe — dance group
- Die Glantaler — music group
- FNVO — fishing and conservation club
- Feuerwehr Förderverein — fire brigade promotional association
- Feuerwehr — fire brigade
- CDU — Christian Democratic Union of Germany
- Närrischen Kicker — Shrovetide Carnival (Fastnacht) club
- Sport-Club Odernheim
- Begegnungsstätte Bannmühle e.V. — social club
- KinO — cultural initiative club
- Schützenverein Odernheim — shooting club

=== Sport and leisure ===
==== Hiking ====
Many hiking trails lead along brooks that are close to nature, flower-rich glades, fallow vineyards with exotic orchids, through dales and over hilltops with views, and all furnished with benches for resting.

==== Cycling ====
The Nahe-Radweg, a 120 km-long cycle path, opens to the cyclist the Naheland from the river's source in Nohfelden down to the mouth at Bingen am Rhein. Twenty side routes offer many other possibilities, and a total length of 500 km. The Glan to Blies Cycleway, with a length of 125 km, leads from the Glan's mouth, where it empties into the Nahe, through Odernheim and onwards to Sarreguemines in France.

==== Draisine touring ====
One popular way of exploring the Glan valley is by pedalled draisine. One can travel up to 40 km on the disused railway from Altenglan near Kusel by way of Lauterecken, Meisenheim and Odernheim all the way to Staudernheim. At many points, halts have been set up where riders may lift the draisine off the track and have a rest, stop to eat or have a look at a point of interest.

==== Canoeing on the Glan ====
On offer are half-day or full-day tours from Medard (17 km) or Meisenheim (8.5 km) going downstream in three-man open canoes to Odernheim.

==== Other ====
Also found locally are paragliding, tennis, riding, angling on the Glan, Nordic walking and many other sport and leisure pursuits.

== Economy and infrastructure ==
=== Winegrowing ===
As a winegrowing village in the Nahe wine region, Odernheim am Glan has several Weingüter (wineries):

- Weingut H. Grossarth

Grossarth runs not only a winery, but at certain times of the year also a Strausswirtschaft, a kind of informal eatery at which meals are served along with the winery’s products.

- Weingut Klostermühle

The Klostermühle (“Abbey Mill”) winery arose in the Middle Ages as a commercial estate of the now ruined nearby Disibodenberg Abbey. After the Reformation, ownership passed to the Dukes of Palatinate-Zweibrücken. From the mid 18th century until 1992, the winery was run by the Family Schmidt, when Dr. Peter Becker and Christian Held acquired it. The latter is still the head of the winery, which has added Sekt to its products, and of the distillery in Meisenheim, which produces high-quality spirits from fruits and pomace.

- Weingut Hofmann
- Weingut von Racknitz

The Racknitz winery lies on what was once the estate of the now ruined Disibodenberg Abbey, whose Benedictine brethren were growing wine here 900 years ago. Its individual winegrowing locations – Einzellagen – are as follows:

1. Odernheimer Kloster Disibodenberg
2. Niederhäuser Klamm
3. Niederhäuser Hermannshöhle
4. Schloßböckelheimer Königsfels
5. Traiser Rotenfels
6. Oberhäuser Kieselberg
7. Niederhäuser Kertz
8. Niederhäuser Rosenheck
- Weingut Schick

=== Transport ===
Odernheim lies on Landesstraßen 234 and 235 and Kreisstraße 78. The nearest Bundesstraßen are the B 41 and the B 420, which are each about 6 or 7 km away. Local passenger transport is provided by Omnibusverkehr Rhein-Nahe (ORN) with bus routes linking with the Deutsche Bahn railway network at Lauterecken, Altenglan, Staudernheim and Bad Sobernheim. There is also a bus link to and from Bad Münster am Stein. There is currently no railway service in Odernheim itself, but the village was once on the network. This came about in 1896 with the opening of the Lautertalbahn (Lauter Valley Railway) extension from Lauterecken to Odernheim. This part of the line became part of the fully opened Glantalbahn in 1904, although this has since been disused. Since this railway split into two branches at Odernheim, one leading to Staudernheim station and the other to Bad Münster am Stein station, Odernheim station became a minor railway junction. The line along with these two branches has since been disused. The Glantalbahn is now used for recreational draisine travel.

=== Education ===
Odernheim has one kindergarten and one primary school.

=== Tourism ===
The draisine tours on the local disused railway line have gradually made the village better known to visitors, and there are several inns in Odernheim where they can stay overnight.

== Famous people ==
=== Sons and daughters of the town ===
- Heinrich Will (1808–1876), Hesse-Homburg politician and Member of the Landtag
- Carl Schmidt (1850–1915), Member of the Reichstag and mayor
- Karl Schworm (1889–1956), National Socialist, writer and regional poet

=== Famous people associated with the municipality ===
- Henry Nadig (1843–1927), mechanic and developer of one of the first gasoline-powered cars in the United States in 1891
