= Saar–Nahe Basin =

Molasse basin in southwest Germany

Saar–Nahe Basin is a molasse basin in southwest Germany. The basin is located south of the Hunsrück mountains between the rivers Nahe and the Saar. The aggregation of sediments in the basin started in the late Carboniferous and Early Permian as part of the Variscan orogeny.

== See also ==
- Saar-Nahe Hills
