= Gries, Germany =

Gries
- Municipality
- Coat of arms

- Location of Gries within Kusel district
- Interactive map of Gries
- Location within Germany Location within Rhineland-Palatinate
- Coordinates: 49°25′09″N 7°24′02″E
- Country: Germany
- State: Rhineland-Palatinate
- District: Kusel
- Municipal assoc.: Oberes Glantal

Government
  - Mayor (2019–24): Olaf Klein (SPD)

Area
  - Total: 4.04 km^{2} (1.56 sq mi)
- Elevation: 280 m (920 ft)

Population (2025-12-31)
  - Total: 1,055
  - Density: 261/km^{2} (676/sq mi)
- Time zone: UTC+01:00 (CET)
  - Summer (DST): UTC+02:00 (CEST)
- Postal codes: 66903
- Dialling codes: 06373
- Vehicle registration: KUS
- Website: www.gries-pfalz.de

Gries (German pronunciation: [ɡʁiːs]) is an Ortsgemeinde – a municipality belonging to a Verbandsgemeinde, a kind of collective municipality – in the Kusel district in Rhineland-Palatinate, Germany. It belongs to the Verbandsgemeinde of Oberes Glantal, whose seat is in Schönenberg-Kübelberg.

== Geography ==
=== Location ===
The municipality lies at the edge of the North Palatine Uplands (part of the Saar-Nahe Uplands), on the south slope of the 314 m-high Schlossberg, which has an outstanding view, in the Western Palatinate. To the south lies the Ohmbach valley with its 10-18 ha Ohmbach Reservoir, and to the east, the river Glan has carved a prominent bend into the uplands. Gries lies in a gently sloping spot whose elevation ranges from 270 to 310 m above sea level. Northwest of the village is another high hill called the Löwenberg. East of the village at the municipal limit with the neighbouring municipality of Bruchmühlbach-Miesau (Ortsteil of Elschbach), the Ohmbach empties into the river Glan, which thence, going upstream, forms the said limit between the two municipalities. North of the village, almost all the way to the neighbouring village of Börsborn, lies the Lebecksmühle, where for centuries the waterwheel turned, and which later became a popular country public house, although nowadays it is a private house. Woods stretch out south of the village at the reservoir's shore, with a grove of sequoias, and also in the northern municipal area. Near the reservoir's shore stands a festival hall with a kiosk, and nearby is a grilling facility with a pavilion. The village is surrounded by a well-developed network of farm lanes, hiking trails and cycle paths. The municipal area measures 400 ha, of which 50 ha is wooded.

=== Neighbouring municipalities ===
Gries borders in the north on the municipality of Börsborn, in the northeast on the municipality of Nanzdietschweiler, in the east on the municipality of Hütschenhausen, in the southeast on the municipality of Bruchmühlbach-Miesau (outlying centre of Elschbach, in the Kaiserslautern district), in the south on the municipality of Schönenberg-Kübelberg (outlying centre of Sand) and in the west on the municipality of Brücken.

=== Constituent communities ===
Also belonging to Gries is the outlying homestead of Lebecksmühle.

=== Municipality’s layout ===
The municipality of Gries is among the Kusel district's bigger villages. The oldest part of the built-up area arose along the middle part of what is today Hauptstraße (“Main Street”), which runs from the heights to the reservoir's west shore in a broad bow. Likewise older building is found on Triftstraße, with the old schoolhouse (now a community centre and clubhouse), on Schlossbergstraße, Friedhofstraße, Goethestraße, on the north side of Raiffeisenring and Bahnhofstraße. This last street's name means “Railway Station Street”, and indeed it does lead to the former railway station between Elschbach and Sand. The graveyard with its consecration hall and Protestant church (built in 1964) is framed by Raiffeisenring and Friedhofstraße. The Catholic youth centre, at which church services are also held once a week, stands in the village's north end on Sportplatzstraße. Stretching round the older parts of the village are areas with newer building, at the ends of Hauptstraße, on Schillerstraße, Schillerstraße and the south side of Raiffeisenring as well as in the Eckenfeld and the Rechental. In the Schlossberg's heights lies the sporting ground with its clubhouse.

== History ==
=== Antiquity ===
As long ago as prehistoric times, the vicinity was inhabited by man, bearing witness to which are barrows from the Bronze Age and the Iron Age. Archaeological finds made at digs long ago have today for the most part disappeared, although a few are still kept at the Museum des Historischen Vereins der Pfalz (Museum of the Historical Society of the Palatinate) in Speyer. There are no finds from Roman times that can be definitively linked to Gries, although there have been some in neighbouring municipal areas, foremost among these Miesau’s.

=== Middle Ages ===
From the contiguous Free Imperial Domain (freies Reichsland) around Castle Lautern, Frankish kings split certain areas away in the Early Middle Ages to donate them to both ecclesiastical and secular lordships. Great parts passed into the Salians’ ownership. In 737, Count Werner I from the Salian dynasty endowed the Hornbach Monastery, whose first abbot was Saint Pirmin. Werner furnished the monastery richly, giving it estates and lands, including the Münchweiler valley, which in turn included Gries. As a fief of the Hornbach Monastery with its hub at Glan-Münchweiler, all villages in the Münchweiler valley passed in 1323 first to the Raugraves in the Nahegau, and thereafter, in 1344, to the Archbishop of Trier and then to the Breidenborns.

Gries likely arose sometime around 1100. The name zuom ’griß (as it was originally recorded) meant in Middle High German “gravelly, sandy ground”; the Modern High German word Grieß – pronounced the same way as “Gries” – still means “grit”, and is cognate with that English word. The addition of zuom (Modern High German: zum; meaning: “at the”) may be taken to mean that the locality was an outlying rural area belonging to another municipality. These were split apart from each other, perhaps in the course of the introduction of three-field crop rotation. As the nearest place that already existed at the time, it seems likely that zuom ’griß once belonged to Kübelberg. Thought to have arisen at the same time as Gries are Sand (zuom sand, “at the sand”, nowadays an outlying centre of Schönenberg-Kübelberg) and Miesau, even if different founding dates are given for each (these rest mainly on first documentary mentions, though). In 1383, Gries had its first documentary mention in the Breidenborn Cartulary. By the entry in this book, the municipalities of the Münchweiler Tal (an administrative entity belonging to Hornbach Monastery near Zweibrücken) swore an oath of loyalty to their new lady, Agnes von Neuenbaumberg. The village is, however, roughly 300 years older. Just when the village arose is, however, something that can hardly be determined today. It is only actually known that it existed in 1383.

In another document, for the first time persons from Gries are named, as Stefan Bauer reports in his book about Kübelberg. The date that he names is 10 August 1427, on which day a number of persons donated a plot of land to Johann von Breidenborn. The persons listed thereafter were from several villages, but two of them were Henne vom Grieß (Gries) and his wife Engel. In a 1461 Reichsland border description document, a man named Krich Glaz von Sant Nikolaus von Griß (Gries) is named, which reminds writer Ernst Christmann of a Bildstock near “Klaus Krieg’s” house.

The overlord in the Münchweiler Tal or the Amt of Münchweiler was Hornbach Monastery. This Benedictine monastery, the most important one west of the Rhine and south of the Nahe, did not administer its far-flung holdings all by itself. Rather, it enfeoffed various vassals with them. After the Raugraves of Altenbaumburg and Neuenbaumburg came the Breidenborns, and then the Mauchenheims. Finally, in the 15th century, the Counts of Leyen came into partial, and later full, ownership of Gries and the other villages in the Amt of Münchweiler (Glan-Münchweiler, Nanzweiler, Dietschweiler, Börsborn, Steinbach and Haschbach) through marriage. Jörg von der Leyen wed a daughter from the patriarchal Zweibrücken noble family of Mauchenheim. Since this house had a share in the ownership of Castle Blieskastel, Gries and the other villages in the Amt became part of the Oberamt of Blieskastel, and remained so for roughly 300 years, until the French Revolution.

Through Georg I von der Leyen's marriage to Eva von Mauchenheim in 1456, the House of Leyen came into ownership of holdings in the Bliesgau, and once it had taken charge of an inheritance in 1486, it also acquired ownership of a share in Blieskastel Castle. At the same time, Abbot Ulrich of the Hornbach Monastery granted Jörge von der Leyen, a Burgmann at Castle Lautern, the Münchweiler Tal. Their holdings included Gries and the other villages in the Amt of Münchweiler (Glan-Münchweiler, Nanzweiler, Dietschweiler, Börsborn, Steinbach and Haschbach). The Lords of Leyen came from the country around the lower Moselle and already resided at their castle near Gondorf on the Moselle. For the most part, they served the Archbishops of Trier, and Johann von der Leyen-Saffig was chosen as Archbishop in 1556. Besides the House of Leyen, their kin, the Mauchenheims, were also enfeoffed in turn with shares of the monastery's holdings in the Münchweiler Tal. As of 1533, though, it was only the family of the Barons and later Counts of Leyen.

=== Modern times ===
The overlordship changed hands. It was taken over by the Dukes of Palatinate-Zweibrücken, who until this time had been Lord Protectors of Hornbach Monastery. Thereafter, the monastery itself was slowly forsaken by the monks in the course of the Reformation, until in the end, the last abbot, Johann Kinthausen, went as far as to get married and become Protestant. Because the Leyens retained the old beliefs – that is, Catholicism (after all, the family, whose roots were in Gondorf on the Moselle, had produced several Archbishops of both Trier and Mainz) – religious matters were very problematic, with disputes breaking out several times between them and the Dukes of Palatinate-Zweibrücken, who had embraced Protestantism. Often enough, these disagreements ended up before the Reichskammergericht in either Speyer or Wetzlar. Otherwise, relations between the Catholic House of Leyen and the Calvinist-oriented Duchy of Palatinate-Zweibrücken were generally good.

An exact account of the events during the Thirty Years' War is not known, although obviously the population would have been heavily decimated. Indeed, its utter extinction at that time cannot be ruled out. Names from the time before the war suddenly no longer appear in documents, suggesting that the village was repopulated. During French King Louis XIV's wars of conquest, it is likely that the village was destroyed once again, although this time without the great loss of population. As a result of the Nine Years' War (known in Germany as the Pfälzischer Erbfolgekrieg, or War of the Palatine Succession), the French under King Louis XIV occupied not only the Palatinate territories but also the Palatinate's many microstates, so that they were effectively the authority. For their part, the Dukes of Palatinate-Zweibrücken had married into the Swedish royal family, with their duchy consequently being ruled from Sweden for a time. The oldest map on which Gries appears (compiled in 1564 by the geometer Tilemann Stella), for instance, is to be found at the Swedish Imperial Archive in Stockholm. Over the centuries, the power structure would change often, with only Gries's local lords, the Counts (later Imperial Counts) of Leyen remaining the same, each holding the fief under his respective overlord. Until the French Revolution, the local ruling structure thus did not change again. Gries still belonged to the lordship of the House of Leyen, who as of 1773 resided in Blieskastel, whence they continued to expand their hereditary domain. Glan-Münchweiler became the main centre of a Leyen Unteramt to which Gries also belonged. After Count Franz Karl von der Leyen's death in 1775, his wife Marianne, who was popular among the people, took over the regency for their not yet grown son Philipp.

==== Recent times ====
A few decades after the House of Leyen had moved its main residence from Koblenz to Blieskastel and expanded this town on the Blies in its representative style, French Revolutionary troops came marching in. The feudal structures in Germany, too, were soon swept away. The last countess, who was both legendary and popular, Countess Marianne von der Leyen, managed to flee during the occupation of Blieskastel by French Revolutionary troops in 1793, seeking refuge first in Koblenz with the local people's support, and later by way of Karlsberg Castle and Glan-Münchweiler to kin in Frankfurt in the Grand Duchy of Hesse over on the Rhine’s right bank. Under Emperor Napoleon’s rule, the House of Leyen got its personal property back. Under French rule after 1801, Gries lay in the Department of Sarre, whose seat was at Trier, in the Arrondissement of Saarbrücken, in the Canton of Waldmohr and in the Mairie (“Mayoralty”) of Miesau. The French Empire lasted until Napoleon’s final defeat at the Battle of Waterloo (18 June 1815). By 1814, though, the French had already withdrawn from the German lands on the Rhine’s left bank. After a transitional time, the Rhine District (Rheinkreis) was founded, but later called Pfalz in the Kingdom of Bavaria, which had acquired these lands under the terms laid out by the Congress of Vienna. Under these terms, the Palatinate had passed in the end to Bavaria after several intermediate phases – for example, a time under the Imperial and Royal Austrian and Royal Bavarian State Administration Commission (Kaiserliche und königliche österreichische und königliche bairische Landesadministrationskommision). The administrative entities that had by that time arisen were renewed. Within the Kingdom of Bavaria, Gries belonged to the Bürgermeisterei (“Mayoralty”) of Schönenberg, the Canton of Waldmohr and the Landkommissariat (later Bezirksamt and Landkreis – district) of Homburg (then in the Palatinate, today in the Saarland) in the Rheinkreis. The Homburg district's first supreme leader was Philipp Jakob Siebenpfeiffer. At that time still a loyal supporter of the Bavarian king (all of whom were descendants of the Palatine Wittelsbachs, after all; the Bavarian cousins had died out in the mid 18th century), he was in 1832 one of the main initiators of the Hambach Festival, the most important demonstration for democracy – albeit disguised as a folk festival – in Vormärz Germany.

In 1848, the municipalities of Sand and Gries split away from the Bürgermeisterei (“Mayoralty”) of Schönenberg, and until 1954 stood as a single municipality in their own right. Until 1920, Gries was part of the Bezirksamt of Homburg, as the State Commissariat was later called. Then, in 1919, the harmonious administrative structure was disrupted by a new line drawn right through its middle. After the First World War, the Treaty of Versailles stipulated, among other things, that 26 of the Sankt Wendel district's 94 municipalities had to be ceded to the British- and French-occupied Saar. The remaining 68 municipalities then bore the designation “Restkreis St. Wendel-Baumholder”, with the first syllable of Restkreis having the same meaning as in English, in the sense of “left over”. Gries was left in Weimar Germany, while the coalmines and ironworking industry, in which the majority of workers in Gries had been earning their livelihoods, suddenly found themselves on the other side of the Treaty line. Even the regional seat of Homburg was grouped into this new Saarland. The canton of Waldmohr was likewise split, like the whole Bezirksamt. Even the Bürgermeisterei of Waldmohr with Waldmohr and Jägersburg was torn asunder. Gries belonged with an administrative outpost to the Bezirksamt of Kusel, which existed until 1940. Beginning then, the former Canton of Waldmohr was also administered from Kusel. Thus, Gries now lay within the district of Kusel. After the Second World War, the state of Rhineland-Palatinate was founded, Gries ceased to be part of Bavaria and its 8th Regierungsbezirk and it then belonged to the Bezirksamt of Kusel. However, even today, relations between Gries and Homburg are better developed than those with the current district seat, Kusel, not least of all because most workers from Gries commute to jobs in Homburg, and this even though Kusel lies no farther away than Homburg. The merged administration with Sand ended in 1954. Sand became part of the municipal administration of Schönenberg, while Gries remained an independent municipality (and has ever since). Until administrative restructuring in Rhineland-Palatinate in 1968, Gries had its own mayoral office. As a result of this reform, Gries became a self-administering Ortsgemeinde in the Verbandsgemeinde of Schönenberg-Kübelberg. The arrangement went into force in 1972. In 1978, work was completed on the Ohmbachsee, a reservoir on the Ohmbach on the municipality's southern limit. Beginning in 1972, large new-building areas were opened up, and as recently as 2011, yet another one was to have been ready.

=== Population development ===
Living in the village originally were the descendants of the Frankish settlers, who had taken over the land in the Early Middle Ages. Before the Thirty Years' War, some 50 people lived in the village. After that war, newcomers settled here, some with family names that are still found in Gries to this day. After the Second World War, a great many ethnic Germans from Romania settled in the village, and more recently there have been other ethnic Germans from Kazakhstan. Until the 19th century, almost everybody living in the village earned his livelihood at agriculture, whereas today, Gries has only one full-time agricultural operation. Roughly one hundred years ago, working men began seeking work outside the village, mainly in the Saarland's mines and ironworks. Today's villagers represent the most varied of occupations, and most must commute to jobs elsewhere. Gries's attractive location and cultural life have made it a sought-after residential community, leading to a rise in population, especially as houses were being built in the extensive new building zones. While the village had a mere 400 or so inhabitants in the early 19th century, it was even then already one of the biggest villages in the area by population. Each century thereafter, the population has roughly doubled. Stagnant growth seems to have set in recently, however, at a level of about 1,150. Two hundred years ago, two thirds of the villagers were Protestant and one third Catholic. Since then, the Catholics’ share of the population has shrunk to about one fourth.

The following table shows population development since Napoleonic times for Gries, with some figures broken down by religious denomination:

Year	1825	1871	1905	1939	1961	2000	2003
Total	465	541	603	783	926	1,130	1,135
Catholic	109				174
Evangelical	356				737
Other	–				15

=== Municipality’s name ===
Zum Gries was originally a rural cadastral name, hinting at gritty (Grieß – pronounced the same way as “Gries” – means “grit” in German, and is cognate with that English word) or sandy earth, making it comparable to the formation of a neighbouring place's name: Sand (which is also German for “sand”). The village of Gries therefore arose on a field with sandy soil. The old form of the name matched the current spelling of the common German noun, Grieß, with an “ß”, even in the 1383 first documentary mention and almost all subsequent important historical documents, although the form Griß also sometimes cropped up. The current spelling seems to have first arisen in an 1824 listing of all places in the Bavarian Rhenish District (that is, the Bavarian Rhenish Palatinate).

=== Vanished villages ===
There might once have been a self-administering village where the Lebecksmühle now stands.

== Religion ==
Gries belonged, as did all the villages in the Münchweiler Valley from the Middle Ages onwards to the Church of Glan-Münchweiler. In the time of the Reformation, the inhabitants of Gries, along with everybody else in the parish, had to adopt Martin Luther’s teachings at their rulers’ behest. To be borne in mind here is that at first, the House of Leyen (the lords) usually deferred to any decisions on matters of religion made by the County Palatine of Zweibrücken (the overlords). However, when Duke Johannes I decreed in 1588 that all his subjects had to convert to the Calvinist Reformed faith, the House of Leyen opposed the new faith's introduction into the domains over which they held sway. Nevertheless, even the Lutherans in the Leyen domains were administered from Zweibrücken. After the 1648 conclusion of the Thirty Years' War, there was, under the law, freedom of religion. Among the newcomers who came to settle the depleted village at that time was a few Catholics. Further Catholics settled the area as a result of the re-population efforts during French King Louis XIV's wars of conquest. The Counts of Leyen, who were Catholic themselves, also promoted the Catholic faith. Under Napoleonic rule and during Bavarian times thereafter, there was an ecclesiastical reorganization. Thus, as early as 1803, Gries's Catholics passed to the Church of Kübelberg, and the Protestants were grouped into the Church Community of Obermiesau in 1823. Within the Church Community of Kübelberg, a new church came into being for the villages of Miesau, Elschbach and Gries; it was built in Elschbach. In 1964, the village's Protestants consecrated their own new church in the village. The striking building is distinguished by having an octagonal nave and an unconventional 39 m-tall, pointed steeple. One of the bells in this tower, which newcomers brought with them to their new homeland, comes from Badeutz-Milleschutz (Bădeuți-Milișăuți) in Romania. The Catholics built a youth centre, which was dedicated in 1970, and church services are held there. Today, Gries's Protestants belong, as before, to the Church Community of Miesau and the Deaconry of Kusel (until 1980 the Deaconry of Homburg). The Catholics belong within the Catholic Deaconry of Kusel to the Pastoral Assembly of Kübelberg, whose seat is in Brücken.

== Politics ==
=== Municipal council ===
The council is made up of 16 council members, who were elected by proportional representation at the municipal election held on 7 June 2009, and the honorary mayor as chairman.

The municipal election held on 7 June 2009 yielded the following results:

Year	SPD	FWG	Total
2009	9	7	16 seats
2004	7	9	16 seats

“FWG” is the “Free Voters’ Group of Rhineland-Palatinate”.

=== Mayors ===
- 1848–1874 Jakob Pflüger, Sand
- 1874–1887 Nikolaus Ulrich, Sand
- 1887–1918 Philipp Vollmar
- 1918–1933 Jakob Christmann
- 1933–1937 Ernst Gortner (NSDAP)
- 1937–1939 Ernst Scheck (NSDAP)
- 1939–1945 Otto Fuhrmann (NSDAP)
- 1945 Reinhard Rubly, Sand
- 1946 August Bauer, Sand
- 1946 Eduard Müller, Sand
- 1946–1947 Eduard Spieß, Sand
- 1947–1952 August Bauer, Sand
- 1953–1967 Karl Kallenbach (Kallenbach Karl voters’ group)
- 1967–1977 Eugen Bernd (SPD)
- 1977–1999 Ludwig Jung (SPD)
- 1999–2004 Gunther Jung, (SPD)
- 2004–2009 Manfred Perschke, (“Bürgernah” free voters’ group)
- 2009–2014 Gerd Heinz (SPD)
- 2014– Olaf Klein (SPD)

Gries's mayor is Olaf Klein, re-elected in 2019.

=== Coat of arms ===
The municipality's arms might be described thus: Per pale Or issuant from base an abbot's staff gules and azure a pale argent.

The charge on the dexter (armsbearer's right, viewer's left) side, the abbot's staff, is a reference to the village's former allegiance to the old Hornbach Monastery. The composition on the sinister (armsbearer's left, viewer's right) side is drawn from the arms formerly borne by the House of Leyen, who were once lords in Gries. The arms have been borne since 1984 when they were approved by the now defunct Rheinhessen-Pfalz Regierungsbezirk administration in Neustadt an der Weinstraße.

=== Town partnerships ===
Gries fosters partnerships with the following places:

- Gries, Bas-Rhin, France since 20 May 1979.

This other Gries lies in the north of Alsace about 6 km from Haguenau and 12 km from Strasbourg. Since the 1979 establishment of the partnership, it has been well developed. The relatively short distance between Gries and Gries – only about 110 km – has made private contacts easy. Even a Palatine-Alsatian marriage, complete with children, has sprung from this partnership. There are regular visits back and forth by each municipality's councils.

== Culture and sightseeing ==
=== Regular events ===
As a nascent tourist destination, Gries has a series of festivals, the foremost among which is the kermis (church consecration festival, locally known as the Kerb), which since 1950 has been held on the last weekend in August, complete with a parade, the hanging of the garlands, the kermis speech, dancing events, the Frühschoppen (roughly “morning half-pint”) and the burial of the kermis. Before 1950, this village festival was held in the rather inhospitable month of November. Among the newer festivals, the Seefest (“Lake Festival”) is particularly worthy of mention. It enjoys great popularity among visitors from both near and far, even from abroad, not least of all those from Alsace. Other customs, mainly for children, such as Shrovetide (locally Fastnacht), Walpurgis Night (locally Hexen in der Mainacht, or “Witches on May Day Eve”), the Pfingstquack (see the Blaubach and Dennweiler-Frohnbach articles for an explanation of this custom, and also this German-language external link) and the Saint Martin's Day parade, among others, largely correspond with those observed in other villages.

=== Clubs ===
Gries has a lively club life. The biggest clubs are the music and singing club and the gymnastic and sport club. Over time, some clubs have been forsaken. The workers’ singing club, the miners’ association, the rabbit-breeding club, the “Edelweiß” cycling club, the Ulk society, the club for convivial conversation and the goat-raising club have all passed into history. Clubs that are still active in the village are as follows:

- Arbeiterwohlfahrt — workers’ welfare
- Bauern- und Winzerschaft — farmers’ and winemakers’ association
- DRK-Ortsverein — German Red Cross local chapter
- Fan-Club Rote Teufel — “Red Devils” fan club
- Förderverein der Freiwilligen Feuerwehr — volunteer fire brigade promotional association
- Förderverein der Kirchenorgel — church organ promotional association
- Mackenbacher
- Obst- und Gartenbauverein — fruitgrowing and gardening club
- Pensionärs- und Unterhaltungsverein — pensioners’ and conversation club
- Pfälzerwald-Verein — “Palatinate Forest” hiking club
- Sangesschwestern — “singing sisters”
- SPD-Ortsverein — SPD local chapter
- VdK — advocacy group
- Verein der Landfrauen — countrywomen's club
- Verein der Straußbuben — “garland lads’ club” (relates to the kermis)

== Economy and infrastructure ==
=== Economic structure ===
In days of yore, the then farming village of Gries knew only the occupations that any place thus characterized needed, namely the crafts: blacksmith, cabinetmaker, tailor, shoemaker. There was also an inn. Then the Lebecksmühle (mill) became part of Gries; this was named the “Wolfsmühle” in 1712 after it was inherited by a Mr. Wolf. It is likely that the mill is much older, although an exact age cannot be determined. Later in the 18th century, the mill passed to the family Lebeck, who gave it the name that is still customary today. As early as the late 19th century, the mill was shut down; it later served as a countryside pub. Shops that did not necessarily have anything to do with agriculture began arising in the early 20th century: a roofing business, a butcher’s shop, painting businesses, hairdresser's shops, grocer’s shops, a bakery, a bicycle and motorcycle shop and more inns. As mentioned above, people from Gries were then already commuting to work in the Saarland. Among the bigger businesses that arose in the village itself in the 1920s and 1930s, though, were a few diamond-cutting shops on the pattern of the diamond-cutting village of Brücken, which also enjoyed a brief second boom after the Second World War, but this did not last beyond 1950. The shops and crafts that were once customary in all villages have largely disappeared. Other businesses have taken their place, and today, the following shops, craft workshops and institutions are to be found in Gries: a business dealing in heating system and bathroom installation, a flooring business, a roofing business, an excavation business, a painter’s workshop, a tile layer’s workshop, an architecture office, an institution for foot care and a Heilpraktiker. The inn industry has gained new importance with Gries’s emergence as a tourism centre.

=== Education ===
Schooling was promoted by the Electors even in the smallest villages after the Reformation, for it was believed that adult Christians should be able to read the Bible. Schools founded as early as the 16th century and the early 17th century were as a rule forced to shut down during the dire events of the Thirty Years' War. In Gries, school was held in 1663 by a clergyman, although likely not in a proper schoolhouse, but rather at somebody’s house or at the rectory. In 1750, there was supposedly a Lutheran school in Gries that was also attended by schoolchildren from neighbouring villages. Further particulars about schooling during the 18th century are apparently unknown. It is certain, though, that the village’s first schoolhouse was built in a citizens’ building bee in 1827 on Friedhofstraße. The building still stands, and after many conversions, it is used nowadays as a private house. Until 1964, the building was also the location of the mayor's office. A newer schoolhouse, which is also preserved and which is now used as a community centre and clubhouse, was built in 1877 on Triftstraße with two classrooms on separate floors and with a belltower. The building had to be expanded in 1938 when the eighth level was introduced. During the Second World War, Siegfried Line workers moved into the building, leading to heavy damage to the furniture. In 1968, the municipality had the belltower, which was falling into disrepair, torn down. The bell, from Bukovina, thereafter hung on a wooden frame that stood in the schoolyard. In general, the villagers were satisfied with Gries's teachers. In the course of the general restructuring of the school system beginning in 1968, the local school was gradually dissolved by 1975, although for a few years thereafter the schoolhouse was provisionally used by the central school in Schönenberg-Kübelberg. Today, primary school pupils attend the school responsible for them in Kübelberg, while Hauptschule students attend the “Erich-Kästner-Schule im Kohlbachtal-Schönenberg-Kübelberg”. This Regionale Schule also has a Realschule branch.

=== Transport ===
Even though the great highways are easy to reach from Gries, the village itself does not lie on the long-distance roads, ensuring very light traffic. Kreisstraße 8 from Steinbach am Glan to Miesau leads through Gries. Within the village, Kreisstraße 9 branches off to Schönenberg-Kübelberg and Bundesstraße 423. Nor is it far to Bundesstraße 40, only a few kilometres. Southeast of Gries runs the Autobahn A 6 (Saarbrücken–Mannheim), and to the northeast is the Autobahn A 62 (Kaiserslautern–Trier). Autobahn interchanges are to be found in Bruchmühlbach-Miesau (no. 11, some 10 km away) and between Waldmohr and Homburg-Bruchhof, both serving the A 6. There is a further Autobahn interchange (no. 8, some 12 km away) near Glan-Münchweiler on the A 62.

Serving nearby Glan-Münchweiler is Glan-Münchweiler station on the Landstuhl–Kusel railway. There are hourly trains at this station throughout the day, namely Regionalbahn service RB 67 between Kaiserslautern and Kusel, named Glantalbahn after a former railway line that shared a stretch of its tracks with the Landstuhl–Kusel railway, including the former junction at Glan-Münchweiler. The nearest railway station, however, is the one in Bruchmühlbach-Miesau, 6 km away, and the most heavily used one locally is Homburg Central Station, which has ICE connections.
