= Nanzdietschweiler =

- Municipality
- Coat of arms

- Location of Nanzdietschweiler within Kusel district
- Interactive map of Nanzdietschweiler
- Location within Germany Location within Rhineland-Palatinate
- Coordinates: 49°26′37″N 7°26′26″E
- Country: Germany
- State: Rhineland-Palatinate
- District: Kusel
- Municipal assoc.: Oberes Glantal
- Subdivisions: 3

Government
  - Mayor (2019–24): Annette Filipiak-Bender (CDU)

Area
  - Total: 9.81 km^{2} (3.79 sq mi)
- Elevation: 220–250 m (720–820 ft)

Population (2025-12-31)
  - Total: 1,104
  - Density: 113/km^{2} (291/sq mi)
- Time zone: UTC+01:00 (CET)
  - Summer (DST): UTC+02:00 (CEST)
- Postal codes: 66909
- Dialling codes: 06383
- Vehicle registration: KUS
- Website: www.nanzdietschweiler.de

Nanzdietschweiler (German pronunciation: [ˈnantsdiːtʃˌvaɪlɐ]) is an Ortsgemeinde – a municipality belonging to a Verbandsgemeinde, a kind of collective municipality – in the Kusel district in Rhineland-Palatinate, Germany. It belongs to the Verbandsgemeinde of Oberes Glantal.

== Geography ==
=== Location ===
Nanzdietschweiler lies in the upper Glan valley where the Landstuhler Bruch (a depression) meets the North Palatine Uplands. The village's elevation ranges from 220 m to 250 m above sea level. The municipality's highest peaks reach 384 m above sea level. The municipal area is characterized by woodland, meadows and the species-rich river Glan, which flows through, among other things, the “Heimerbrühl” bird conservation area. Nanzdietschweiler is the biggest municipality in the Verbandsgemeinde by land area, and ranks second in population after Herschweiler-Pettersheim. Nanzdietschweiler arose out of the three centres of Dietschweiler, Nanzweiler and Nanzdiezweiler, each of whose locations is well defined. Dietschweiler lies on the Glan's left bank in the dale's upper reaches, mainly on three streets in the area of two small brooks, the Ochsenbach and the Lützelbach, which empty into the Glan. On the hill northwest of this centre lies the Lützelbacherhof, an Aussiedlerhof (post-war agricultural community). Nanzweiler stretches just under a kilometre farther north on the Glan's left bank, with a settlement concentrated at the riverbank, a linear settlement in the Atzelbach valley and most prominently a settlement on the rise between this brook and the Glan towards the south. Nanzdiezweiler lies on the Glan's right bank across the river from Nanzweiler as an enclosed clump village north of the Maulschbach, which empties here into the Glan. A smaller part lying farther south stands across the river from Dietschweiler. On the floor of the valley, the village lies some 220 m above sea level. The mountains on the Glan's left bank reach heights of more than 350 m above sea level (Gardelstein 366 m, Rosengarten 384 m), while those over on the right bank generally are not quite as high as 350 m above sea level.

=== Neighbouring municipalities ===
Nanzdietschweiler borders in the north on the municipality of Glan-Münchweiler, in the northeast on the municipality of Niedermohr, in the southeast on the municipality of Hütschenhausen, in the southwest on the municipality of Gries and in the west on the municipality of Börsborn.

=== Constituent communities ===
Nanzdietschweiler's Ortsteile are Nanzweiler, Dietschweiler, Nanzdietzweiler and Kreuz, although the last named is usually grouped with Dietschweiler. Nanzdietschweiler was formed on 10 January 1969 (with effect from 7 June 1969) out of these centres. Nanzweiler, Dietschweiler and Nanzdiezweiler were once separate municipalities. Kreuz was part of the makeup, too, but was counted as part of Dietschweiler even then. The municipal limit ran along the Glan (Nanzweiler/Nanzdiezweiler) and over the heights at what is now the sporting ground (Nanzweiler/Dietschweiler). The centre of Kreuz with its old gristmill (the Dietschweiler Mühle), on the other hand, was an exception. It lay on the Glan's right bank (Nanzdiezweiler), but was nevertheless considered part of Dietschweiler. Also belonging to Nanzdietschweiler is the outlying homestead of Lützelbacherhof.

=== Municipality’s layout ===
Nanzdietschweiler has several centres. The centre called Dietschweiler is concentrated mainly in the area between the Ochsenbach and the Lützelbach, where it is characterized to a great extent by old farmhouses, these being either Einfirsthäuser (houses with a single roof ridge, which are typical of the Westrich, an historic region that encompasses areas in both Germany and France) or Quereinhäuser (combination residential and commercial houses divided for these two purposes down the middle, perpendicularly to the street). Standing in Dietschweiler's south end are the Evangelical church and the former Dietschweiler railway station. The older part of Nanzweiler lies on the Glan, whereas the settled area in the Atzeltal (dale) mostly arose only after the Second World War. In the upper part of the village between the Atzelbach and the Glan stands Sacred Heart Catholic Church (Herz-Jesu-Kirche) with its rectory and youth hall. Nanzdiezweiler on the Glan's right bank is made up in its north end mainly of building development on the slopes east of the Glan, while it also has a settled centre to the south lying on the opposite bank to the formerly self-administering village of Dietschweiler, which is also known as Kreuz (“Cross”). This could have been a name for an old village. This is also where the old mill stands, in Kreuz's south end on the Glan's right bank. A great sporting ground with a multipurpose hall (the Kurpfalzhalle, or “Electoral Palatinate Hall”) and an open-air stage stretches between the centres of Nanzweiler and Dietschweiler. Once standing in each of the centres was a schoolhouse, of which only the one in Dietschweiler still serves its original purpose.

== History ==
=== Antiquity ===
As early as the New Stone Age, the area around what is now Nanzdietschweiler was populated by man, bearing witness to which are various archaeological finds, among which have been a few stone hatchets, made out of hard stone. A barrow on the Rosengarten (which despite its name, meaning “rose garden”, is a mountain), which belongs to a group of others across the municipal limit in Glan-Münchweiler, comes from the Iron Age, as does a small ringwall commonly known as the Schwedenwall (“Sweden Wall” or “Swedish Wall”). Roman finds, too, have come to light within Nanzdietschweiler's limits, such as coins. Historian Karlwerner Kaiser had this to say about monuments to gods that have been unearthed: “Likewise, remnants of god memorials bear witness to the populace’s appearance on the landscape, as with the broken piece of what is believed to be a monument to the great earth-mother Diana and with the matronal monument at the Lichtenstangen (a named rural cadastral area) on the south slope southwest of Nanzweiler. Its front side shows three seated goddesses with fruit baskets in their laps. The remaining Celtic populace’s local gods, wearing Roman clothes, confront them. Particular attention is earned by the relief of a saddled horse on the far side of the matronal stone, which might have stood in a temple.”

=== Middle Ages ===
The villages of Nanzweiler and Dietschweiler arose in the Free Imperial Domain (Reichsland) when this stretched broadly over what is now the West Palatinate. From this contiguous block of territory, kings split off certain pieces to make of them donations to both ecclesiastical and secular lordships. Great parts passed into the Salians’ ownership. In 737, Count Werner I of the Salian House endowed the Hornbach Monastery, whose first abbot was Saint Pirmin. This monastery was richly furnished with estates, even with the Münchweiler Tal (dale), which had been split off the Reichsland and given into Count Werner's ownership, whereupon he then gave it to the monastery. The villages of Nanzweiler and Dietschweiler already existed at the time of this donation on each side of the Glan. Laid down as the border of the monasterial landhold in the Münchweiler Tal was the river Glan in the area of what is now the village of Nanzdietschweiler. The centres on the right bank remained in the Reichsland whereas the parts on the left bank passed into the monastery's ownership. Throughout this period in history, the villages each side of the Glan, which then even bore the same names, were set asunder by this border. Nanzweiler and Dietschweiler on the Glan's right bank, which became Nanzdiezweiler by the 19th century, remained in Imperially immediate ownership and over the course of the centuries was pledged several times, in the 14th century to the Electorate of Trier, and in the 15th to Electoral Palatinate. Both villages on the right bank then remained with Electoral Palatinate, thereby sharing a history with the region around Kaiserslautern, generally known as the Reichswald (“Imperial Forest”). An utterly different course was taken by the two villages on the Glan's left bank. As a fief of the Hornbach Monastery whose hub was at Glan-Münchweiler, they passed in the 14th century (1323) first to the Raugraves in the Nahegau, then to the Archbishop of Trier (1344) and to Breidenborn (1383), finally ending up in the 16th century with the Counts of Leyen. In 1350, the Ortsteil of Nanzweiler had its first documentary mention as Nanczvilre, while Nanzdiezweiler was first mentioned in 1437 as Diezwiler and Dietschweiler in 1477 as Dyzweiler. On 17 March 1383, the village of Monchwilr off dem Glan was pledged along with all its appurtenances (and under feudalism this, of course, included the people) for 340 Rhenish guilders to Sir Bechtolff von Flörsheim (Flerßheim), Squire Philips von Breidenborn and their heirs – with the exception, however, of the mountain at Nancwilr. On the same day, however, the agreement seems to have been amended to include this mountain, even mentioning it specifically, and accordingly the monetary amount involved was raised to 480 Rhenish guilders. Less than a month later, on 12 April 1383, another record mentions several people, including three from Nanzweiler (Henne von Nancwilr, Clas von Nancwilr and Henne, Angnesen Sohn) who had sworn an oath of obeisance to Sir Bechtolff, Castle Count at Lutern (Kaiserslautern), Squire Philips and their heirs.

=== 18th Century ===
Until the time of the French Revolution nothing about the existing lordship structure on either side of the Glan changed. Nanzweiler and Diezweiler on the right bank remained with Electoral Palatinate, and the like-named villages on the Glan's left bank remained House of Leyen landholds. The Lords of Leyen, who at first maintained their lordly residence at Koblenz, moved their residence to Blieskastel in 1773.

The Münchweiler Tal was only part of the lordly holdings, with the ancestral castle standing on the Moselle and other holdings widely scattered. Between the House of Leyen and Electoral Palatinate there were tight relations, as there also were in the Late Middle Ages between the Lords of Breidenborn and Electoral Palatinate. Any antagonisms between the villages on each side of the border were thus never very great. All four villages were very small. In 1600, there were 15 hearths (for which read “households” or “families”) in what is now Nanzdietschweiler, three in the villages on the right bank that later became Nanzdiezweiler and in Dietschweiler and Nanzweiler on the Glan's left bank 12 all together. Between 1618 and 1648, however, namely during the Thirty Years' War, Nanzdietschweiler was empty of people. In all the villages at the end of the war, almost nobody lived anymore. Even as late as 1684 (36 years after the war's end), still no settlers had come to the villages on the right bank to repopulate them, but that changed beginning in this year. So many new settlers came, though, and the population grew so quickly that by the mid 18th century, some inhabitants were leaving, emigrating to places such as Eastern and Southern Europe, and even the New World seeking a new homeland. This emigration from these as yet ununified villages reached a peak in 1784, with migrants reaching Hungary, the Balkans and Poland.

In 1787, Nanzdiezweiler had 141 inhabitants. After the French Revolution broke out, the old lordships on the Rhine’s left bank quickly collapsed, even Electoral Palatinate, and the rather small lordship of the House of Leyen. From very late feudal times (1788) comes the following report about the part of the municipality later known as Nanzdiezweiler: “Diez- and Nanzweiler are actually two doubled little villages or hamlets. For only what lies on the Glan’s left side belongs to the court (that is, Ramstein); the rest, however, on the right side to the Counts of Leyen. Both are two and a half hours away northwestwards from Ramstein. They lie next to each other and make up one community.

Above Nanzweiler, the Maulsbach, which flows out of the Schönauerwog, runs between both hamlets down the Wiesenthal (valley), and falls into the river Glan, which flows by westwards and drives a gristmill near Diezweiler. The subjects in both hamlets are made up of 38 families and 141 souls, the buildings of 22 private houses and 2 civic ones and the municipal area of 619 Morgen of cropland, 156 Morgen of meadows, 7 Morgen of gardens and 51 Morgen of woodland. These woods belong to the subjects, and are under the Ramstein forest watch. The Catholic inhabitants go to church in Kirchmohr, but the Reformed and Lutherans go to Steinwenden. Of the tithes, the Electoral Court Chamber draws two thirds and the Lutheran pastor at Deisberg am Glan draws the rest.” It should be borne in mind here that the 18th-century chronicler has transposed left and right when referring to the river Glan's sides.

==== Overview through the 19th century ====
- 14 July 1789 with the Storming of the Bastille came the outbreak of the French Revolution, which would soon affect Germany.
- 20 April 1792 France declared war on Austria.
- 15 May 1793 the French marched into Blieskastel.
- 27 July 1793 the French burnt Karlsberg Castle near Homburg and began thrusting into the Glan valley, taking the German lands on the Rhine’s left bank over bit by bit for France.
- 1794 when Prussian troops were in the Kusel area, the farmers from the Sickingen Heights drove their livestock before the French advance to Dietschweiler and Nanzweiler.
- 26 July 1794, Kusel was burnt down.
- 5 April 1795 came the Peace of Basel, under whose terms Prussia recognized France’s annexation of the lands on the Rhine’s left bank.
- 17 October 1797, Austria, too, agreed to this deed under the terms of the Treaty of Campo Formio.
- 9 February 1801, a further agreement, the Treaty of Lunéville, made the cession of these lands to France permanent. The annexation to the French Republic also brought its attendant new territorial order. Merely by chance, the villages each side of the Glan that now make up Nanzdietschweiler remained asunder, for the river now formed the boundary between the Departments of Mont-Tonnerre (or Donnersberg in German) and Sarre. Dietschweiler and Nanzweiler on the left bank now belonged to the Mairie (“Mayoralty”) of Glan-Münchweiler, the Canton of Waldmohr, the Arrondissement of Saarbrücken and the Department of Sarre, while the centres that later became Nanzdiezweiler on the right bank found themselves in the Mairie of Obermohr (later Niedermohr), the Canton of Landstuhl, the Arrondissement of Zweibrücken and the Department of Donnersberg.
- 1802 Nanzdietschweiler had 518 inhabitants (225 in Dietschweiler, 140 in Nanzweiler and 153 in Nanzdiezweiler). Napoleon’s fortunes in Germany were dealt a blow in October 1813 with his defeat at the Battle of Leipzig (also called the Battle of the Nations). Less than a year later, the French were driven out of the country and the Palatinate was no longer under French rule, a deed made official under the Treaty of Paris on 30 May 1814. By that time, the Congress of Vienna had already decided two days earlier that the Palatinate should be annexed to the Kingdom of Bavaria.

After a transitional period, the Congress of Vienna established the Baierischer Rheinkreis, later known as the Rheinpfalz (Rhenish Palatinate), a newly formed exclave of the Kingdom of Bavaria. Even then, the centres either side of the Glan remained administratively split. Nanzdiezweiler, which now had its current name, belonged at first to the Bürgermeisterei (“Mayoralty”) of Steinwenden, and then later to the Bürgermeisterei of Niedermohr in the Canton of Landstuhl, whereas the villages of Dietschweiler and Nanzweiler on the Glan's left bank belonged to the Bürgermeisterei of Glan-Münchweiler in the Canton of Waldmohr and the Landkommissariat of Homburg. The cantons (Kantone) were later called districts (Distrikte), but lost their importance and were thus eventually dissolved. The Landkommissariate became Bezirksämter, and then Landkreise or “districts”.

In 1824, there were 154 hearths (for which read “households”) in what is now Nanzdietschweiler, 53 in Nanzdiezweiler and in Dietschweiler and Nanzweiler 101 all together. That same year, a schoolhouse was built in Dietschweiler, as was another in Nanzweiler. Another one followed in 1868 in Nanzdiezweiler. In 1836/1837, Nanzdietschweiler had 853 inhabitants (287 in Dietschweiler, 222 in Nanzweiler and 344 in Nanzdiezweiler).

=== 20th Century ===
The 20th century brought along with it the railway. The line from Glan-Münchweiler to Homburg was dedicated on 1 May 1904. It also brought a Catholic church, approval for which was received on 16 January 1908; it received blessing later that same year, on Christmas Eve, from Nanzweiler native Prof. Nikolaus Donauer. On 17 January 1909, the Dietschweiler Protestant Church Building Association was founded. Administrative structures changed again after the First World War when the Treaty of Versailles stipulated, among other things, that Homburg had to be ceded to the British- and French-occupied Saar.

On 22 July 1928, a bell was consecrated at Heart of Jesus Catholic Church (Herz-Jesu-Kirche).The rest of the Homburg district that was then still within Weimar Germany now functioned as a branch of Waldmohr in the Kusel district, and was permanently grouped into the Kusel district in 1940. The Canton of Landstuhl was a branch of the Bezirksamt of Kaiserslautern, but had been fully merged into Kaiserslautern by 1938. In the early 1930s, the Nazi Party (NSDAP) became quite popular in Dietschweiler.

In the 1930 Reichstag elections, only 5.5% of the local votes went to Adolf Hitler’s party, but by the 1932 Reichstag elections, this had grown to 40%. By the time of the 1933 Reichstag elections, after Hitler had already seized power, local support for the Nazis had swollen to 49.4%. This success, however, was not repeated in nearby Nanzweiler, where the respective figures were 2.4%, 19.9% and 18.75% with a hefty 75% majority there going to the Centre Party in 1933, which was also the runner-up in Dietschweiler (36.7%). Nevertheless, Hitler’s overall success in these elections paved the way for his Enabling Act of 1933 (Ermächtigungsgesetz), thus starting the Third Reich in earnest.

On 19 March 1945, American troops – actually tanks – came into Nanzdietschweiler at about six o’clock in the evening that day. The Second World War ended, at least in Europe, on 7/8 May 1945. On 17 October 1954, forty-five years after the Protestant Church Building Association was founded, the Protestant church was consecrated. The first spadeful of earth had been turned on 24 August 1952.

The 1950s also brought infrastructure improvements. In 1955, the local electrical network in Nanzweiler was taken over by Pfalzwerke AG and subsequently modernized. In 1957, the water shortage in the Münchweiler valley was remedied by the Oberes Glantal (“Upper Glan Valley”) group supply facility. The pumping works were near Elschbach, and a supply pipeline ran as far as Rehweiler. The whole system was dedicated with a Wasserfest (“Water Festival”) on 25 August of that year at the Eicherwald water cistern. The festivities were, however, cut short – perhaps ironically – by a rainstorm. That same month, Dietschweiler's first watermain went into operation, putting the local washing brook out of business.

On 9 August 1959, the warriors’ memorial in Nanzweiler was unveiled. A memorial to the fallen was also unveiled in Dietschweiler on 15 November 1964. Nanzdiezweiler's warriors’ memorial was unveiled on 30 October 1966. Sewerage was laid in Nanzweiler in 1966. In 1968, a new bridge was built across the Glan near the old gristmill (the Dietschweiler Mühle). The old three-arch bridge, built in 1845 from sandstone blocks, was replaced with a concrete one. In the course of administrative restructuring in Rhineland-Palatinate in 1968, there was a fundamental change in the administrative structure for all the villages. Nanzdiezweiler was now also grouped into the Kusel district, and on 7 June 1969, the Ortsgemeinde of Nanzdietschweiler was formed out of the until then self-administering municipalities of Dietschweiler, Nanzdiezweiler and Nanzweiler. This deed was carried out under the Fourth Verwaltungsvereinfachungsgesetz (“Administration Simplification Law”) of 10 January 1969.

One year later, on 11 June 1970, Landrat (District Chairman) Held came to the municipality with an entourage of district administration consultants, department heads and the leader of the Kusel Health Office to view the new municipality of Nanzdietschweiler. In 1968/1969, the municipality of Nanzdiezweiler began planning and publicity for a new building area, “Am Kreuzhübel”. Work began in March 1974, and workers began building the first house on 15 November 1974. Also in 1968/1969, the Kreisstraße (District Road) between Nanzdiezweiler and Katzenbach was built. On 18 October 1970, a new peal of bells was consecrated at the Protestant church, and on this occasion, the church itself acquired a name, Saint Martin's (Martinskirche). On 22 April 1972, the new Verbandsgemeinde of Glan-Münchweiler was formed, comprising 14 municipalities, among them Nanzdietschweiler.

Arthur Höring was elected the first Verbandsgemeindemeister on 4 October 1972 and then sworn in and inaugurated in office on 3 November 1972. On 30 April 1972, the newly expanded Catholic church in Nanzweiler was consecrated. Work had begun in June 1969. In May 1973, the firm Edm. Corty & Co. GmbH, Krefeld - New York set up a women's clothing branch plant at the former schoolhouse. The operation was closed on 31 March 1978 with the firm Dobierzin & Co. GmbH taking it over the next day (1 April 1978). Operations only continued, however, until 25 May 1979, when the plant was closed for good.

In March 1976, the new television repeater transmitter on the Hühnerböshöhe went into operation. The total cost for the project, borne by Deutsche Bundespost, was 218,000 DM. On 14 September 1978, a new bridge across the Glan was opened to traffic. The old bridge had been only a wooden footbridge between the two centres with a ford alongside for any vehicles. On 20 March 1980, municipal council adopted a resolution to introduce a municipal coat of arms. Approval to do so was received from the Rheinhessen-Pfalz Regierungsbezirk administration in Neustadt an der Weinstraße on 26 September of that year. Also in 1980, on the night of 16 August, a heavy storm raged over the southern part of the Kusel district, bringing heavy rainfalls and consequent serious flooding. Water on the Nanzdietschweiler sporting ground was so deep that boats could be used on it, and indeed, this was the only way to reach the clubhouse.

On 31 May 1981, service on the railway line from Glan-Münchweiler to Homburg was ended. From 12 to 16 May 1983, the municipality had its 600-year jubilee of first documentary mention, which was celebrated with a district local history day. Nobody knew at this time that there was an earlier documentary mention of the municipality. In 1985, Nanzdietschweiler forged a partnership with the Alsatian municipality of Bütten (German spelling) or Butten (French spelling). There were also plans for another new building area, “Auf der Höllenhub”. In 1989, a new sewage treatment plant was built. In 1996 a new fire brigade equipment house was built. On the occasion of the 625-year jubilee of first documentary mention in December 2008, Mr. Roland Paul, head of the Institute for Palatine History and Folklore (Institut für pfälzische Geschichte und Volkskunde) reported that a document about Nanzdietschweiler from 1350 had been discovered in the Munich State Archive. Until this time, Nanzdietschweiler's first documentary mention had been thought to date from 1383, but this new discovery pushed the municipality's written history back by 33 years.

=== Population development ===
Well into the 20th century, the greater part of Nanzdietschweiler's inhabitants earned their living at agriculture. Besides farmers, there were the craftsmen that were customary in a bigger village who only worked the land as a secondary occupation, or for their own needs. There were hardly any jobs to be had in factories. There were a few travelling musicians (see the Hinzweiler article for more information about the Wandermusikanten). Since farming nowadays, even with roughly the same land area that it has always had, cannot offer very many people jobs, many workers must now commute to Kaiserslautern, Homburg, Waldmohr, Kusel and elsewhere. Insofar as the inhabitants still keep the Christian faith today, more than half are Catholic and more than one third are Evangelical. During the early 19th century, a few Jews lived in what is now Nanzdietschweiler, mainly in Nanzweiler. Even into the 18th century, all the villages were very small, and only towards the end of that century did the population figures rise healthily. In the 19th century, continuous growth can be noted, holding steady until the Second World War. Today, the combined total population for all villages is shrinking. However, given the good transport links, the expansion of tourism and good opportunities for industrialization, a new rise in the figures is possible in the future.

The following table shows population development from the time of the Congress of Vienna to the early 21st century for Nanzdietschweiler, with some figures broken down by religious denomination, and most figures for the time before the merger broken down into figures for separate centres:

Year	1815	1825	1835	1871	1905	1939	1950	1961	1970	1980	1985	1990	1995	1998	2000	2005	2007
Dietschweiler		300	287	289	315	317		363
Catholic		136						152
Evangelical		164						211
Nanzweiler		207	222	225	280	414		464
Catholic		155						371
Evangelical		45						93
Jewish		7						–
Nanzdietzweiler		267	344	355	350	459		595
Catholic		101						331
Evangelical		166						263
Total	687	774	853	869	945	1,190	1,338	1,422	1,440	1,233	1,222	1,276	1,352	1,382	1,300	1,268	1,259

=== Municipality’s names ===
The municipality's current name, Nanzdietschweiler, is to be taken as an amalgam of what are historically two names applied to four villages that all lay right near each other. Originally, it was only two villages, Nanzweiler and Dietschweiler, each of which spread out on both sides of the Glan. During the High Middle Ages, the parts either side of the river were split apart by a border drawn along the river, with the parts on the left bank belonging to the Münchweiler monasterial landhold and those on the right bank belonging to the Free Imperial Domain (Reichsland), and later Electoral Palatinate. Thus arose two pairs of self-administering villages either side of the Glan, each bearing the same name as its counterpart over the other side. Only in Bavarian times in the 19th century were the two centres on the right bank merged under the name Nanzdiezweiler. To be borne in mind here is that Diezweiler is an older form of the name Dietschweiler. The municipality's current name, Nanzdietschweiler, was coined in 1968, arising along with the territorial and administrative reform that was then ongoing, and under which, these three (originally four) villages were merged into one municipality. All the historical village names in question have the common German placename ending —weiler, which as a standalone word means “hamlet” (originally “homestead”), to which was prefixed either Diezo in Dietschweiler's case, or Nando or Nanzo in Nanzweiler's case, each believed to have arisen from a personal name. Thus, it is believed that Dietschweiler was originally “Diezo’s Homestead”, although it is difficult to determine today just when the village was founded. Dietschweiler had its first documentary mention in an original document in 1465 as Dyetzwiller. Later forms of the name that the village bore were Diezwiller (1477), Dutschwiller (1563) and Ditzweyller (1726). Likewise, the name Nanzweiler is believed originally to have meant “Nando’s (or Nanzo’s) Homestead”. The name is often likened to that borne by a count named Nanthar of the Guideschi (Widonen in German). Nanzweiler had its first documentary mention in 1350 as Nantzvilre. This document was newly discovered in 2008. A further newly discovered – but not quite as old – document also mentioned somebody named Sifrit von Nanzewilre in 1364. Both these newer discoveries are original documents. Until the older of those two came to light, the village's first documentary mention, as Nanczvilre, was thought to be a record from 1383, though surviving only as a copy made in 1430. Later forms of the name that the village bore were, among others, Nanßweiler (1504) and Nantzweiler (1600).

== Religion ==
Even in the field of church history, a distinction must be drawn between the villages either side of the Glan. Dietschweiler and Nanzweiler on the left bank belonged from the Early Middle Ages onwards to the Church of Glan-Münchweiler, which was consecrated to Saint Pirmin and tended all churches in the Münchweiler Tal (dale). Dietschweiler and Nanzweiler on the right bank, which later grew together into Nanzdiezweiler, cannot be reckoned with any clarity as belonging to any church, but it is likely that they already then belonged to the parish of Kirchmohr. In the time of the Reformation, inhabitants of all these centres that now make up Nanzdietschweiler by lordly decree had to convert to Martin Luther’s teaching. This held true not only for all Electoral Palatinate but also for the lordly domains held by the House of Leyen, which, for its part, leaned towards political (and religious) developments in the Duchy of Palatinate-Zweibrücken. However, in 1588, when Duke Johannes I ordered a further conversion of all his subjects in Palatinate-Zweibrücken, this time to John Calvin’s Reformed beliefs, the Counts of Leyen opposed the policy's imposition within their own lordly landholds, and thus the people of the dale remained Lutheran, although they were still ecclesiastically bound to the Dukes of Zweibrücken. During the Thirty Years' War and in the decades that followed, among newcomers who came to settle in the region's now mostly empty villages were many Catholics, though the general tolerance of the Catholic faith came only during French King Louis XIV's wars of conquest. The King favoured the immigration of Catholic Christians through his population policy, and the French also reintroduced Catholic church services in Glan-Münchweiler. The Counts of Leyen also subsequently abided by this ecclesiastical policy. However, since both denominations were represented, the Church of Glan-Münchweiler had to adopt a simultaneum. During the 19th century, owing to strong growth among the Catholic population, particularly outside Glan-Münchweiler, using a simultaneous church became very difficult. Thus, in 1902/1903, the Catholic Christians got their own church, which, once again, was consecrated to Saint Pirmin. Likewise, plans arose in Nanzweiler to build a Catholic church there, and thus Nanzweiler built its Sacred Heart Catholic Church (Herz-Jesu-Kirche), which is now used by all Nanzdietschweiler's Catholic inhabitants. It was a branch of the Church of Glan-Münchweiler, and by 1922 it had become a curacy, a centre for caring for all souls in all the villages that now belong to Nanzdietschweiler, and thus even for Nanzdiezweiler, which had belonged to the parish of Kirchmohr. In Electoral Palatinate, too, the settlement of Catholic Christians was once again being promoted, and in Nanzdiezweiler the number of Catholics had grown greatly during the 19th century until after the Second World War, they were more than half the population. In 1926, a rectory was built in Nanzweiler. In 1959, the youth and parish hall were dedicated, and in 1965, the curacy was abolished. The Evangelical Christians, who had belonged to the parishes of Glan-Münchweiler and Steinwenden, founded in the early 20th century a church building association whose goal was to build a church in Dietschweiler for that village and several others. In 1947, Nanzdiezweiler was added to this list of villages. Only in 1954 was the goal reached when a new church was consecrated. At first, the pastor from Glan-Münchweiler was still the one who held services here. In 1960, the village's own vicariate was established and in 1963, this became a separate parish. In 1964, the rectory was dedicated. In 1970, the church got a peal of several bells, whereas before, worshippers had been called to services by a single, small bell. Today, all Nanzdietschweiler's constituent villages belong to the Evangelical parish, as does the village of Börsborn. The Evangelical church lost its independence once again in 1975.

== Politics ==
=== Municipal council ===
The council is made up of 16 council members, who were elected by proportional representation at the municipal election held on 7 June 2009, and the honorary mayor as chairman.

The municipal election held on 7 June 2009 yielded the following results:

Year	SPD	CDU	Total
2009	6	10	16 seats
2004	7	9	16 seats

=== Mayor ===
Nanzdietschweiler's mayor is Annette Filipiak-Bender.

=== Coat of arms ===
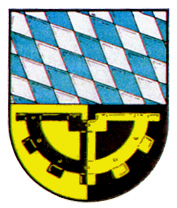
Nanzdiezweiler's arms

Nanzdietschweiler's arms

The German blazon reads: Durch einen silbernen Wellenpfahl von Blau und Schwarz gespalten, rechts ein silberner Pfahl, links ein rotbewehrter und -bezungter goldener Löwe.

The municipality's arms might in English heraldic language be described thus: A pale wavy argent between azure an endorse of the first and sable a lion rampant Or armed and langued gules.

The arms were approved by the Rheinhessen-Pfalz Regierungsbezirk administration in Neustadt an der Weinstraße on 26 February 1980. The charge on the sinister (armsbearer's left, viewer's right) side is drawn from the arms once borne by Electoral Palatinate, which was once Nanzdiezweiler's overlord. The silver endorse (a slim variant of a pale) on the dexter (armsbearer's right, viewer's left) side refers to the Counts of Leyen, to whom Dietschweiler and Nanzweiler once belonged. The wavy pale symbolizes the river Glan, which links the formerly self-administering municipalities, but which for centuries was a border that sundered the villages that now make up Nanzdietschweiler. The official interpretation holds that the Glan was formerly a border between two lordships following two different denominations of Christianity. The Ortsteil of Nanzdiezweiler bears its own arms that might be described thus: Per fess bendy lozengy argent and azure, and per pale Or and sable a half waterwheel counterchanged.

The municipality's flag is blue-white-blue in a 2:5:2 ratio, with the arms in the middle. It has been flown since 19 December 1985.

=== Town partnerships ===
Nanzdietschweiler fosters partnerships with the following places:

- Butten, Bas-Rhin, France since 1985.

The name is written with an umlaut in German: Bütten.

== Culture and sightseeing ==
=== Buildings ===
The following are listed buildings or sites in Rhineland-Palatinate’s Directory of Cultural Monuments:

==== Dietschweiler ====
- Protestant church, Kirchstraße 1 – sandstone-block aisleless church, square west tower, Swiss chalet style with Baroque Revival elements, 1952–1954, architect Hans-Georg Fiebiger, Kaiserslautern
- Hauptstraße 50 – Quereinhaus (a combination residential and commercial house divided for these two purposes down the middle, perpendicularly to the street), 1805, side wing not as old

==== Nanzdiezweiler ====
- At the bridge across the Glan – washing place on the Glan; ten three-step stairways, between them square pedestals
- Hauptstraße 56 – mill on the Glan; sandstone-framed plastered building, marked 1884; technical equipment from the 1920s and 1930s; barn, 1862, further commercial buildings

==== Nanzweiler ====
- Heart of Jesus Catholic Church (Kirche Herz Jesu), Von der Leyenstraße 5 – Gothic Revival aisleless church on rusticated pedestal with short transept wings, belltower with crow-stepped gables, 1907/1908, architect Wilhelm Schulte I, Neustadt an der Weinstraße, expansion 1969–1972

=== Natural monuments ===
Heimer Brühl is an 8.5 hectare wetland and nature conservation area in the Glan valley south of the village with many noteworthy ornithological and botanical features, which also, during times of flood, serves as a retention basin.

=== Regular events ===
Nanzdietschweiler holds two kermises (church consecration festivals, each locally known as the Kerwe), one in Dietschweiler on the second weekend in September and one in Nanzweiler the following weekend. Old customs are kept alive in some measure by the local costume club.

=== Clubs ===
Nanzdietschweiler more than 20 clubs. The foremost are as follows:

- Angelsportverein — angling club
- Cäcilienverein Nanzweiler — church choir
- Evangelischer Frauenbund Nanzdietschweiler — Evangelical women's association
- Evangelischer Gemischter Chor Nanzdietschweiler — Evangelical mixed choir
- FCK-Fanclub — football fan club
- Freiwillige Feuerwehr — volunteer fire brigade
- Katholische Frauengemeinschaft Nanzdietschweiler — Catholic women's association
- Landesjugendringgruppe und Trachtengruppe Nanzdietschweiler — state youth umbrella group and costume group
- Landfrauenverein Nanzdietschweiler — countrywomen's club
- Männergesangverein 1894 Nanzdietschweiler — men's singing club
- Musikverein Nanzdietschweiler — music club
- Obst- und Gartenbauverein Nanzdietschweiler — fruitgrowing and gardening club
- Pfälzerwaldverein Ortsgruppe Nanzdietschweiler — “Palatinate Forest Club” (hiking club), local chapter
- Schützenverein „Freischütz“ Nanzdietschweiler — shooting club
- Sportverein Nanzdietschweiler — sport club
- Wildsauverein — “Wild Sow Club”

== Economy and infrastructure ==
=== Economic structure ===
Nanzdietschweiler's villages were formerly structured by agriculture. The mill in the community was still working until 1980. It existed even before the Thirty Years' War and might have been one of the oldest mills in the Glan valley. Since that time, the relationships have altered fundamentally. The thirty agricultural operations that still existed here as late as 1980 have greatly shrunk in number, even if the area of farmland being worked has stayed about the same. The old craft businesses have mostly disappeared. Two are still in business. Businesses serving modern economic life have set up shop, a bus company, an earthmoving company and a colour design studio. Otherwise, those in the workforce must commute, mainly to Kaiserslautern, Homburg, Landstuhl and Kusel. Given Nanzdietschweiler's favourable location on the Autobahn A 62 (Kaiserslautern–Trier), it can be foreseen that industrial operations will locate here.

=== Education ===
Even the school history must be described for each of Nanzdietschweiler's constituent villages separately. In Dietschweiler, as early as the late 18th century, there was a Catholic winter school (a school geared towards an agricultural community's practical needs, held in the winter, when farm families had a bit more time to spare), which had been made possible through an endowment. There must however already have been a Protestant winter school, too. In 1823, “both schoolhouses” were supposedly auctioned, one of which was a Protestant schoolteacher's house into which he had built a schoolroom. In 1824, a communally owned schoolhouse for Dietschweiler's and Nanzdiezweiler's Protestant schoolchildren and for Dietschweiler's Catholic schoolchildren. Given the greater number of Protestant schoolchildren, the school also had a Protestant schoolteacher. A request from Catholic parents to establish a denominational school was turned down by the Landkommissariat of Homburg (a Bavarian subnational entity). Quite a few Catholic parents put the law to work for them so that they could send their children to the Nanzweiler school, where there was a Catholic schoolteacher. The Dietschweiler school was a one-room schoolhouse with seven grade levels and almost 50 schoolchildren. The question of denominationality was settled in 1937/1938 when the Christian communal school became compulsory under the Third Reich. The introduction of the eighth grade level and the trend towards smaller classes brought the building of a new, two-classroom school that much nearer. Such a school was dedicated in 1960. Even then, though, school organization was already blazing a new trail, one that led to a thorough reorganization of the way education was being delivered. With the introduction of regional and administrative reform came school reform as well. Hauptschule students at first had to go to the Hauptschule in Schönenberg-Kübelberg, and later the one in Glan-Münchweiler. It was also at this time that a new primary school came into being for the newly founded municipality of Nanzdietschweiler. Four classes of this primary school are still taught today at the Dietschweiler schoolhouse. In Nanzweiler, the government approved a Kollektenpatent in 1758 authorizing the collection of monies to finance the building of a schoolhouse. As in Dietschweiler, there were also two denominationally oriented winter schools in the village. In 1823, the citizens put forth the proposal to build a common schoolhouse for Protestant and Catholic schoolchildren, and by the following year, the project had been realized. In 1832, the schoolhouse got a belltower. Since classes in Nanzweiler were also attended by schoolchildren from neighbouring villages, the single classroom became too small, for a time even housing 100 pupils. In 1894, the municipality had the old schoolhouse torn down, and on the same spot arose a new one with more room and also a teacher's dwelling. The dwelling, however, was converted into another classroom in remodelling work done in 1936. In the time after the Second World War, parents were once again pressing for denominational schooling, and so in Nanzweiler there was one class each for Protestant and Catholic schoolchildren. By about 1970, though, when school reform was introduced, no classes were taught at the Nanzweiler schoolhouse anymore. The schoolhouse itself passed into private ownership. It now houses a branch of the Volksbank. Schoolchildren from Nanzdiezweiler originally attended classes in the neighbouring villages, and only in 1868 was the village's own schoolhouse built. It had an alternating teaching post at which Evangelical and Catholic schoolteachers were to take turns. Until 1909, a Catholic schoolteacher taught there, and thus, although it was a communal school, it generally came to be known as the “Catholic school”. During the First World War, another schoolhouse was built so that now there could be two denominational schools. When community schooling was introduced in 1938, there were suddenly five classrooms available for classes in the three villages, although only four were needed. The community could now use the extra one for other purposes, but it had to be given back over to school use after the Second World War once denominational schooling was reintroduced. Today, four classes of all primary school pupils from the whole area of Nanzdietschweiler are taught at the Dietschweiler schoolhouse. The Hauptschule students likewise at first had to go to the Hauptschule in Schönenberg-Kübelberg, and later the one in Glan-Münchweiler. Higher schools are to be found, besides in Kusel, mainly in Schönenberg-Kübelberg (Realschule), Homburg (Gymnasium), Ramstein and Landstuhl. Nanzdietschweiler also has its own kindergarten.

=== Transport ===
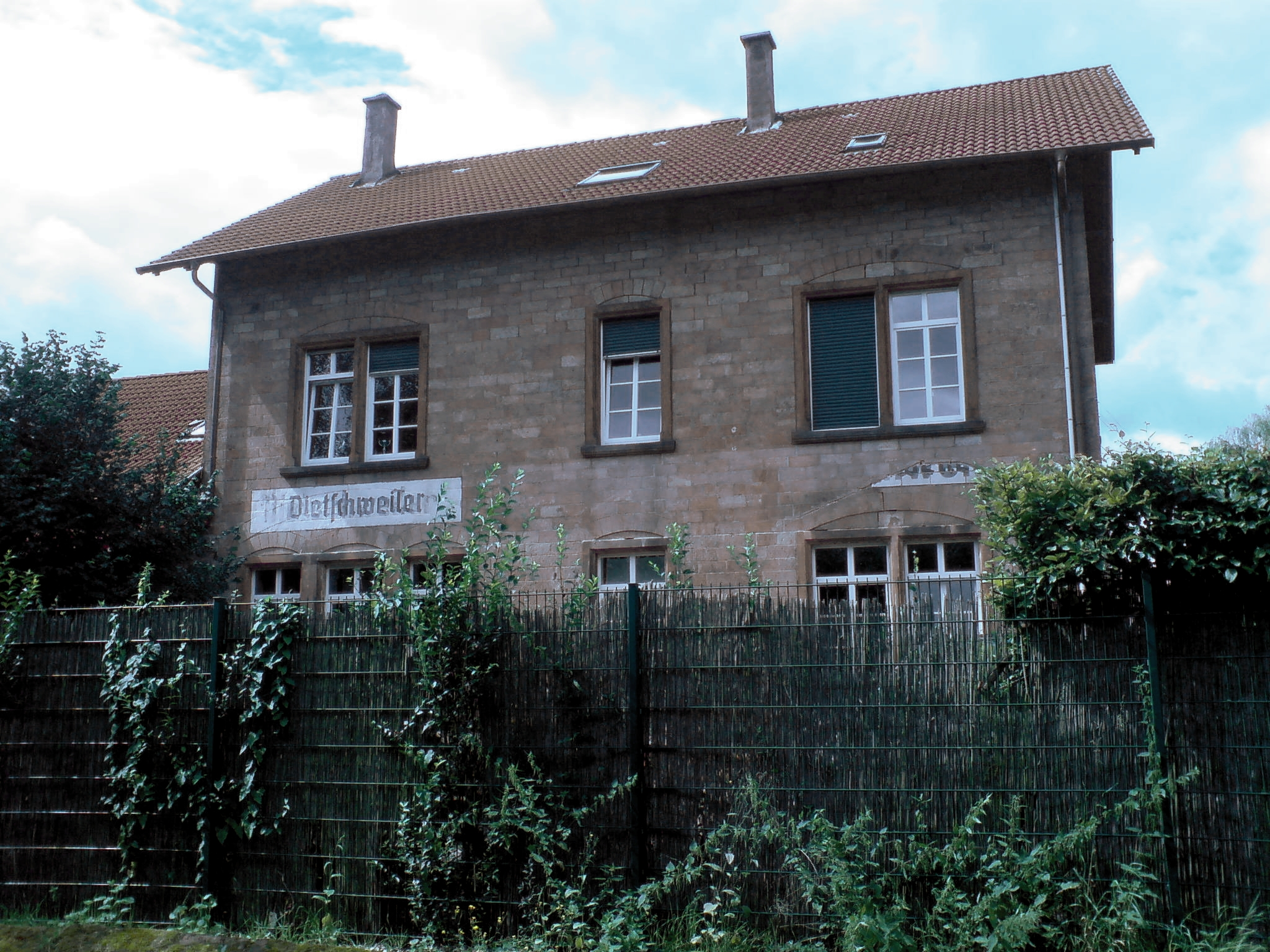
Dietschweiler Station reception building

Nanzdietschweiler lies on the linking road through the Glan valley between Glan-Münchweiler and Schönenberg-Kübelberg. Bundesstraße 423 runs in a straight line in the north parallel to this road. The Autobahn interchanges are very favourably placed, with Interchange 8 (Glan-Münchweiler) on the A 62 (Kaiserslautern–Trier) only some 3 km away, Interchange 9 (Hütschenhausen-Katzenbach), also on the A 62, 5 km away and Interchange 11 (Bruchmühlbach-Miesau) on the A 6 (Saarbrücken–Mannheim) only some 10 km away. Formerly, Nanzdietschweiler lay on the so-called strategic railway line between Bad Münster am Stein and Homburg (the Glan Valley Railway or Glantalbahn), which was built in 1904 and abandoned in the 1980s. The nearest railway station nowadays is Glan-Münchweiler station, 5 km away, on the Landstuhl–Kusel railway. The old station in the village first bore the name “Dietschweiler-Nanzweiler”, before it was renamed “Dietschweiler” in 1912. In the early 1960s, a halt was opened at Nanzweiler in the hopes of enhancing use of the southern stretch of the line between Homburg and Glan-Münchweiler, but by the late 1970s, the halt was closed. Passenger service ended in 1981, putting an end to all regular traffic, since goods service had already been given up between Schönenberg-Kübelberg and Glan-Münchweiler. In the late 1980s, the tracks were torn up. In 2002, the Glan-Blies Way, a cycling and hiking path, was opened on the former trackbed, eventually reaching its full length in 2006.
