= Börsborn =

- Municipality
- Coat of arms

- Location of Börsborn within Kusel district
- Interactive map of Börsborn
- Location within Germany Location within Rhineland-Palatinate
- Coordinates: 49°26′29″N 7°23′59″E
- Country: Germany
- State: Rhineland-Palatinate
- District: Kusel
- Municipal assoc.: Oberes Glantal

Government
  - Mayor (2019–24): Uwe Bier

Area
  - Total: 3.90 km^{2} (1.51 sq mi)
- Elevation: 302 m (991 ft)

Population (2025-12-31)
  - Total: 419
  - Density: 107/km^{2} (278/sq mi)
- Time zone: UTC+01:00 (CET)
  - Summer (DST): UTC+02:00 (CEST)
- Postal codes: 66904
- Dialling codes: 06383
- Vehicle registration: KUS
- Website: börsborn.de

Börsborn is an Ortsgemeinde – a municipality belonging to a Verbandsgemeinde, a kind of collective municipality – in the Kusel district in Rhineland-Palatinate, Germany. It belongs to the Verbandsgemeinde of Oberes Glantal.

The more than 500-year-old Muhleiche, an oak tree in the village's north end by the road going towards Steinbach am Glan and the belltower endowed by Countess Marianne von der Leyen in 1788-1789 are the village's main landmarks.

== Geography ==
=== Location ===
Börsborn lies on the southeast slope of the 400 m-high Steinberg some 300 to 340 m above sea level in the Western Palatinate. The western part of the municipality reaches an elevation of some 275 m above sea level. Rising both west and east of the village are small brooks that then flow south or east for only a few kilometres before emptying into the Glan. The peaks around the village do not quite reach as high as the Steinberg, with the Klopfberg in the northeast reaching 388 m above sea level and Auf der Hub in the west peaking at 20 m lower than that. The Ohmbachsee, a reservoir south of the neighbouring village of Gries, lies only some 3 km away. The municipal area measures 390 ha, of which 70 ha is wooded.

=== Neighbouring municipalities ===
Börsborn borders in the north on the municipality of Henschtal, in the east on the municipality of Nanzdietschweiler, in the south on the municipality of Gries, in the southwest on the municipality of Brücken and in the west on the municipality of Steinbach am Glan.

=== Municipality’s layout ===
Börsborn takes the shape of a clump village in whose middle three Kreisstraßen (District Roads) from neighbouring villages meet in a three-pointed star. Near this intersection, where the oldest built-up area is to be found, stands the belltower endowed by Countess Marianne von der Leyen. The building in the village's core is still characterized by the Einfirsthaus – literally “house with one roof ridge” – a style of farmhouse typical of the Westrich, an historic region that encompasses areas in both Germany and France. There is even an outstanding example of such a building in a homestead in which the stables and the barn are divided from the house in an arrangement called a Dreiseithof (“three-sided estate”). Other streets with workers’ houses and new building branch off from the middle of the village. In the village's north end on the road going towards Steinbach stands the former schoolhouse, now a village community centre. The graveyard lies in an open field in the village's south end. East of the village on a little wooded hill lies the sporting ground with its clubhouse.

== History ==
=== Antiquity ===
Even in prehistoric times, the area where Börsborn is now found was occupied by mankind, bearing witness to which are various archaeological finds made within municipal limits. The exact origin of a barrow on the Klopfberg has thus far not been ascertained. The barrow has a diameter of some 23 m and sometime in the past was dug, likely by unauthorized persons. Not far from this barrow are some more such ancient graves in Steinbach and Glan-Münchweiler. Another barrow, which belongs to a group of graves near Steinbach, lies in the west of Börsborn's municipal area. No Roman finds have yet turned up within Börsborn itself, although they have been unearthed nearby, notably in Glan-Münchweiler and Steinbach.

=== Middle Ages ===
From the contiguous Free Imperial Domain around Castle Lautern, Frankish kings split certain areas off to donate them to ecclesiastical and secular lordships. Great parts passed into Salian hands. Count Werner I of that family endowed in 737 the Hornbach Monastery, whose first abbot was Saint Pirmin. Werner furnished this monastery richly with estates and landholds, including the Münchweiler Tal (dale), in which Börsborn lies. The Hornbach Monastery enfeoffed various vassals with the dale (with Glan-Münchweiler as the main village), first the Raugraves in the Nahegau in 1323, then the Archbishop of Trier and in 1338 the Lords of Breidenborn. In connection with the Münchweiler Tal, the village of Börsborn was mentioned in documents repeatedly.

Through Georg I von der Leyen's marriage to Eva von Mauchenheim in 1456, the House of Leyen came into ownership of holdings in the Bliesgau, and once it had taken charge of an inheritance in 1486, it also acquired ownership of a share in Blieskastel Castle. At the same time, Abbot Ulrich of the Hornbach Monastery granted Jörge von der Leyen, a Burgmann at Castle Lautern, the Münchweiler Tal. The Lords of Leyen came from the country around the lower Moselle and already resided at their castle near Gondorf on the Moselle. For the most part, they served the archbishops of Trier, and Johann von der Leyen-Saffig was chosen as archbishop in 1556. Besides the House of Leyen, their kin, the Mauchenheims, were also enfeoffed in turn with shares of the monastery's holdings in the Münchweiler Tal. As of 1533, though, it was only the family of the Barons and later Counts of Leyen.

=== Modern times ===
Right up until the French Revolution, the division of power did not change in principle. Börsborn lay in the Münchweiler Tal over which the lordship of the House of Leyen, although as a matter of principle there were good links between Zweibrücken and the Counts of Leyen. The events of the Thirty Years' War and the Plague took a heavy toll on the village. A few years after the war, the House of Leyen began to expand its holdings on the Blies, the Saar and the Glan. The villages in the Münchweiler Tal within these scattered holdings were gathered together into an Unteramt of the whole lordship. Only in 1773 did the comital couple, Franz Karl von der Leyen and Marianne, née Dalberg, move their residence from Koblenz to Blieskastel. After Count Franz Karl's death in 1775, his beloved wife Marianne took over the regency for their not yet grown son Philipp. In 1787 and 1788, she had the striking belltowers in Börsborn and Steinbach am Glan built, now said to be village landmarks. The countess managed to flee during the occupation of Blieskastel by French Revolutionary troops and sought refuge first in Koblenz with the local people's support, and later in Frankfurt. Under Emperor Napoleon’s rule, the House of Leyen got its personal property back. Under French rule after 1801, Börsborn lay in the Department of Sarre, whose seat was at Trier, in the Arrondissement of Saarbrücken, in the Canton of Waldmohr and in the Mairie (“Mayoralty”) of Glan-Münchweiler.

==== Recent times ====
In 1814, the French withdrew from the German lands on the Rhine’s left bank. In 1817, the Kingdom of Bavaria acquired these lands under the terms laid out by the Congress of Vienna and called them Rheinbaiern (“Rhenish Bavaria”), but later Bayerische Rheinpfalz (“Bavarian Rhenish Palatinate”). The administrative entities that had by that time arisen were renewed. Within the Kingdom of Bavaria, Börsborn belonged to the Bürgermeisterei (“Mayoralty”) of Glan-Münchweiler, the Canton of Waldmohr and the Landkommissariat (later Bezirksamt and Landkreis – district) of Homburg in the Rheinkreis – yet another name for Bavaria's exclave in the Palatinate. After the First World War, the district of Homburg was assigned to the British- and French-ruled Saar, but the Canton of Waldmohr stayed with the newly formed Free State of Bavaria, and thereby with Germany. It belonged with an administrative outpost to the Bezirksamt of Kusel, which existed until 1940. Beginning then, the former Canton of Waldmohr was also administered from Kusel. Thus, Börsborn now lay within the district of Kusel, but stayed in the Bürgermeisterei of Glan-Münchweiler. In the course of administrative restructuring in Rhineland-Palatinate, Glan-Münchweiler became the seat of a Verbandsgemeinde, within which Börsborn became an Ortsgemeinde.

=== Population development ===
As can be seen in the older part of the village's built-up area, Börsborn was, well into the 20th century, mainly a farming village. Nonetheless, there were already workers quite early on who were employed mainly in the nearby mines and quarries. Roughly one third of the population was and still is Catholic, with the other two thirds being Evangelical. There were also once Jews in the village. They were tolerated in the Münchweiler Tal, not always for altruistic reasons, by the ruling House of Leyen. They were, however, forbidden to work farms in the time before the French Revolution, nor could they work at a craft or even do business unless it was under Christian witnesses’ watchful eyes. They played an important role foremost in livestock trading, even after the French Revolution had put them on a like legal footing with Christians.

Found among Börsborn's inhabitants today are people of the most varied of occupations, and most must commute to jobs outside the village. Until the very end of the 19th century, the population was rising quickly, only to fall off again with emigration. The population rose again in the years leading up to the Second World War. The great number of newcomers that arrived after the war can be traced to ethnic Germans driven out of Germany's former eastern territories. In recent years, there has been a definite downward trend.

The following table shows population development over the centuries for Börsborn, with some figures broken down by religious denomination:

Year	1825	1835	1871	1905	1939	1961	2000
Total	283	322	400	373	409	527	450
Catholic	91					152
Evangelical	173					371
Jewish	19					–

=== Municipality’s name ===
The placename ending —born, cognate with the English “bourne” (although without quite the same meaning), most likely means the springs found around the village (the Modern High German word for one of these is Brunnen). Prefixed to this is the syllable Börs—, which is not at all easy to interpret. It might refer to an old name for one of the brooks that rise near the village. However, it is not altogether absurd to relate it to the meanings “remote” and “humble/mean/poor”, meanings borne by the Old High German word boese (in Modern High German, böse means “evil”, “nasty”, “angry” or simply “bad”). According to researcher Ernst Christmann, Börsborn had its first documentary mention in 1303 as Bersborn in the Breidenborn Cartulary. It likewise appears there in 1383 as Berßborn. Other names by which the village has gone over the ages are, among others, Berßborne (1420), Birsborn (1564) and Bürßberg (1611).

== Religion ==
Börsborn belonged from the Middle Ages onwards to the Church of Glan-Münchweiler, which was consecrated to Saint Pirmin and oversaw all churches in the Münchweiler Tal. In the time of the Reformation, Börsborn, like all other villages in the Münchweiler Tal, had to embrace Martin Luther’s teachings, on the feudal lord’s orders, although it is worth noting that in religious matters, the lordship of the House of Leyen at first for the most part followed whatever the Duchy of Palatine Zweibrücken chose to do. When the John I, Count Palatine of Zweibrücken, ordered all subjects to convert to Calvinism in 1588, though, the Counts of Leyen resisted the imposition of this order over their own lands. The Christians in the dale kept to their Lutheran faith, but were subject to an ecclesiastical administration run from Zweibrücken. After the Thirty Years' War came freedom of religion. Among the newcomers after the war were Catholics, and others arrived as a result of the efforts to populate the area during King Louis XIV’s wars. Furthermore, the Catholic faith was promoted by the Counts of Leyen. Thus, Börsborn’s population once more had a considerable Catholic sector.

Today, the Protestants belong within the Evangelical deaconry of Kusel to the parish of Dietschweiler, while Catholics belong within the Catholic deaconry of Kusel to the parish of Glan-Münchweiler. As long as there were Jews in the village, they attended services at the synagogue in Steinbach.

== Politics ==
=== Municipal council ===
The council is made up of 8 council members, who were elected by proportional representation at the municipal election held on 7 June 2009, and the honorary mayor as chairman.

The municipal election held on 7 June 2009 yielded the following results:

Year	SPD	WGR	Total
2009	3	5	8 seats
2004	2	6	8 seats

“WGR” is a voters’ group.

=== Mayor ===
Börsborn's mayor is Uwe Bier.

=== Coat of arms ===
The municipality's arms might be described thus: Per fess abased argent an oaktree eradicated and fructed vert and azure a pale of the first.

The charge in the upper half of the escutcheon, the oaktree, refers to the old oaktree in the village, which stands as a natural monument. The pale (vertical stripe) in the lower half of the escutcheon is a reference to the village's former allegiance to the House of Leyen. The arms have been borne since 1969 when they were approved by the now defunct Regierungsbezirk administration in Neustadt an der Weinstraße.

== Culture and sightseeing ==
=== Buildings ===
The following are listed buildings or sites in Rhineland-Palatinate’s Directory of Cultural Monuments:

- Hauptstraße 21 – three-sided estate, 19th century; sandstone-framed Quereinhaus (a combination residential and commercial house divided for these two purposes down the middle, perpendicularly to the street), marked 1826, commercial wing 1895, pigsty, dung pit, farmer's garden
- Near Steinbacher Straße 4 – belltower; plastered building with tent roof, 1758

=== Clubs ===
Börsborn has a singing club with a mixed choir and a children's choir, a countrywomen's club and a sport club.

=== Regular events ===
Börsborn inhabitants celebrate their kermis (church consecration festival) on the last Sunday in September.

== Economy and infrastructure ==
=== Economic structure ===
Agriculture was once held to be the most important source of income, but is now only of lesser importance. Major industrial operations are not to be found in the village. Börsborn is a residential community for those who earn a living at the industrial operations in the Saarland and elsewhere. Groundwork for a tourism industry could be strengthened.

=== Transport ===
Börsborn lies on Kreisstraße (District Road) 8 leading from Steinbach to Miesau. Within the village, Kreisstraße 10 to Nanzdietschweiler branches off. To the northeast and southeast lie the Autobahnen A 62 (Kaiserslautern–Trier; interchange 8 at Glan-Münchweiler) and A 6 (Saarbrücken–Mannheim; interchange 11 at Miesau) respectively, each about 10 km away.

Serving nearby Glan-Münchweiler is Glan-Münchweiler station on the Landstuhl–Kusel railway. There are hourly trains at this station throughout the day, namely Regionalbahn service RB 67 between Kaiserslautern and Kusel, named Glantalbahn after a former railway line that shared a stretch of its tracks with the Landstuhl–Kusel railway, including the former junction at Glan-Münchweiler).

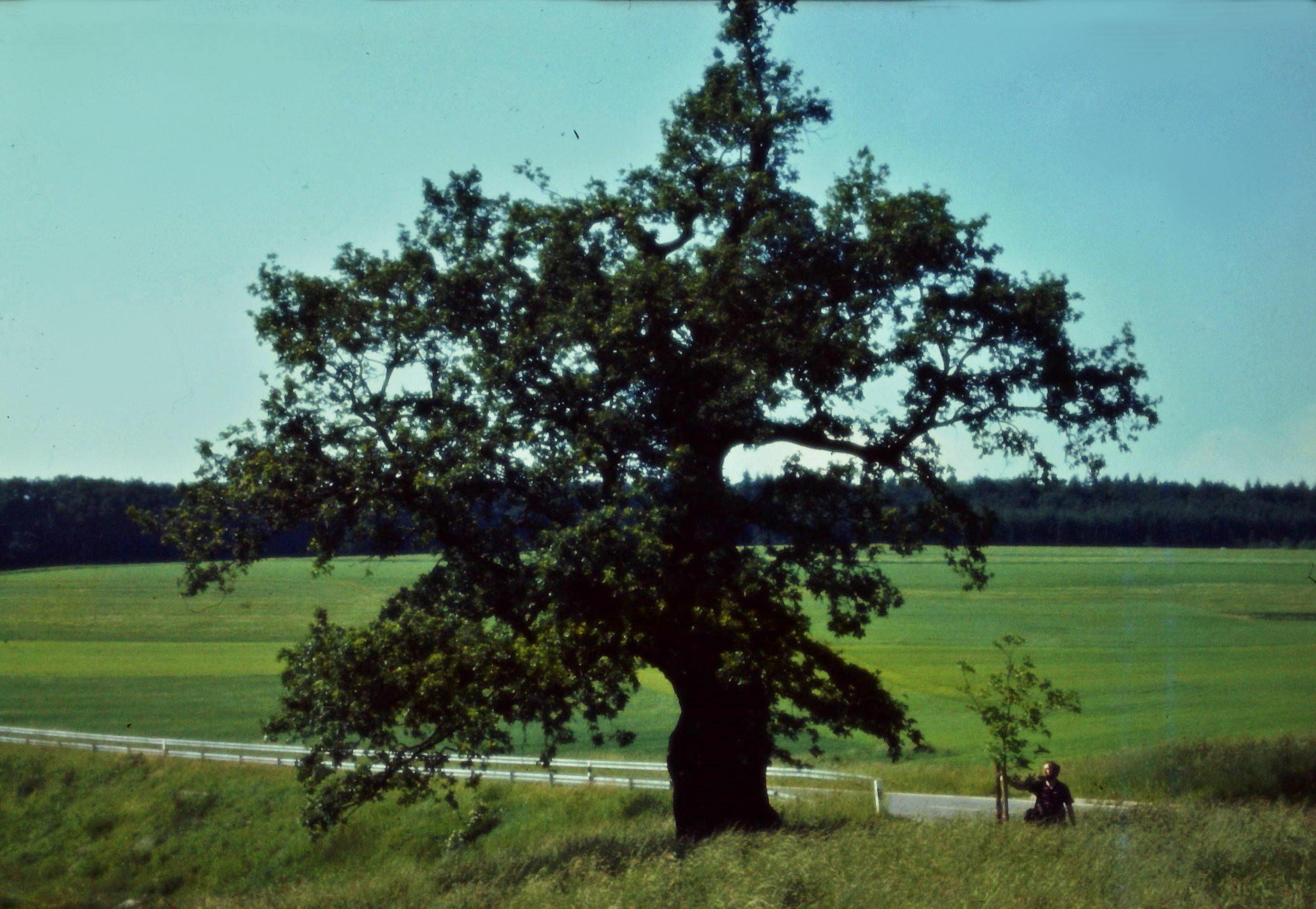
Muhleiche about 1978

=== Education ===
Under the old feudal régime in the time before the French Revolution, there could hardly have been said to be any common level of schooling among the villages. Seldom did a village have its own schoolhouse, and classes were often taught in private houses. In smaller villages, like Börsborn, there was only winter school (a school geared towards an agricultural community's practical needs, held in the winter, when farm families had a bit more time to spare). The first schoolteacher in Börsborn was mentioned in 1765. He taught the Catholic schoolchildren. As early as the time of the County of Leyen, in 1777, there were a Protestant schoolhouse and a Catholic one, each one in a private house. About 1780, the Catholics got their own schoolhouse, and extensive school land, too; it was an endowment from Father Kaufhold. There was later a great deal of disagreement over the priest's endowment. In the Kingdom of Bavaria, the authorities strove to get every community to build its own schoolhouse, and in 1823, the Landkommissariat (district) of Homburg demanded that schoolhouses be brought into a better condition, and that efforts be made to teach children of both denominations together, which of course would also save money. The Catholic sector of the population especially mounted successful opposition to the official efforts with regard to Father Kaufhold's endowment. Nevertheless, in 1837, a single schoolhouse rose, with the requirement that there be a classroom for each of the two classes: the big Protestant one and the smaller Catholic one. Not only that, but the schoolhouse also had to contain two dwellings, one for the Catholic teacher and the other for the Protestant one, of course.

The dispute over Father Kaufhold's endowment nevertheless kept flaring up and only in 1919 was it laid to rest for good. That same year, according to the school journal, classes had to be suspended for a while because nobody was prepared to light the furnace.

Since 1969, primary school pupils and Hauptschule students have been attending their respective schools in Glan-Münchweiler.

Higher schools can be found in Kusel, while special schools are to be found in Kusel and Brücken. The nearest university towns are Kaiserslautern, Homburg and Trier.

== Famous people ==
=== Sons and daughters of the town ===
- Ute-Christine Krupp (1962–), author
