= Glan-Blies Way =

Cycleways in Germany

Glan-Blies Way (Glan-Blies-Radweg)
- Length: 128 km
- Location: France/ Saarland, Rhineland-Palatinate (Palatinate)
- Designation: 4 of 5 stars/ description ADFC classifications
- Trailheads: Sarreguemines, Staudernheim
- Use: Low; partly on roads in the towns
- Elevation gain/loss: 200 m to 270 m/ ca. 660 Hm climb; 727 Hm descent
- Difficulty: Inclines: ca. 80 % light; rest 2-3 %
- Surface: c. 50 % asphalt or concrete, c. 40 % gravel, rest natural paths
- Website: Glan-Blies Way

The Glan-Blies Way (German: Glan-Blies-Weg) is a long distance cycle route and hiking trail that is 130 kilometres long. It begins in the German state of Rhineland-Palatinate at Staudernheim on the River Nahe, follows the course of the Glan, crosses the state of Saarland along the Blies and finishes in Lorraine in France.

== Route ==
The way begins on the Nahe Cycleway. Running past Disibodenberg Abbey and then making its way via Odernheim am Glan and Meisenheim it reaches the Kusel Musikantenland. In the Veldenz town of Lauterecken there is a railway connexion and the option to switch onto the Lauter Valley Cycleway to Kaiserslautern. A few kilometres further on, the trail passes Offenbach-Hundheim and the old Benedictine Provost Church of St. Mary. It then continues initially in a southwesterly direction, then swings south to Altenglan. At Altenglan, a junction with the Fritz-Wunderlich Way runs through Kusel on an old railway trackbed to Freisen. Between Altenglan and Staudernheim, there is a separate c. 40 km (25 mi) draisine route that runs through the Glan valley. The cycleway continues for two kilometres alongside the federal highway.

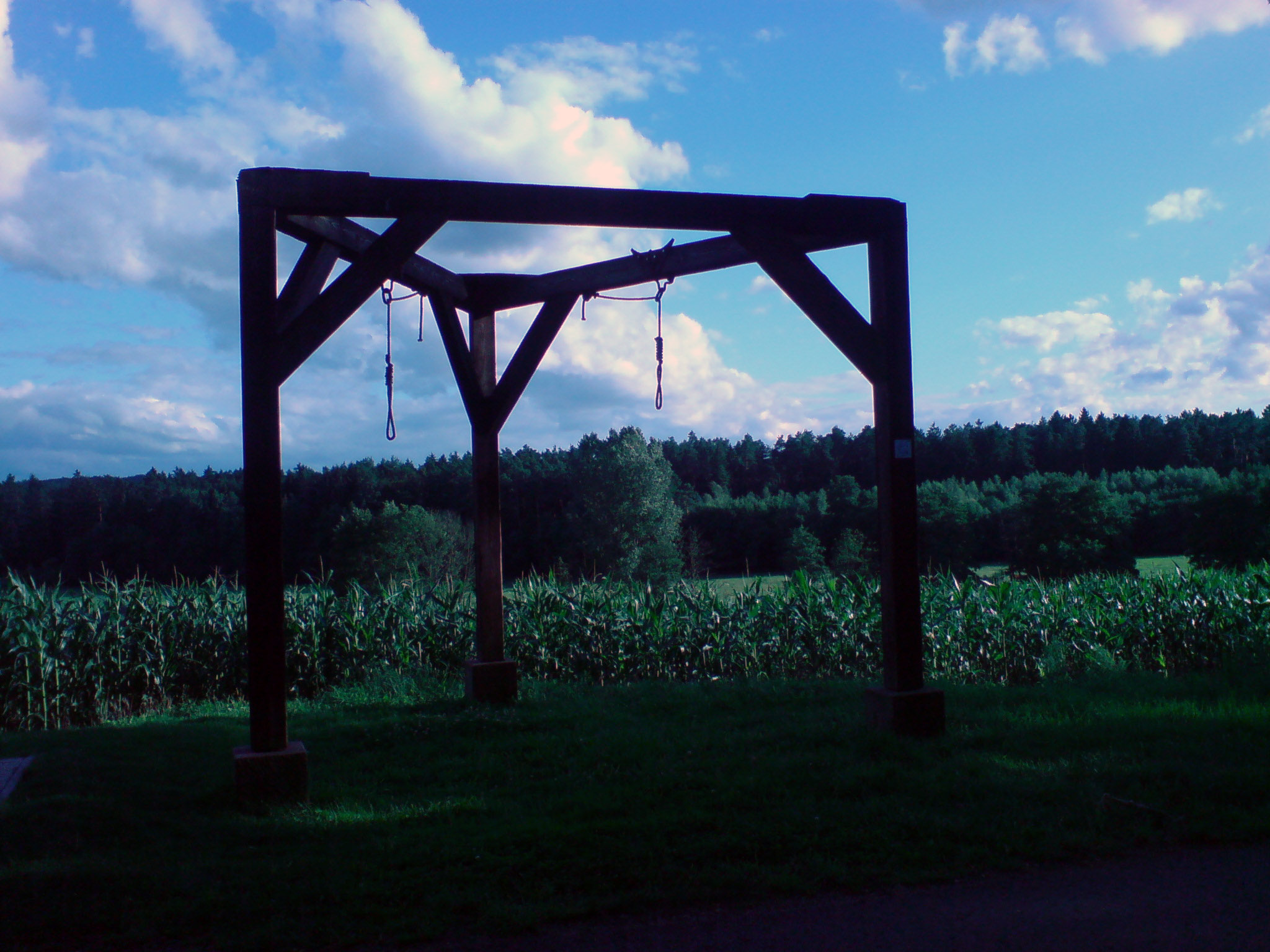
Replica of the historical Kübelberg gallows in Sand on the Glan-Blies Cycleway

Between Glan-Münchweiler and Niedermohr the Barbarossa Cycleway branches off, running through North Palatinate to Worms. From Glan-Münchweiler the route follows the old trackbed of the Glan Valley Railway via Nanzdietschweiler, with its old washing facility and the preserved mill from 1884, through the Elschbach Tunnel. It continues past the lake of Ohmbachsee to Schönenberg-Kübelberg, where it passes the protected railway station. Next, the way passes Waldmohr with its bog mill and the Eichelscheiderhof. Here it leaves the route of the railway and follows cycle tracks to Homburg.

After Beeden the way runs along the River Blies through the Bliesgau Biosphere Reserve. In Wörschweiler, a detour goes to the abbey ruins and the Schwarzenacker Roman Museum. On the next stage, the route reaches Blieskastel with its baroque Altstadt. The route runs along the old embankment of the Blies Valley Railway. The last station on German soil is the Bliesbruck-Reinheim European Culture Park, with a Celtic prince's grave and settlement from the Roman era. Here the way crosses the Franco-German border and comes to an end after Saargemünd (French: Sarreguemines) at the confluence of the Blies and the Saar.

In Sarreguemines the Glan-Blies Way is joined from the north by the Saar Cycleway, which runs between Sarreguemines and Völklingen parallel to the Saarland Cycleway. To the south is a junction with the cycling path along the Saar Canal and thus to the French cycle network.

== Signage and surfacing ==
The bidirectional way is signposted throughout. The waymarks along the route give the distances and destinations as well as the logo of the way. The multicolored emblem features a bicycle calling out and reads Glan-Blies-Weg. The route runs predominantly on asphalt forest tracks, farm tracks and cycle paths.

== Literature ==
- Thorsten Brönner: Deutschlands schönste Flussradwege. 15.000 traumhafte Flusskilometer vom Alpenrand zum Nordseestrand. Bruckmann, München 2013, ISBN 978-3-7654-5107-2, pp. 178–181.
