= Barbarossa Cycleway =

Cycle path in Germany

Coordinates: 49.4714636°N 7.4445371°E

- Barbarossa-Radweg
- Length: 88 km
- Location: North Palatine Uplands, Palatinate Forest and Weinstraße/ Rhineland-Palatinate, Germany
- Trailheads: Glan-Münchweiler, Worms
- Use: Predominantly forest and agricultural tracks
- Elevation gain/loss: +800 Hm uphill / −920 Hm downhill
- Difficulty: Steep inclines at 5 km (3 mi) in the Palatine Forest
- Surface: Mainly tarmac, also coarse gravel.
- Certification: Description at ADFC; ADFC classifications
- Website: radwanderland.de (pdf; 575 kB)

The Barbarossa Cycleway (German: Barbarossa-Radweg) is an 88-kilometre-long (55 mi) cycle path in Germany that links the North Palatine Uplands to the old imperial city of Worms on the River Rhine. It passes through the largely level but varied landscape of the Palatinate region before it reaches the vineyards of the Rhine Plain. It thus links the Glan-Blies Cycleway via the Barbarossa city of Kaiserslautern with the Rhine Cycleway. The whole route is uniformly signed with the cycleway logo, which portrays a stylised Emperor Barbarossa. The figure of Emperor Frederick Barbarossa at the north portal of Worms Cathedral was used as the prototype. Several sections have been left natural, so the cycleway is not suitable for racing bicycles or inline skates.

== Sources ==
- Radwanderland.de retrieved November 2011
