= Glan-Münchweiler =

- Municipality
- Coat of arms

- Location of Glan-Münchweiler within Kusel district
- Interactive map of Glan-Münchweiler
- Location within Germany Location within Rhineland-Palatinate
- Coordinates: 49°28′17″N 7°26′46″E
- Country: Germany
- State: Rhineland-Palatinate
- District: Kusel
- Municipal assoc.: Oberes Glantal

Government
  - Mayor (2019–24): Karl-Michael Grimm (SPD)

Area
  - Total: 5.99 km^{2} (2.31 sq mi)
- Elevation: 222 m (728 ft)

Population (2025-12-31)
  - Total: 1,153
  - Density: 192/km^{2} (499/sq mi)
- Time zone: UTC+01:00 (CET)
  - Summer (DST): UTC+02:00 (CEST)
- Postal codes: 66907
- Dialling codes: 06383
- Vehicle registration: KUS
- Website: www.vg-glm.de

Glan-Münchweiler is an Ortsgemeinde – a municipality belonging to a Verbandsgemeinde, a kind of collective municipality – in the Kusel district in Rhineland-Palatinate, Germany. It belongs to the Verbandsgemeinde of Oberes Glantal.

== Geography ==
=== Location ===
The municipality lies in a hollow in the Glan valley in the uplands in the Western Palatinate, with peaks such as the Galgenberg, the Klopfberg, the Eckertsberg and the Wingertsberg. On the Glan’s right bank, at the foot of the Hochwald (“High Forest”) lies the outlying centre of Bettenhausen. The bottom of the dale has an elevation of 215 m above sea level. The highest elevation within municipal limits lies in the Eichenwald (“Oak Forest”) at 388 m above sea level. Glan-Münchweiler lies roughly 8 km southeast of Kusel and 25 km west of Kaiserslautern. The municipal area measures 464 ha, of which 112 ha is wooded.

=== Neighbouring municipalities ===
Glan-Münchweiler borders in the north on the municipality of Rehweiler, in the east on the municipality of Niedermohr, in the south on the municipality of Nanzdietschweiler, in the southwest on the municipality of Börsborn, in the west on the municipality of Henschtal and in the northwest on the municipality of Quirnbach.

=== Constituent communities ===
Glan-Münchweiler’s Ortsteile are Glan-Münchweiler (main centre) and Bettenhausen.

=== Municipality’s layout ===
On the terrace that juts out from the western slope into the Glan valley, monks from Hornbach Abbey established an estate in the 8th century for clearing and farming the surrounding countryside. The village core that arose here with its estate and church was fortified on the downstream side in 1344, as witnessed by “civic building”. After the Thirty Years' War, Glan-Münchweiler’s built-up area spread westwards towards what is today Marktstraße (“Market Street”). Ringstraße and Hauptstraße (“Main Street”) soon formed a residential quadrangle through which ran only one street from the village core, Kirchstraße (“Church Street”). With the opening of the building zone in the cadastral area known as “Teich” (“Pond”), the built-up area began to spread northwards in 1953 towards the slopes of the Fronberg and Galgenberg, stopping only at the ridge in many places. With the graveyard’s expansion in 1970, even Friedhofstraße (“Graveyard Street”) and the area below were opened up. The Autobahn, also finished in 1970, touches Glan-Münchweiler just at the southwest, tightly hemming the village’s development in. Only the sporting ground with its two football pitches and athletic complex could be laid out to the highway’s west. The supply road built for the Autobahn’s construction was developed after the Second World War and is now called Embachstraße. The forester’s house built in 1914 on the road leading out of Glan-Münchweiler towards Quirnbach served after the war as a kindergarten owned by the Catholic Church, although it is now under private ownership. At the turn of the millennium, Glan-Münchweiler had 27 streets and 358 houses.

== History ==
=== Antiquity ===
The village’s beginnings and first settlers lie in the time before the Christian Era. Archaeological finds of stone hatchets within Glan-Münchweiler’s limits bear witness to settlers in the New Stone Age. The barrow fields in the Eicherwald give clues as to a certain continuity in settlement in the Iron Age. Glan-Münchweiler lies at the crossroads of some old roads. Many finds from the 2nd and 3rd centuries AD show that the place was settled in Roman times. A trove of coins unearthed in 1976 in what is now the village core, along with further clues, point to a fire in 351 or 352.

=== Middle Ages ===
After the Frankish takeover of the land, the Glan-Münchweiler area passed in about the middle of the 8th century through donation into Hornbach Abbey’s ownership. About this time, the Hornbach monks established an estate (after which the municipality is named; see Municipality’s name below) for clearing and farming the land, and also built a church, some remnants of which were found in today’s church’s foundations. The Hornbach Monastery pledged the “Münchweiler Tal” (dale) in the time that followed to the Raugraves of Neuenbaumburg and Altenbaumburg. Thus, secular lords became the fiefholders in this area. In 1383, the fief passed to the Lords of Breitenborn, and shortly thereafter to the Burgmann family of Mauchenheim. Sir Georg von der Leyen wed Eva Mauchenheimer in 1468, thus beginning the long lordship of the Counts of Leyen in the “Münchweiler Tal”, which lasted until 1801. Glan-Münchweiler acquired the status of Unteramt together with the villages of Steinbach, Haschbach, Nanzweiler, Dietschweiler, Börsborn and Gries. The seat of the Oberamt was Blieskastel. The highest lord in the land remained, however, the Dukes Palatine Zweibrücken, who exercised the blanket lordship over the Hornbach Monastery. Over the centuries, this led to disputes over questions of authority. There were usually two Schultheißen, one appointed by the Counts of Leyen and the other by the Duchy of Palatinate-Zweibrücken. The first Schultheiß appointed by the Counts of Leyen in 1490 was named Andreas Stemmler, while the first one appointed by the Duchy was named Johann Jakob Röhrich.

=== Modern times ===
The ecclesiastical, legal and social convulsions in the time of the Reformation brought new antagonisms and disputes into the “Münchweiler Tal”. The Dukes of Zweibrücken, as rightful successors to the Hornbach Monastery, were Reformed, whereas the Counts of Leyen had chosen to remain Catholic. Administration and use of landholds were forever a cause of disagreement and feuding. During the Thirty Years' War, Glan-Münchweiler was largely destroyed and plundered by Croatian mercenaries. In 1621, Glan-Münchweiler was stricken with a frightful outbreak of the Plague, which claimed most of the lives in the village. Indeed, two villages in the “Münchweiler Tal” – Reichertsweiler and Fröschweiler – died right out in the epidemic.

==== Recent times ====
The French Revolution brought the hitherto prevailing lordship arrangements to an end. Imperial Countess Marianne von der Leyen, during her flight before the French Revolutionary troops, sought shelter for a week at the Evangelical rectory. The County of Leyen was dissolved in 1801; likewise liquidated was the Duchy of Palatinate-Zweibrücken. The Palatinate was now French. Münchweiler became the seat of a mairie (“mayoralty”), belonging to which were also the villages of Steinbach, Haschbach, Nanzweiler and Dietschweiler. The village now lay in the Canton of Waldmohr, the Arrondissement of Saarbrücken and the Department of Sarre. After the Palatinate’s cession to the Kingdom of Bavaria in 1816, Glan-Münchweiler was administered by the Landcommissariat of Homburg. In 1920, after the First World War, the Saar passed to France. The Canton of Waldmohr, which belonged to the Bezirksamt of Homburg, and along with it the Bürgermeisterei (“Mayoralty”) of Glan-Münchweiler, was grouped into the Kusel district. In preparation for the Battle of France in the Second World War, the Organisation Todt built a Führer Headquarters in Glan-Münchweiler, called “Waldwiese” (“Glade”). It was, however, never used as such. Since then, the complex has been completely dismantled. Considerable changes arose from the 1969-1972 administrative restructuring in Rhineland-Palatinate. On 7 June 1969, the hitherto self-administering municipality of Bettenhausen was split away from the Kaiserslautern district, grouped into the Kusel district and merged with Glan-Münchweiler to form the new municipality of Glan-Münchweiler, which itself became the seat of a newly created Verbandsgemeinde in 1972, to which also belong Börsborn, Herschweiler-Pettersheim, Hüffler, Wahnwegen, Krottelbach, Langenbach, Quirnbach, Henschtal, Steinbach am Glan, Nanzdietschweiler, Rehweiler and Matzenbach. Glan-Münchweiler retains this form to this day.

=== Population development ===
Of the just under 300 inhabitants in Glan-Münchweiler in 1610, only six “subjects/families” were left when the Thirty Years' War ended. In 1725 it was reported that there were shoemakers, shopkeepers, weavers and nailers who had joined together in guilds. By introducing cotton spinning as a cottage industry, opportunities to earn income were improved. Approval for trial digging for coal and other minerals was first granted in 1764. Glan-Münchweiler’s population figures rose in the 18th and 19th centuries, but only slowly. Quicker growth came only after the First World War.

The following table shows population development over the centuries for Glan-Münchweiler:

Year	1610	1650	1825	1835	1871	1905	1919	1938	1949	1961	1970	1999
Total	300	21	536	563	577	605	708	886	1,034	1,210	1,295	1,232

=== Municipality’s name ===
Sources differ on the date of first documentary mention and the name’s original form. According to Hans Weber, writing at regionalgeschichte.net, Glan-Münchweiler had its first documentary mention in 1333 as Monichwilari, derived from the Latin Monachorum Villa (“the monks’ estate”). Other names that the village has had over the ages are Monchwilre (1415), Monchwiller (1564), Münchweiler am Glan (1730), Glan-Münchweiler (as of 1885).

Nevertheless, according to the Verbandsgemeinde website and authors Wilhelm Volkert and Richard Bauer, Glan-Münchweiler had its first documentary mention as Mönchweiler in 1019. Mönch is still the German word for “monk” today (this is a reference to the monks’ estate); Weiler means “hamlet”, or originally “homestead”. In 1330, the slightly different spelling of Münchweiler was used, and then in 1867, the village was known as Münchweiler am Glan. Finally, in 1885, the village settled on the name Glan-Münchweiler, which it still bears today.

The sources at least agree that Bettenhausen had its first documentary mention in 1393 but they differ as to whether the original name was Bottenhusen (Weber) or Bottenhausen (Volkert et al.). Weber furthermore puts forth the notion that the village was likely named after a man named Botto; so the name Bettenhausen would mean “at Botto’s house”.

The name of the river Glan is of Celtic origin and means “fishing water” or “clean water”.

== Religion ==
About 820, some monks took over the Frankish estate that had been here and built the first, Romanesque chapel, which was consecrated to Saint Pirmin, for it had been he who had founded their monastery at Hornbach. In the early 13th century, the great Gothic church arose, whose quire and vestry still exist today. Its lovely windows and graceful vault ribs make it a jewel among churches. In 1771, the church’s nave was renovated, leading to the discovery of three Viergöttersteine that had been used as part of the foundation (a Viergötterstein is a sculpted stone of monumental size designed to support a Jupiter Column; its German name means “four-god stone” in reference to the godly images carved into each of its four sides). They, of course, point to a Roman origin for Glan-Münchweiler. Further renovations to the church were undertaken in 1853-1854 and 1958. Until the Reformation, Glan-Münchweiler and its parish lay under the Hornbach Monastery’s overlordship. The abbot had patronage rights at the church. It was he who named and paid the priest and he gathered tithes from each family, as was customary. After the Reformation, the Hornbach Monastery was dissolved. The Dukes of Palatine Zweibrücken had been the ones who had introduced the Reformation. The first Lutheran pastor is known to have been in the village as of 1555. A rectory was built in 1599. In 1737, this was torn down and a new one was built on the same spot. This still stands today and is still the Protestant rectory. Along with the Haus Lehné, it is one of Glan-Münchweiler’s oldest buildings. There is one thing that characterizes the local ecclesiastical history in a somewhat unusual way. It arose from the longstanding dispute over who had authority in the “Münchweiler Tal”, with both the Duke of Palatinate-Zweibrücken and the Counts of Leyen vying for supremacy. It turned into a struggle between Protestants and Catholics over who held the post of parish priest (or pastor, as the case may be) and who got to use church property and income. In 1684, the Catholics were granted the right to share the church. During the upheavals arising from French King Louis XIV’sPolitique des Réunions, a further improvement in the Catholics’ favour arrived on the scene. A 1786 agreement awarded the Protestants two thirds and the Catholics one third of the church’s property. With this compromise, the two denominations for the most part lived together in peace. The simultaneum at the church lasted until 1902. The Catholic community then built its own church and received from the Protestants an indemnity of 8,000 marks.

== Politics ==
=== Municipal council ===
The council is made up of 16 council members, who were elected by proportional representation at the municipal election held on 7 June 2009, and the honorary mayor as chairman.

The municipal election held on 7 June 2009 yielded the following results:

Year	SPD	CDU	Total
2009	7	9	16 seats
2004	7	9	16 seats

=== Mayor ===
Glan-Münchweiler’s mayor is Karl-Michael Grimm (SPD).

=== Coat of arms ===
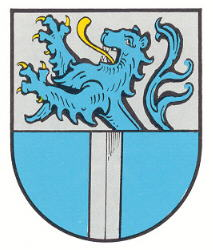
Bettenhausen’s old coat of arms

The municipality’s arms might be described thus: Gules in base an inescutcheon azure a pale argent, issuant from behind which Saint Pirmin of the third vested, mitred and crined Or holding in his dexter hand a book of the field and in his sinister hand an abbot’s staff, the crook to sinister, of the fourth.

The human charge in the arms, Saint Pirmin, is a reference to the village’s founding by monks from the Hornbach Monastery, which Pirmin founded. The inescutcheon azure a pale argent (that is, blue with a vertical silver stripe) is a reference to the village’s former allegiance to the House of Leyen, whose counts held the fief in Glan-Münchweiler from 1486 to 1794, and who bore such arms. In its current form, the arms match a court seal from 1564.

Bettenhausen, too, once bore its own arms, for it was once a self-administering municipality. Its arms might be described thus: Per fess argent a demilion azure armed and langued Or and azure a pale of the first. The lion is a reference to the village’s former allegiance to the County of Veldenz, the Duchy of Palatinate-Zweibrücken and Electoral Palatinate. The lower half of the arms is the old Leyen arms.

== Culture and sightseeing ==
=== Buildings ===
The following are listed buildings or sites in Rhineland-Palatinate’s Directory of Cultural Monuments:

==== Glan-Münchweiler (main centre) ====
- Saint Pirmin’s Catholic Parish Church (Pfarrkirche St. Pirminus), Ringstraße 29 – two-naved Romanesque Revival sandstone block building, belltower, 1900–1902, architect Wilhelm Schulte I
- Hauptstraße 16 – Protestant parish church; mediaeval rectangular quire, flanking quire tower, vestry addition in the 15th century, Baroque aisleless church, 1771 while maintaining surrounding walls, architect Philipp Heinrich Hellermann, Zweibrücken; Stumm organ from 1865; Roman spolia and sarcophagi
- Beethovenstraße 4 – Protestant rectory; Quereinhaus (a combination residential and commercial house divided for these two purposes down the middle, perpendicularly to the street) with half-hipped roof, marked 1737, commercial wing 1777
- Hauptstraße 2 – mill on the Glan; stately building with half-hipped roof, 1812, architect Peter Bell, Kusel; joining wing with waterwheels, part of the old mill building, 1938, later given extra floor and expanded
- At Hauptstraße 13 – sandstone gateway arch, marked 1754
- Hauptstraße 21 – so-called Alte Apotheke (“Old Apothecary”); house, sandstone-framed plastered building, 1862
- Ringstraße 42 – former forestry office building; villalike building with hipped roof, one-floor side wing and staircase, marked 1914, architect Bruno Seyfarth, Kaiserslautern; characterizes village’s appearance
- Schulstraße 1 – former school; cube with teaching-room wing and one-floor entrance and lavatory building, pitched roofs, Bauhaus style, 1932, architect Bruno Seyfarth, Kaiserslautern; characterizes village’s appearance

==== Bettenhausen ====
- Bettenhausen 31 – Rüb estate complex; corner complex, essentially from the 18th century, expansion into three-sided estate in the 19th century; house with wooden gallery and half-hipped roof, marked 1751, two commercial wings, 1882/1886, shed, servants’ house; characterizes village’s appearance
- Bettenhausen 33 – stately Quereinhaus, 1835; together with Rüb estate complex characterizes village’s appearance

=== Regular events ===
The traditional kermis (church consecration festival) is held on the second weekend in July. Year’s end is characterized by many club festivals and ends with a communal Christmas market.

=== Clubs ===
Participating in Glan-Münchweiler’s cultural and social life are many clubs and organizations. Foremost among these would be the “Liederkranz” singing club, founded in 1876, and the gymnastic and sport club from 1922, each with its various departments and many activities. As a pastime, nine-pin bowling has long been popular; the oldest of the many clubs has existed since 1910. In the field of culture, events staged by the folk high school at the Glantalschule (school) can be named. Moreover, the Verbandsgemeinde organizes its own concerts under the name “Kultur live”. The churches and the ecclesiastical clubs also enrich the offerings of events. The bank branches in Glan-Münchweiler also offer many exhibitions.

== Economy and infrastructure ==
=== Economic structure ===
In the small territory held by the Counts of Leyen, the most important economic endeavour was until the early 19th century agriculture. Since the Middle Ages, though, there had been other occupations in Glan-Münchweiler having to do with administration, transport and trade. In the original 1845 cadastral survey, 36 farming businesses and 45 people who ran other kinds of businesses were listed. Improvements to economic circumstances and the building of the railway in 1868 brought along with them a measure of upward mobility among the villagers. There was a great expansion in trades, among them dealers in livestock, fruit, fertilizer, agricultural machinery, fat and coal as well as brewers and tanners. The Volksbank was founded in 1875, and the Raiffeisenbank in 1891. The only major firm in Glan-Münchweiler is Gebrüder Hanz (“Gebrüder” = “Brothers”), which is in the construction business (road and underground construction), and was founded in 1940. The most important commuting destinations are Kaiserslautern and Homburg.

=== Education ===
The first schools in the “Münchweiler Tal” were established after the Reformation. The pastor was also the schoolteacher, holding classes at either the church or the rectory. The schoolteachers and schoolmasters are known from records beginning in 1580. They were paid very meanly from church coffers for their teaching at winter school (a school geared towards an agricultural community’s practical needs, held in the winter, when farm families had a bit more time to spare) from early November to late February. They were craftsmen, mainly coopers, tailors or blacksmiths. The teacher’s workshop or some other wanting room would be where classes were held. Considerable improvements to schooling conditions were wrought by the 1710 building of the Protestant parish schoolhouse. By 1772, this had grown far too small and was torn down, only to be replaced with a new, bigger one. At this time, Glan-Münchweiler had 60 Evangelical and 30 Catholic schoolchildren. The earliest Catholic school is attested from 1686. Particularly worthy of mention in Glan-Münchweiler’s paedagogical life is that two related “teacher families” characterized teaching at the Evangelical school in an uninterrupted sequence of schoolteachers spanning two hundred years, the families Börstler and Kiefer. The new political order in 1818 (the Palatinate had recently been awarded to the Kingdom of Bavaria by the Congress of Vienna) brought schooling decisive changes. School became compulsory and year-round. In 1831, a new Evangelical schoolhouse was built, and so was a Catholic one. Both are still standing, on what is now Beethovenstraße, but both are now private houses. Both were used as schools, though, for 100 years, until the new shared school building was completed in 1932. For the disparate village schools in the “Münchweiler Tal”, the eventual building of a combination primary school-Hauptschule in 1975 on the Galgenberg was an important advance. Beginning in the 2000-2001 school year, the Hauptschule was run as part of the Regionalschule, thereby offering all students a nearby opportunity for education. The district folk high school and the district music school maintain branch locations in Glan-Münchweiler. The Evangelical parish sponsors a three-class kindergarten. A new building is being planned.

=== Transport ===
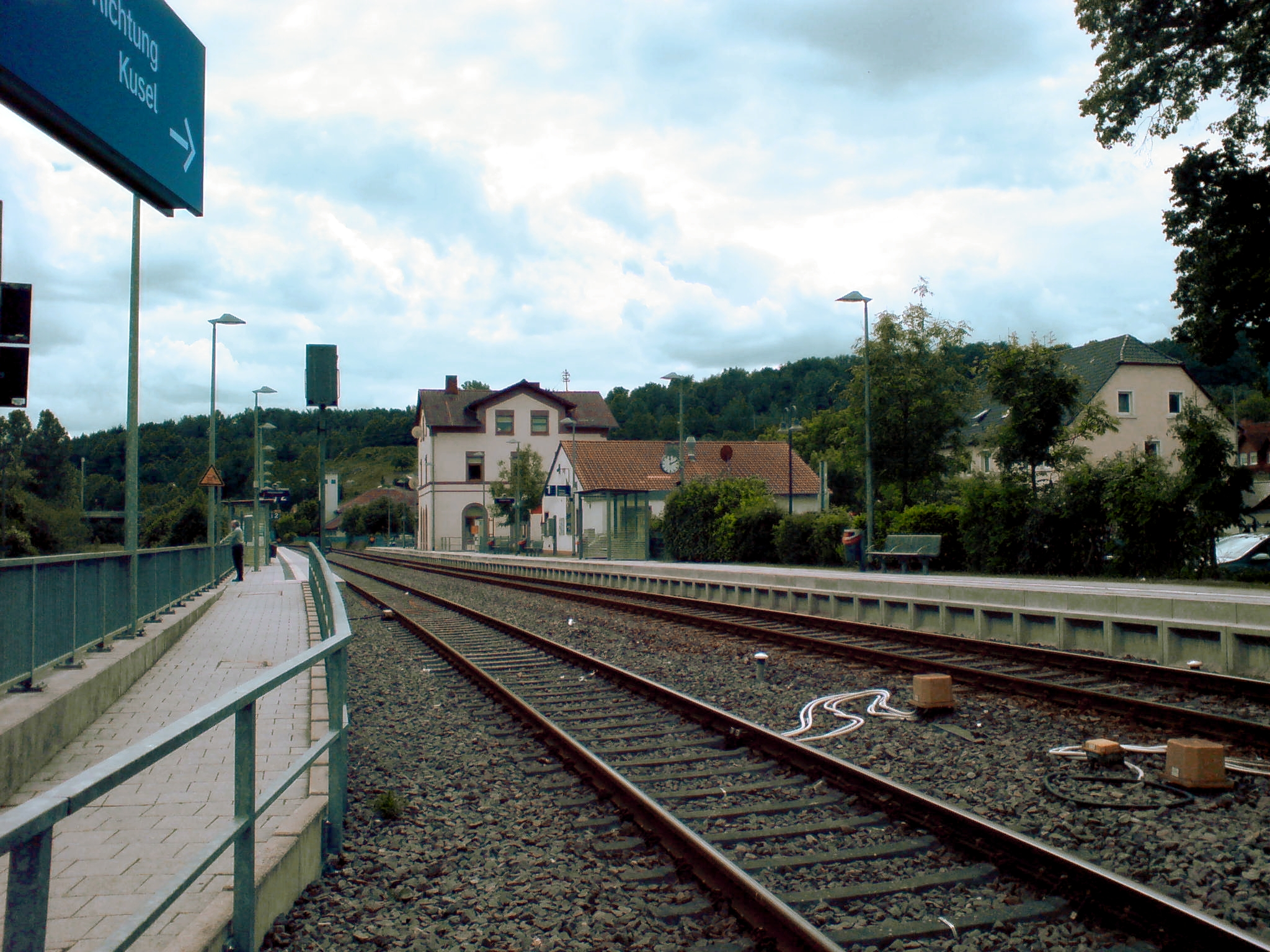
Glan-Münchweiler railway station

Serving Glan-Münchweiler is Glan-Münchweiler station on the Landstuhl–Kusel railway. There are hourly trains at this station throughout the day, namely Regionalbahn service RB 67 between Kaiserslautern and Kusel, named Glantalbahn after a former railway line that shared a stretch of its tracks with the Landstuhl–Kusel railway, including the former junction at Glan-Münchweiler. It also lies on the Autobahn A 62 (Kaiserslautern–Trier); the interchange is also called Glan-Münchweiler.

In the area where Glan-Münchweiler today lies, two long-distance roads crossed each other even as far back as Roman times. The building of the railway line between Landstuhl and Kusel in 1868 and of the one between Glan-Münchweiler and Homburg contributed considerably to improvements in transport links. Meeting here are Bundesstraße 423 from Homburg to Altenglan and two highways to Miesau and Landstuhl. The connection to the Autobahn A 62 (Kaiserslautern–Trier) right near the village in 1970 was a further upgrade towards being a transport hub. Nevertheless, the Autobahn and other highways, the railway and the river Glan have served as dividers and limits, greatly thwarting the village’s expansion, but there is now, given the favourable location with regard to transport and the high quality of living, a long and growing demand for building land.

== Famous people ==
=== Sons and daughters of the town ===
- Johann Christian Boerstler (b. 1752 in Glan-Münchweiler; d. about 1820 in Maryland)

Boerstler was one of the best known personalities from the families Kiefer and Boerstler, who were related by marriage, and who for almost 200 years worked as teachers in the “Münchweiler Tal”. Besides his profession, Boerstler busied himself with naturopathy. He was freedom-loving and criticized exploitation by the authorities. In 1784, he emigrated to the United States and there successfully worked as “Dr. Boersteler”. Parts of his journals have been published.

- Armin Reichel (b. 31 January 1958 in Glan-Münchweiler)

A footballer.

- Johann Ludwig Daniel Weber (b. 1775 in Glan-Münchweiler; d. 20 August 1854 in Glan-Münchweiler)

Weber was a mill owner and the mayor of Glan-Münchweiler. During the French Revolutionary troops’ occupation, the Bannmühle (mill) was transferred into his ownership. He furthered trade and the ideas of freedom in Glan-Münchweiler. The number of businesses rose sharply. Successors of the Weber clan from Glan-Münchweiler are today the owners of the Karlsberg brewery in Homburg (branded as Karlsbräu outside Germany to avoid confusion with the Danish brewer Carlsberg).

=== Famous people associated with the municipality ===
- Otto Feick (b. 1880 in Reichweiler; d. 1959 in Schönau an der Brend)

Feick was the inventor of the Rhönrad and grew up in Glan-Münchweiler. Owing to his passive resistance to the Occupation of the Rhineland, the French removed him from the Palatinate. Up to 1925, he was developing the said gymnastic device, which he called the “Rhönrad” after his new home, the Rhön Mountains (Rad means “wheel”). By exhibiting it at the 1936 Summer Olympics, Feick made the Rhönrad world-famous. Wheel gymnastics is a sport now pursued in many countries. In Feick’s honour, the municipality has placed a Rhönrad as a monument in the middle of the roundabout on Bundesstraße 423 in the outlying centre of Bettenhausen.

- Paul Nägle (b. 1907 in Wiesbaden; d. 1967 in Glan-Münchweiler)

Nägle worked as a pastor in Münsterappel and from 1950 to 1967 in Glan-Münchweiler. In many presentations, a comprehensive two-volume parish history and many publications he concerned himself intensively with both ecclesiastical and local history.

- Axel A. Weber (b. 1957 in Kusel)

Weber is the former President of Deutsche Bundesbank; he spent most of his youth in Glan-Münchweiler. His parents still live there.
