= Wolfersheim =

Municipality in Saarland, Germany

Coordinates: 49°11′22″N 7°13′26″E

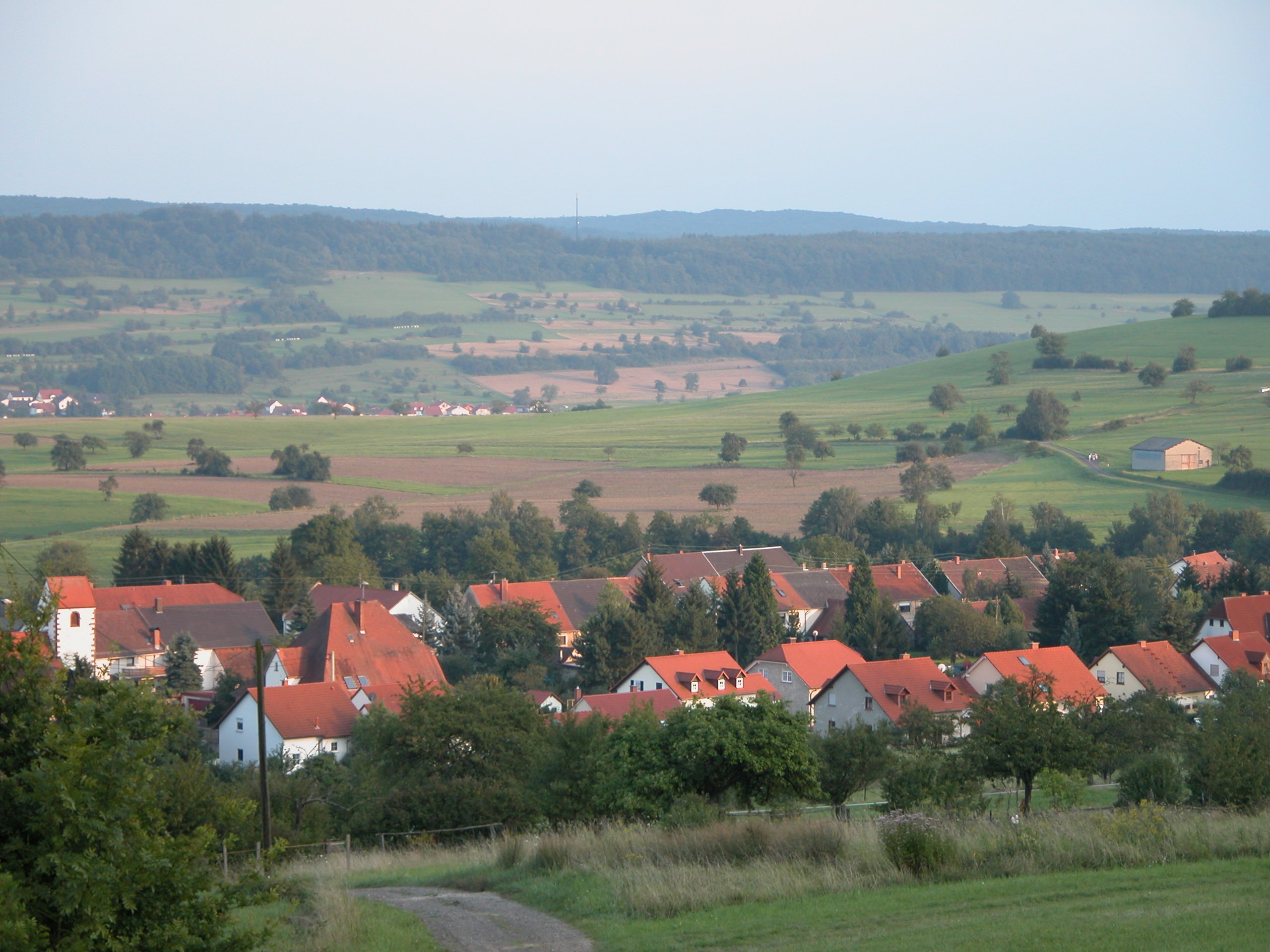

Wolfersheim is a village in the municipality of Blieskastel in the region Bliesgau (Saarland, Germany).

== Geography ==
The village is situated on the east hillside of Kalbenberg, right of the river Blies.

The church (its origins date back to the 14th century) is the center of the village. In front of the church is one of the many fountains that can be found throughout the village, all beautifully decorated with stone sculptures. The village has many chestnut and walnut trees and well as mixed orchard grasslands.

== History ==
On the mountain ridge close to Wolfersheim a group of graves were found that date back from the Hallstatt culture (800 - 500 AD).

Wolfersheim was first documented in 1274 and was a settlement of a Frankish man Wolfhari. The main road of the village is still named after Wolfhari. In the late Middle Ages, the village belonged to the monasteries of Hornbach, Gräfinthal and Wadgassen. Since 1453, Stephen, Count Palatine of Simmern-Zweibrücken became the regent. In 1777 baron Christian Cathcart von Carbiston received the village from Charles II August, Duke of Zweibrücken. But only one year later, the village was sold to countess Marianne von der Leyen in Blieskastel due to financial straits.

The village has a rural character. Many of the old farmhouses from the 19th and 20th century were restored in the last years and therefore the original character of the village could be maintained. The many clubs and the engagement of the resident give Wolfersheim its special character. In 2004, Wolfersheim won the gold medal in a competition called "Unser Dorf soll schöner werden" (Our village shall become more beautiful) on national level.

During World War II, the Protestant (Lutheran) church in Wolfersheim was heavily damaged. After the war, there have been several restorations of the church in 1958–1960, 1974, and most recently in 1996–1997.
