= Bliesgau =

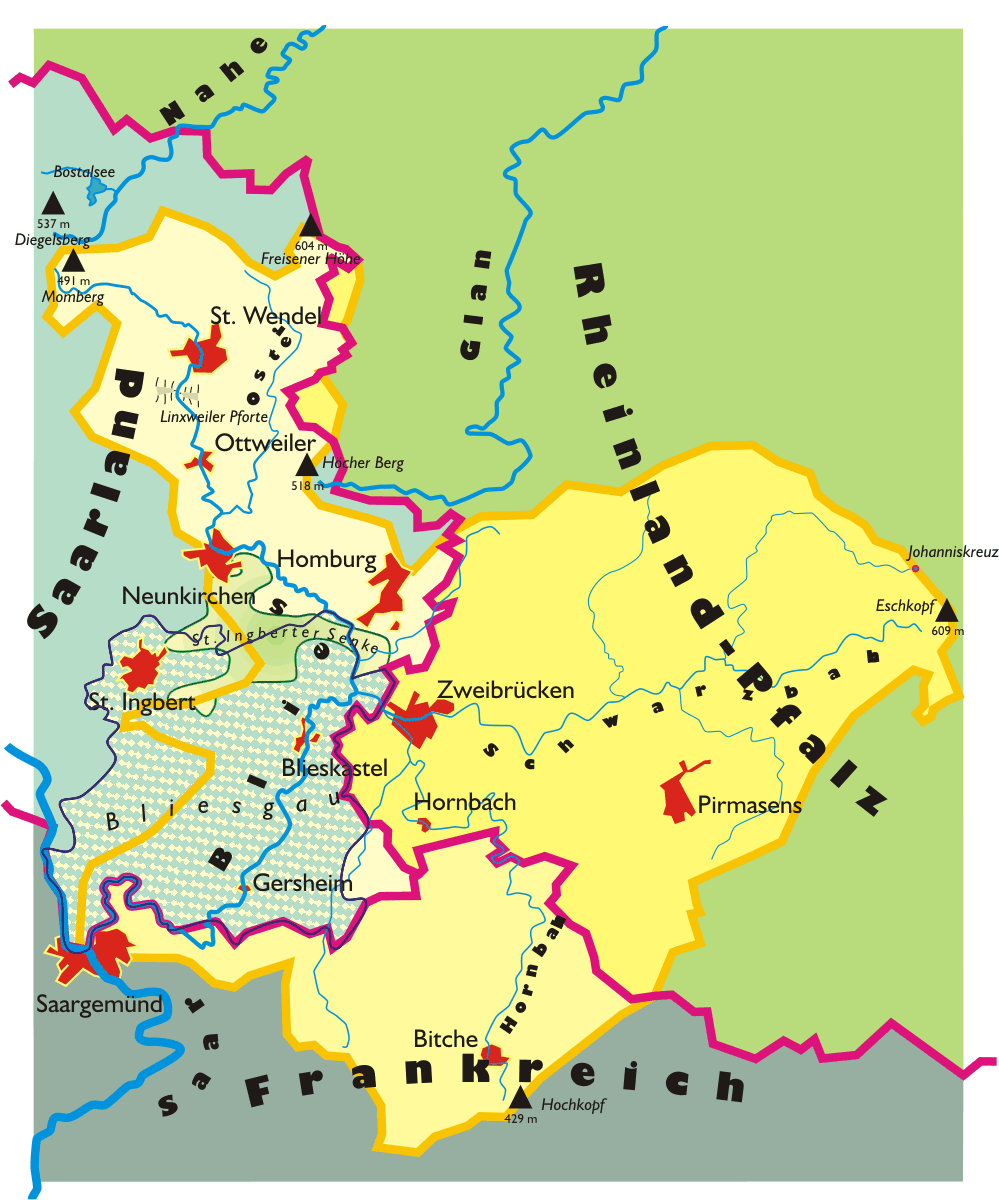
Map of the Bliesgau

The Bliesgau is a region in the state of Saarland in the south-west of Germany and borders with France. It is named after the River Blies, which is a tributary to the Saar.

Blieskastel is the principal town of the district. Other towns in the area include Gersheim, Mandelbachtal and Wolfersheim. The region forms part of the larger Muschelkalk geological zone.

Historically the district is first recorded in the seventh century when it formed part of the lands of the Bishopric of Metz, along with neighbouring Sankt Ingbert. It was ruled by Counts of Bliesgau.

== Bliesgau Biosphere Reserve ==
The district Einöd is part of the biosphere reserve Bliesgau with the Pfänderbachtal in Einöd forming a core zone of 45 hectares. The region is a sanctuary for many rare animal and plant species such as the little owl, beaver, red kite, lizard orchid, and the yellow rattle. Almost half of all types of orchids that occur in Germany can be found here, on the vast, semi-dry grasslands that cover formations of limestone. Over the years the area has become a breeding ground for storks and nests with young birds can be observed. At certain periods dozens of storks can be observed in the air or on the ground.

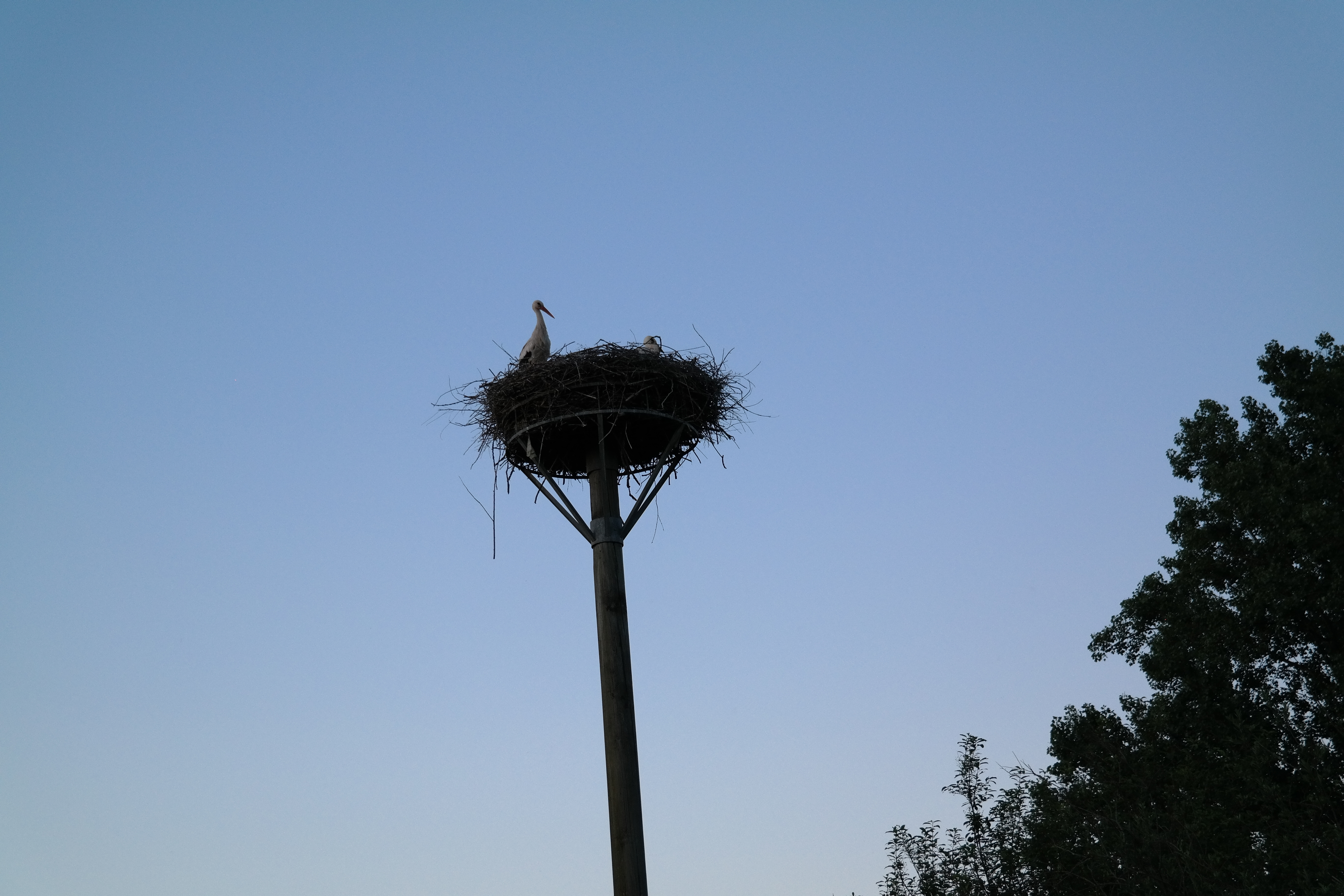
Storknest in Einöd (Saar), Biosphere Reserve Bliesgau,

The Bliesgau is located at the south-eastern corner of Saarland, bordering France and Rhineland-Palatinate. It is an area of outstanding natural beauty and cultural richness. The area is characterized by wide meadow orchards, beech groves and the impressive meadow landscape of the Blies river. Because of its picturesque landscape it is often referred to as the "Tuscany of Saarland". On May 26, 2009, the Bliesgau was recognized by the UNESCO as a German Biosphere Reserve.
