= Niedermohr =

- Municipality
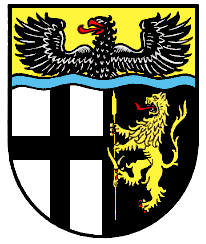
- Coat of arms

- Location of Niedermohr within Kaiserslautern district
- Interactive map of Niedermohr
- Location within Germany Location within Rhineland-Palatinate
- Coordinates: 49°27′28″N 7°28′04″E
- Country: Germany
- State: Rhineland-Palatinate
- District: Kaiserslautern
- Municipal assoc.: Ramstein-Miesenbach
- Subdivisions: 3

Government
  - Mayor (2019–24): Uli Zimmer (CDU)

Area
  - Total: 12.13 km^{2} (4.68 sq mi)
- Elevation: 219 m (719 ft)

Population (2025-12-31)
  - Total: 1,449
  - Density: 119.5/km^{2} (309.4/sq mi)
- Time zone: UTC+01:00 (CET)
  - Summer (DST): UTC+02:00 (CEST)
- Postal codes: 66879
- Dialling codes: 06383
- Vehicle registration: KL
- Website: www.niedermohr.de

Niedermohr is a municipality in the district of Kaiserslautern, in Rhineland-Palatinate, western Germany.
