= Pirmin =

Saint Pirmin
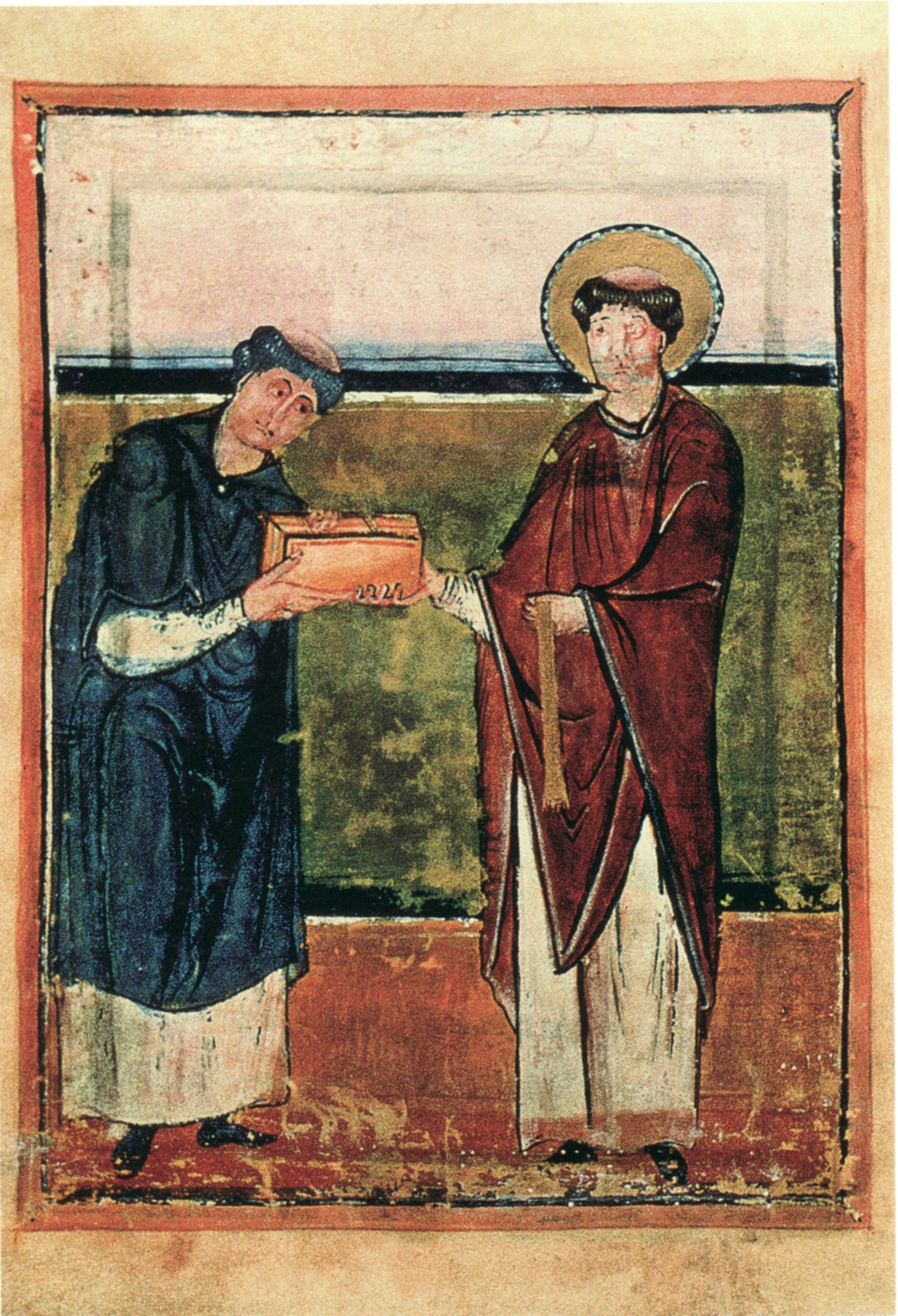
- Illustration from the Hornbach Sacramentary: Abbot Adalbert of Hornbach presents the manuscript to his patron saint, Pirmin
- Born: 700 somewhere in Spain
- Died: November 3, 753; Hornbach, Germany
- Venerated in: Roman Catholic Church; Eastern Orthodox Church
- Feast: November 3

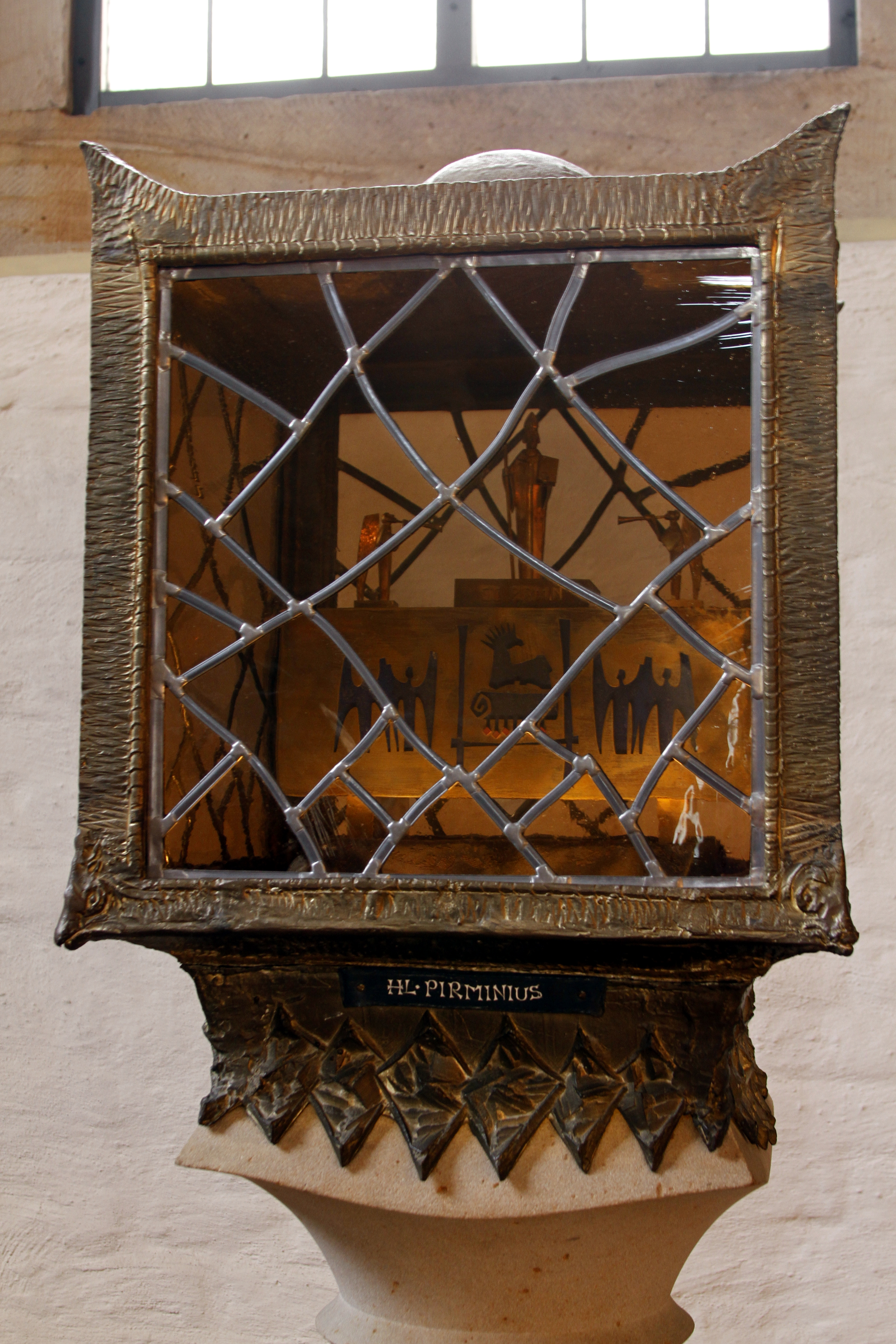
Relic in Speyer Cathedral.

Pirmin (Latin: Pirminius; before 700 – November 3, 753), was a Merovingian-era monk and missionary who founded or restored numerous monasteries in Alemannia. He is regarded as a saint in the Catholic Church.

== Biography ==
Pirmin was probably from the area of Narbonne, possibly of Visigothic origin. Many Visigoths fled to Francia after the Arab conquest of Spain at the beginning of the 8th century.

From 718 onwards, he was abbot of the monastery Quortolodora in Antwerp (Austrasia) and, together with its pupils, served the church inside the broch, Het Steen. (In the 12th century, this church was dedicated to Saint Walpurga.) According to legend, Pirmin blessed a spring that wells up near Kaundorf. The spring’s water is said to have healing properties. A chapel on the site is dedicated to him.

After a while Pirmin was invited by count Rohingus to stay at his villa in Thommen, near Sankt Vith in the Ardennes. Pirmin gained the favour of Charles Martel, mayor of the palace of Francia. He was sent to help rebuild Disentis Abbey in what is today Switzerland. In 724, he was appointed abbot of Mittelzell Abbey on Reichenau Island, which had earlier founded. Later, for political reasons, he was banished to Alsace. In 753, he died in the abbey at Hornbach, where his body is entombed.

== Missionary and other activities ==
Pirmin's missionary work mainly took place in the Alsace and the upper area of the Rhine and the Danube. Besides actively preaching and converting, he also founded or reformed many monasteries, such as those at Amorbach, Gengenbach, Murbach, Wissembourg, Marmoutier, Neuweiler, and Reichenau. Pirmin secured endowments from area nobility: Odilo of Bavaria financed the foundation of Niederaltaich Abbey, Werner I of what became the Salian dynasty endowed the new abbey at Hornbach.

The most important of Pirmin's books is Dicta Abbatis Pirminii, de Singulis Libris Canonicis Scarapsus ("Words of Abbot Pirminius, extracts from the Single Canonical Books"). The book collects quotations from Church Fathers and scriptures, presumably for use by missionaries, or reading during monastic meals. Written between 710-724, it contains the earliest appearance of the present text of the Apostles' Creed.

== See also ==
- Saint Boniface
- Saint Willibrord
- Schottenklöster
