= Nestelberg (Wasgau) =

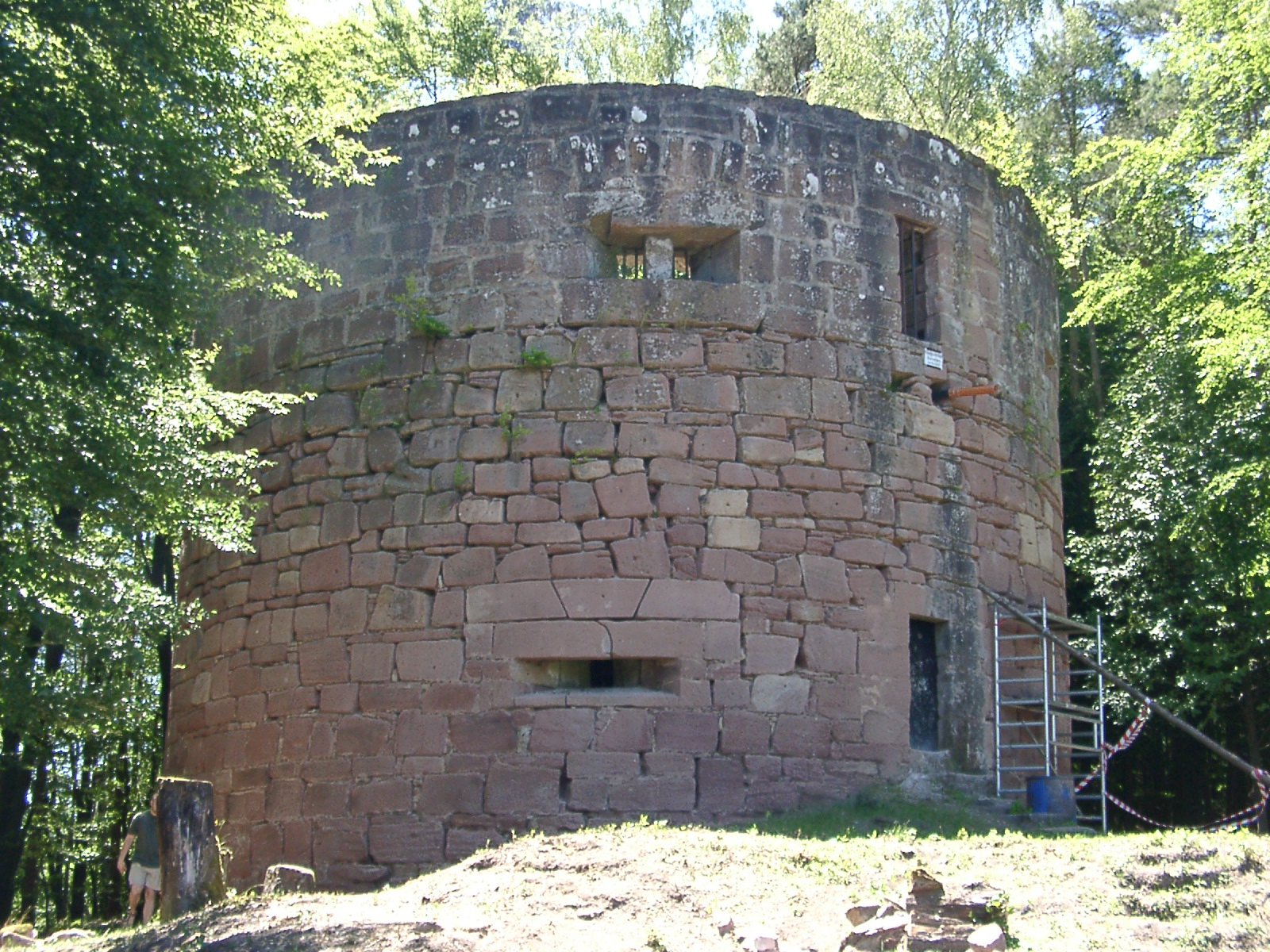
- Little France fort on the northern slope of the Nestelberg

Highest point
- Elevation: 402 m above sea level (NN) (1,319 ft)
- Coordinates: 49°06′00″N 7°51′28″E

Geography
- Location within Rhineland-Palatinate
- Location: Palatine Forest, Rhineland-Palatinate, Germany
- Parent range: Wasgau

Geology
- Rock type: Bunter Sandstone

The Nestelberg is a 402-metre-high hill in the Dahner Felsenland in the Wasgau, a region that comprises the southern part of the Palatine Forest in the German state of Rhineland-Palatinate and the northern part of the French Vosges in the departments of Bas-Rhin and Moselle.

== Geography ==
The Nestelberg lies south of Berwartstein Castle and left of the Erlenbach stream in the parish of Erlenbach bei Dahn in the county of Südwestpfalz. The hill is covered in woodland and may be climbed on a footpath, very steep in places, which starts around 200 metres below in the Erlenbach valley.

== History ==
The hill became important in the Late Middle Ages when an outwork known as Little France (Klein-Frankreich) was built in 1484 as a hillside fort at 322 metres above sea level on the northern slope of the Nestelberg at the instigation of the castellan of the Berwartstein, Marshal Hans von Trotha. Only 370 metres in a direct line from the main castle, the fortification enabled the Leichenfeld, a field which was the only past where cannon at that time could be set up near the Berwartstein, to be brought into a crossfire from the north (Berwartstein) and south (Little France).
