= Little France (castle) =

- Klein-Frankreich, Thurm Frankreich
- Erlenbach bei Dahn
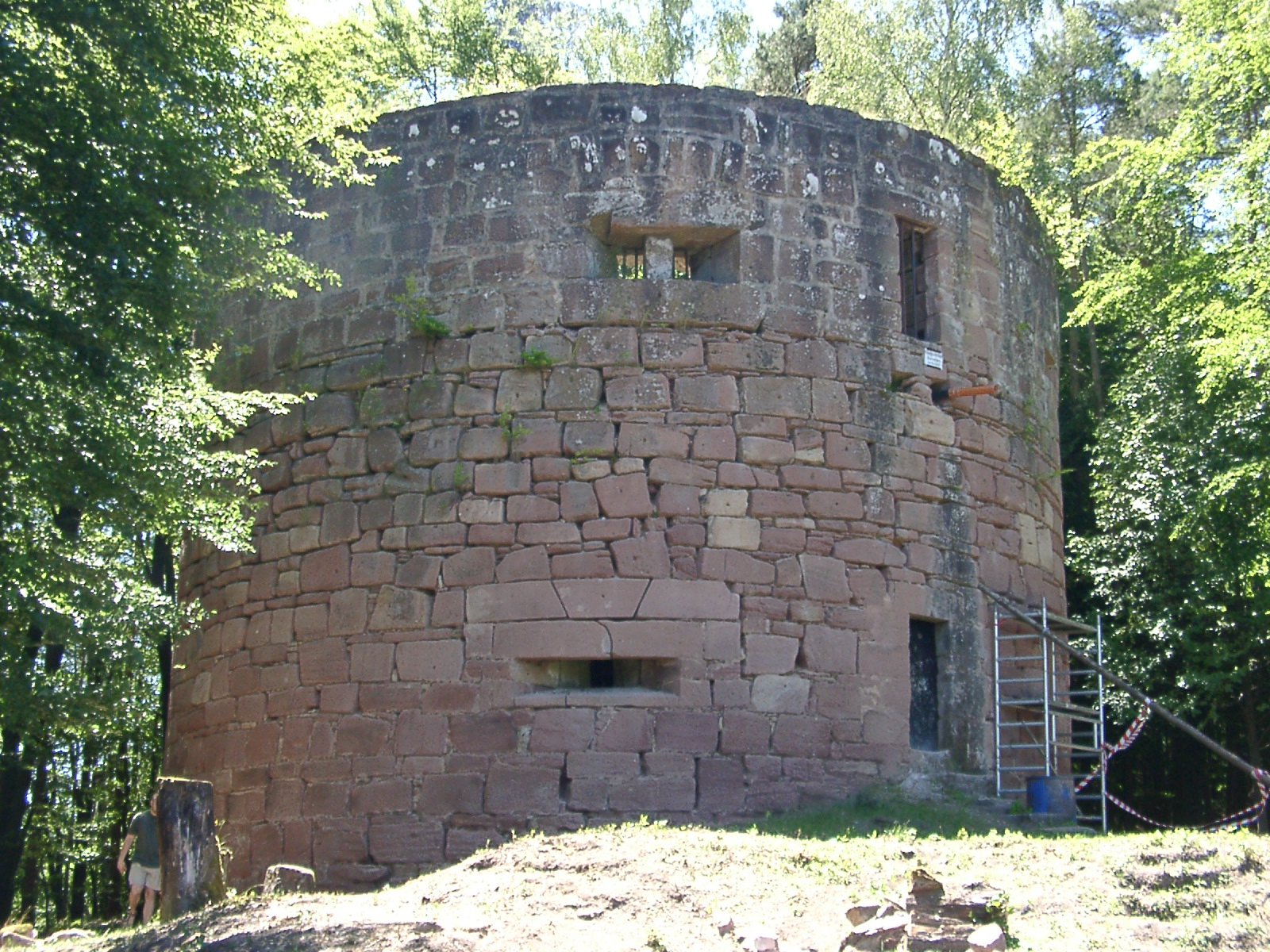
- Remains of the battery tower at Little France

Site information
- Type: hill castle, hillside castle
- Code: DE-RP
- Condition: ruin

Location
- Coordinates: 49°06′18″N 7°51′46″E
- Height: 322 m above sea level (NN)

Site history
- Built: 1484

Garrison information
- Occupants: knights

Little France (German: Klein-Frankreich or Kleinfrankreich) is the ruin of a hillside fort in the German region of Dahner Felsenland. It lies above the village of Erlenbach bei Dahn in the county of Südwestpfalz in the state of Rhineland-Palatinate.

== Location ==
The fort lies at a height of 322 m above sea level (NN) on the northern slopes of the 402-metre-high Nestelberg. Around 370 metres to the north, on the other side of a saddle-shaped side valley, is Berwartstein Castle. In the west, where it branches off the main valley formed by the water meadows of the Erlenbach, the side valley broadens into a bowl that is known locally as the Leichenfeld ("corpse field").

== History ==
How Little France came to have such an unusual name is still unclear today; although from the castle at Berwartstein it lay in the direction of France, whose present border is only 7 kilometres away. In 1511 it was recorded as Thurm Frankreich ("France Tower").

The little castle was erected in 1484 as an outpost of the Berwartstein by the knight Hans von Trotha, later also known in the local dialect as Hans Trapp. This outwork enabled a piece of open ground known as the Leichenfeld ("Corpse Field") to be covered by a crossfire from two directions: from the north (Berwartstein) and from the south (Little France). This field was the only place where the cannons of that period could be deployed against the Berwartstein. In fact, until 1591 when the castle burned down as the result of a lightning strike and remained unoccupied for three centuries, the Berwartstein was never conquered despite numerous attempts, something which may be attributed to the existence of the auxiliary castle.

After the main castle had been empty for decades, the outwork was badly damaged in the 17th century, either during the Thirty Years' War or the War of the Palatine Succession. A restoration of the remains began in 2005.

== Layout ==
The base of a large battery tower, with a diameter of 14 metres and height about the same, has been well preserved. Its walls are 3.20 metres thick; and some of the stone ashlars show evidence of lifting marks, possibly from a three-legged lewis. The ground floor wall is pierced by three embrasures, the first floor has four. These openings could have been used by arquebuses and small firearms. The roof platform was wide enough to deploy culverins whose longer barrels increased their accuracy.

North of the tower are the remains of an enceinte which used to surround it, and immediately to the northeast is a castle well, now filled in.

Little France was linked to the main castle by a tunnel which, for much of its length, was a concealed ditch covered by stone slabs and concealed with earth and vegetation; it has almost entirely collapsed.

== Literature ==
- Marco Bollheimer (2011), Felsenburgen im Burgenparadies Wasgau–Nordvogesen (in German) (3. ed.), Karlsruhe: Selbstverlag, pp. 76–77, ISBN 978-3-9814506-0-6
- Jürgen Keddigkeit, Ulrich Burkhart, Rolf Übel: Pfälzisches Burgenlexikon. Vol. 3, I – N. Kaiserslautern, 2005.
- Günter Stein: Burgen und Schlösser in der Pfalz. Frankfurt/Main, 1976.
