= Hans von Trotha =

15th-century German knight

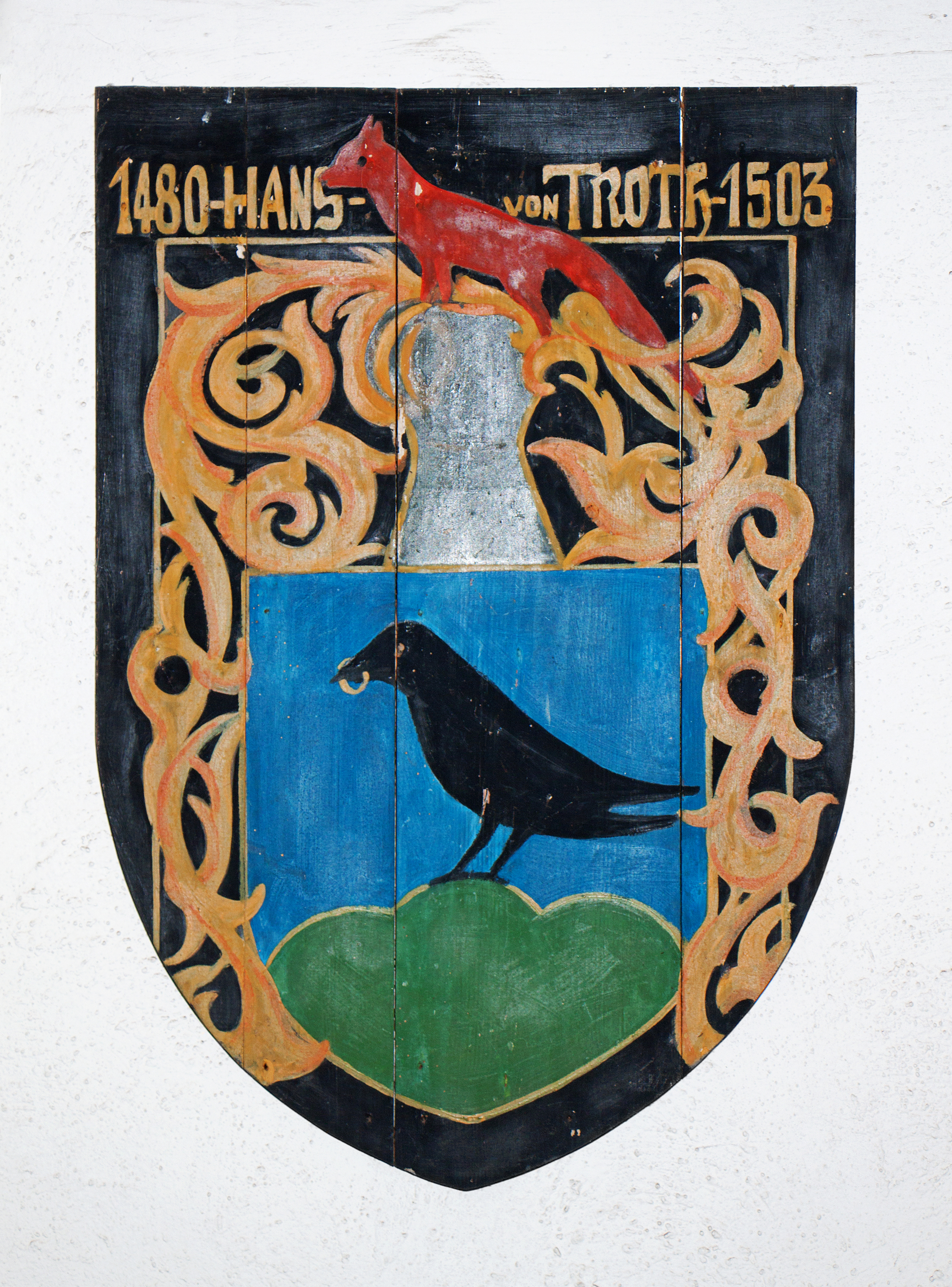
Coat of arms of Hans von Trotha

Hans von Trotha, also known as Hans Trapp (c. 1450 – 1503), was a German knight and marshal of the prince-elector of the Palatinate. He also bore the French honorary title of a Chevalier d’Or. In 1480, the elector enfeoffed him with the two castles of Berwartstein and Grafendahn which lay in the South Palatine part of the Wasgau region within the Palatinate Forest. In local folklore he is known as Hans Trapp or, more rarely, Hans Trott.

== Family ==
Hans von Trotha was born into the aristocratic Trotha family who came from the area of the present-day county of Saalekreis, and was the fourth son of the Archbishop of Magdeburg's marshal, Thilo von Trotha. He was probably born in the mid-15th century in Krosigk (today in Saxony-Anhalt). His exact date of birth is not known, but he was the younger brother of Thilo von Trotha, the Bishop of Merseburg who was born in 1443.

Hans only had one son, Christoph, who succeeded his father as the lord of Berwartstein Castle. Because Christoph had no male issue, the line was extinguished upon his death in 1545 and the estate went to his son-in-law from the Alsatian House of Fleckenstein.

== Life ==
=== Expansion of Berwartstein Castle ===
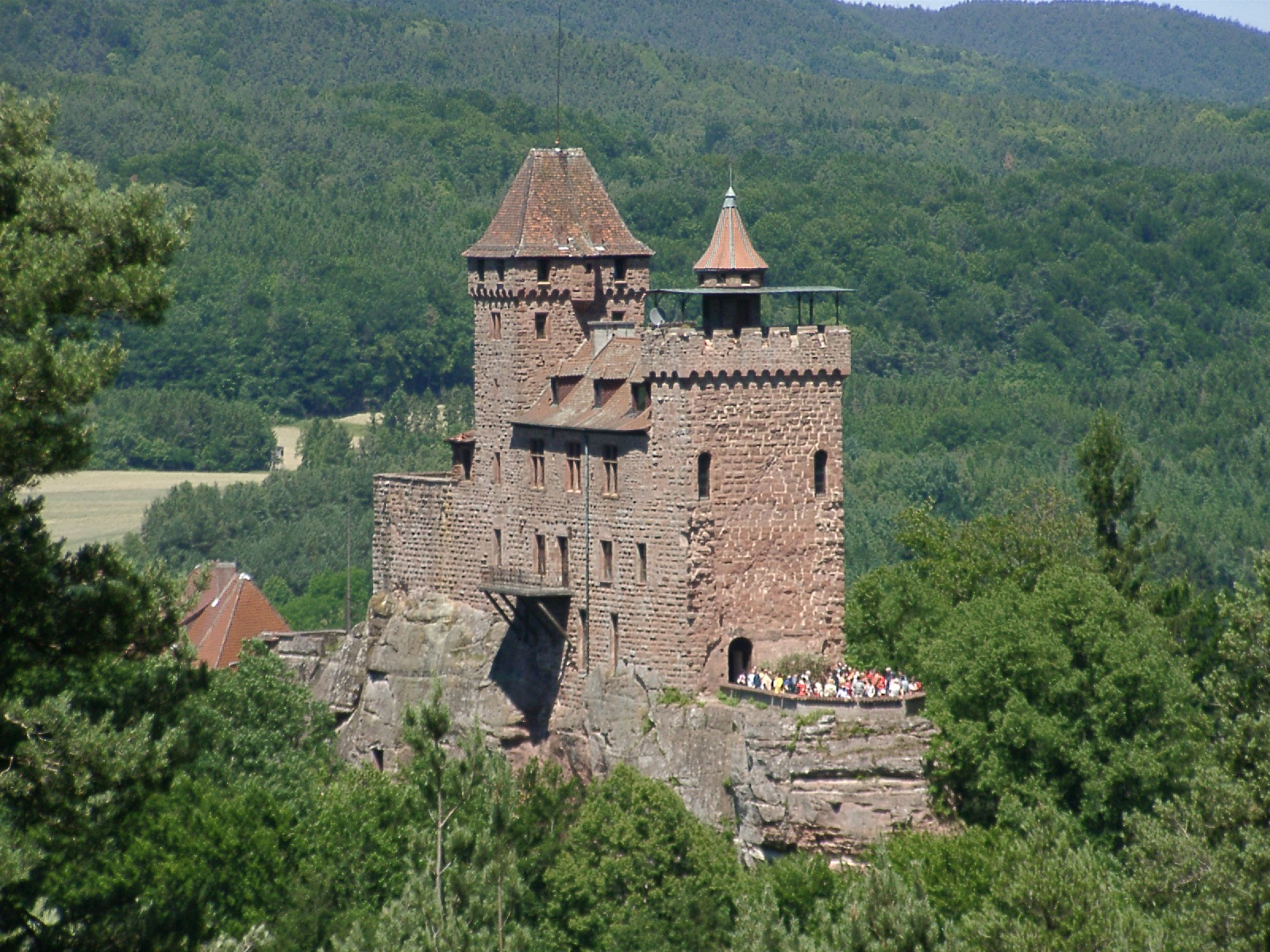
The Berwartstein on the one side...

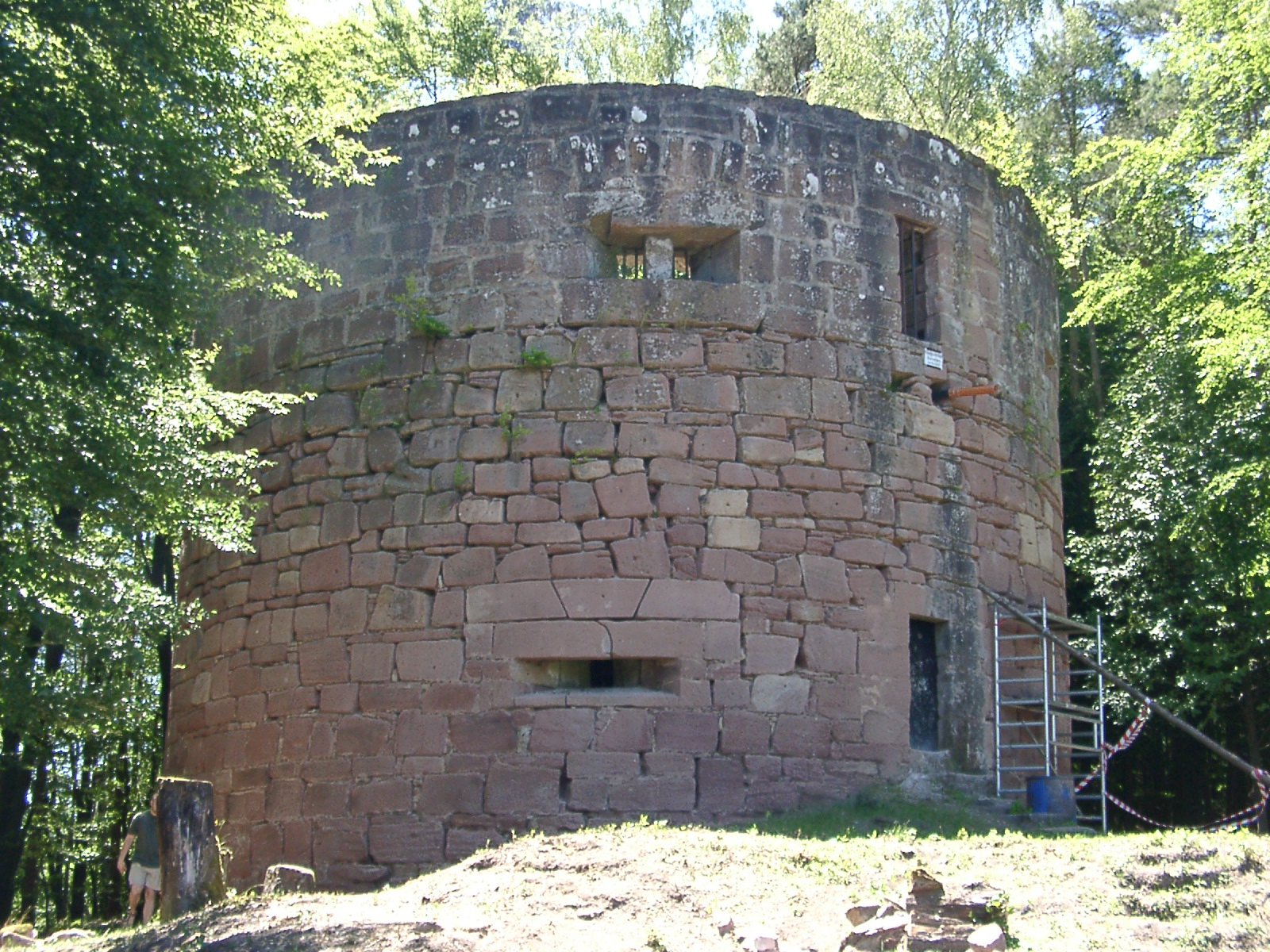
...and the "Little France" outwork on the other

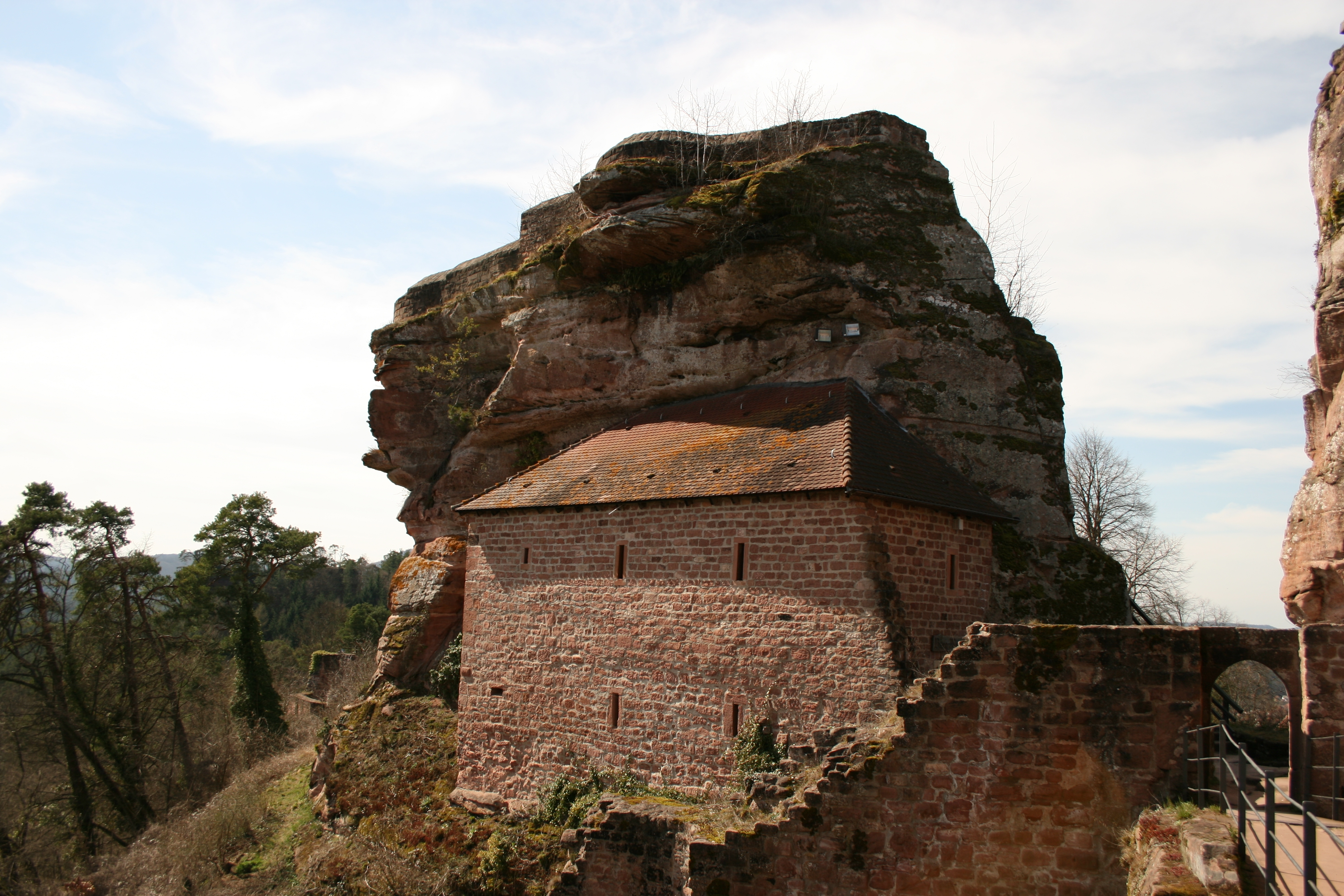
Grafendahn Castle

As one of the younger sons of an aristocratic family, Hans entered the service of the electors and counts palatine of the Rhine in Heidelberg as a young man in the late 1470s. The link to Electoral Palatinate probably came about as a result of Archbishop John of Magdeburg, the patron of Bishop Thilo von Trotha. Hans clearly proved himself, because by 1480 the Elector, Philip the Sincere, who was about the same age, gave him the hereditary fiefs of two castles in the Wasgau on hereditary, namely Berwartstein, "including its belongings", and Grafendahn.

Within four years, the Lord of Berwartstein had expanded it into a fortress, which was impregnable for its time. He achieved this inter alia by erecting the outwork of Little France (Burg Klein-Frankreich) in 1484 on the northern slope of the hill opposite, the Nestelberg. The site consisted primarily of a powerful battery tower, on the platform of which long-barreled culverins could be set up. This made it possible for an accurate crossfire to be brought to bear on any force attempting to besiege Berwartstein.

Hans showed no interest, however, in the castle of Grafendahn, six kilometres to the northwest. It was probably already crumbling when he received it; by 1500 it was described as "uninhabitable". The reason for its poor condition seemed to be that Grafendahn had been designed from the outset as a Ganerbenburg which had always had joint owners with no one person taking responsibility for its maintenance.

=== Feud with Weissenburg Abbey ===
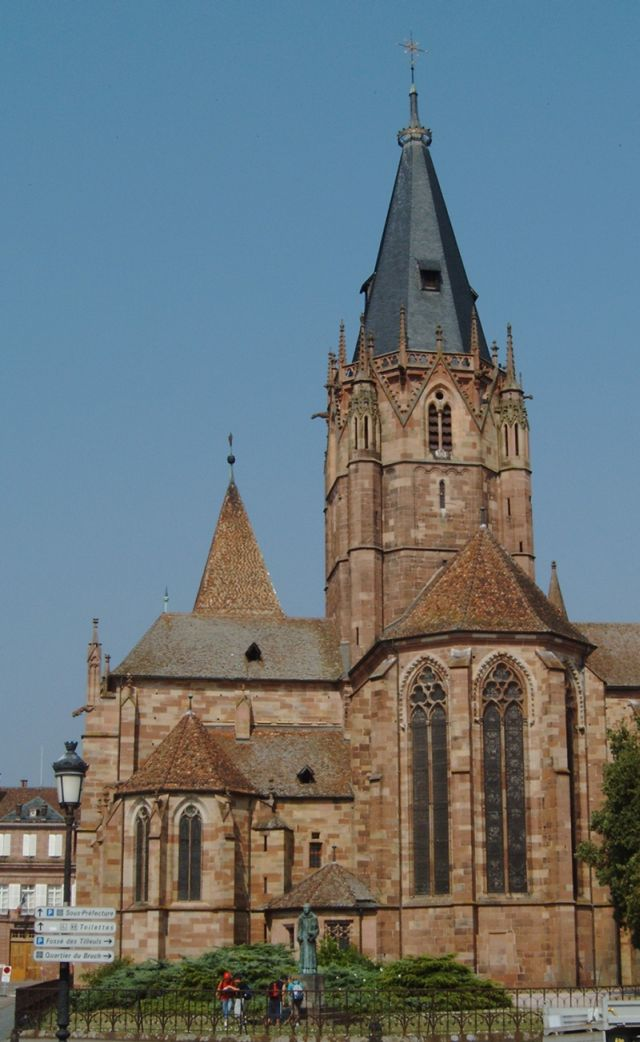
The old abbey church of Weissenburg

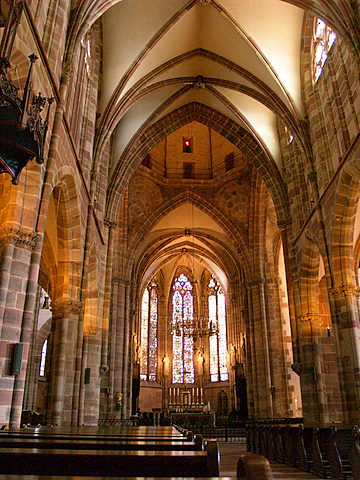
Interior of the old abbey church

Hans became well known as a result of his subsequent feud with Henry, Abbot of the Order of Benedictine monks at Weissenburg Abbey. The reason was that the Berwartstein and other property, the so-called "belongings", were originally the property of the monastery and, in the abbot's view, the Electoral Palatinate had not acquired the castle legitimately because, in 1453, the monastery had only intended to place it under the protection of the Elector. When, in 1485, Hans finally demanded the "belongings" (i.e. the estate) of the castle, the abbot turned to the Elector for protection. However, the Elector did not support the monastery as expected; first he made excuses, then he elevated Hans to the rank of marshal and sold him the entire disputed possession.

When the dispute with the monastery reached its peak, Hans had the nearby Wieslauter river dammed and so deprived the downstream town of Weissenburg (now French Wissembourg) of its water supply. The lord built the dam near the village of Bobenthal, five kilometres south of the Berwartstein. There, eight kilometers above Weissenburg, the little river flows through a narrow gap near the Bobenthaler Knopf (534 m, left of the Wieslauter on the Palatine side) and the Dürrenberg (520 m, on the right, on the Alsatian side). A small reservoir was formed, which flooded the water meadows in front of Bobenthal. Following complaints by the abbot, Hans tore down the dam as planned and caused a huge flood in Weissenburg that devastated the town economically.

=== Imperial ban and anathema ===
Baron von Trotha now engaged in open warfare against the abbot. When even the invocation of the Emperor could not persuade him to stop, the abbot turned in 1491 to Pope Innocent VIII. Eight years later, Hans was summoned to the papal court by Innocent's successor, Alexander VI, to be questioned about his loyalty to the Church. But he refused to go to Rome and, instead, wrote a letter to the Pope. In it, he emphasized his Christian faith on the one hand, but accused the Borgia Pope with obscure charges of immorality on the other. An anathema was then issued against Trotha which resulted in his excommunication. In order not to suffer the same fate, his former patron, the Elector, renounced his vassal. In 1496, the Roman-German king and later Emperor Maximilian I also pronounced the imperial ban on von Trotha.

However, the Elector only distanced himself from von Trotha publicly and sent him to the French royal court during the Italian Wars because of his diplomatic skills. It was whilst he was there that the French king, Louis XII, awarded him the Chevalier d'Or knighthood.

=== Death and rehabilitation ===
Hans survived the sanctions of the Emperor and Pope and, two years later, after he had died on 26 October 1503 at Berwartstein Castle of natural causes, they were posthumously lifted. The knight was interred in St. Anne's Chapel in Niederschlettenbach, four kilometres from Berwartstein above the confluence of the Erlenbach and the Wieslauter. In 1967 the von Trotha family had a memorial tablet placed in the chapel.

== Significance ==
The events of von Trotha's feud with the abbey are depicted in the great hall of Berwartstein Castle. The hall is used as a restaurant that can seat 150 people, but it is open to the public to visit.

Hans von Trotha, who was about 2 metres tall and even by today's standards would have been an imposing figure, became a local legend in the Palatinate region under the popular corrupted name of "Hans Trapp", or occasionally "Hans Trott". He was not only described later as a robber baron, but over the course of time became portrayed as a figure of terror for children who, as the "Black Knight" (schwarzer Ritter), was a restless spirit who stalked through the Wasgau at night. Even in the Legend of the Jungfernsprung his name was associated with the fiend who wanted to take the young maiden's virginity.

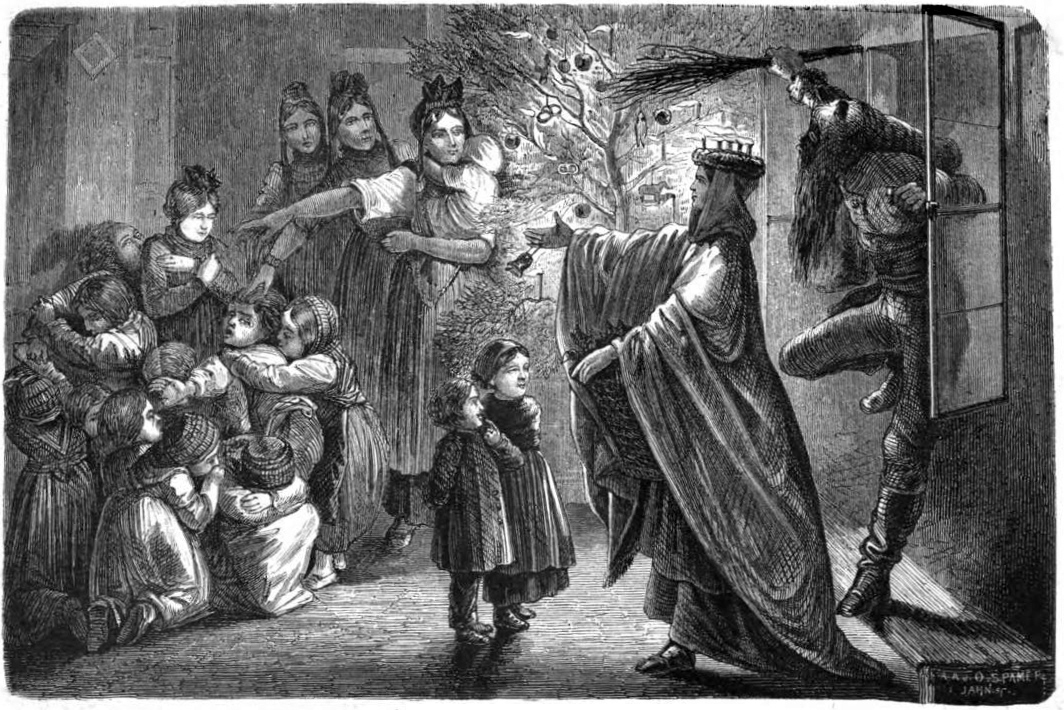
The Christ Child and Hans Trapp in Alsace (1863 illustration)

In neighbouring Alsace at the time of Saint Nicholas the name of Hans Trapp was used to frighten children and he was the one who accompanied the saint, not the usual figure of Knecht Ruprecht. The appearance and dress of Hans Trapp (white beard, pointed hat and rod) are described in an Alemannic German poem from the Alsace:

D’r Hans Trapp
Schoi, do kummt d’r Hans Trapp.
Ar het a scheni Zepfelkapp’
Un a Bart wiss wie a Schimmel.
Ar kummt vum schena Starnehimmel
Un bringt da Kinder a Ruada,
Wu net dien singe un bata.
Schoi, Hans Trapp, mir sin so klein
Un brav un folje d’heim.
Müesch net kumme mit dim Stacka,
Denn mir kenne singe un oi bata.

Translated to German
Schau, da kommt der Hans Trapp.
Er hat eine schöne Zipfelkapp’
Und einen Bart weiß wie ein Schimmel.
Er kommt vom schönen Sternenhimmel
Und bringt den Kindern eine Rute,
Die nicht tun singen und beten.
Schau, Hans Trapp, wir sind so klein
Und brav und folgen daheim.
Musst nicht kommen mit dei’m Stecken,
Denn wir können singen und auch beten.

Translated to English
Look, there comes Hans Trapp.
He has a nice pointed hat
And a beard white like a roan.
He comes from the beautiful starry sky
And brings children a rod
Who do not do singing and praying.
Look, Hans Trapp, we are so small
And good and obedient at home.
Shouldn't come with your stick
Because we can sing and pray too.
