= Erlenbach (Lauter) =

River in Germany

- View from Berwartstein Castle, the Erlenbach flowing left of the street (dark blue)

Location
- Country: Germany
- Location: Wasgau, Rhineland-Palatinate
- Reference no.: DE: 23728

Physical characteristics
- Source
  - location: The Löffelsberg near Oberschlettenbach
  - coordinates: 49°09′01″N 7°53′20″E
  - elevation: 272 m above sea level (NN)
- Mouth
  - location: Wieslauter in Niederschlettenbach
  - coordinates: 49°05′02″N 7°50′53″E
  - elevation: 203 m above sea level (NN)
- Length: 9.04 km
- Basin size: 18.815 km²

Basin features
- Progression: Lauter→ Rhine→ North Sea
- Landmarks: Villages: Oberschlettenbach, Vorderweidenthal, Erlenbach, Niederschlettenbach

The Erlenbach (German: [ˈɛʁlənbax]) is a stream, over 9 km long, in the South Palatine Wasgau region of the German state of Rhineland-Palatinate. It is a left tributary of the Lauter which, here in its upper reaches is still called the Wieslauter.

== Geography ==
=== Course ===
The Erlenbach has a main source and a rather smaller subsidiary source, which are only a few hundred metres from one another on the eastern flank of the 445-metre-high Löffelsberg. They are located in the Wasgau, which comprises the southern part of the Palatinate Forest and the adjoining northern part of the French Vosges Mountains.

Initially the stream flows eastwards passing through the parish of Oberschlettenbach, its two headstreams meeting after 2 km, the smaller brook emptying from the right into the bigger one. The combined Erlenbach swings south and passes the villages of Vorderweidenthal and Erlenbach. In Niederschlettenbach it discharges into the Wieslauter from the left.

=== Tributaries ===
- Wüstenborn (right)
- Kleisterbach (right), 1.4 km
- Zimbach (right)
- Eisenbach (right), 1.4 km

== Sights ==
=== Wildlife park, Lindelbrunn Castle ===
Immediately east of the source area lies the Südliche Weinstraße Wildlife Park and the castle of Lindelbrunn.

=== Drachenfels Castle ===
Drachenfels Castle, 3 km west of the middle reaches of the stream, was destroyed in 1523, because part of it had belonged to the rebel knight Francis of Sickingen.

=== Berwartstein Castle ===
The Berwartstein, still occupied and managed today, was once the possession of the knight, Hans von Trotha who, as Hans Trapp has been absorbed into local legend. The castle rises above the left bank of the Erlenbach over the village of the same name, whilst on the opposite hillside is the tower of Little France.

=== St. Anne's Chapel ===
Hans von Trotha died in 1503 and was interred in St. Anne's Chapel just above the mouth of the Erlenbach. The chapel was commissioned by the nearby Weissenburg Abbey and was completed in 1462 in order to enable the miners of the iron ore pit at the Bremmelberg the opportunity to go to church. At the end of the 18th century, it was heavily damaged by French Revolutionary troops and was not rebuilt until 1908. Since then it has been the destination of an annual pilgrimage on the last Sunday in July.

== See also ==
- List of rivers of Rhineland-Palatinate
