= Erlenbach bei Dahn =

- Municipality
- Coat of arms

- Location of Erlenbach bei Dahn within Südwestpfalz district
- Interactive map of Erlenbach bei Dahn
- Location within Germany Location within Rhineland-Palatinate
- Coordinates: 49°06′45″N 7°51′43″E
- Country: Germany
- State: Rhineland-Palatinate
- District: Südwestpfalz
- Municipal assoc.: Dahner Felsenland

Government
  - Mayor (2019–24): Dirk Eichberger

Area
  - Total: 12.99 km^{2} (5.02 sq mi)
- Elevation: 250 m (820 ft)

Population (2025-12-31)
  - Total: 338
  - Density: 26.0/km^{2} (67.4/sq mi)
- Time zone: UTC+01:00 (CET)
  - Summer (DST): UTC+02:00 (CEST)
- Postal codes: 76891
- Dialling codes: 06398
- Vehicle registration: PS
- Website: www.erlenbach.net

Erlenbach bei Dahn (German pronunciation: [ˈɛʁlənbax baɪ ˈdaːn], lit. 'Erlenbach near Dahn') is a municipality in Südwestpfalz district, in Rhineland-Palatinate, western Germany.

Above the village is Berwartstein Castle on one side of the Erlenbach stream and the outwork Little France on the other.

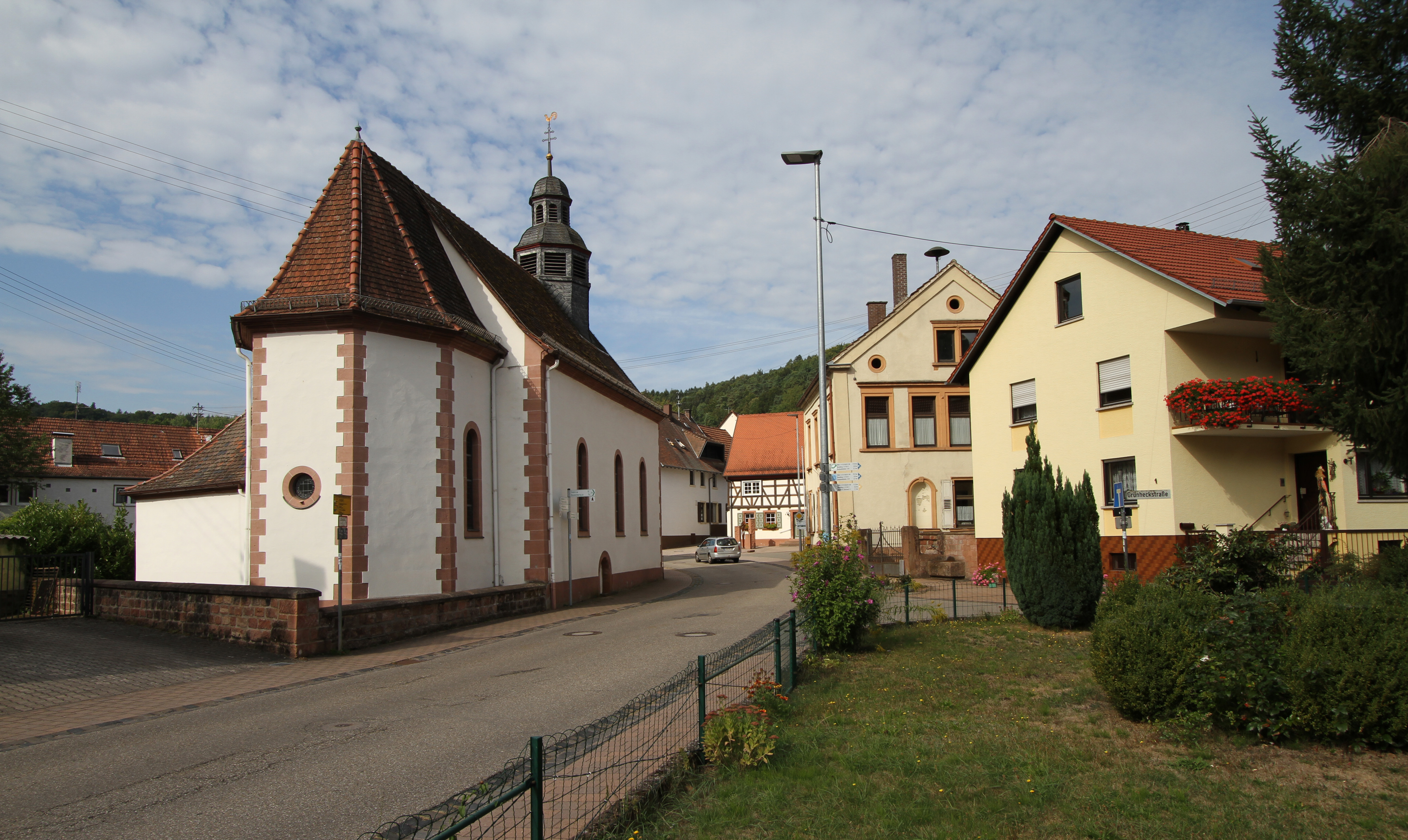
Church Mariae Himmelfahrt and St. Aegidius
