= Berwartstein Castle =

- Burg Berwartstein
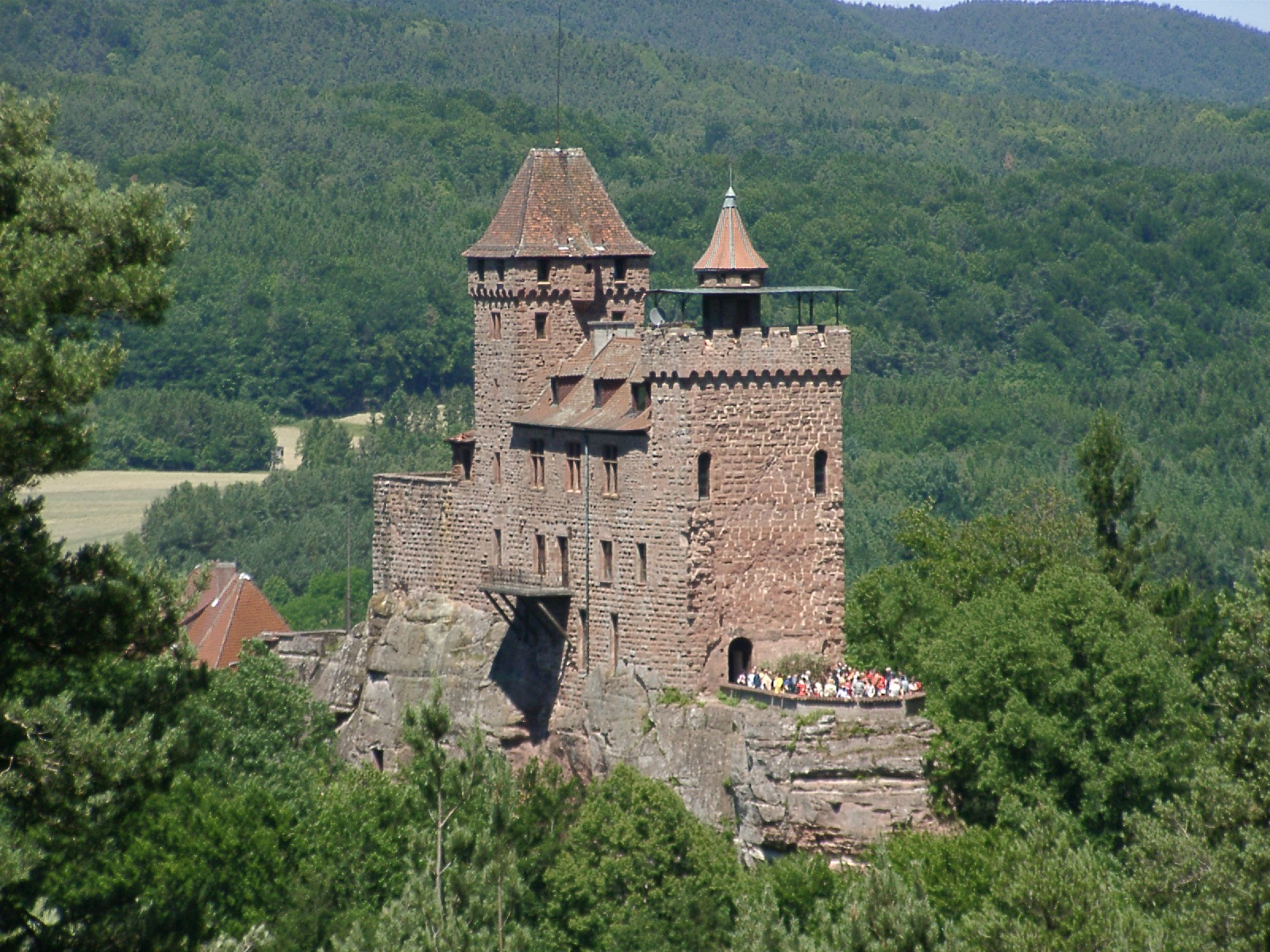
- Berwartstein as seen from the tower of "Little France"
- Interactive map of the Berwartstein Castle area

General information
- Architectural style: medieval castle
- Location: Erlenbach bei Dahn, Rhineland-Palatinate, Germany
- Coordinates: 49.1085°N 7.8627°E
- Construction started: before 1152
- Demolished: Hit by lightning in 1591
- Owner: private

Berwartstein Castle (German: Burg Berwartstein) is a castle in the Wasgau, the southern part of the Palatinate Forest in the state Rhineland-Palatinate in southwestern Germany. It was one of the rock castles that were part of defences of the Palatinate during the Middle Ages. This castle is noted in the publication Works of Preservation of Monuments of Rheinland-Pfalz, which was assembled and edited for the Ministry of Education and Culture. This states that the three prime examples of rock castles in the region are Drachenfels, Altdahn and Berwartstein, castles where the stairs, passages and rooms are carved out of the rock to form part of the accommodation essential to the defence of the castle. Although the Berwartstein appears more complete when compared to the ruins of neighbouring castles, it is only a restoration of the original rock castle. It is the only castle in the Palatinate that was rebuilt and re-inhabited after its demolition.

== History ==
=== Origins ===
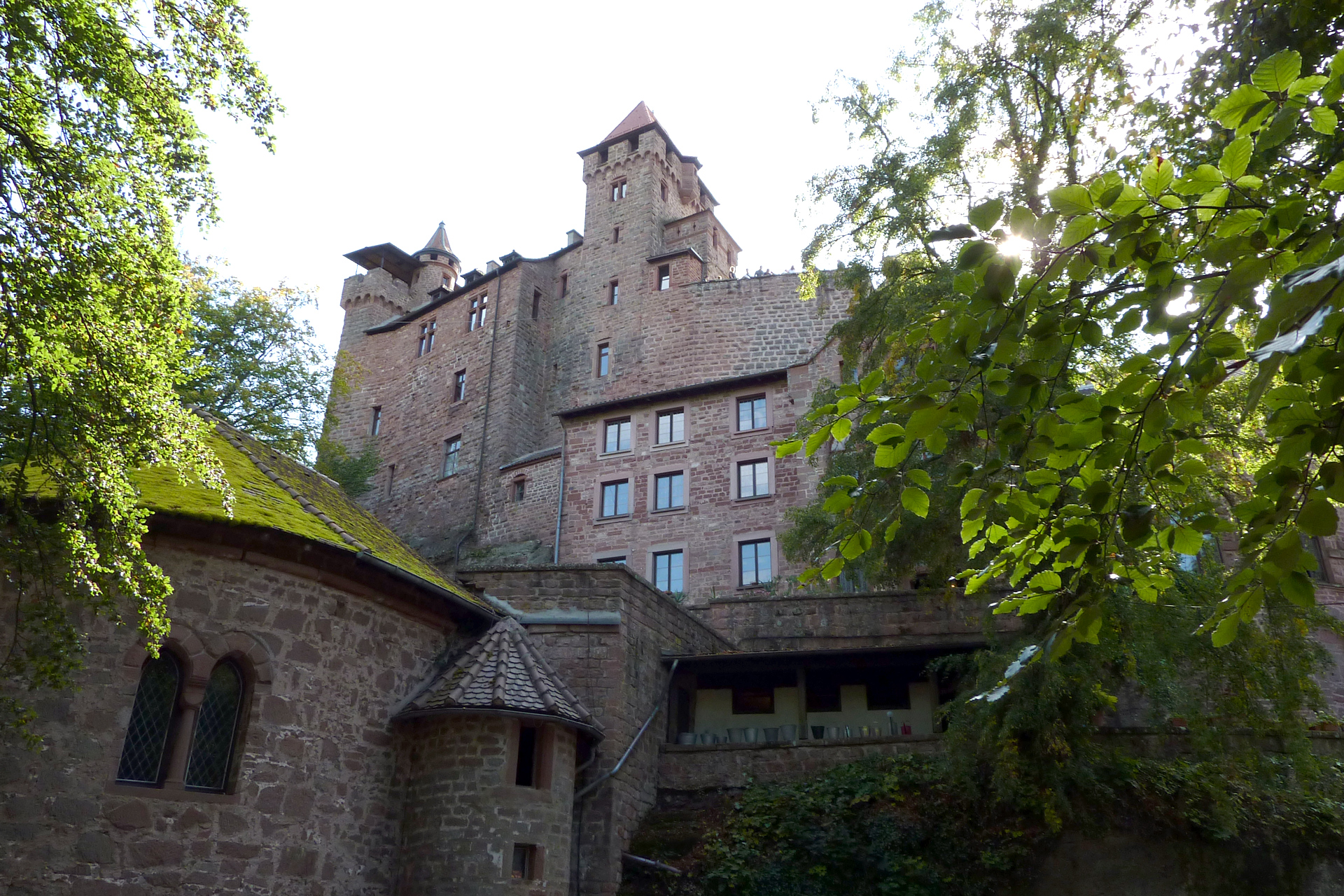
Berwartstein Castle

There is no definite record of the origins of the castle or its name. The name "Berwartstein Castle" is mentioned for the first time in a document dating from 1152, when the castle was granted by Emperor Frederick Barbarossa to Bishop Günther of Speyer.

=== Occupation by robber barons ===
During the 13th century, feudal tenants, who carried the name "von Berwartstein" inhabited the castle, which they used as a base for raids in the manner of robber barons. The imperial cities of Strasbourg and Hagenau joined forces against the von Berwartsteins. Following several weeks of futile attacks against the castle, they succeeded in taking it in 1314, with the help of a traitor. A large amount of booty and about 30 prisoners were taken to Strasbourg. The knights of Berwartstein were permitted to buy the prisoners back for a large ransom. The knights of Berwartstein were forced to sell their castle to the brothers Ort and Ulrich von Weingarten. Four years later the castle became the property of Weissenburg Abbey.

=== Under Weissenburg Abbey ===
The monastery at Weissenburg placed the castle in stewardship and established a feudal system. This allowed for the dismissal of vassals who became too presumptuous. Thus the monastery held possession of the castle for some time. This could have continued indefinitely had the last steward of the castle (Erhard Wyler) not gone too far. When he began feuding with the knights of Drachenfels, the Elector of the Palatinate took the opportunity to bring the Berwartstein Castle under his control.

=== Hans von Trotha ===
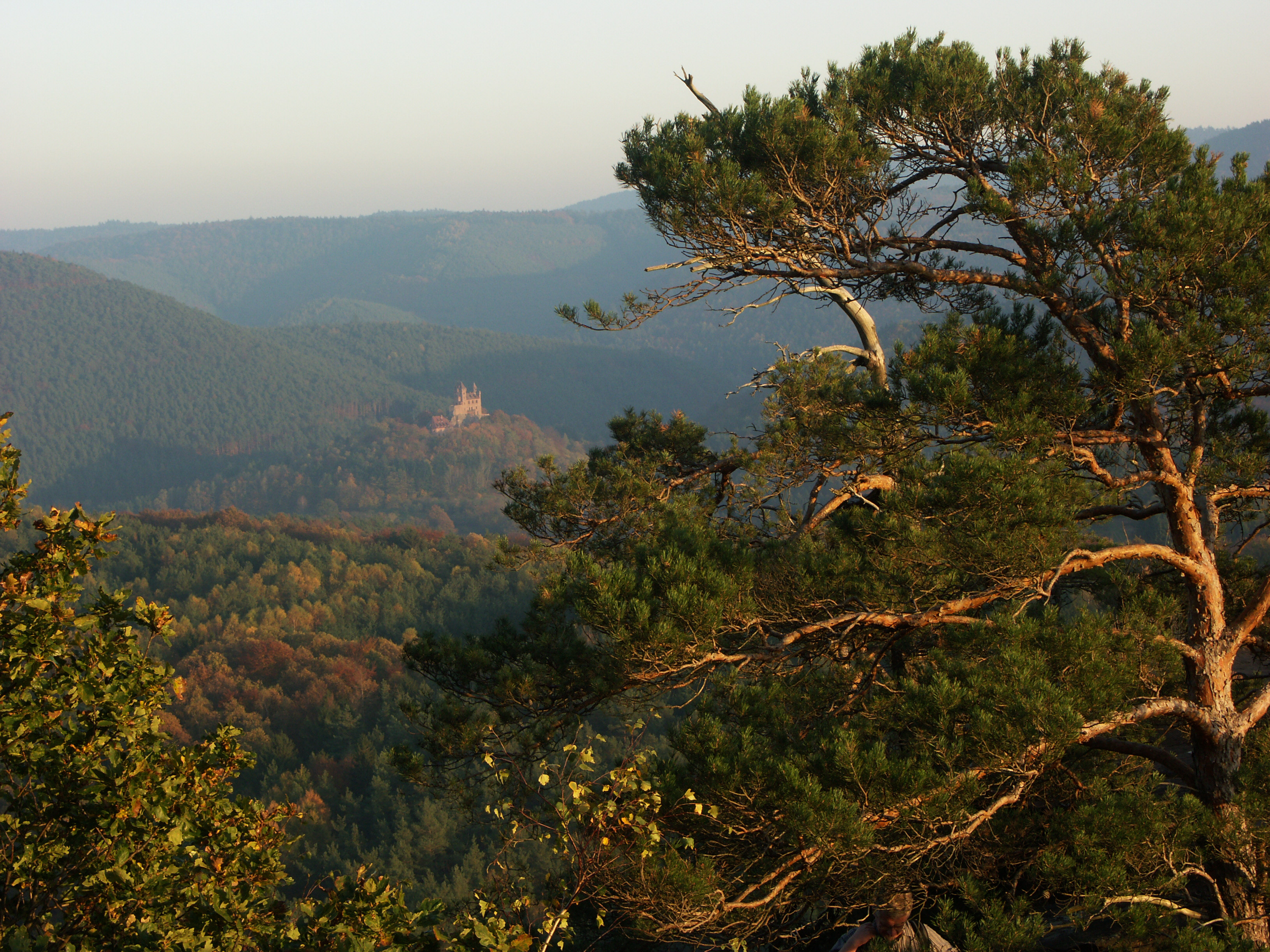
Berwartstein seen from northwest.

Because of his dynastic ambitions, the Elector of the Palatinate wanted to bring all of the Weissenburg estate under his control. To accomplish this, in 1480 he ordered the knight, Hans von Trotha, who was Marshal and Commander in Chief of the Palatinate forces, to try to control Berwartstein. In this way he could enlarge the property at a cost to the Monastery of Weissenburg. For the quarrelsome knight this was a pleasure to fulfil, since this gave him a chance to take personal revenge on the Abbot of Weissenburg. Years before, Abbot Heinrich von Homburg had imposed a church fine on his brother, Bishop Thilo.

As a starting point for this conquering expedition, this experienced warrior first renovated the castle to improve its appearance. He built strong ramparts and bastions as well as the outwork and tower called Little France (castle).

=== Abandonment (1591 - 1893) ===
After von Trotha's death, Berwartstein Castle was inherited by his son Christoph and, when he died, it went to his son-in-law, Friedrich von Fleckenstein and remained in the hands of this family for three generations. During this time, the castle was destroyed by fire in 1591, and, since there is no mention of any attacks, it is presumed that the castle was hit by lightning.

Even though the main sections of the castle were not destroyed by the fire, it stood empty and unused for many years. In the Peace of Westphalia (1648), Berwartstein received special mention, when it was granted to Baron Gerhard von Waldenburg, known as Schenkern, a favorite of Emperor Ferdinand III. Since he did not restore the castle, it fell into ruins.

=== New life ===
A certain Captain Bagienski purchased the castle in 1893. In 1922, it was sold to Aksel Faber of Copenhagen, and thus went into foreign ownership. Since he was seldom in Germany, he asked Alfons Wadlé to be his steward. Later on, Wadlé was able to purchase the castle.

The village of Erlenbach below the castle was completely destroyed during World War II, and its inhabitants sought shelter in the castle. After the war, the roof had gone as well as the woodwork around windows, doors, staircases and other furnishings. Since the castle was not financially supported, Alfons Wadlé went about the renovation himself. At first he was only able to do what was essential to protect the castle from the elements.

== Layout ==
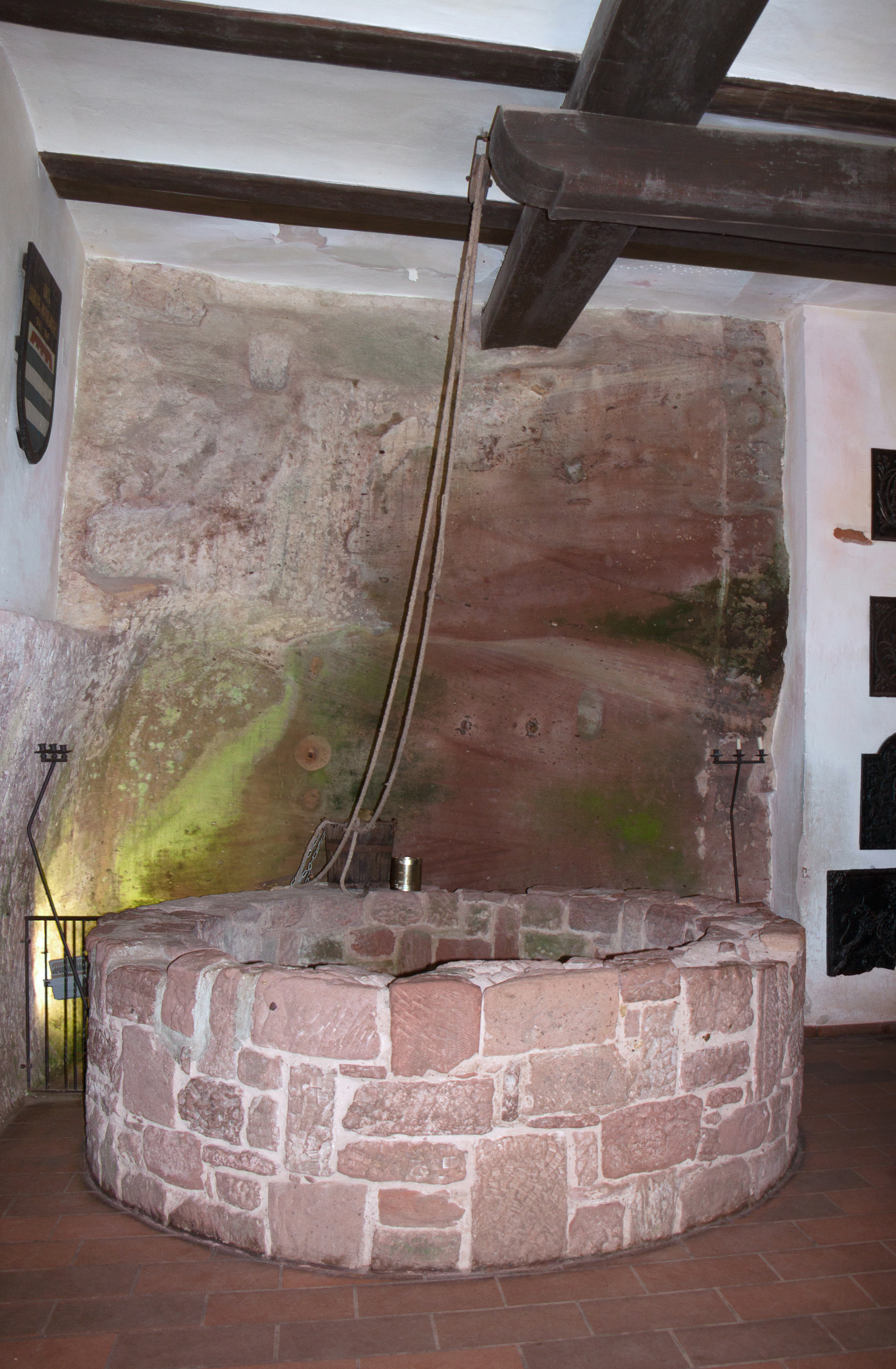
Well

=== Original entrance ===
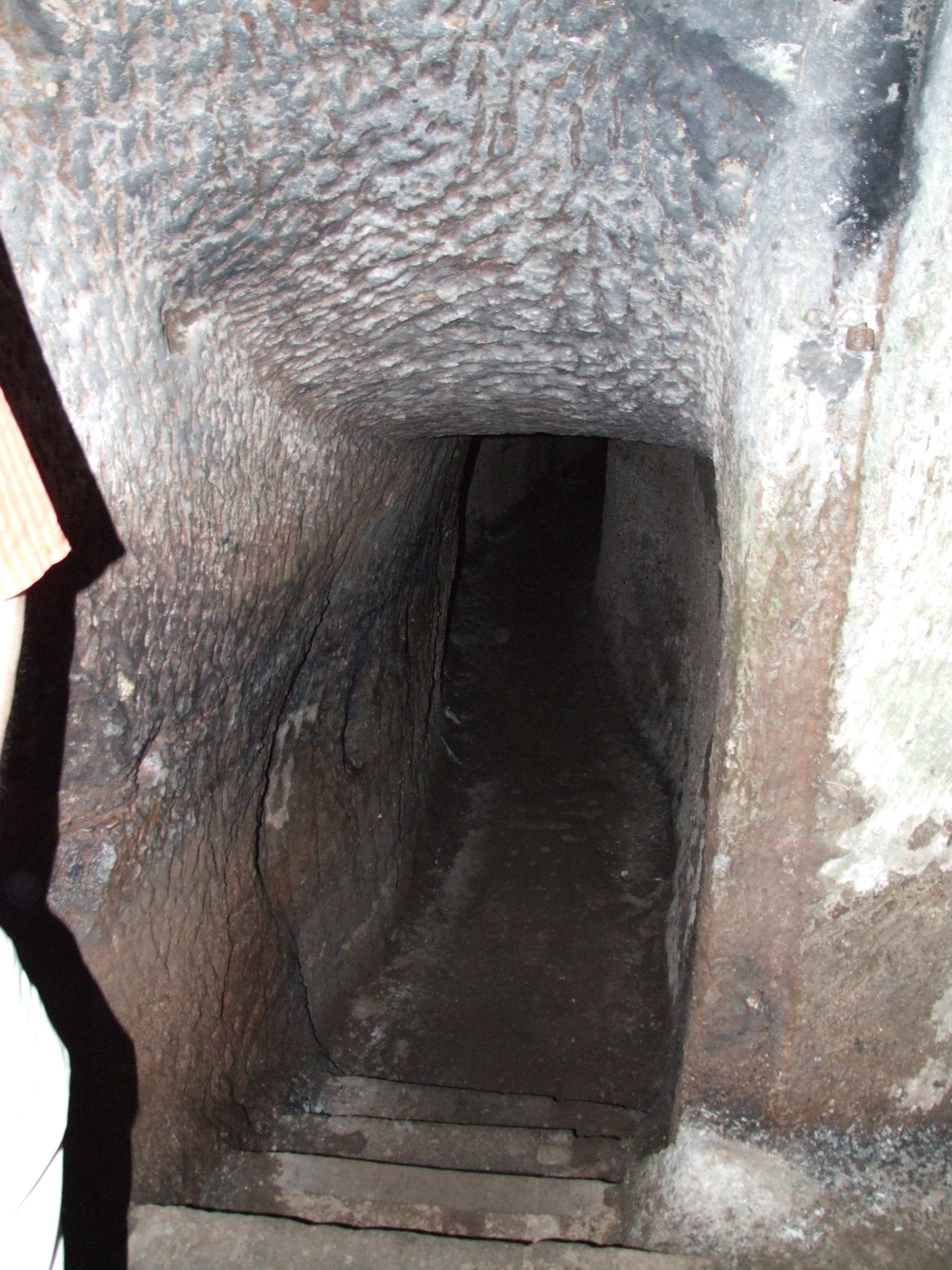
Underground passageways of the Berwartstein

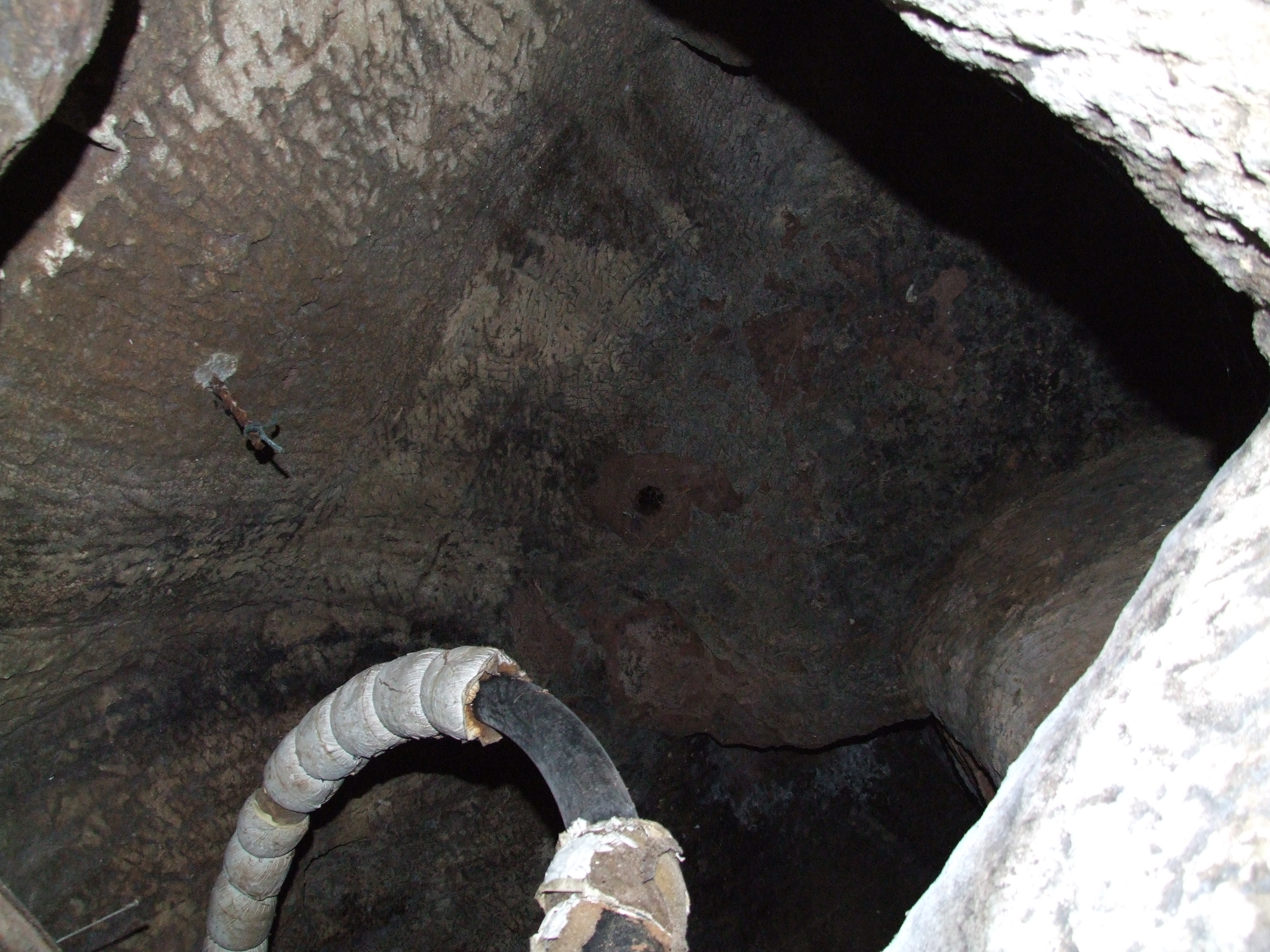
Looking Up, a good defender rising to the underground passageways of the Berwartstein

Berwartstein has an opening on the southeast side of the cliff, commonly referred to as Aufstiegskamin ("entrance chimney"). During the early years of the castle only the rooms and casemates in the upper cliff were complete and the shaft was the only entrance to the castle. To make it easier to ascend the shaft, a portable wooden staircase or rope ladder was placed into the castle. In the event of attack, the staircase or ladder was hoisted up into the castle. This enabled the entrance to be defended by just one man who was supplied with boiling sap, oil or liquid to pour on any intruder attempting to ascend the shaft. This limited access to the castles inner rooms was probably the main reason it was never conquered during the Middle Ages. The narrow, almost vertical cliff on which the castle stands, rises to a height of approximately 45 metres.

=== Well ===
The extremely deep well is one of the castle builders' greatest accomplishments. The well has a diameter of 2 metres (6 ft) and was hacked out of the rock to the bottom of the valley some 104 metres below. This was essential to the castle's survival when under siege.

=== Great Hall ===
The historic Great Hall or Rittersaal has a cross-vaulted ceiling. An engraving on the supporting central pillar shows that it dates to the 13th century. The south wall of the hall is made from rock and includes a hewn-out lift shaft used by the knights of Berwartstein to deliver supplies to the table and deliver food and drink from the kitchen above.

=== Underground passageways ===
Carved out of the cliff and accessible even today are corridors and passageways which used to be part of the large underground defence network. Although not accessible today, there was once a tunnel from the castle to the village below. These tunnels were hewn out with hammer and chisel and partly dug through the soil.

=== Little France outwork ===
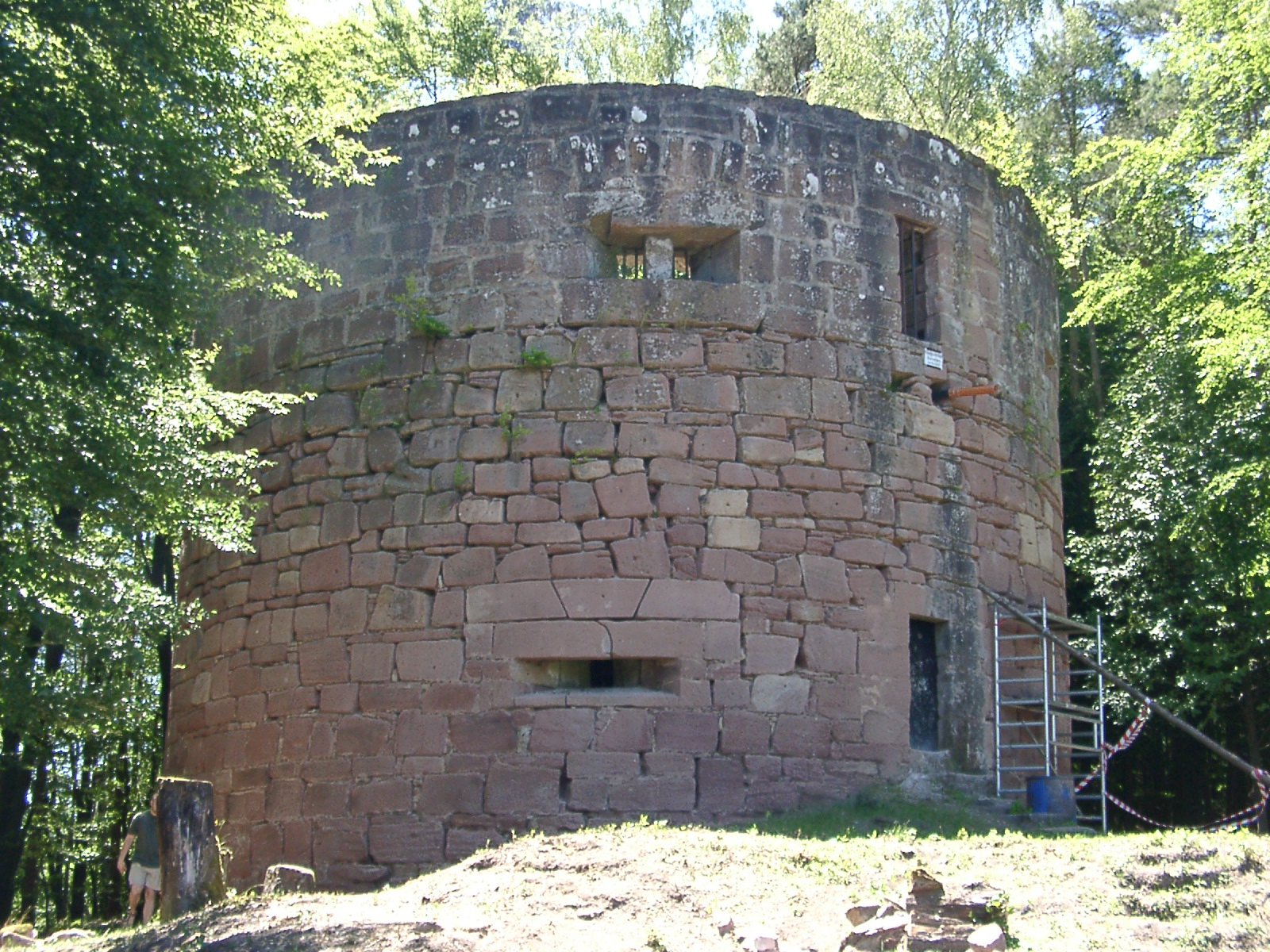
Little France tower

To the south on the opposite side of the valley from the castle on a spur of the Nestelberg can still be seen the tower of Little France. This tower was part of an outwork or small subsidiary castle built by the well known knight and castellan of the Berwartstein, Hans von Trotha. The tower was an important observation post and defensive position, and meant that any attackers would have found themselves caught in a crossfire between the tower and the castle. The open ground in the valley below between the tower and castle still bears the name Leichenfeld ("Corpse Field"), a reference to the battles fought here. There is also evidence of an underground passage between the tower and castle which is no longer accessible today since it has largely collapsed.

== Gallery ==
=== Partial views of the buildings ===
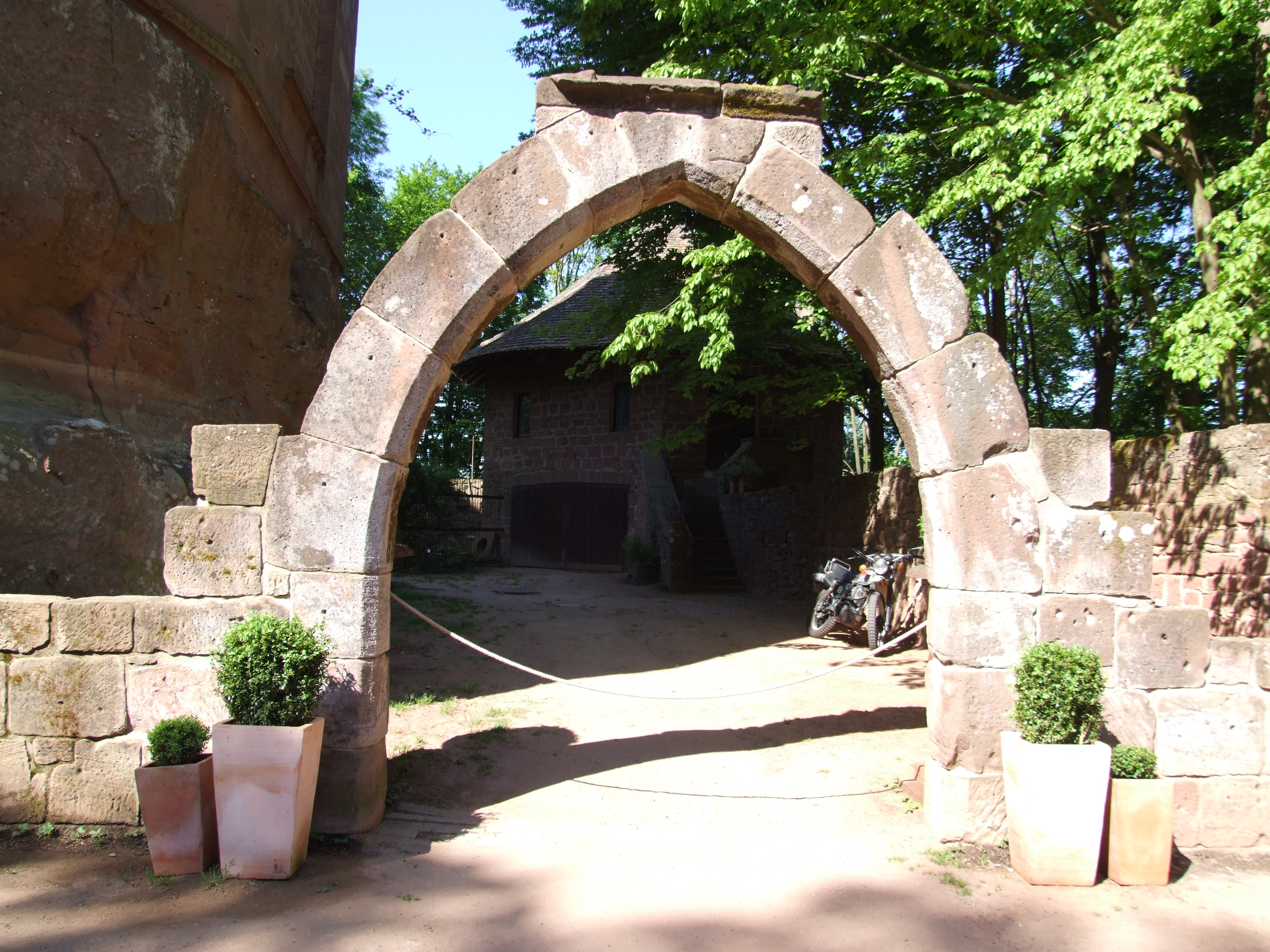
An archway at Berwartstein Castle

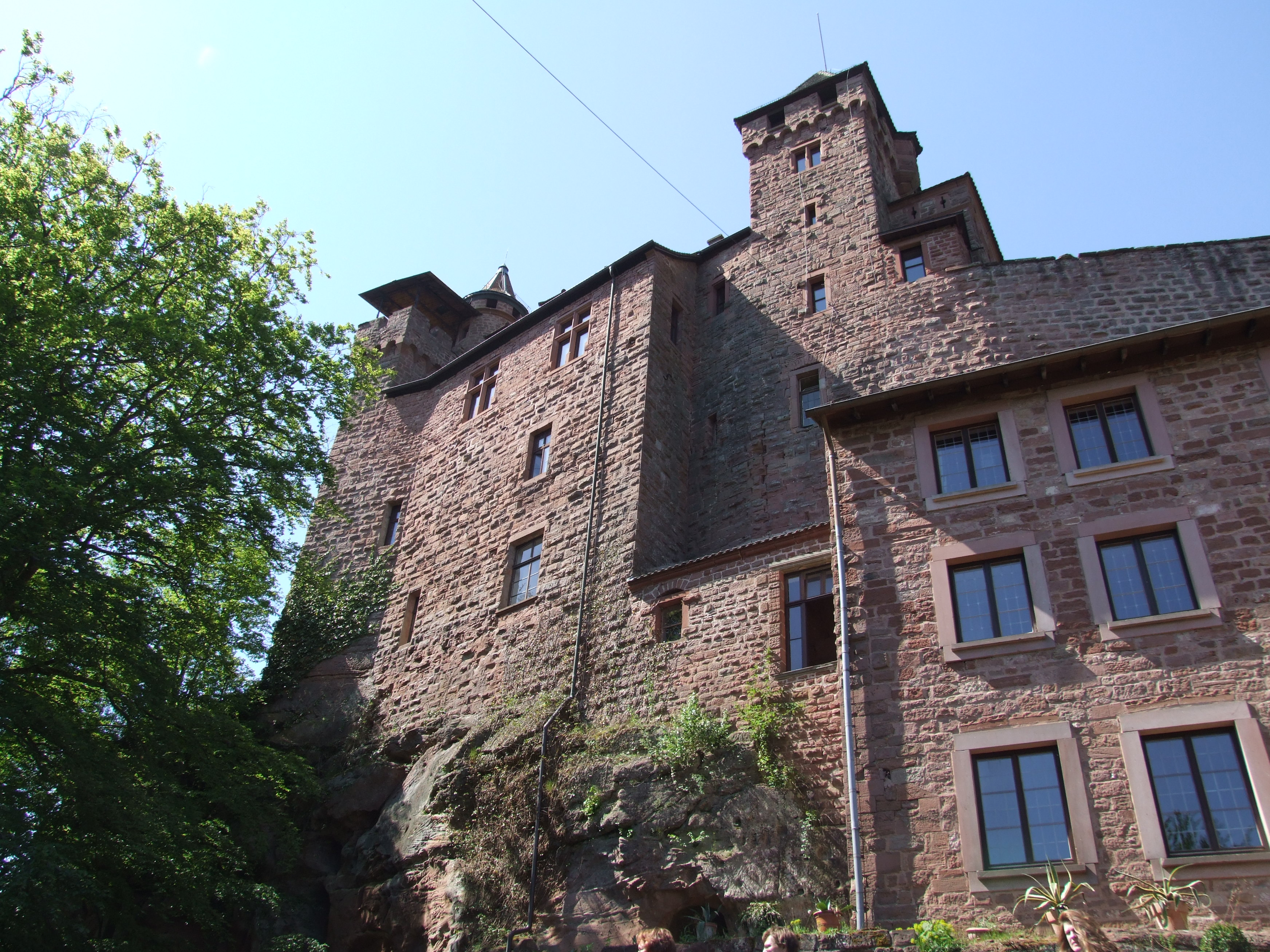
View of the main building

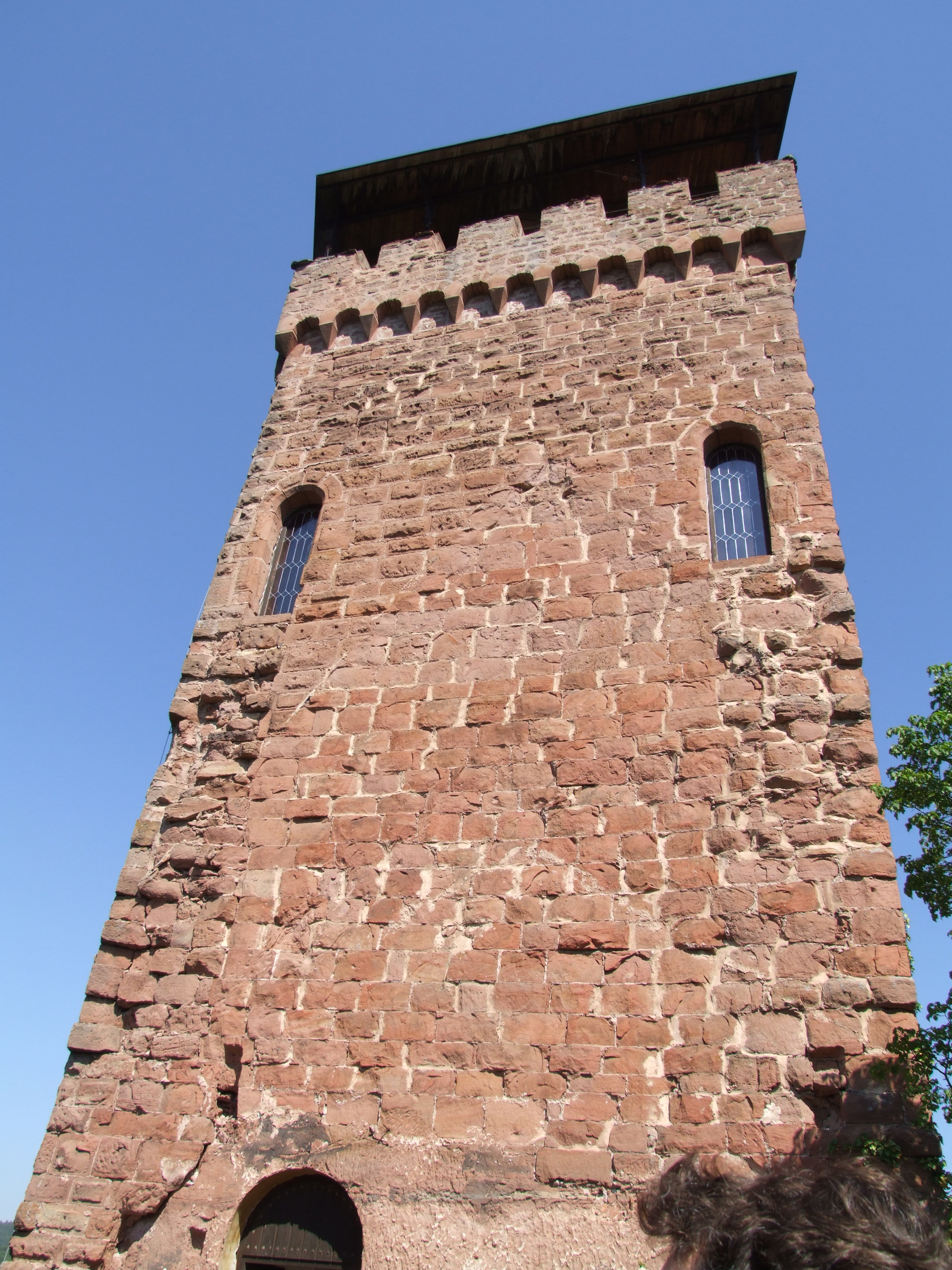
The bergfried

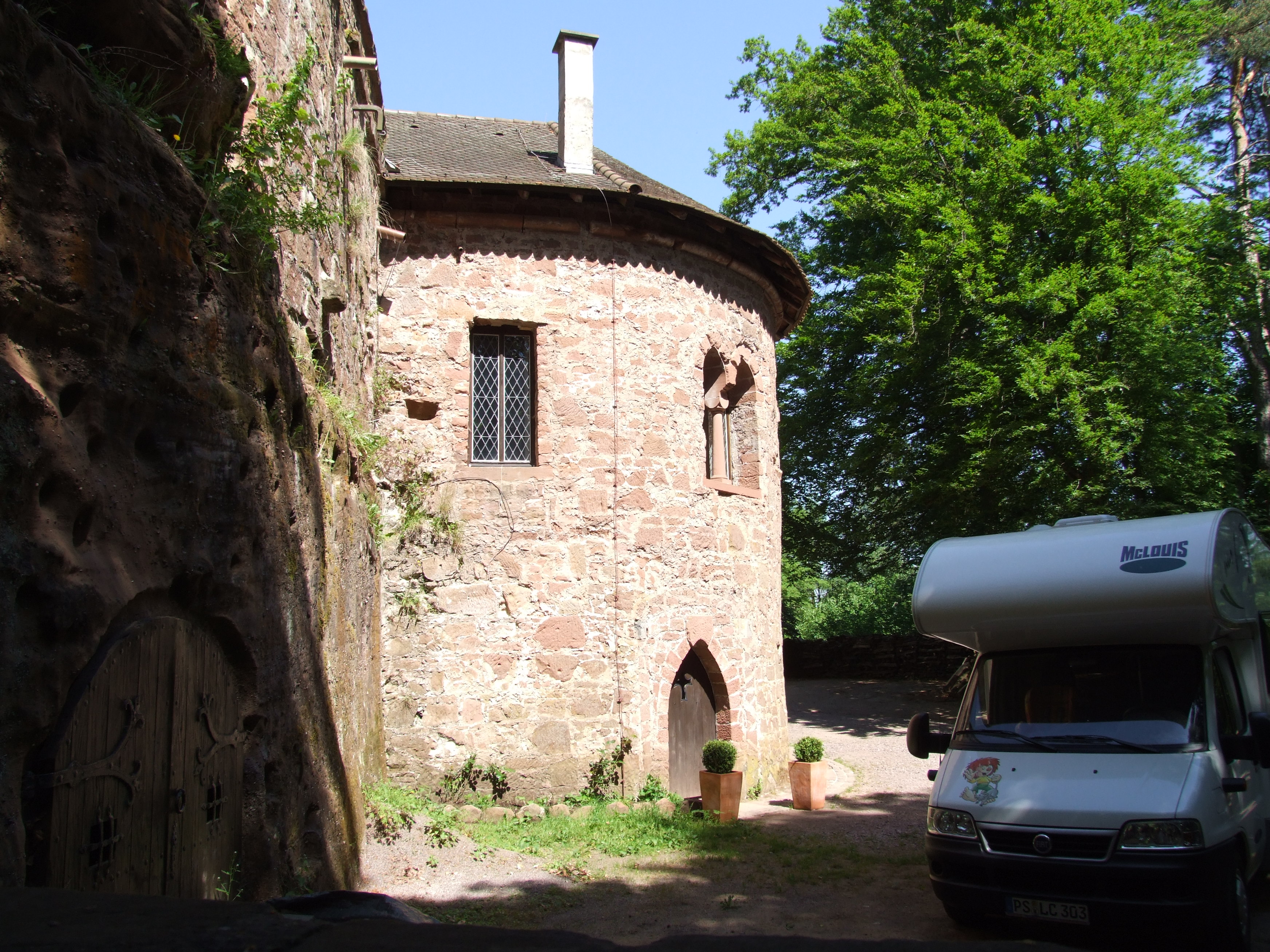
One of the lower towers

=== Rock structures and underground passages ===
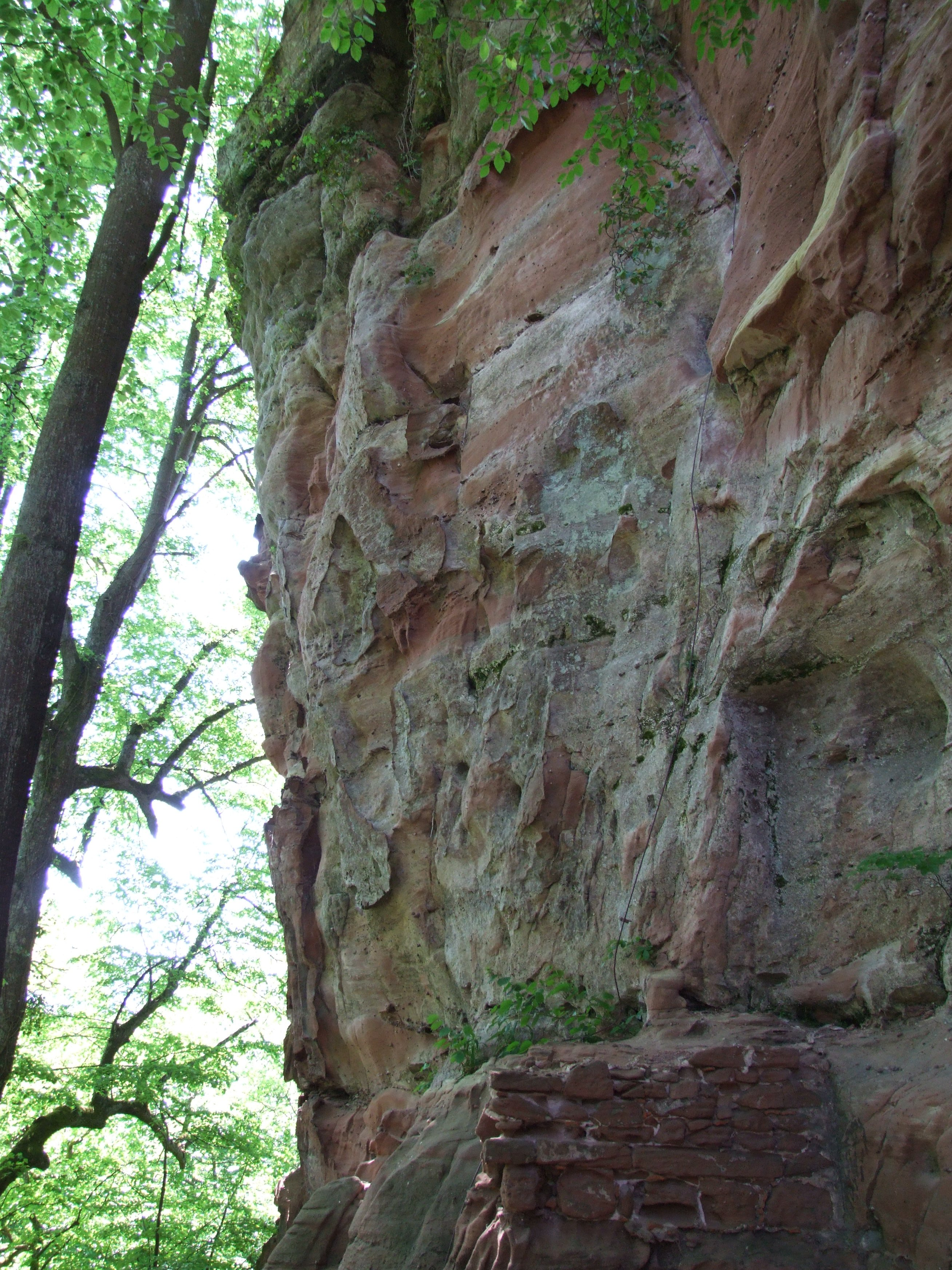
View of the sandstone wall

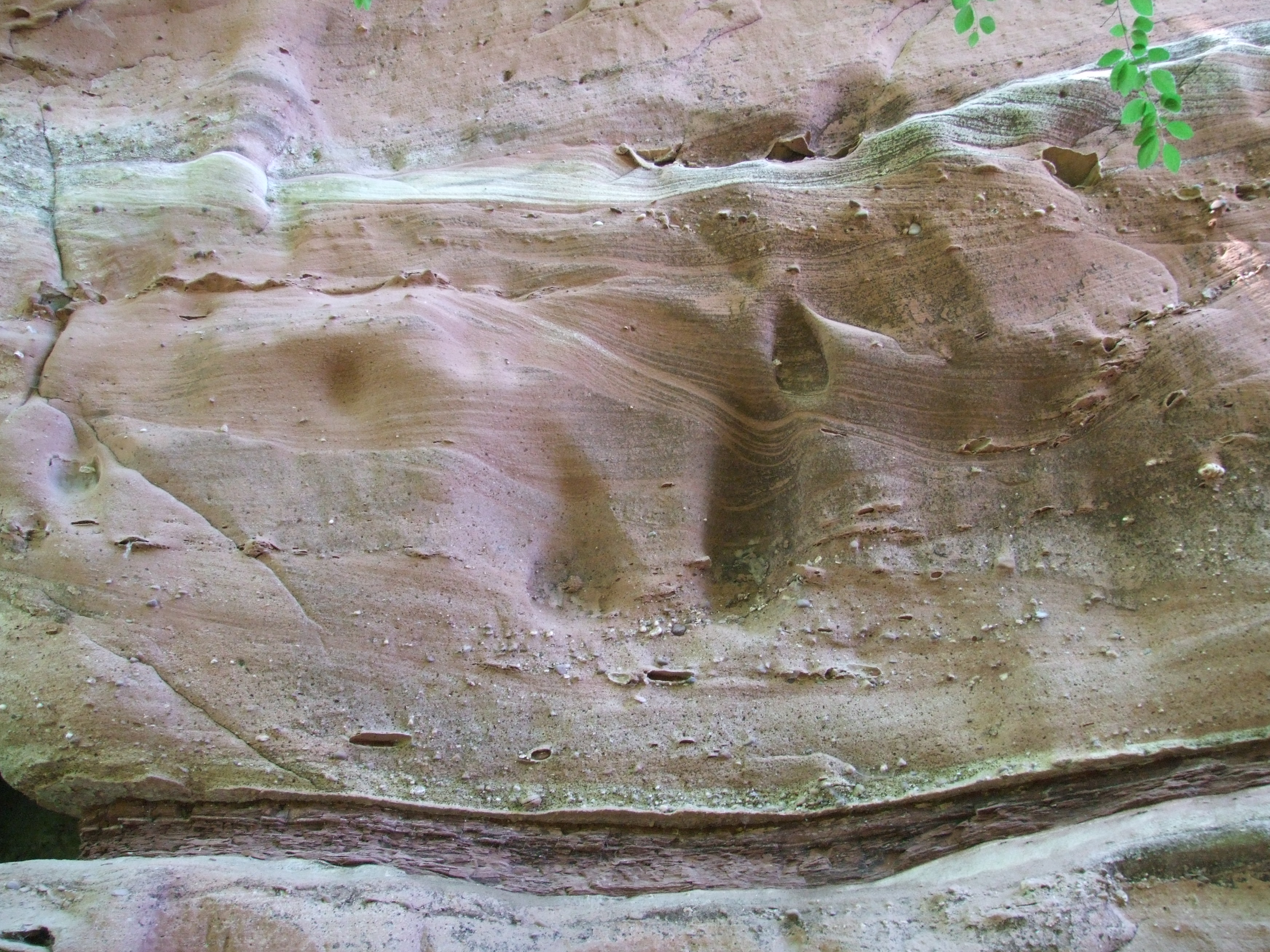
Detailed view of the rock face

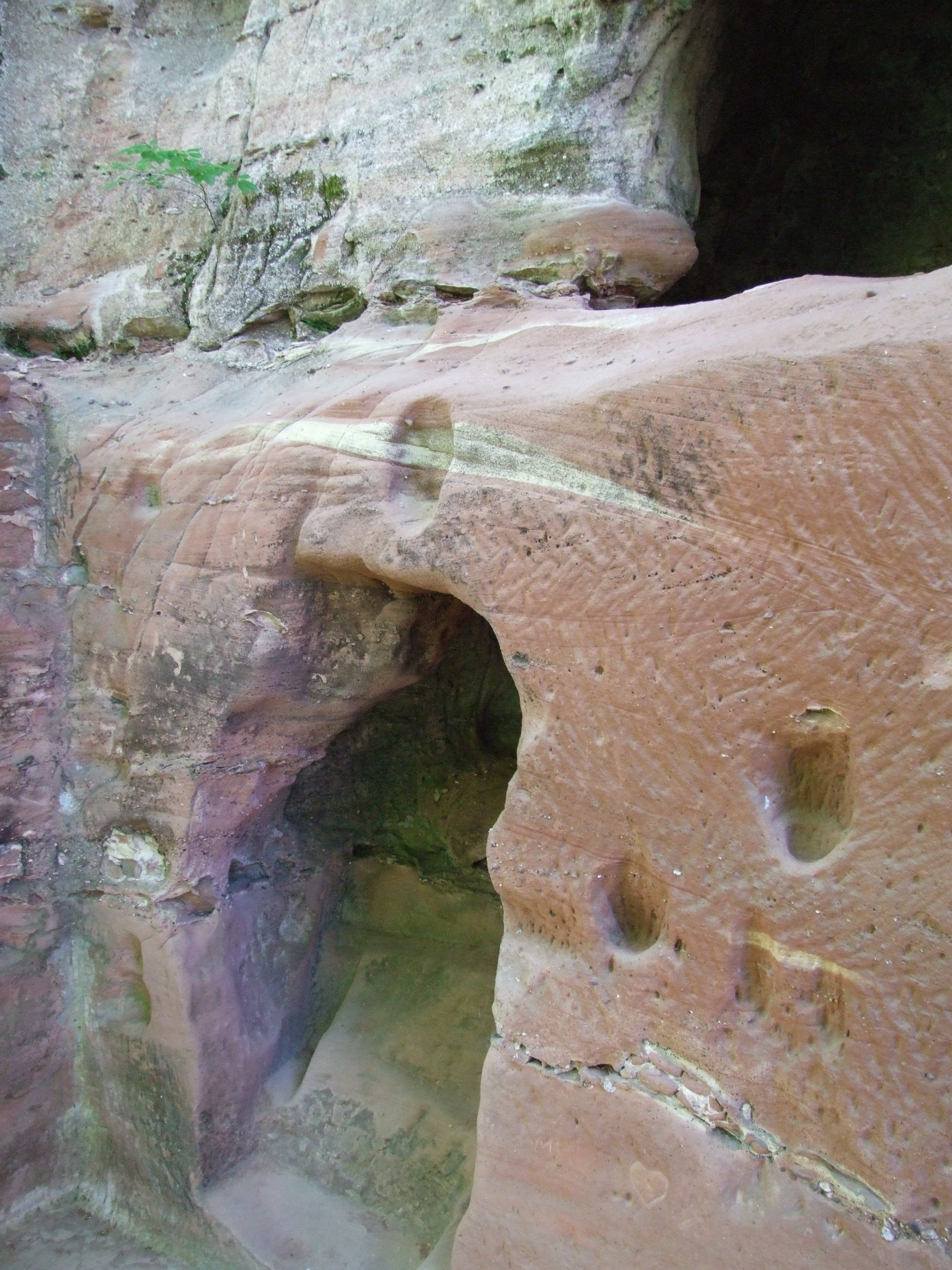
An ascent in the rock face

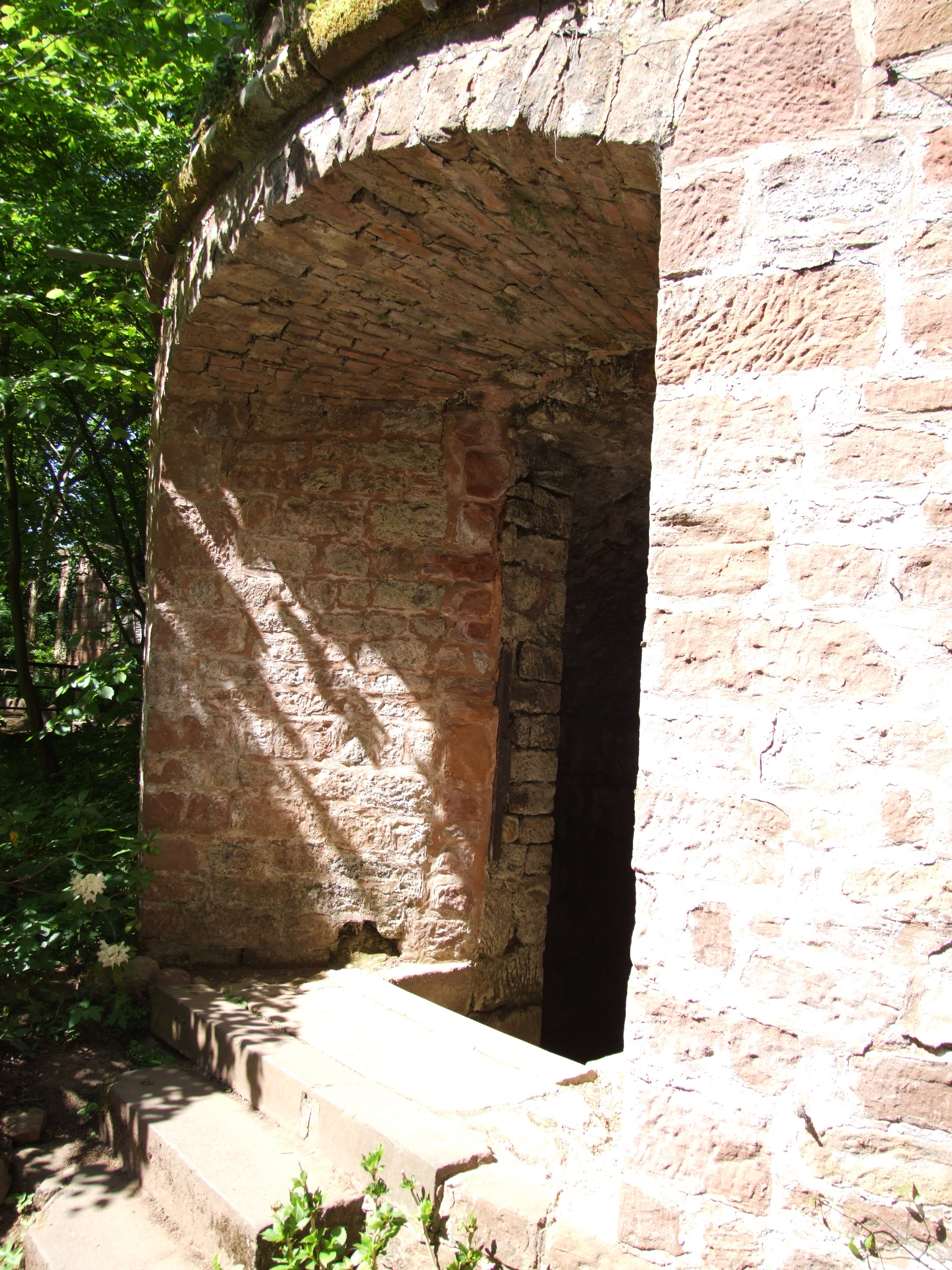
Entrance

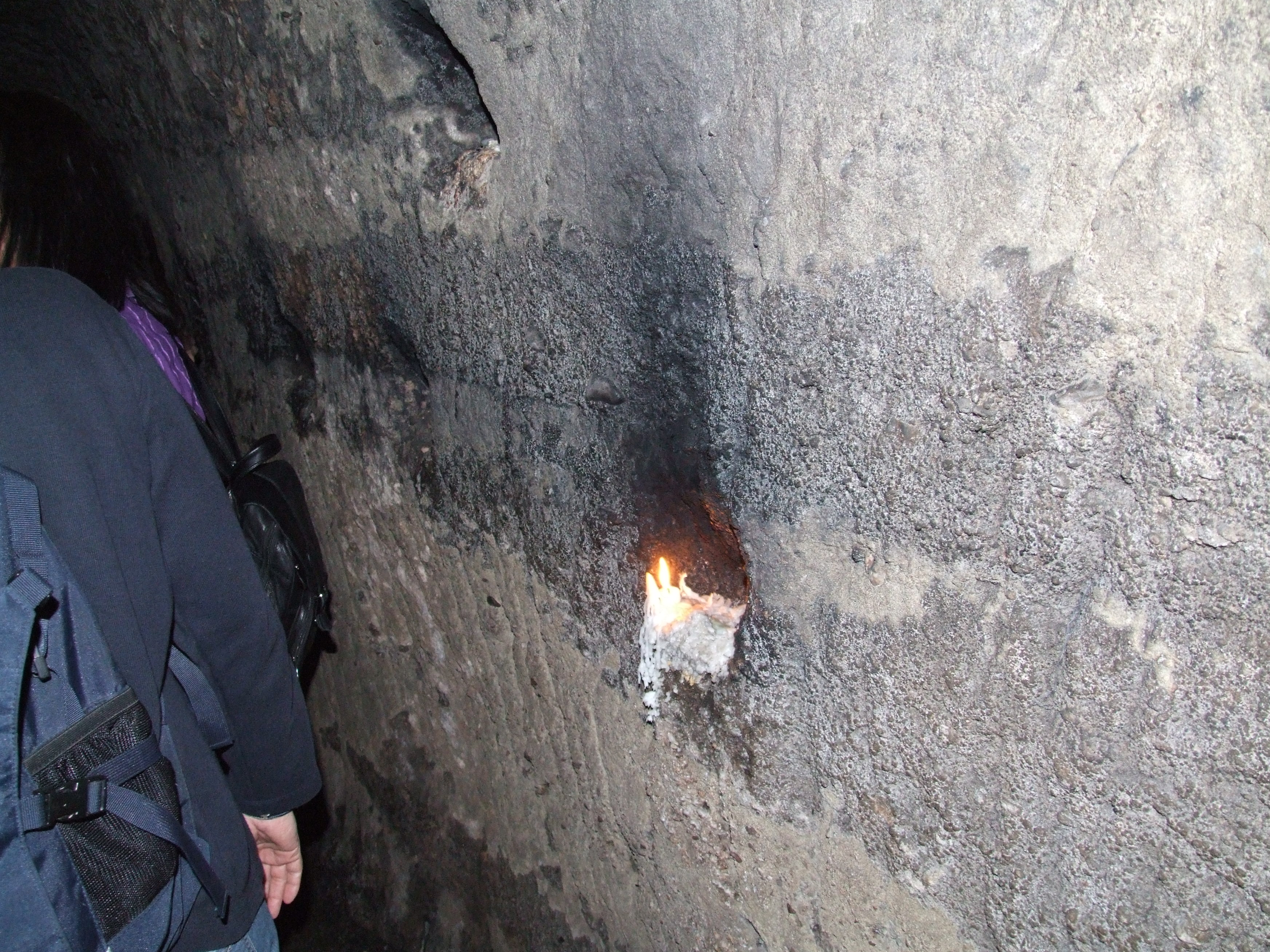
Candle niche in a rock passage

=== Interiors and furnishings ===
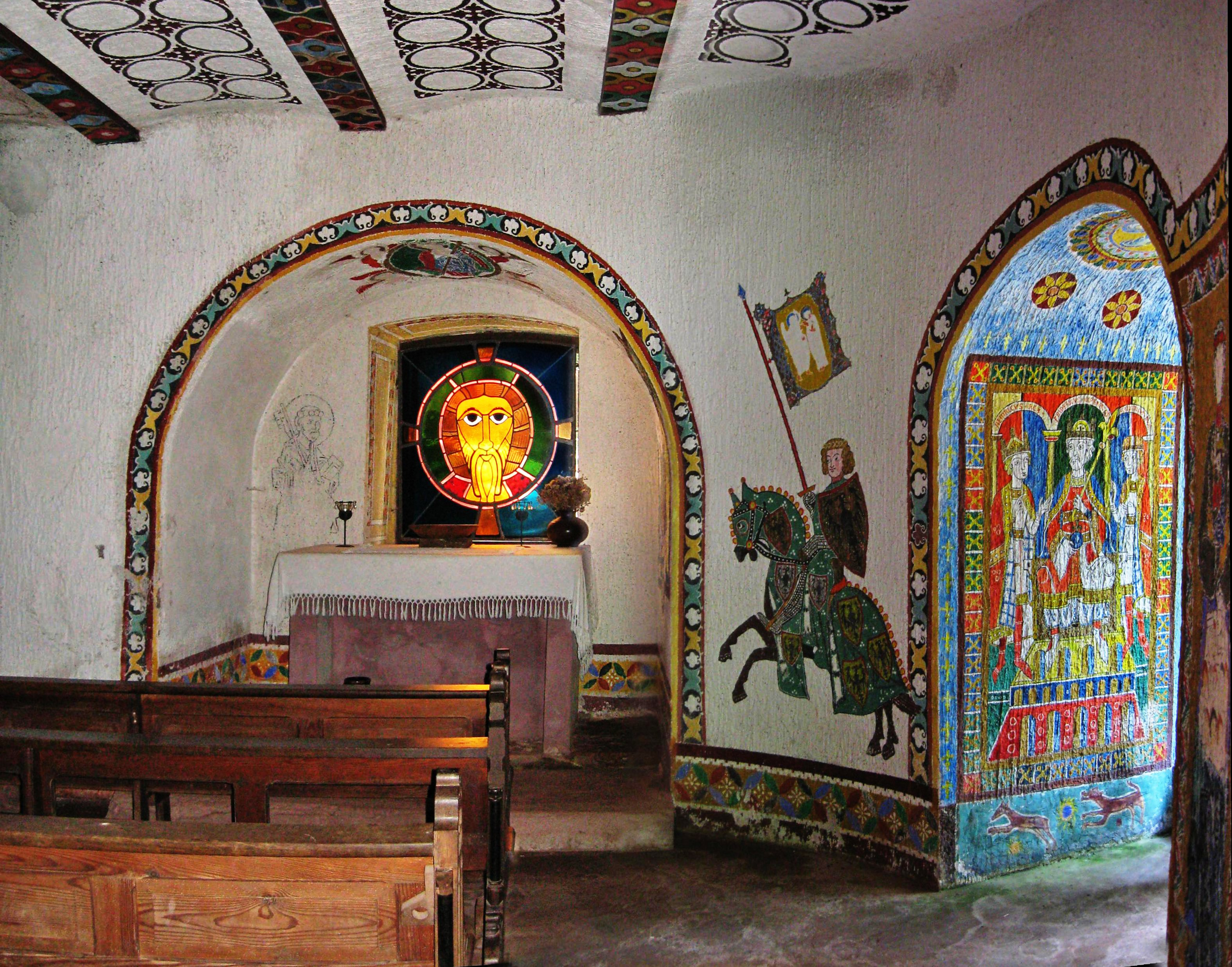
The chapel

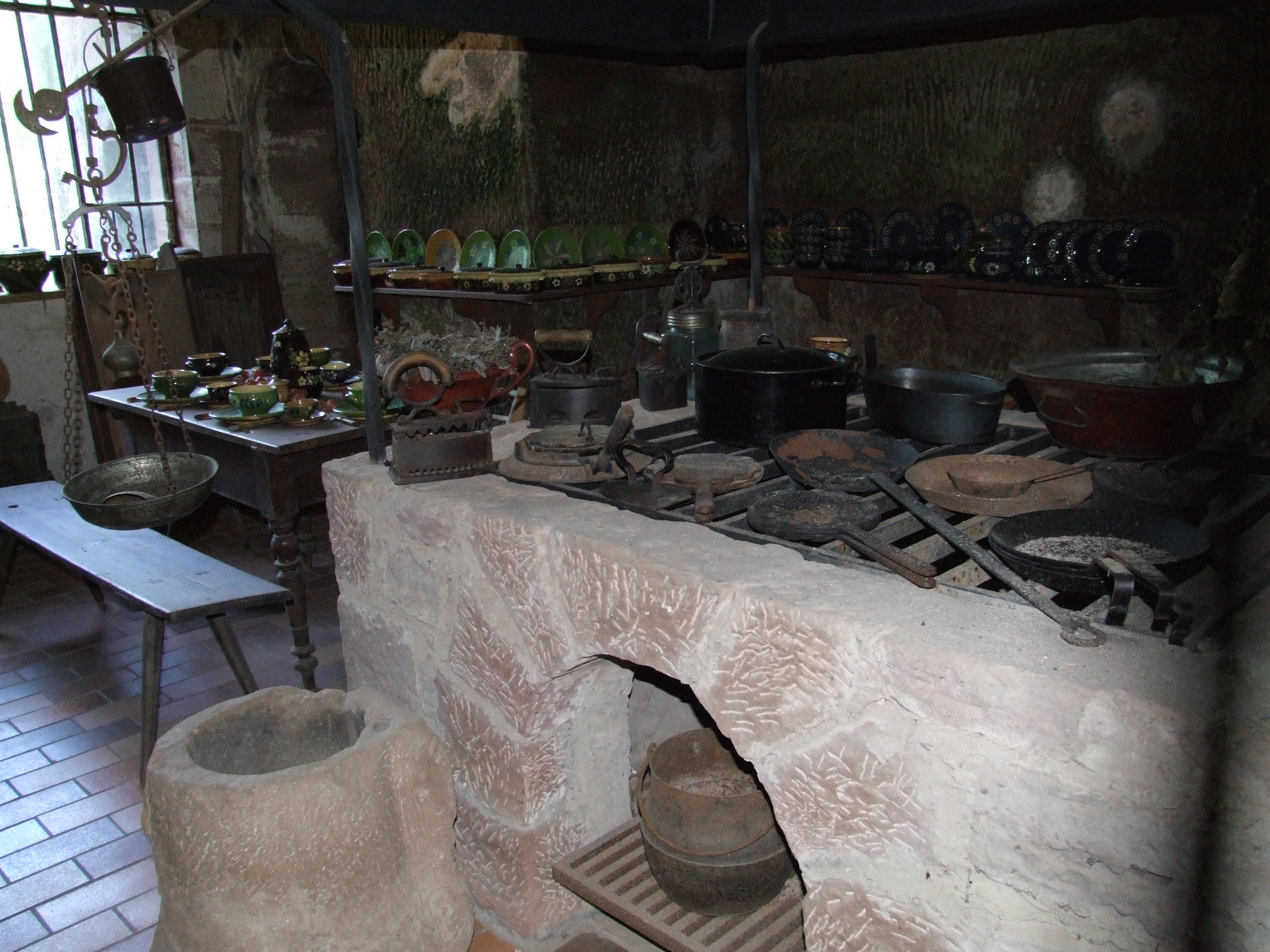
The castle kitchen stove

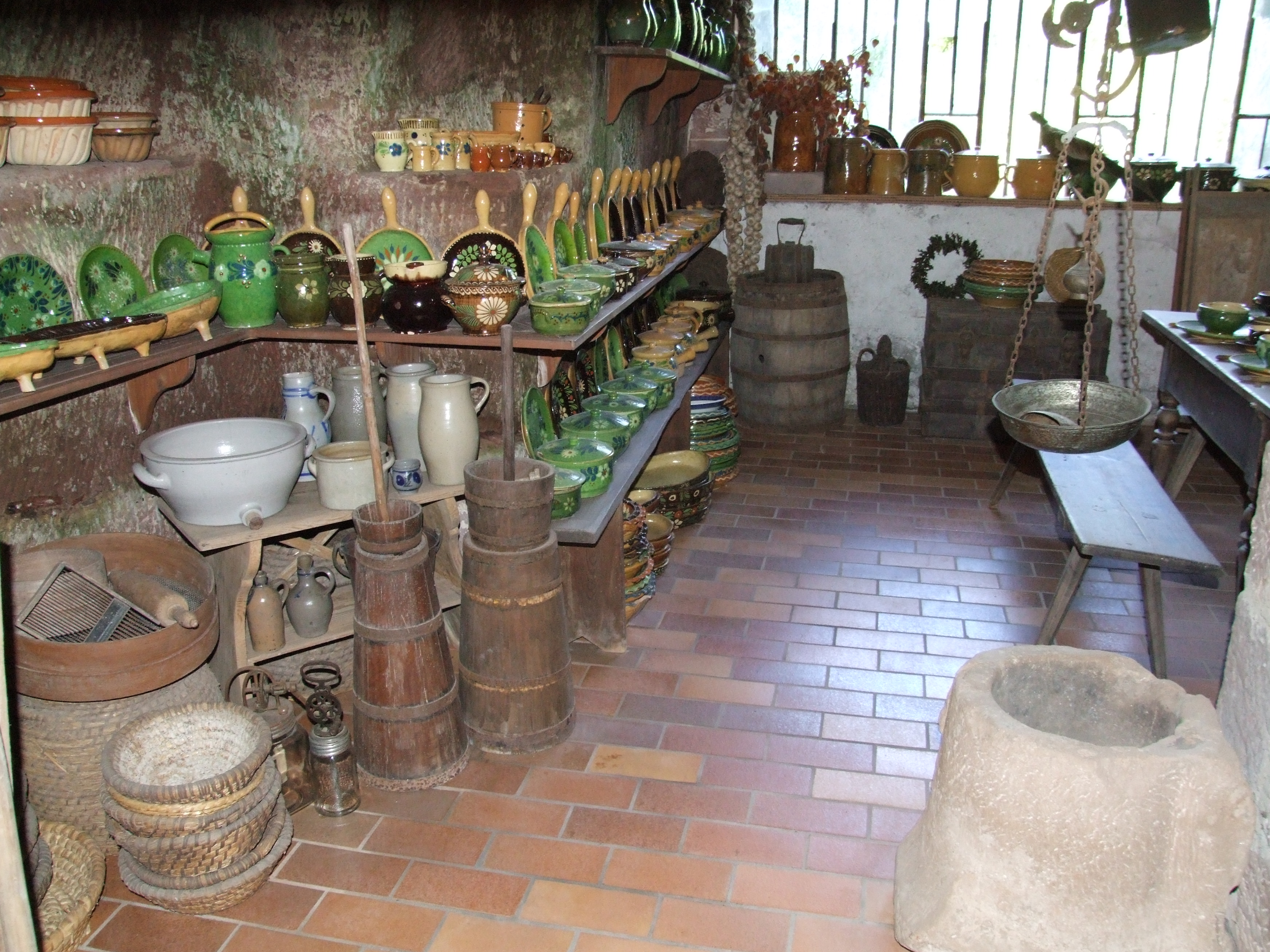
View of castle kitchen

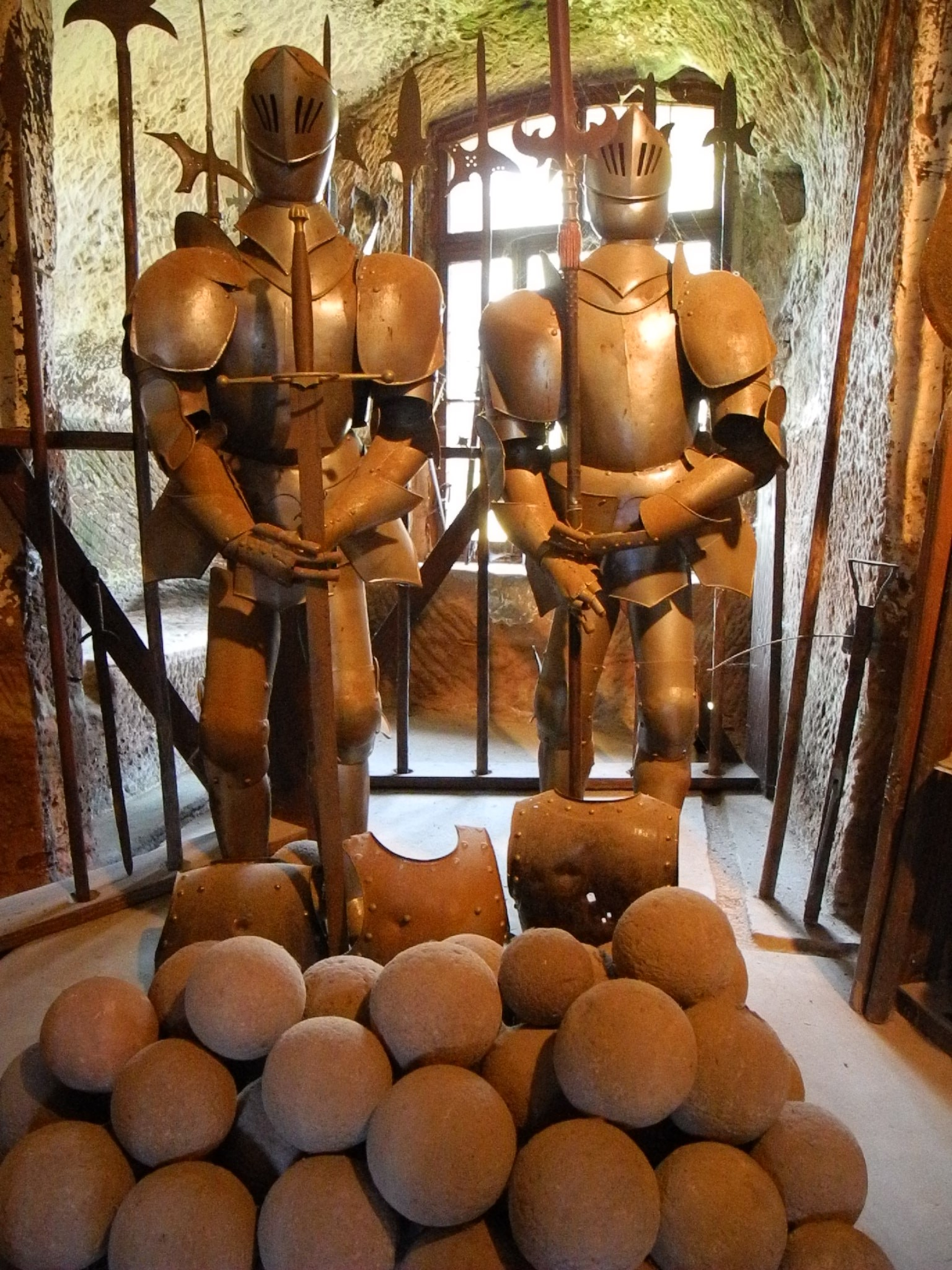
Armour and cannonballs

=== View ===
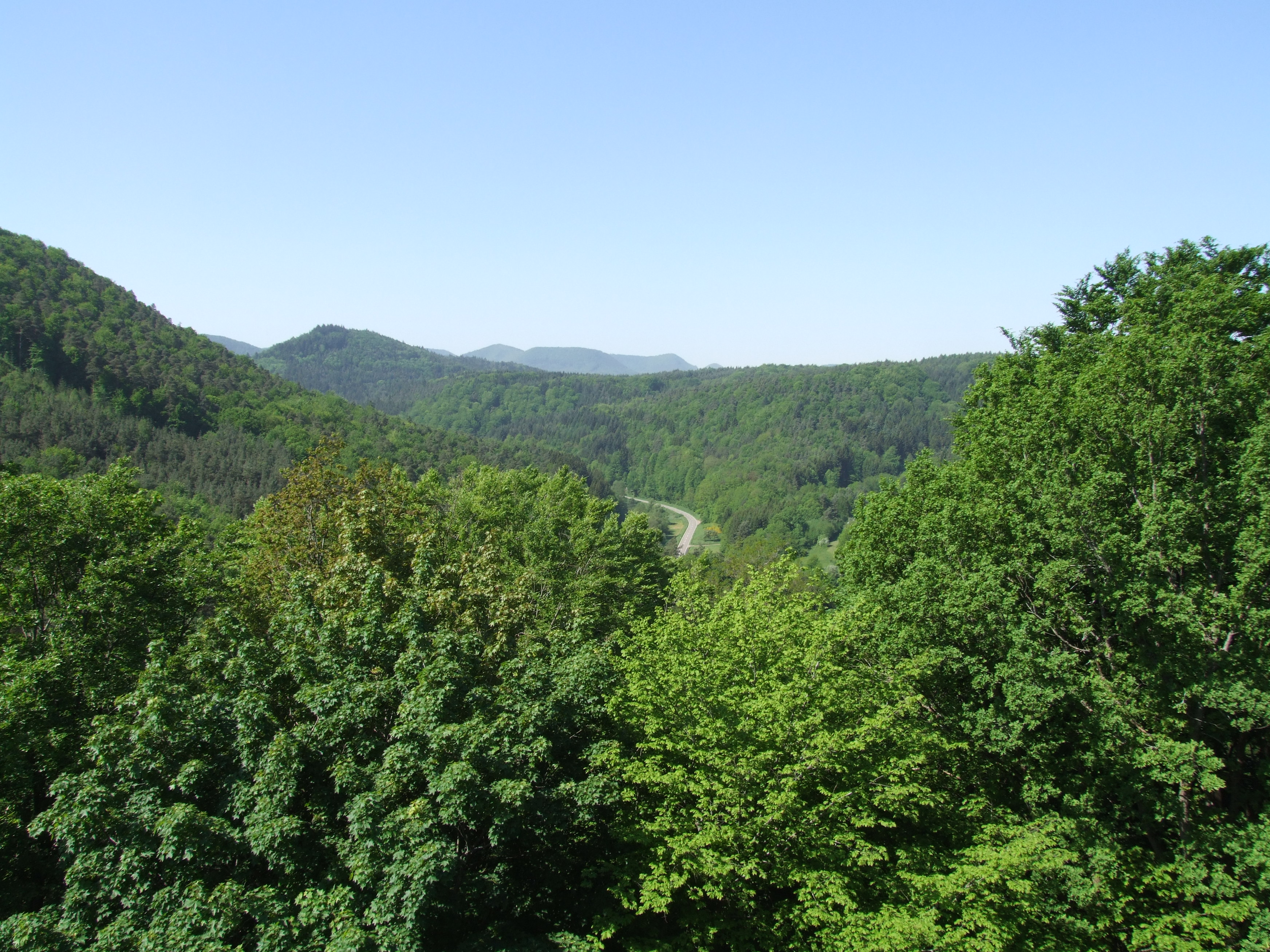
View looking west

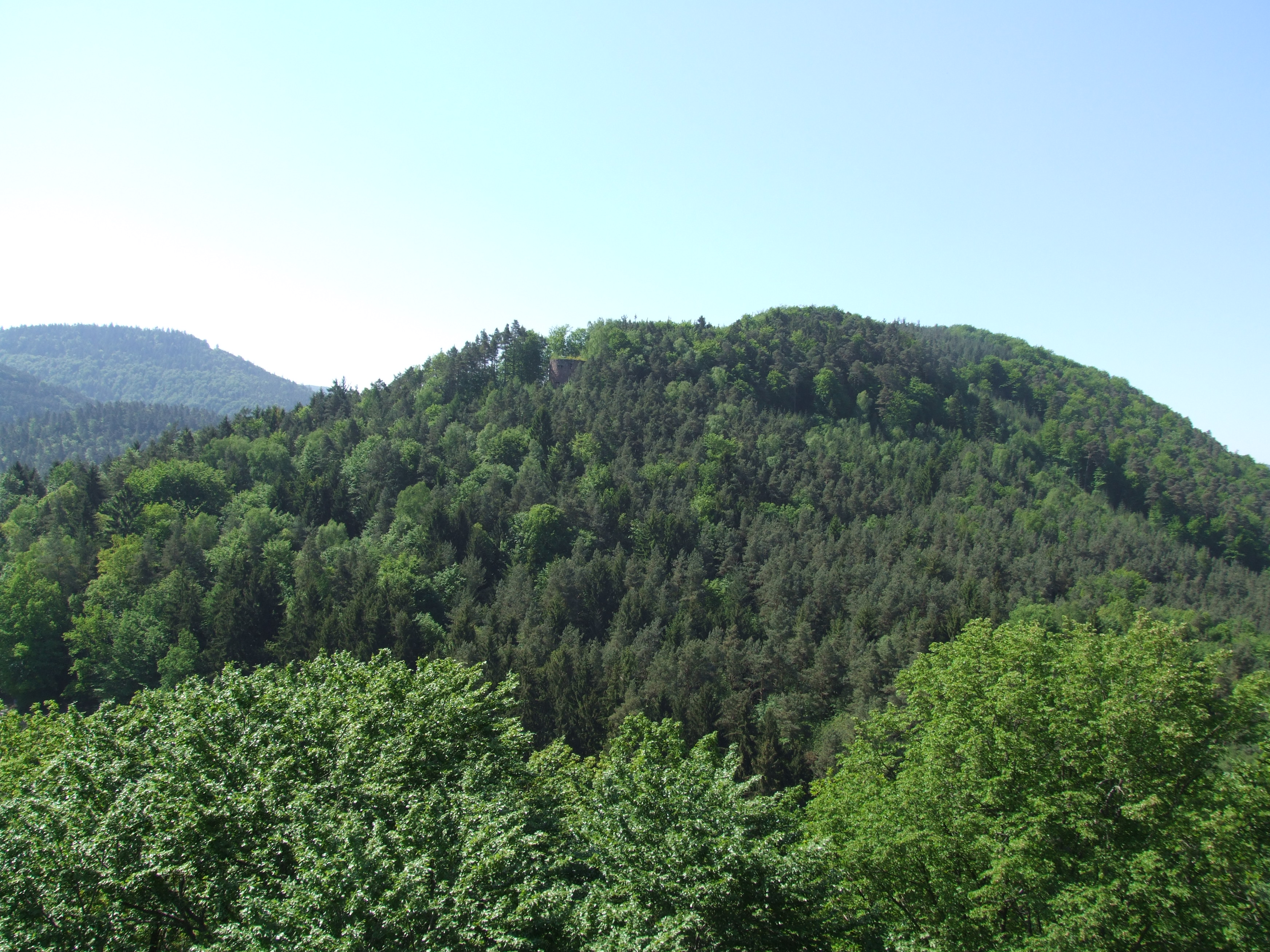
View looking south to Little France

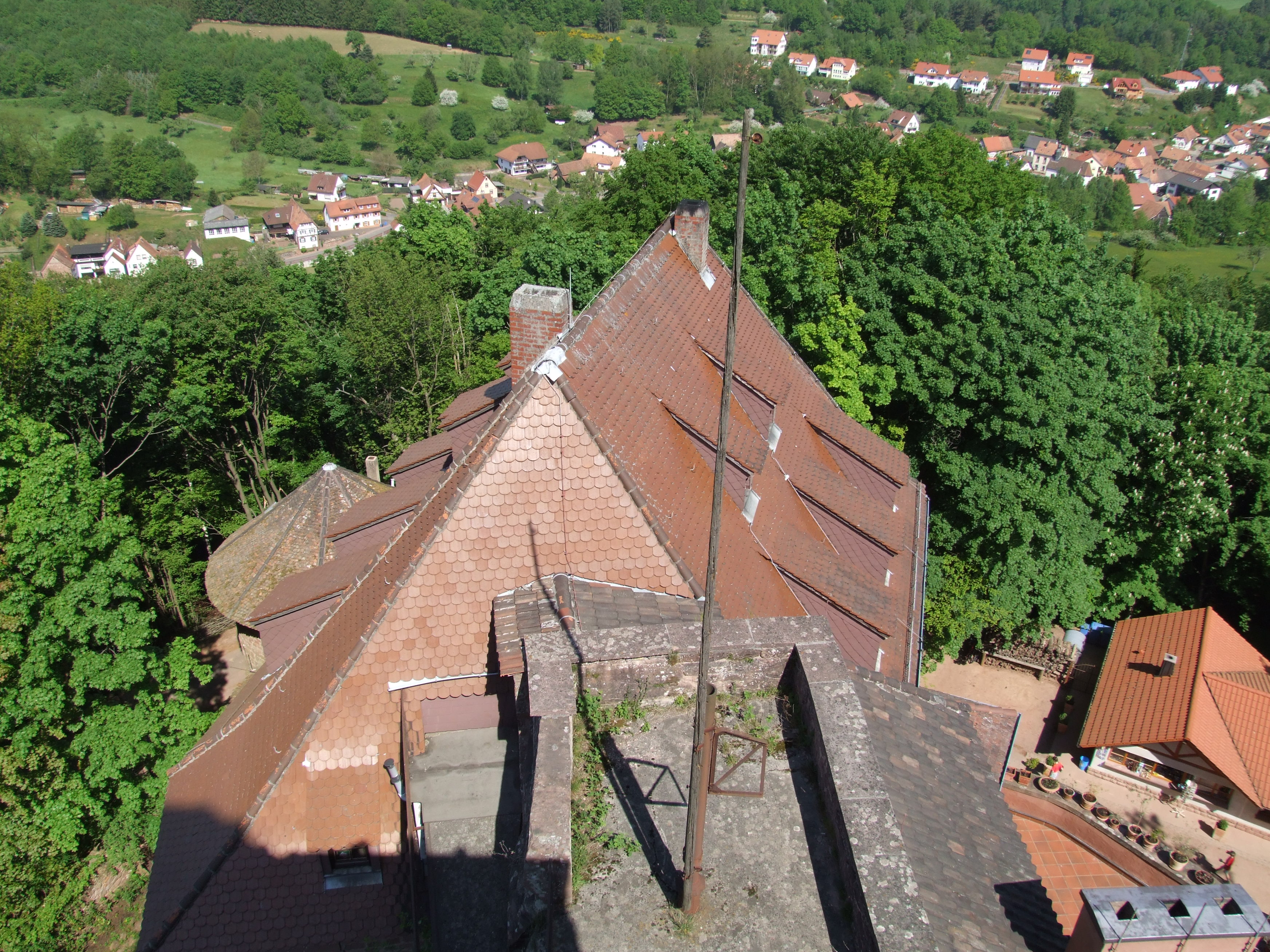
Looking north from the bergfried

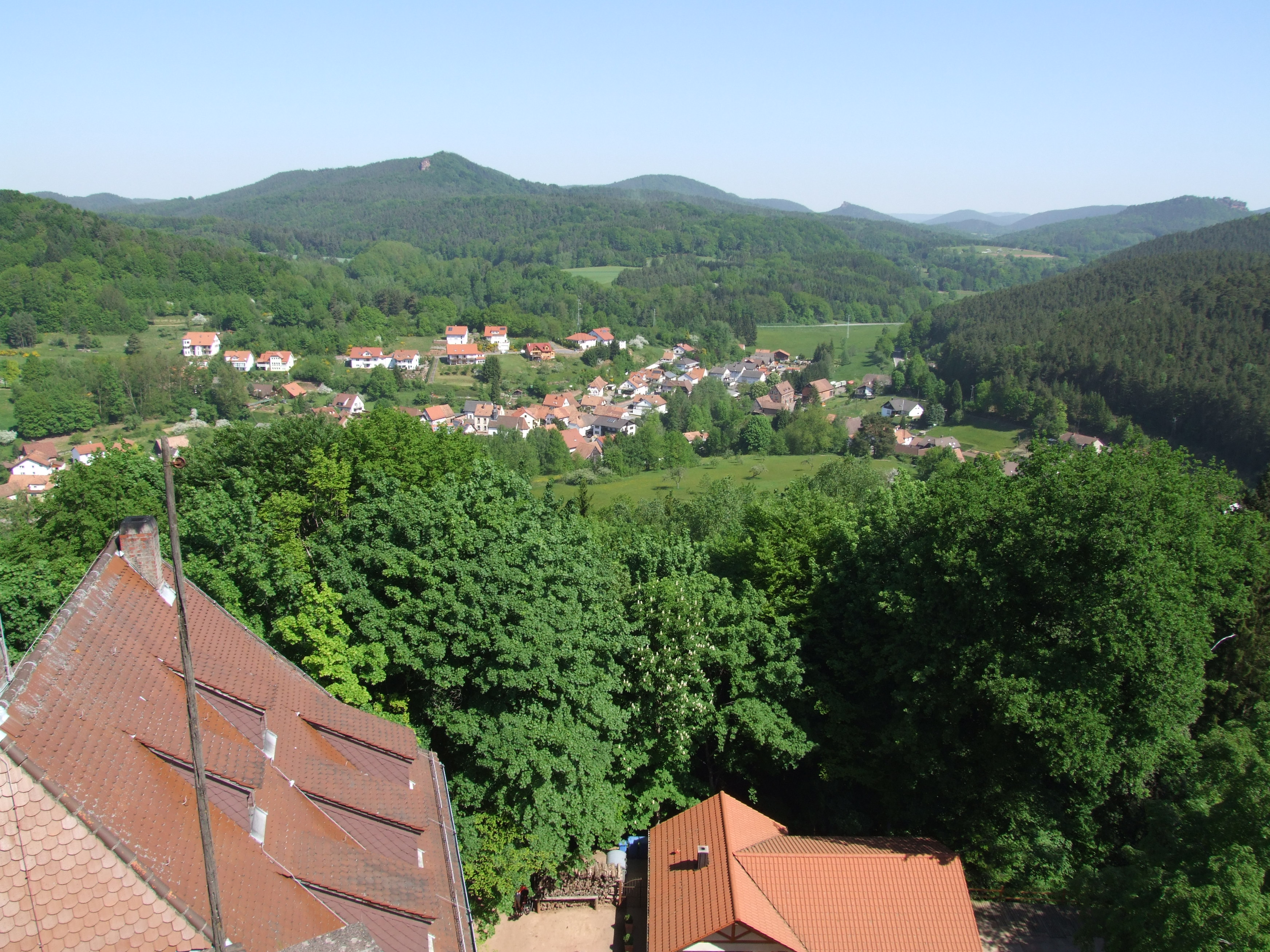
View looking northeast
