= Crossfire =

Deliberately overlapping arcs of fire

Depiction of crossfire

A crossfire (also known as interlocking fire) is a military term for the siting of weapons (often automatic weapons such as assault rifles or submachine guns) so that their arcs of fire overlap. This tactic came to prominence in World War I.

Siting weapons this way is an example of the application of the defensive principle of mutual support. The advantage of siting weapons that mutually support one another is that it is difficult for an attacker to find a covered approach to any one defensive position. Use of armour, air support, indirect fire support, and stealth are tactics that may be used to assault a defensive position.

== Early modern warfare ==
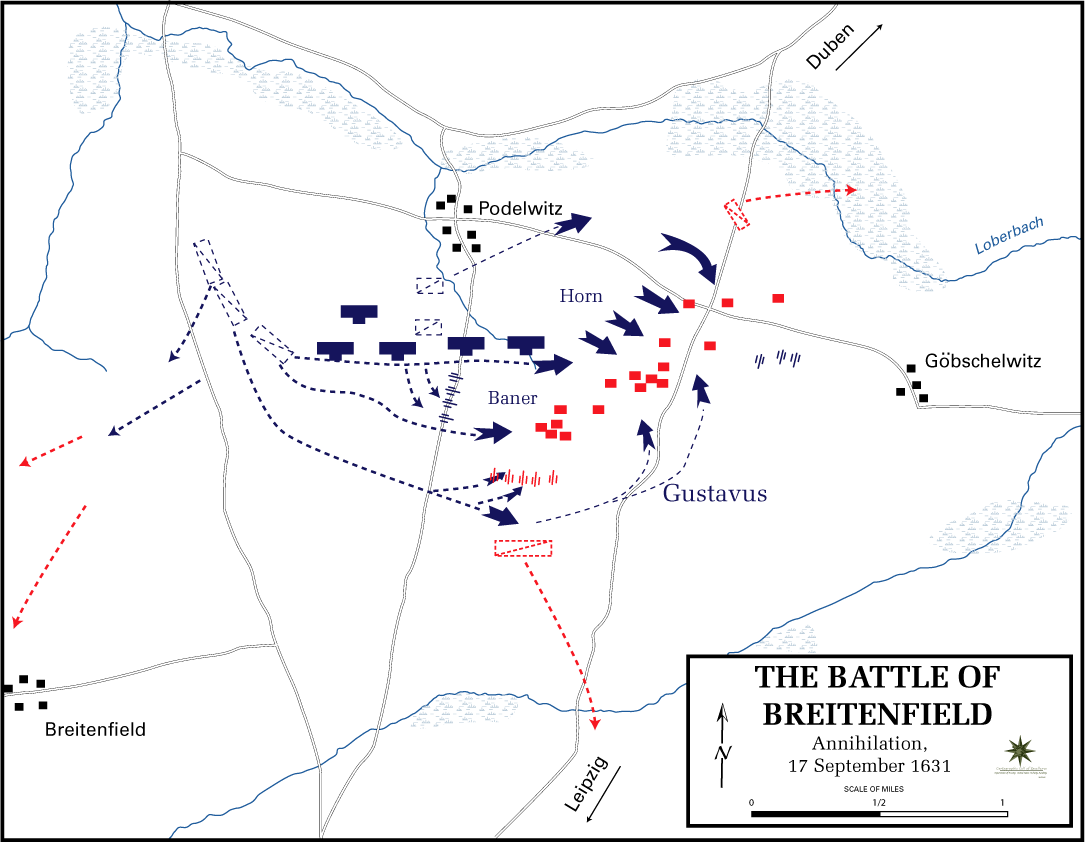
Swedish cavalry at Breitenfeld capture the Imperial artillery, turning them to crossfire bombardment of the main Imperial army.

The concept of overlapping arcs of fire drove major developments in the use of cannon in early modern Europe. The star fort forced attackers approaching the walls into the overlapping enfilade of the protruding bastions; attempts to achieve a similar effect through maneuver on the battlefield were limited by the weight and size of the artillery of the time. The earliest experiments in mobile artillery, such as the leather cannon, were generally flawed due to the limitations of the materials science of the period, but eventually gave rise to the regimental gun.

Perhaps the most famous example of crossfire tactics in early modern warfare occurred in the final stages of the First Battle of Breitenfeld. Swedish cavalry under Gustavus Adolphus outflanked and seized the artillery pieces of the Imperial army. As the battle had progressed, the Imperial guns were now well-positioned to fire upon the bulk of the Imperial army, and the crossfire of Swedish and captured cannon shattered the Imperial forces.

== Trench warfare ==
The tactic of using overlapping arcs of fire came to prominence during World War I where it was a feature of trench warfare. Machine guns were placed in groups, called machine-gun nests, and they protected the front of the trenches. Many people died in futile attempts to charge across the no man's land where these crossfires were set up.

== "Caught in the crossfire" ==
To be "caught in the crossfire" is an expression that often refers to unintended casualties (bystanders, etc.) who were killed or wounded by being exposed to the gunfire of a battle or gun fight, such as in a position to be hit by bullets of either side. The phrase has come to mean any injury, damage or harm (physical or otherwise) caused to a third party due to the action of belligerents (collateral damage).
