= Waldmohr =

- Municipality
- Location of Waldmohr within Kusel district
- Interactive map of Waldmohr
- Location within Germany Location within Rhineland-Palatinate
- Coordinates: 49°23′43″N 7°20′28″E
- Country: Germany
- State: Rhineland-Palatinate
- District: Kusel
- Municipal assoc.: Oberes Glantal
- Subdivisions: 3

Government
  - Mayor (2019–24): Jürgen Schneider (SPD)

Area
  - Total: 13.03 km^{2} (5.03 sq mi)
- Elevation: 269 m (883 ft)

Population (2025-12-31)
  - Total: 5,118
  - Density: 392.8/km^{2} (1,017/sq mi)
- Time zone: UTC+01:00 (CET)
  - Summer (DST): UTC+02:00 (CEST)
- Postal codes: 66914
- Dialling codes: 06373
- Vehicle registration: KUS
- Website: www.waldmohr.org

Waldmohr (German pronunciation: [ˈvaltˌmoːɐ̯]) is a town in the Kusel district in Rhineland-Palatinate, Germany. It belongs to the Verbandsgemeinde Oberes Glantal.

== Geography ==
=== Location ===
The municipality lies at the western end of the Landstuhl Marsh (a depression), right at the state boundary with the Saarland roughly 15 km southwest of Kusel, and 10 km north of Homburg. Spreading out along a length of the Glan into the hills on each side, Waldmohr's municipal area reaches elevations of 362 m above sea level at the Waldziegelhütte (an outlying centre whose name means “forest brickworks”) and 234 m above sea level at the Eichelscheid (another outlying centre). The chain of hills, Steines, Fuchsberg, Bolsten, Schachen and Heidenkopf with Oehlbühl, which slope down to the south towards the Glan, and the mountain ridges, Häupel, Mühlfeld, Härtel, and Krämmel, which even out gently towards the north and east, are heavily settled along the greater thoroughfares leading to the heart of the village. Landesstraße 355 bypasses the village to the east and links it to the Autobahn. The river Glan, which rises in neighbouring Höchen, receives considerable contributions at Waldmohr's municipal limit, where the Branschbach and the Mörschbach empty into it at the edge of the Dörrberg. Several big ponds (Dörrbergweiher and Mohrmühlweiher) and many fishing ponds enrich the landscape's appearance. The old tank trench at the Eichelscheiderhof has long been a renaturated stretch of the Glan

=== Neighbouring municipalities ===
Waldmohr borders in the north on the municipality of Schönenberg-Kübelberg, in the east on the municipality of Bruchmühlbach-Miesau, in the south on the town of Homburg (not to be confused with the municipality of Homberg), in the west on the town of Bexbach and in the northwest on the municipality of Dunzweiler.

=== Constituent communities ===
Waldmohr's Ortsteile are Waldmohr (main centre), Eichelscheiderhof (10) and Waldziegelhütte (112). Also belonging to Waldmohr are the outlying homesteads of Bahnhaus (5), Bolsterhof (14), Erlenhof (6), Mohrmühle (24), Oehlbühlerhof (2), Waldhaus (3) and Autobahnrasthaus (0). Figures in parentheses are population figures as of 2000.

==== Eichelscheiderhof ====
Originally a noble estate belonging to the Duchy of Palatine Zweibrücken, the Eichelscheiderhof once stood within Jägersburg's municipal limits. With the formation of the Saar zone of occupation under a League of Nations mandate in 1920, the estate was split from Jägersburg and added to Waldmohr. The name first crops up in Tielemann Stella's writings from 1587 as Eichenschitt, and refers to the wealth of oaktrees in the area (Eiche means “oak” in German). The Eichelscheider Hof itself had its first documentary mention at the time of its founding in 1704. While the Jägersburg Hunting Palace (Jagdschloss Jägersburg) was being built near the district seat of Homburg, the estate was converted into a lordly stud farm, serving the famous Zweibrücken breeding until the end of the Second World War. Napoleon’s parade horse came from the Eichelscheider Hof. The stables are laid out horseshoe-shaped with a great inner yard, and parts have been converted to dwellings. The gateway dominates the estate's appearance. To the right of the stables stands the former manor house. The village of Jägersburg belonged wholly to Waldmohr. Only when the Saar was occupied in 1918 was Jägersburg taken away from Waldmohr. Jägersburg thereby became a self-administering municipality, although it has since been merged into Homburg.

=== Municipality’s layout ===
The very old linking roads to neighbouring villages are mostly still preserved and usable. The economically important forest paths used for logging and hiking are maintained and in good condition, whereas others are being reclaimed by the wilderness and are disappearing. Farm lanes, too, are only passable if the fields that they reach are still being used. During the Flurbereinigung undertaken in the late 1950s, which saw various parcels of land consolidated, many fieldpaths were swept away. As of 1990, the municipality of Waldmohr had all together 563.9 ha of wooded land, of which 365 ha was state-owned, 159.3 ha was municipally owned and 39.6 ha was privately owned. As of 1983, Waldmohr had an area of 1 307 ha, of which 363 ha, or 27.2%, was under agricultural use. According to the municipal plan, 18.5 ha is given over to existing bodies of water. Various rural cadastral names point to historical ownership, location, particular soil conditions or former bodies of water. A few examples include: Kirchelborn or Kirckelborn, Spickelberg, Warbach, Bolsten, Häupel, Heiligenwald, etc. In 1901, the forestry office building came into service. The region over which it holds sway is today one of the biggest in the Palatinate. In 1257, the Mohrmühle, one of the oldest mills in the region, had its first documentary mention. The old mill, where from sometime before 1610 until 1645 in the Thirty Years' War direct ancestors of former President of Germany Richard von Weizsäcker lived, is now a destination for outings with a restaurant. In the 1960s, another old mill, the Waldmohrer Mühle, built in 1715, was falling into ever greater disrepair and ended up being torn down. Only a couple of rural cadastral names (in den Mühlwiesen, auf dem Mühlfeld) now recall the actual mill. It was both a gristmill and a sawmill in its time. Three outlying farmsteads (Aussiedlerhöfe) are still worked nowadays. These are Oehlbühlerhof (founded in 1958; area 0.9 ha), Bolsterhof (founded in 1958; area 0.9 ha) and Erlenhof (founded in 1965; area 0.8 ha). The Oehlbühlerhof is tended by the owner of the Erlenhof.

== History ==
In 830, Waldmohr had its first documentary mention in the Lorsch codex as villa Moraha – “village on the boggy brook”. In 1449, the village passed into the lordship of the Dukes of Palatine Zweibrücken and remained under their rule until the duchy itself was swept away by the events of the French Revolution in 1794. Under French rule, Waldmohr became the seat of the like-named canton in the Department of Sarre, thus beginning the village's history as an administrative seat. After the French occupation ended, the Palatinate passed to the Kingdom of Bavaria, with Waldmohr retaining its function as the cantonal seat for 57 villages between Kirkel and Glan-Münchweiler. It lost its place as such only after the separation of the Saar after the First World War. In 1920, Waldmohr was assigned to the Bezirksamt of Kusel and downgraded to a Bezirksamt branch location. In 1946, it was grouped into the then newly founded state of Rhineland-Palatinate, and in 1971, when it became the seat of the Verbandsgemeinde of Waldmohr, it regained some of its lost glory.

=== Antiquity ===
The barrows that go back to middle Late Hallstatt times (about 550 BC) on both sides of the Rhineland-Palatinate-Saarland boundary in the Kuhwald (“Cow Forest”) visibly bear witness even today to early settlement, and after archaeological digs at two of them in 1995 and 1996 they became an attraction for those interested in history. The old highway is still today recognizable along almost its whole length, and much broader than an ordinary country path. In various descriptions from the 14th to the 16th century, it is called the Mohrerweg or Landstraße von Mor nach Erbach (“Highway from Mor to Erbach”), with Mor or Mohr in each case referring to Waldmohr (the prefix Wald— simply means “forest”). Long-settled villagers still speak today of the old Homburger Weg (Erbach lies near Homburg, and is today a constituent community of that town), while in Erbach, it is seen as the Waldmohrer Weg. This east-west road link is of Roman origin, if not even older. After the Romans withdrew in the early 5th century, the region was almost empty of people, and only once the Franks had come to take the land was it slowly settled once more. In this time, the Bliesgau was grouped administratively into Francia.

=== Middle Ages ===
The placename Moraha was used for centuries more, even after the name Waltmore had had its first documentary mention in 1418. From 1190 to 1441, a knightly family named “von Moran” was mentioned as being among the vassals of the Counts of Homburg. Several times, the counts pledged the village and court of More, or at least parts thereof, for example, between 1383 and 1410 to the Counts of Veldenz, and once again to the same noble house between 1449 and 1475. In 1312, forty farmers were living in Waldmohr. From 1475 to 1815, the Schultheißerei of Waldmohr belonged to the Duchy of Palatine Zweibrücken. As early as 1404, Waldmohr was mentioned as being the seat of a lower court.

=== Modern times ===
In 1535, the Reformation was introduced, after a parish had existed since at least 1219 according to records. The existence of a school in Waldmohr is mentioned for the first time in a 1564 Visitation report. In 1605 came the first mention of an actual schoolhouse. In 1609, the village had 225 Reformed inhabitants at 42 “hearth places” (for which, read “households”). Waldmohr did not fare well in the Thirty Years' War, when troops burnt it down in 1622 and destroyed it utterly in 1635. In 1688 and 1689, the village was once again beset and burnt down in the Nine Years' War (known in Germany as the Pfälzischer Erbfolgekrieg, or War of the Palatine Succession). From 1679 to 1697, Waldmohr – along with the whole region – found itself under French rule. In 1701, a new schoolhouse was built. In 1704, the Eichelscheiderhof had its first documentary mention, as did the Waldziegelhütte in 1749. Between 1752 and 1757, Duke Christian IV had the Eichelscheiderhof stud farm built on the site of the estate of that name. It was built in the shape of a small palatial residence with its gateway into the horseshoe-shaped complex.

In 1765, near the old village church auf der Fels (“On the Cliff”), the new Evangelical church was consecrated. In 1775, a directory of Reformed parishioners (for Waldmohr only), not counting shepherds, menservants or maidservants, listed 54 men, 71 women, 91 boys and 89 girls. The parish belonged until the establishment of the Oberamt of Homburg in 1781 to the Inspection of Zweibrücken, to which the village also belonged administratively.

From 1798 to 1815, Waldmohr was seat of the like-named canton in the Department of Sarre, and seat, too, of a mairie (“mayoralty”), belonging to which were Waldmohr, Jägersburg, Kleinottweiler, Höchen, Frohnhofen, Breitenbach, Altenkirchen and Dittweiler. Besides Waldmohr, the canton also included Kübelberg, Schönenberg, Sand, Miesau, Elschbach, Scheidenberg (Schanzer Mühle), Ohmbach and Brücken. The canton belonged to the Arrondissement of Saarbrücken. An 1812 record mentions a cantonal prison in Waldmohr. In 1813, Waldmohr had 683 inhabitants.

==== Recent times ====
Beginning in 1816, after Napoleon’s downfall and the Congress of Vienna, Waldmohr belonged to the Kingdom of Bavaria, within which it was once again seat of the like-named canton, but now within the Landcommissariat of Homburg in the Rheinkreis (the Palatinate under Bavarian rule). The Canton of Waldmohr now contained 57 villages, estates and mills. That same year, the village was given a magistrates’ court. In 1824, the common schoolhouse was built on Bahnhofstraße (“Railway Station Street”). A new steeple was dedicated in 1831 on the occasion of the Silver Jubilee of King Maximilian I Joseph's coronation. In 1834, the municipality founded Catholic education. Completed in 1850 was the town hall, which also housed the court, which from the very beginning caused a space problem. Only in 1901 could the municipality open its own courthouse – today a community centre – and at the same time a forester's office across the street. In 1855, a post office was set up in Waldmohr, in its own building.

In 1873, the Waldmohr municipal health insurance fund took up its healthcare function, and was only dissolved on 31 December 1913 by the Reichsversicherungsordnung (“Imperial Insurance Order”), whereupon it was taken over by the general health insurance fund. Journalism began in Waldmohr in 1892 with the publication of the first edition of the Waldmohrer Zeitung (meaning simply “Waldmohr Newspaper”), and in 1895, the first master forester for the Waldmohr forester's office region was named.

In 1916, electric light came to Waldmohr, after gaslights had replaced petroleum lamps in 1905. The Waldziegelhütte, on the other hand, had been electrified in 1914, the same year that a motorized bus route began running from Waldmohr to Bexbach, Oberbexbach and the Frankenholz mine. A telephone exchange was built on Bahnhofstraße in 1928.

From 1920 until the Saar's reintegration into Germany in 1935, after Adolf Hitler and the Nazis had swept the Weimar Republic away and instituted the Third Reich, Waldmohr was a border village. One consequence was that Waldmohr was split away from the Bezirksamt (equivalent to Kreis – district) of Homburg to which it had belonged, and a branch location of the Bezirksamt of Kusel was therefore set up in Waldmohr for all municipalities that had likewise belonged to the now occupied Bezirksamt. In 1927, a branch location of the Kusel labour office was also located in the village.

With the approach of the Second World War, the first fortifications began to appear in Waldmohr's municipal area in 1938. This was part of the Westwall, commonly known in English as the Siegfried Line. There were tank trenches, dragon's teeth, bunkers and road barriers, all installed by Organisation Todt. In the autumn of that year, more than two thousand soldiers (horse-drawn artillery) were posted to the Kuhwald. Until 1995, a big horse's drinking trough recalled this event. Organisation Todt built the Siegfried Line's second Main Battle Line (Hauptkampflinie, HKL) in and around Waldmohr, with more than 30 bunkers (although 70 had been planned). On Kristallnacht (9–10 November 1938), SS commandoes from outside the village perpetrated great destruction at Jewish villagers’ homes, particularly at Dr. Salomon's (dentist) and Dr. Levi's (general practitioner), among others. In 1944, more fortifications, trenches, dams and road barriers were laid out, along with so-called Tobruk bunkers. During the war, bombs fell on Höcherstraße and Glanstraße (streets), as well as in the surrounding countryside, causing deaths and damage to houses.

After the war, from 1946 to 1960, Waldmohr once again became a border village as the Saar was once again occupied by the victorious Allies. Shortly after the 1948 currency reform, though, new businesses were coming to the municipality and setting up industrial operations. In 1958, the labour office branch and the municipal revenue agency were housed in a new office building on the street then called Hauptstraße (“Main Street”, but now called Saarpfalzstraße, or “Saar-Palatinate Street”). In 1960, a 70-hectare commercial-industrial park began to open up in the Kuhwald and on the heath. In 1964, a modern school with a gymnasium and a small indoor swimming pool was opened. In 1971, the Verbandsgemeinde of Waldmohr was founded, with Waldmohr itself as the administrative seat. Besides Waldmohr, the new Verbandsgemeinde comprised Dunzweiler and Breitenbach. In 1980, the municipality celebrated its 1,150-year jubilee by dedicating a new marketplace and the new village centre. On 6 October 2020, Waldmohr received town rights from the government of Rhineland-Palatinate.

=== Population development ===
Waldmohr was as early as the Middle Ages one of the bigger villages. In 1312, forty farmers were living there. According to Tilemann Stella, it was 43 in 1547. In 1609, the village had 225 Reformed inhabitants in 42 households, according to a church protocol. The population was greatly reduced in the Thirty Years' War, leaving only six subjects (families) in Waldmohr in 1655 (seven years after the war ended). Nonetheless, the number of families rose again quickly, but then the Nine Years' War wrought further decimation. A 1675 record reads “Waldmohr, burnt down, 16 families”.

During the 18th century, growth became continuous, although by now, a few families were emigrating. In 1696, there were 24 “hearth places” (households; 1 clergyman, 1 schoolteacher, 15 farmers, 1 cooper, 1 cabinetmaker, 1 shepherd, 2 maids, 3 menservants and 3 day labourers). In 1718, 42 residences were counted in Waldmohr; by 1760 this had risen to 70. In 1813, in late Napoleonic times, Waldmohr had 683 inhabitants. Old documents convey to the modern reader only a few villagers’ names, and indeed until the early 15th century, usually only first names were recorded. An “immigration patent” issued by the Duke of Zweibrücken after the 1648 Peace of Westphalia was meant to raise the region's population after the wartime devastation. Only a second such patent issued in 1698 by Duke Karl XII met with great success, bringing many families from Switzerland to Waldmohr (Munzinger, Agne, Hollinger, Sandmeyer, Danner, Gerhard, Bächle, Blum, Burckhardt, Klein, Keller, Cloß, Jakoby, Kurtz).

According to the original 1845 cadastral survey, it seems that destitution (division of inheritance, hunger, early death) and the 1848/1849 political upheavals were the main forces driving people to emigrate from the region. Many names are accompanied by notes such as “out of the country – in the land of America”. Nevertheless, in the latter half of the 19th century, ever more people were coming to Waldmohr, even with the fee for becoming a local citizen having been set at 102.85 marks in 1878. During the building of the Nordfeldbahndamm – a railway embankment – between 1902 and 1904, several Italians were employed who settled in the village. The two world wars exacted a heavy toll in blood, particularly the Second World War, which claimed many victims. With the separation of the Saar from the rest of Germany after both world wars, many customs officials and their families came to Waldmohr. Both in Weimar times and after the Second World War, miners’ families moved to the Ruhr area or the Aachen mining region either out of need for work or for better wages. In the 1940s and 1950s, ethnic Germans driven out of Germany's former eastern territories came to settle in Waldmohr. Only the location of industry and opening of valuable building land over the past few decades, however, coupled with good infrastructure development over that time, has led to steady population growth through migration, mainly from the Homburg area, Neunkirchen and the Glan valley. Also, quite a few Turkish families came beginning in 1971. After the Soviet Union's downfall, many ethnically German families from Kazakhstan and Kyrgyzstan – former Volga Germans and Black Sea Germans – came to the village. The commonest names in the village these days are still Bächle, Bauer, Becker, Blum, Braun, Burkart/Burkhardt, Ecker, Emich, Hoffmann, Jung, Kampa, Keller, Kiefer, Klein, Krupp, Leibrock, Lothschütz, Maurer, Metzger, Müller, Rapp, Schäfer, Schmidt/Schmitt, Schneider, Schwarz, Simon, Trumm, Wagner, Weber, Weiß/Weis/Weiss, Wolf, Wunn and Zimmer.

The following table shows population development over the centuries for Waldmohr, with some figures broken down by religious denomination:

Year	1825	1835	1871	1905	1939	1961	1995	2007
Total	1,025	1,191	1,193	1,762	2,245	2,965	5,711	5,310
Catholic	128					806
Evangelical	884					2,117
Jewish	13					–

=== Municipality’s name ===
As early as prehistoric and protohistoric times, the Waldmohr area was settled, as archaeological finds (such as blades, small lacrymatories, remnants of smelting ovens) and barrows bear witness. The first documentary mention dates from AD 830 and is found in a document from Lorsch Abbey, the Lorsch codex (also known as the Reichsurbar, Codex Laureshamensis; kept at the State Archive in Munich), in which the three royal estates of Lutra, Nannenstuol and Mörahha are named (the last one corresponding with the second syllable in “Waldmohr”). The name's meaning comes mainly from the Old High German terms mor for “wetland” (Old English had the same word, and the English “moor” and the German Moor are both still used today) and ahha for either “brook” or “water”. A few researchers, however, derive the mör part of the name from the Latin mora, which can mean either a stay or a rhetorical pause (a royal estate as a rest stop?).

The word ahha crops up a number of times in Old High German poetry from Carolingian times, spelt with only one H, thus aha, and always means “water”. Over the centuries, the village called itself, using various spellings, mora, Mohra, More, Moir, Mohr and mor or Mor. Only in 1418 did the name Waltmore crop up. The name, later Waltmor, Waltmohr, Waldmoor, Waldtmohr and eventually Waldmohr, only became generally customary in the 17th century; the prefix was meant to distinguish “Mohr” from other, nearby, similarly named places such as Kirchmohr, Niedermohr and Obermohr, among others.

== Religion ==
In the time of the Reformation, under the principle of cuius regio, eius religio, all the inhabitants had to convert, at the Duke's behest, to Lutheranism, that is, until 1588, when Duke Johannes I made them all convert once again, this time to Calvinism. Only beginning in 1648 – after the Thirty Years' War – could Lutherans, Reformed believers and Catholics once more live side-by-side in the Duchy of Palatine Zweibrücken.

With the new arrangement of parish areas in 1821, Dunzweiler, along with the Waldziegelhütte, passed to the parish of Breitenbach, and to make for a fair endowment, the parochial estate in Waldmohr was also signed over to the parish of Breitenbach. The parish still holds property in Waldmohr to this day. In 1902, the Catholic community, which belonged to the parish of Kübelberg, had 371 souls. Only in 1929 did Waldmohr welcome its own pastor. The two Catholic parishes of Waldmohr and Breitenbach would thereafter be administered together. The oldest church or chapel likely stood on the stony ridge, upon which the later church was built, upon whose foundations and walls, in turn, the current Protestant church from 1765 stands. It was said to be at that time a village hub of sorts, and the first known graveyard in the village – the churchyard – was there. In 1814, another graveyard was laid out in the Krämmel (a cadastral area), and expanded in 1852. The current graveyard in the Brüchelchen dates from 1898. This has already twice been expanded, and in 1958 it got a new mortuary. In 1924, a forest graveyard was also built at the Waldziegelhütte, right at Saint Mary's Chapel (Marienkapelle), likewise built at that time.

In August 1923, the Catholic parish's long planned so-called “Emergency Church” (Notkirche) was consecrated. It was later torn down, and on its former site arose Saint George’s Church (St. Georgskirche) in 1960. The “White Hall” (Weiße Halle), a Catholic parish community centre, was likewise torn down. It had at one time housed a shoe factory and outlet. Now it was to get a new building and it went into service as a meeting place in 1992. In 1866, the Stumm organ at the Protestant church was dedicated.

At the time when the Palatine Union came into effect in 1818, which united the Reformed and Lutheran churches, the small Lutheran parish had all together 620 parishioners, 130 of whom lived in Waldmohr.

== Politics ==
=== Municipal council ===
The council is made up of 22 council members, who were elected by proportional representation at the municipal election held on 7 June 2009, and the honorary mayor as chairman.

The municipal election held on 7 June 2009 yielded the following results:

Year	SPD	CDU	FDP	FWG	Total
2009	13	5	3	1	22 seats
2004	12	6	2	2	22 seats

“FWG” is a voters’ group.

=== Mayor ===
Waldmohr's mayor is Jürgen Schneider (SPD).

=== Coat of arms ===
The municipality's arms might be described thus: Per fess gules a lion rampant couped at the line of partition at the knees argent, and Or the letters W and M interlaced in pale sable.

Until 1982, Waldmohr bore different, but nonetheless very similar, arms. The main difference was in the tinctures, whereas the charges were almost the same. The field tinctures were argent and sable (silver and black) while the lion, which was a demilion in the old arms (couped at the waist rather than the knees as in the newer arms), was azure armed and langued gules (blue, but with red claws and tongue) and the two interlaced letters were argent. Those arms had been approved in 1925, and the change was brought about after an expert opinion from Dr. Debus that cited the much longer time that Waldmohr had spent under the Counts of Homburg than under the Counts of Veldenz. Accordingly, the Veldenz lion was changed for the Homburg one. The lower field's tinctures represent the Palatine colours, and the two letters, W and M, may well be a municipal mark, for Waldmohr.

In the 19th century, when a professor from Munich suggested using a Moor's head as a charge in the coat of arms, the municipal council was outraged and bluntly refused the suggestion. This would, of course, have made the arms canting, for the word used for this charge was Mohrenkopf (Kopf means “head”).

=== Town partnerships ===
Waldmohr fosters partnerships with the following places:

- Is-sur-Tille, Côte-d'Or (Burgundy), France since 3 April 2004

== Culture and sightseeing ==
=== Buildings ===
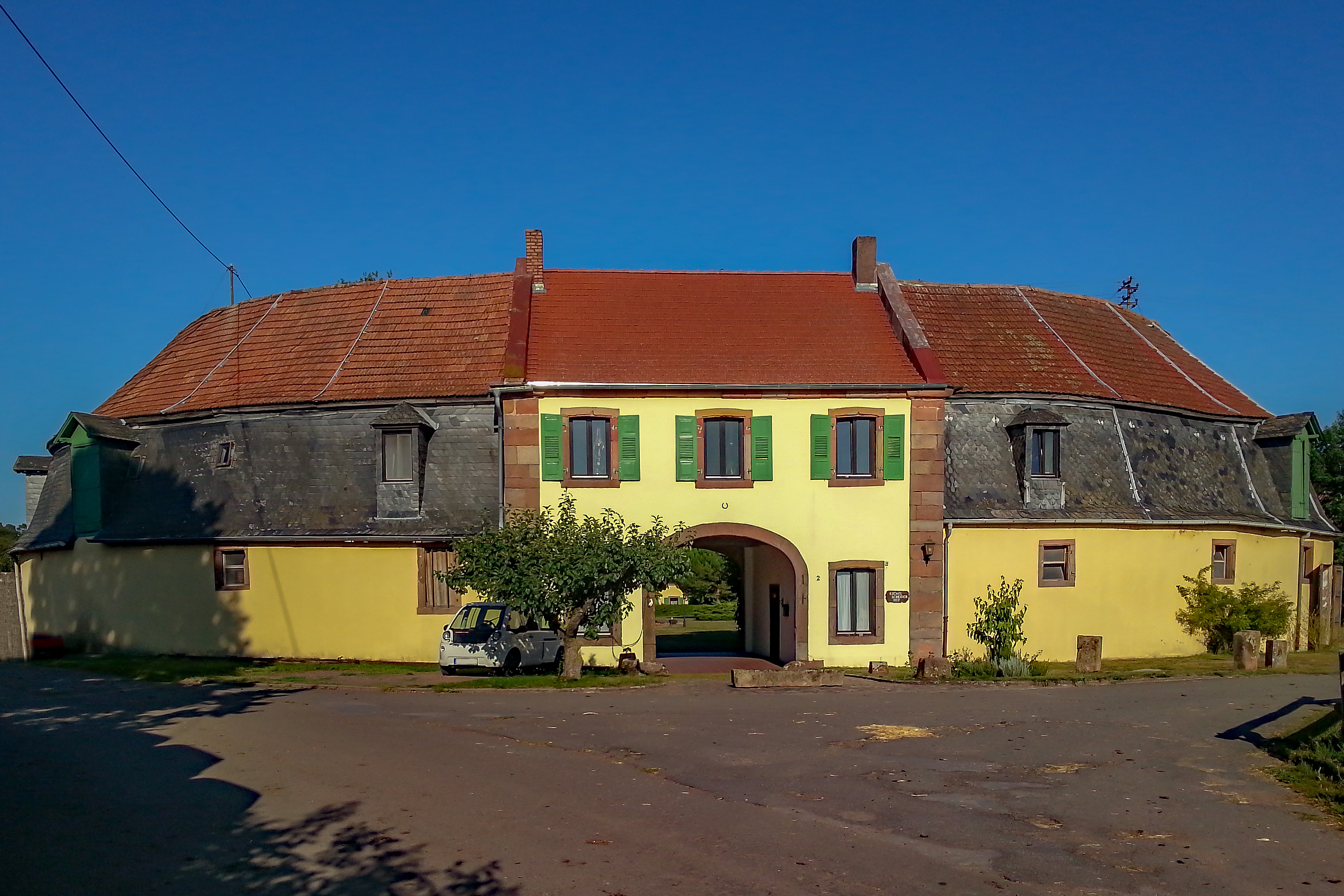
Eichelscheiderhof 2–5: former Ducal Zweibrücken stud farm, Eichelscheider Hof

The following are listed buildings or sites in Rhineland-Palatinate’s Directory of Cultural Monuments:

==== Waldmohr (main centre) ====
- Protestant parish church, Blücherstraße 3 – aisleless church, marked 1765, architect Philipp Heinrich Hellermann, Zweibrücken, expansion 1903, tower, marked 1831, on Late Gothic ground floor; Stumm organ from 1861
- Bahnhofstraße 45 – former post office; building with hipped roof, Swiss chalet style, 1926, architect Heinrich Müller, Speyer
- Eichelscheiderstraße – warriors’ memorial 1914-1918 and 1939-1945, base by F. Cullmann and B. Marx, Waldmohr, soldier sculpture by Ludwig Rech, Zweibrücken, 1930, added to after 1945; across street memorial stone for the victims of National Socialism
- Rathausstraße 3 – rectory; Classicist plastered building, 1864-1866; characterizes village's appearance; attendant former clergyman's garden and barn
- Rathausstraße 12/14 – town hall and until 1901 Royal Bavarian Amt court; stone-block building on pedestal floor with hipped roof, Rundbogenstil, 1849/1850, architect Regional Building Officer Portscheller, Homburg; characterizes village's appearance
- At Rathausstraße 37 – fountain well, stone trough, cast-iron post, earlier half of the 19th century
- Rathausstraße 1, 2, 3, 4, 5, 6, 7, 12/14, 16, village core (monumental zone) – village core around intersection of Blücherstraße and Höcher Straße with Hauptstraße, with church and town hall, commercial houses and farmhouses from the 18th and 19th centuries
- Saarpfalzstraße 11 – forestry office; sandstone-block building, 1901, architect Christian Jakoby, Waldmohr, shed from time of building
- Saarpfalzstraße 12 – former Royal Bavarian Amt court; U-shaped sandstone-block building, risalto with crow-stepped gable, 1900/1901
- Former “Consolidiertes Nordfeld” mine (monumental zone) – foundation of the twin headframe and engine house, tailing heaps, former railway right-of-way, about 1900
- Former Nordfeld mine loading ramp, on the Weiherstraße extension in the forest – ramp some 8 m high, 1902

==== Eichelscheiderhof ====
- Eichelscheiderhof 2–5 – former Eichelscheider Hof Ducal Zweibrücken stud farm; one-floor horseshoe-shaped stable building with two-floor gatehouse, dwelling and commercial building, high hipped roofs, 1752-1757

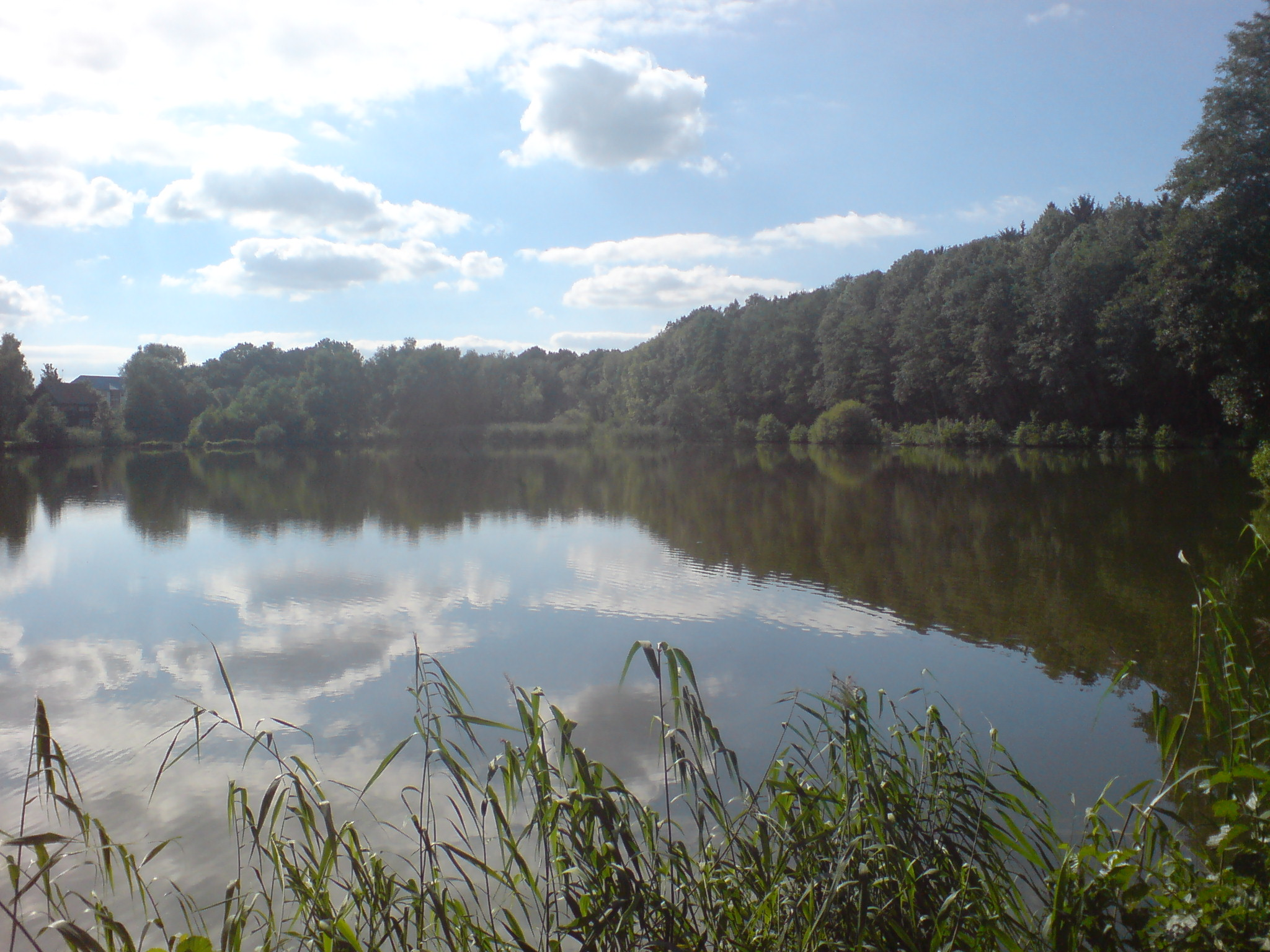
The Mohrmühlweiher, colloquially called the Motschweiher, on the edge of the village going towards the Eichelscheiderhof.

=== Music ===
Well known is the Westricher Madrigalchor (the Westrich is an historic region that encompasses areas in both Germany and France), a mixed choir that in 1998 sprang from the singing association (Sängervereinigung), under the direction of Thomas Gräff.

The Musikverein Waldmohr e.V. was founded, in its current form, on 8 October 1922. The first official mention of a “Waldmohr Music Club” was on the occasion of the fourth Palatine Music Festival (Pfälzisches Musikfest), which was held in Speyer in January 1830. Today, the Musikverein Waldmohr is made up of a youth wind orchestra and a saxophone quartet.

=== Clubs ===
Cultural life in Waldmohr is characterized by a very active and multifaceted branch location of the district folk high school, the Sängervereinigung 1872, the Catholic church choir, the Protestant singing circle, the Musikverein with its various music groups, the promotional circle for art, and various other sporting, social and community service clubs:

- TV Waldmohr (sport club)
- VfB Waldmohr (sport club)
- HSV Waldmohr (sport club)
- ASV Waldmohr (sport club)
- Schützenverein Waldmohr (shooting club)
- Reit- und Fahrverein Waldmohr (equestrian club)
- TC Waldmohr (tennis club)
- Behinderten-Sportclub Waldmohr (disabled sports)
- DLRG
- Karateclub Waldmohr
- Verein „Dorf für Kinder“ (“Village for Children”)
- Pfälzerwaldverein Waldmohr (hiking)
- Obst- und Gartenbauverein Waldmohr (gardening and fruitgrowing)
- DRK (German Red Cross)
- Pensionärverein Waldmohr (pensioners’ club)
- Both churches, with their many bodies and groups
- VdK (advocacy group)
- Reservisten-Kameradschaft (military)
- “Krea-Mief” theatre club

=== Regular events ===
Besides the various Shrovetide (Fastnacht) events held by some clubs, the dance in May, the Marketplace Festival, the kermis (church consecration festival), the Christmas Market, the Dörrbergfest and the Weiherfest held by the clubs and parties, there is hardly any upholding of old customs, unless the kindergartens’ yearly Martinmas parades are counted (11 November). Also, on Epiphany, the Sternsinger go door-to-door. The primary school-Hauptschule choir actively participates in many municipal events.

=== Natural monuments ===
Within municipal limits lies the “Bruchwiesen Waldmohr” recreation area, within which the river Glan has been renaturated. Regarded as a natural monument is the Heldenhain (“Heroes’ Grove”) with its stand of limetrees. The old oaktree standing on the north slope of the Dörrberg is considered worthy of protection and is to be incorporated into the municipal plan as such.

== Economy and infrastructure ==
=== Agriculture ===
In recent decades, the amount of land under agricultural use has been slowly but steadily shrinking with the decline of full-time and even part-time farming. More than half the agricultural land is still cropland. The greenbelt areas make up about 45% of it, and land used for special cultivation hardly 1%; these have no economic importance. Grain farming has been decreasing since 1971. Potato farming claims the lion's share of the cropland. Fodder farming has even grown, leading to growth in livestock rearing, too. Over the last few decades, cattle and swine have been growing in numbers, even though the odd farming operation has been given up.

=== Woodland ===
As mentioned above, Waldmohr had 563.9 ha of wooded land in 1990. This represents a gain of 5% over the total wooded land in 1970. Extensive common beech forests dominate, and only in the Eichelscheid area are spruce and pine the main trees. The woods on the Dörrberg and Eichelscheid in particular have a protective function, and a recreational function. The Schachenwald is set out as a recreational forest for seniors and also serves as a noise barrier and valuable stand of trees.

=== Industry and employment ===
Before industrialization, almost all the villagers worked as farmers, craftsmen, day labourers, tradesmen, forestry workers or bureaucrats. After the middle of the 19th century, many went to work at the ironworks in Homburg and Neunkirchen, and later to the mines on the Nordfeld, in Frankenholz and in Neunkirchen. With the coalmine shutdowns and the onset of the steel crisis in the 1960s, Waldmohr began with the laying out of a 70-hectare commercial-industrial park, bringing the village many new jobs; thus today, 2,700 workers earn their livelihoods here. Nevertheless, more and more people commute to jobs elsewhere.

Waldmohr earns its living today mainly from industrial operations and craft businesses. It is the district's biggest industrial location. The biggest employer, with roughly 590 employees as of 2000, is the firm CS Schmal Möbel GmbH (furniture). Over the last few years, the firm Minitec, founded in 1986, has grown greatly. As of 2006, it has roughly 190 employees. The firm has at its disposal a patent for aluminium parts whereby drilling is no longer needed. Of the many small craft businesses of bygone days, little is left. The smith, the wainwright, the locksmith and cabinetmakers of all descriptions are no longer found in the village. There are, however, a shoemaker’s shop, a butcher’s shop, a bakery, a furrier’s shop, two roofing businesses, three barber/hairdresser’s shops, a carpentry business, a plasterer’s shop and two painting businesses, which can be described as ordinary craft businesses. Other businesses in Waldmohr are a wholesale bakery, five sanitary businesses, three electrical speciality shops, five automotive repair shops, three building companies, a sawmill, a sculpture studio, two tiler’s businesses, two craft metalworking shops and a wholesale metalworking business. Among other small and midsize businesses are a marble workshop, a printing shop, a furniture factory, a prefabricated building business and prefabricated cellar manufacturer, a drywall-making business and a window-making business.

Since the introduction of the weekly market in 1993 – market day is Saturday – the market has been well received by the villagers. Moreover, the various flea markets and the Christmas market enjoy great popularity. Unfortunately, the Turnerjahrmarkt (“Gymnasts’ Yearly Market”) has in recent years fallen by the wayside.

In addition to Schmal's employment of 450 or so, a number of other companies are important employers. The firm Kampa, which makes high-quality prefabricated houses, currently employs 320 people at its Waldmohr works. Working at the firms Metronic and WIG von Grünenwald are 120 and 50 employees respectively. Stehma has a workforce of 75 building steel halls. A notary, two lawyers and several architectural offices have a great deal to do.

Despite Waldmohr's emergent industry, 1,069 workers commute daily to the Saarland, 855 of them to Homburg alone. Commuting to Kaiserslautern and other workplaces in the Palatinate are 362 workers. On the other hand, there is also a daily inflow of commuters, 384 of whom come from the Saarland, 528 from other places in the Kusel district and 64 from elsewhere in the Palatinate. There has been an upward trend in inbound commuters in recent years.

=== Public institutions ===
Waldmohr is home to the administration of the like-named Verbandsgemeinde.

=== Education ===
It was in 1564, in a Visitation report by the clergyman, that a school in the village was first mentioned, but apparently, it did not have its own building. Such a thing as a schoolhouse in Waldmohr was not mentioned until 1605. A 1613 report said that nobody in the village could read or write. Learning was not very efficient, and hence only met with slight success. The teachers were so poorly paid that they often had to put up with hunger. A teacher's wages were first mentioned in 1589. The teacher at the Reformed school received 4 Malter of grain and 8 Gulden in gold from the church treasury, and from the municipality 2 Malter of grain for ringing the bells. In 1596, the then schoolteacher received a small amount of land for the schoolyard as remuneration. Nevertheless, no teacher ever stayed very long before seeking a better paying job. After the Thirty Years' War, the historical record tells of a school in Waldmohr once again in 1659, eleven years after the war had ended. Employment there was, however, apparently no better after all those years, for the teachers were still changing so often that the post was often left unfilled. Only in 1728 was this pattern broken, when schoolteacher Schwartz from Quirnbach came to Waldmohr and stayed until his death in 1761. In the earlier half of the 18th century, the Lutherans and the Catholics likewise each had their own school. Attending the Reformed school in 1783 were 79 pupils, while in 1809, the Lutheran school had 25. The earliest figures for the Catholic school come from 1825, when it had 25 pupils. All together, there were 256 schoolchildren attending the village's schools that year, leading the government to institute a third teaching post (by this time, there was Lutheran-Reformed unity). It was for the Catholic school. The Catholic teacher's yearly salary was 200 Gulden. The Protestant teachers were paid 450 Gulden; this was not all in cash, however. It was made up of a dwelling, a garden, a hillside plot, 2 Morgen of meadowland, 6 hL of grain, 3 klafters of wood, from each of 120 households 1 barrel of grain, from each of 160 schoolchildren 1 Gulden in cash from the church treasury, the municipal coffer and special ecclesiastical events. The recompense was also split between two teachers. The head teacher got 250 Gulden with the remaining 200 Gulden going to his assistant. In 1862, teachers’ salaries were reformed and payments in kind were dropped. In 1870, a continuation school (Fortbildungsschule) was established whose classes ran from November to early February each year. At this time, the municipality had three schools, two Protestant and one Catholic.

With the establishment of the communal Christian school in 1877, teachers’ salaries were reformed yet again. Under the new terms (1878), each member of the teaching staff received 897.38 marks. In 1901, superannuation payments were specially introduced, and teachers’ pay was in 1905 raised to 1,500 marks. The Fortbildungsschule, which had long been run as a Sunday school (inasmuch as classes were held on Sunday; it was not religious), became a Wednesday afternoon school beginning in 1906. In 1935, the eighth school year was introduced, in 1966/1967 the ninth and in 1991/1992 the tenth.

The Rothenfeldschule is a combined primary school and Regionale Schule with the tenth class. Since the 2007/2008 school year it has been the only school in Rhineland-Palatinate to offer year-round daycare.

=== Public utilities ===
On Breitenbacher Straße stands a modern electrical substation owned by Pfalzwerke, which ensures the electrical supply for both home and industry. Waldmohr manages to do without any partnerships to ensure its water supply, having its own deep wells, pumphouses and cisterns. A sewage treatment plant costing 10,000,000 DM (about €5,113,000), built to handle a capacity of 10,000 inhabitants, has been brought into service and uses the most modern wastewater treatment. The whole village is supplied with both electricity and natural gas. At the turn of the 20th century, the village even owned its own gasworks, although this was shut down in the First World War owing to unprofitability.

=== Transport ===
Saarpfalzstraße, which was built as a relief and bypass road for the former Hauptstraße (now Rathausstraße), is now the main road within the municipality, and as Bundesstraße 423 also the most important road for through traffic. Also particularly busy within the municipality are Landesstraße 354, leading to the commercial-industrial park and, by way of Landesstraße 355, to interchange 50 on the Autobahn A 6 (Saarbrücken–Mannheim) – sometimes called Via Carolina – and the Waldmohr service centre with its motel, and Kreisstraße (District Road) 3 from the village centre to Höchen and Bexbach. Also heavily frequented are Bahnhofstraße and Rathausstraße. As early as 1985, the daily number of vehicles at the edge of the village going towards Kübelberg reached 4,852, and at the edge of the village going towards Jägersburg, it reached 5,505. The Autobahn links Waldmohr not only to the national road network, but also to France and the Czech Republic.

The Nordfeldbahn (railway) was built in 1903. The railway line from Homburg to Bad Münster, dedicated in 1904, was closed in 1981. The last passenger train was a three-unit railbus that with the end of the 1980-1981 winter timetable did its last run between Glan-Münchweiler and Homburg on 30 May 1981 – complete with a bunch of gorse fastened onto the front. In 1990, the tracks were torn up and in 1993, the bridge across Landesstraße 354 was torn down, leaving only an industrial spur between the Waldmohr commercial-industrial park and Homburg.

Public transport is integrated into the VRN. The Glantalbahn (railway), which once ran through Waldmohr, is no longer used along this stretch of the right-of-way. The nearest line is now the Saarbrücken-Heidelberg line, which runs some 6 km south of Waldmohr. Bus routes run by Regionalbus Saar-Westpfalz link Waldmohr with Homburg Central Station, Bruchmühlbach-Miesau and Landstuhl, all on that railway line. Kusel station at the district seat and Glan-Münchweiler station on the Landstuhl–Kusel railway can also be reached directly by bus.

== Famous people ==
=== Sons and daughters of the town ===
- Theodor Berkmann (1802–1870), jurist, politician and revolutionary
- Ludwig Ritterspacher (1883–1964), politician (CDU)
- Fritz Schwitzgebel (1888–1957), politician (NSDAP)
- Kurt Eichner (1898–1969), politician (NSDAP)
- Eugen Kampa (1913–????), a carpenter by trade, he married a building-element entrepreneur's daughter in Minden, and in 1945 he took over his father-in-law's business, expanding it into an important maker of prefabricated houses with 17 locations; Kampa-Werk II was in Waldmohr.
- Georg Fleischer (d. 1973), a furniture manufacturer, he owned a furniture factory in Eilenburg, Saxony that was expropriated in East German times; he settled in Waldmohr in 1951, where he founded a new factory, which at times employed more than 100 employees and made the well known Pfalzmöbel line of furniture; after Fleischer's death, the factory soon failed.
