= Dunzweiler =

- Municipality
- Coat of arms

- Location of Dunzweiler within Kusel district
- Interactive map of Dunzweiler
- Location within Germany Location within Rhineland-Palatinate
- Coordinates: 49°24′57″N 7°18′20″E
- Country: Germany
- State: Rhineland-Palatinate
- District: Kusel
- Municipal assoc.: Oberes Glantal

Government
  - Mayor (2019–24): Volker Korst (CDU)

Area
  - Total: 5.52 km^{2} (2.13 sq mi)
- Elevation: 352 m (1,155 ft)

Population (2025-12-31)
  - Total: 849
  - Density: 154/km^{2} (398/sq mi)
- Time zone: UTC+01:00 (CET)
  - Summer (DST): UTC+02:00 (CEST)
- Postal codes: 66916
- Dialling codes: 06373
- Vehicle registration: KUS
- Website: www.dunzweiler.de

Dunzweiler is an Ortsgemeinde – a municipality belonging to a Verbandsgemeinde, a kind of collective municipality – in the Kusel district in Rhineland-Palatinate, Germany. It belongs to the Verbandsgemeinde of Oberes Glantal.

== Geography ==
=== Location ===
The municipality lies between Kaiserslautern and Saarbrücken in the Kusel Musikantenland (“Minstrels’ Land”) in the Western Palatinate, on the state boundary with the Saarland. Its elevation is 352 m above sea level. The village stretches across several mountain ridges through which the Klingbach and its tributaries cut. The ridges are among the Höcherberg's foothills (although the Höcherberg itself lies within the Saarland). The municipal area's northern reaches, and also an area in the south, are held to be agricultural lands, while other areas in the south are part of the extensive woodlands, which also stretch well beyond the municipality's limits. The greatest elevation within municipal limits is the Eulenkopf (“Owl’s Head”; 469 m above sea level) in the municipality's northwest, while the lowest spot, at roughly 300 m above sea level, can be found in the east where the Klingbach flows out of the municipality downstream from the mill and the sewage treatment plant. The municipal area measures 533 ha, of which roughly 190 ha is settled and 166 ha is wooded.

=== Neighbouring municipalities ===
Dunzweiler borders in the north and northeast on the municipality of Dittweiler, in the east on the municipality of Schönenberg-Kübelberg, in the south on the municipality of Waldmohr, in the southwest on the town of Bexbach, in the west on the town of Ottweiler and in the northwest on the municipality of Breitenbach.

=== Constituent communities ===
Also belonging to Dunzweiler are the outlying homesteads of Frauenfelderhöfe (two of these, hence the plural name), Lacherwaldhof, Dunzweilermühle with Talstraße (“Dale Road”) and part of the Waldziegelhütte, most of which lies within Waldmohr's limits.

=== Municipality’s layout ===
The built-up area's main axis is Hauptstraße (“Main Street”), which comes into the village from Schönenberg-Kübelberg, but hardly in a straight line, for there are many bends, some quite broad, both within the village and to the southwest. Sprouting off this road near the Dunzweilermühle is Talstraße. Upstream from this small outlying settlement lies yet another, albeit newer one near the graveyard. Beyond this, one reaches the old village core near the Evangelical church, while the roads leading out of the village, towards both Waldmohr and Breitenbach, feature newer built-up zones. The former schoolhouse stands in the old village core. The new Catholic church likewise stands on Hauptstraße, but higher up than the Evangelical church on a hillock. A forest fairground (Waldfestplatz) lies south of the village on the edge of the woods, while the sporting ground lies outside the village to the west on the road from Breitenbach to Waldmohr.

== History ==
=== Antiquity ===
According to Bantelmann (writing in 1972), there is supposedly a prehistoric barrow to be found on the Hollerkopf in the village's southwest, although apparently, after an archaeological survey, it can no longer be made out. There are, however, richer finds from Roman times. According to Zenglein (although this is based on another writer's information, namely Egon Wagner's), there are the following sites at which archaeological finds have come to light in Dunzweiler:

- a villa rustica at the Lacherwald (forest), confirmed by trial digging;
- a further villa rustica in the strip field named Hübschweiler;
- two Viergöttersteine (“four-god stones”, pedestals on which a Jupiter Column was customarily stood), which were walled into the masonry as spolia at the Dunzweiler Evangelical church on the Heidenkopf, and which were described as early as the 16th century by Tilemann Stella and again by more recent archaeologists (Friedrich Sprater, for one);
- also spreading onto Waldmohr's municipal area in the Hengstwald (forest), remnants from Gallo-Roman times found long ago by farmers, and described in the 18th century by the Reverend Jodocus Selbach, who even wrote a poem about the finds on the Prince-Elector's behalf; these finds were in the past incorrectly said to be the “Sanctuary of Waldmohr”.

=== Middle Ages ===
It is likely that “Dunzo’s Homestead” (the name's original meaning) arose as early as Frankish times, thus before the 10th century. According to the document from Henry II, Count of Zweibrücken, containing Dunzweiler's first documentary mention (29 April 1247), Wilhelm von Duntzwilre and his wife Panzerte forwent a complaint against the nearby Wörschweiler Abbey over a plot of land, in return for which they were to be buried at the abbey upon their deaths. In 1264, it comes to light from a document from Loretta von Zweibrücken that a priest named Verculo forsook his property “zu Dunzwilr” (“at Dunzweiler”). In the same year Henry II documented that a priest at Dunzweiler named Johannes bequeathed all his holdings to Wörschweiler Abbey. According to this document, Dunzweiler belonged to the County of Zweibrücken, whose counts enfeoffed vassals with holdings in the village, foremost among them the Lords of Bitsch. In the early 15th century, the County of Zweibrücken was pledged, later being redeemed by Stephen of Electoral Palatinate, who out of his own inheritance from Electoral Palatinate, his wife Anna of Veldenz' from the now defunct County of Veldenz and the now redeemed County of Zweibrücken founded the County Palatine of Zweibrücken, which in the fullness of time came to be known as the Duchy of Palatinate-Zweibrücken. Nevertheless, lesser nobles had holdings in Dunzweiler that bit by bit were taken over by the Dukes of Zweibrücken. Two 15th-century Weistümer (a Weistum – cognate with English wisdom – was a legal pronouncement issued by men learned in law in the Middle Ages and early modern times) from Dunzweiler are still preserved. In 1487, the village burnt to the ground and was not fully restored for 80 years.

=== Modern times ===
Dunzweiler, as part of the Schultheißerei of Waldmohr, now shared a history with the County Palatine of Zweibrücken right up until that state's dissolution at the time of the French Revolution. In 1547, the first detailed information about Dunzweiler and its environs was to be found in the so-called Oberamtsbuch kept by the Oberamt of Zweibrücken, which was compiled on Duke Wolfgang's orders, and by way of the archaeological listings, the village appears repeatedly in Tilemann Stella's (a surveyor and cartographer from Siegen) 1564 Beschreibung der Ämter Zweibrücken und Kirkel (“Description of the Ämter of Zweibrücken and Kirkel”, a territory also known as the Dunzweiler Bann). It says, for instance, on page 28, in archaic German: “Fortan gehet die grenitz berguber biß zu einem Ort, im Hohen Teich genannt. Dieser Ort schaidet Duntzweiller und Ditweiller. Von dan gehet die oberkait gemach bergin bis zu einem marckstein. Dieser marckstein wirt genannt oben am Hundthauser teich bei der Krelesaichen. Er hatt ein creutz unnd schaidet Duntzweiller und Diweiller, diß ist Pfältzisch unndt höret inns Reich.” (“Henceforth the border goes over the mountain to a place named ‘im Hohen Teich’. This place divides Duntzweiller and Ditweiller. Thence, the authority goes into the mountains to a borderstone. This borderstone is named up above at the Hundthaus pond near the Krelesaichen. It has a cross and divides Duntzweiller and Ditweiller, this is Palatine and belongs in the Empire.”). During the course of the 16th century, Count (Duke) John I of Zweibrücken finally managed to acquire all foreign lordly rights in Dunzweiler, completing the acquisition on 27 April 1577. In 1609 came the first complete list of Dunzweiler’s inhabitants in the form of a directory of parishioners belonging to the parish branch of Dunzweiler. It was compiled by the Reverend Simon Metzler, the parish priest at Ohmbach, to which Dunzweiler was parochially attached. This list may well also represent the village’s population figure – roughly 120 persons – just before the Thirty Years' War, which brought great hardship, misery and sickness (foremost, the Plague) along with it. Dunzweiler was not spared in the Conquest of Kaiserslautern, either, falling victim to plundering and being set on fire. Most of the village’s farmers and craftsmen likely died in this time. The war was brought to an end in 1648 with the Peace of Westphalia. After great fluctuations in the population in the years that followed, the first population figures known from the years after the Thirty Years’ War were 7 families in 1675 and 14 in 1704, whereas some villages in the broader area had died right out in the war. Some inhabitants had fled and were now staying in faraway places. On 12 February 1673, the municipality, which had been settled once again, enacted its own municipal code (Gemeindeordnung), which prescribed a police force. The code, which was read aloud every year, was officially confirmed by the Amt of Zweibrücken.

In the early 18th century there was a serious dispute with the neighbouring village of Dittweiler. The land that was the subject of this dispute is still known today as Streitgewann (roughly “Dispute Strip”). This comes from a hitherto unknown entry in a church book. Closer examination of this source has also brought to light that during the Inquisition in the Duchy of Palatinate-Zweibrücken under Heinrich Kramer (c. 1430-c. 1505), Dunzweiler was the scene of local violent crimes. A “stock book” has survived from 1756 or 1759. It was compiled by the Duchy of Palatinate-Zweibrücken and used information gathered by land surveyors to determine who owned how much land, and in which fields. Also listed in this book was a figure of 30 to 35 houses in Dunzweiler.

Following in 1776 were the Huldigungslisten (“homage lists”), a list of Dunzweiler subjects at that time in homage to Charles II August, Duke of Zweibrücken, who had just (on 5 November 1775) assumed the Duchy's leadership after his predecessor's death. This list, which came into being shortly before the French Revolution, counted 48 fathers heading families, 16 fully grown, unwed young men and two older inhabitants who, owing to age or infirmity, could not show up for the counting.

In 1793, the Duchy was conquered by invading French troops, putting Charles II August to flight, shortly whereafter his palace was burnt down. By 1805, Dunzweiler, along with the rest of the German lands on the Rhine’s left bank, had been annexed to Napoleon’s empire, within which the Commune de Dunzweiler found itself until 1814 in the Canton of Waldmohr, the Arrondissement of Sarrebruck (Saarbrücken) and the Department of Sarre, whose seat was at Trèves (Trier). In 1805, the French administration had a plan géometrique of Dunzweiler laid out, that is, a map with building areas and divisions of farm fields drawn in. This makes it clear that there was a great upswing in the village’s population in the 19th century. While there had been only 50 houses in Dunzweiler in 1805, there were 96 in 1845.

==== Recent times ====
In 1814, the French withdrew from the German lands on the Rhine’s left bank, and after Napoleon’s defeat at Waterloo, the Congress of Vienna in 1816, after a transitional period, awarded the Baierische Rheinkreis (“Bavarian Rhenish District”), which was later known as the Bayerische Rheinpfalz (“Bavarian Rhenish Palatinate”), to the Kingdom of Bavaria, whose kings were descended from Charles II August, effectively Zweibrücken's last duke (the territory was occupied by the French when the last duke, his brother Maximilian, inherited the duchy). Dunzweiler thus became Bavarian.

In 1820, the first, and therefore oldest, mining tunnel was driven into the mountain above the road leading to Schmittweiler (nowadays a constituent community of Schönenberg-Kübelberg). Another was driven in the same place, and may have been worked even during the Franco-Prussian War (1870-1871). It was last brought into service after the First World War, but owing to stiff competition from mines in the Saarland, it was shut up for good in 1925.

The administrative entities that had arisen during French Revolutionary and Napoleonic times were for the most part kept. Dunzweiler now belonged to the Bürgermeisteramt (mayoral office) in the canton of Waldmohr in the Landkommissariat (later Bezirksamt) of Homburg. On 21 July 1845, the Bavarian administration began to compile land tax registers for each village, listing each landowner's holdings and his origins. In the original cadastre, 96 residential buildings, one church and 3,259 parcels of land were individually listed. Listed in the 1911/1912 Zweibrücken edition of the address book for the Western Palatinate is, among other things, a population figure of 707 for Dunzweiler.

The post-Napoleonic administrative structure remained unchanged until the end of the First World War, after which the district of Homburg was grouped into the British- and French-occupied Saar. The canton of Waldmohr was grouped into the newly founded Free State of Bavaria, thus remaining under German sovereignty within the new Weimar Republic. The canton of Waldmohr belonged, with an administrative outpost, to the Bezirksamt (district) of Kusel. In 1940, this Waldmohr administrative outpost was dissolved and merged into the district of Kusel. On 1 April 1948, under Mayor Alfred Pfaff, Dunzweiler was demerged from the municipality of Waldmohr, thus becoming self-administering. This was followed on 1 June by a registry office. Precisely a year later, on 1 June 1949, yet another mine tunnel was dug, this time with monies from the state government. This, however, like the others, ended up being shut down after taking a long time to build and yielding little in the way of returns. A further venture into mining, involving a test bore, was shelved by the Bundesregierung, even though an amount of 100,000 DM had already been approved for the project. No mining work has been done since. By 1954, there were 380 households in Dunzweiler and 1,086 persons. The following businesses were also to be found:

- 6 “colonial goods” shops
- 2 motor carrier businesses
- 1 sandstone quarry
- 2 threshing machine rental companies
- 1 gristmill
- 4 inns
- 1 diamond-cutting shop
- 1 textile wholesaler
- 1 shoe shop
- 1 greengrocer’s shop
- 1 metal goods shop
- 1 cinema

In the years 1956 and 1957, the state government built three outlying farming centres within Dunzweiler’s limits. These were the Lacherwaldhof and the two Frauenfelderhöfe (the form –höfe indicates plural), which are all still in operation today and contribute considerably to the municipality’s outlook. In 1959, the first sewerage was laid in Dunzweiler, and in 1961 the work was finished with the opening of a new sewage treatment plant. That same year, planning began for building a new schoolhouse, for the old one, which had been built in 1840, was simply too antiquated. The school was finally dedicated on 11 December 1964, and the old one was torn down three years later.

On 1 September 1971, Dunzweiler, along with Breitenbach and Waldmohr, was grouped as a self-administering Ortsgemeinde into the new Verbandsgemeinde of Waldmohr. In 1997, Dunzweiler celebrated 750 years of existence (since its first documentary mention).

=== Population development ===
Dunzweiler was originally a farming village all whose inhabitants also worked at crafts. From the mid 18th century onwards, many men also began working at coalmining with the growth of that industry, even outside the village. The same held true for the brickworks. Commuting, especially to the great collieries in the Saarland, had an early beginning. About 1900, there were roughly 90 miners, as against only 25 farmers among men who were active in Dunzweiler’s workforce. Very often, though, these two occupations combined to yield the job description called Bergmannsbauer (“miner-farmer”), which also yielded a particular kind of house. With the development of the West Palatine diamond-cutting industry, many inhabitants also found opportunities in this field. After the Second World War, agriculture was concentrated on ever fewer, and therefore bigger, operations. At first, farms worked as a secondary occupation expanded, only to disappear from the scene later. Traditional craft occupations met a similar fate, expanding along with the post-war rise in population only to be forsaken later on, rendered obsolete by newer occupations. Today, Dunzweiler is a residential community for people in the most varied of occupations, and a great many of today's local workforce must commute to earn their livelihoods. With respect to religion, about two thirds of the inhabitants are Evangelical and one third are Catholic.

The following table shows population development over the centuries for Dunzweiler, with some figures broken down by religious denomination:

| Year | 1825 | 1835 | 1871 | 1905 | 1961 | 2008 |
| Total | 469 | 525 | 488 | 628 | 1,131 | 981 |
| Catholic | 86 | | | | 411 |
| Evangelical | 383 | | | | 719 |

=== Municipality’s name ===
The village's name combines the common placename ending —weiler, meaning “hamlet” or, originally, “homestead”, with the personal name “Dunzo”, and thus the name Dunzweiler originally meant “Dunzo’s Homestead”. To be taken far less seriously, though, is the local “folk” explanation that the village was founded by three Dunzeln (apparently a word meaning “women”, although Duden defines it as ein Mensch, der schwer von Begriff ist, or roughly “a person who is slow on the uptake”). Through history, the village's name has taken the following forms, among others: Dunzwilre (1247), Dontzwilre (1336), Dunzwylr (1441), Dontzwiler (1485), Duntzwiller (1535), Dontzweiler (1659).

=== Vanished villages ===
In the Dunzweiler area once lay several villages that have since disappeared. Known from 1563 or 1564 is a place called Abenhausen, which would seem to be the same village named as Omborn in Tilemann Stella's 1564 Beschreibung der Ämter Zweibrücken und Kirkel (“Description of the Ämter of Zweibrücken and Kirkel”). It most likely lay in the south of today's village of Dunzweiler. Likewise named in Tilemann Stella's work is a village called Holzweiler, which most likely lay in the southeast. Hübschweiler, which might well also have lain south of today's village, was named in a 1405 document. North of Dunzweiler lay the village of Hundhausen, which Tilemann Stella marked on his map.

== Religion ==
From an 1108 document it comes to light that in 976, the parish of Ohmbach was transferred into the Disibodenberg Monastery's ownership. On the assumption that Dunzweiler, too, then belonged to the parish of Ohmbach, then it must also from that time onwards, until the mid 13th century, have been held by the monastery on the river Nahe. Its holdings on the Ohmbach and in the Oster valley passed to Count Gerlach V of Veldenz, who then bequeathed them to Wörschweiler Abbey. After the Reformation, Dunzweiler belonged to the Ohmbacher Pfarr, an ecclesiastical district that included not only Palatinate-Zweibrücken-held villages, but also some Electoral Palatinate ones. In 1561, though, the Electoral Palatinate villages were split away from the parish of Ohmbach, leaving Dunzweiler, as a Zweibrücken village, in the parish, but it was now geographically no longer contiguous with the parish seat, with Electoral Palatinate villages lying in between. The pastor from Ohmbach had the opportunity to hold services at a chapel, albeit sporadically, but would not do so for a time because the inhabitants of Dunzweiler were not prepared to give him “provisions” for the trip. From 1638 to 1832, the Evangelical Christians at first belonged to the parish of Waldmohr and then to the Church of Breitenbach. In 1841, the Evangelical congregation got a new church after the old chapel had been torn down. Catholic Christians were among the newcomers who came to settle in the wake of the Thirty Years' War, and in the beginning likewise attended services in Breitenbach. In 1932, they set up an “emergency church” (Notkirche); a proper church was not built until 1964. This is consecrated to Saint Giles (Ägidius in German).

== Politics ==
=== Municipal council ===
The council is made up of 12 council members, who were elected by proportional representation at the municipal election held on 7 June 2009, and the honorary mayor as chairman.

The municipal election held on 7 June 2009 yielded the following results:

| Year | SPD | CDU | Total |
|---|---|---|---|
| 2009 | 7 | 5 | 12 seats |
| 2004 | 7 | 5 | 12 seats |

Owing to a drop in population, the number of members elected to council was reduced from 16 to 12 in 1984.

=== Mayor ===
Dunzweiler's mayor is Volker Korst (CDU).

=== Coat of arms ===
The municipality's arms might be described thus: Per pale gules a scythe and a flail per saltire surmounted by a wheel spoked of six all Or, and Or a miner's lamp sable flammant and charged with a hammer and pick per saltire of the first.

The scythe and flail refer to agriculture, which in earlier times defined the village's life. The other charge, the miner's lamp, refers to the former collieries in the Dunzweiler area.

=== Town partnerships ===
Dunzweiler fosters partnerships with the following places:

- Monchy-Lagache, Somme, France since 5 October 1985

== Culture and sightseeing ==
=== Buildings ===
The following are listed buildings or sites in Rhineland-Palatinate’s Directory of Cultural Monuments:

- Protestant church, Brunnenstraße 14 – stone block building with Gothic Revival elements, octagonal tower top, 1840/1841

=== Clubs and events ===
Cultural events in Dunzweiler are largely defined by its local clubs, particularly by the Liederkranz singing club’s events, those staged at Shrovetide by the Carnival Club and colourful events staged by both the Catholic and Evangelical women’s associations.

Also to be found in the village are a pensioners’ club, a fruitgrowing and gardening club, a women's gymnastic club, a skiing club, a motorsport club, the Turn- und Sportverein 1930 (“Gymnastic and Sport Club”), the Club der Zwanzig (“Club of the Twenty”), a German Red Cross local chapter, an SPD local chapter and a club for the care of small animals.

Dunzweiler holds a village festival on the first weekend in July, the kermis (church consecration festival) on the first weekend in September and a Nikolausmarkt (“Saint Nicholas’s Market”) on the first Sunday in Advent.

== Economy and infrastructure ==
=== Economic structure ===
Originally, all the village's families worked the land, while in almost every household, looms wove linen, affording farm families further income. A mill was first mentioned in 1550, as was another one in 1575 (called the Hieronymusmühle, and later Dunzweiler Mühle). During the Thirty Years' War, both mills were destroyed, and only the Dunzweiler Mühle rose again sometime around the beginning of the 18th century (thus about 50 years after the war). Right near the mill at that time were the brickworks, which have long since vanished. The mill itself was shut down for good in 1970. Mining gained importance in the course of the 18th century, especially in neighbouring villages, while in Dunzweiler itself, the first mine, the Dietrich Reinhard Colliery, opened only in 1820. A further gallery was dug in 1840, and the colliery remained in business, with interruptions, until after the First World War. Further prospecting led to moderate success. Even after the Second World War, the municipality got permission from the state government to dig a gallery on the Lachrech. Owing to further political and economic developments, this enterprise could not be carried through to completion. Today, Dunzweiler is a community defined mainly by commuters who look to Waldmohr for work.

=== Education ===
During the 17th century, schoolchildren from Dunzweiler attended classes in Waldmohr, and for a short while about the turn of the 18th century they also had a winter school (a school geared towards an agricultural community's practical needs, held in the winter, when farm families had a bit more time to spare) teacher in their own village. In 1722, Hermann Dörr was named as the village schoolteacher. Others named were Friedrich Jakob Lochner in 1743, Georg Zimmermann in 1759, Philipp Wildberger in 1764 and last, before the abolition of the feudal system, was Johann Jacob Hafner. All 19th- and 20th-century village schoolteachers are also documented. The village likely already had a schoolhouse in the 18th century. In 1848, the municipality got a new schoolhouse for both denominations, which was used for classes until 1964. Yet another new schoolhouse was planned at the turn of the 20th century, but the plan was never realized. A new one was built in 1964, but it saw hardly a decade's use, and is now used as a kindergarten. Ever since, primary school pupils and Hauptschule students have been attending their respective programmes at the Rothenfeldschule in Waldmohr (primary school and Regionalschule). Higher schools are found in Homburg. The nearest universities are Saarland University in Saarbrücken (Faculty of Medicine in Homburg) and the Kaiserslautern University of Technology in Kaiserslautern.

=== Transport ===
Dunzweiler is linked to both Waldmohr and Breitenbach by Kreisstraße (District Road) 4, which meets Landesstraße 354 south of the village, which leads to both these neighbouring places. Kreisstraße 4 leads to Schönenberg-Kübelberg in the other direction, while Kreisstraße 71 leads to the neighbouring village of Dittweiler. To the southeast lies an interchange on the Autobahn A 6; interchange 10 lies 8 km away. Serving Homburg is a railway station on the Palatine Ludwig Railway, 12 km away.
