= Breitenbach, Rhineland-Palatinate =

Breitenbach
- Municipality
- Coat of arms

- Location of Breitenbach within Kusel district
- Interactive map of Breitenbach
- Location within Germany Location within Rhineland-Palatinate
- Coordinates: 49°26′01″N 7°16′11″E
- Country: Germany
- State: Rhineland-Palatinate
- District: Kusel
- Municipal assoc.: Oberes Glantal

Government
  - Mayor (2019–24): Johannes Roth

Area
  - Total: 8.89 km^{2} (3.43 sq mi)
- Elevation: 364 m (1,194 ft)

Population (2025-12-31)
  - Total: 1,751
  - Density: 197/km^{2} (510/sq mi)
- Time zone: UTC+01:00 (CET)
  - Summer (DST): UTC+02:00 (CEST)
- Postal codes: 66916
- Dialling codes: 06386
- Vehicle registration: KUS
- Website: breitenbach-pfalz.de

Breitenbach (German pronunciation: [ˈbʁaɪtn̩bax]) is an Ortsgemeinde – a municipality belonging to a Verbandsgemeinde, a kind of collective municipality – in the Kusel district in Rhineland-Palatinate, Germany. It belongs to the Verbandsgemeinde of Oberes Glantal. Breitenbach is one of the Kusel district's eight biggest municipalities. It is also the Palatinate's westernmost municipality.

== Geography ==
=== Location ===
The municipality lies in the Kusel Musikantenland (“Minstrels’ Land”) in the Western Palatinate, on the state boundary with the Saarland. The village stretches over a high hollow some 380 m above sea level, ringed by elevations some of which reach up to 450 m above sea level and with an opening towards the south leading to the neighbouring village of Lautenbach in the Saarland, through which the land falls off to about 350 m above sea level by the time it reaches the boundary. Flowing in this direction, too, is a brook, itself known by the same name as the municipality, the Breitenbach, but it is also known as the Schönbach. The Breitenbach or Schönbach empties within the village of Lautenbach into another brook, this one with the same name as that village, the Lautenbach, which itself flows into the Osterbach. In the municipality's northwest lies the Labach mine, which likewise lies on a brook with the same name, the Labach. This flows into the Oster after only about a kilometre, just north of Dörrenbach. The Labach mine was one of three former coalmines within Breitenbach's municipal limits. Well patronized is the countryside inn that now stands here. Other mines were the Augustusgrube in the north and a gallery in the west on the Dörrenbacher Weg (road). Most of the homesteads named below stretch in an east-west direction north of the village, although the Mühlberghof lies in the southwest and the Bambergerhof and Berghof lie in the southeast. The municipal area measures 889 ha, of which 267 ha is wooded.

=== Neighbouring municipalities ===
Breitenbach borders in the east on the municipalities of Frohnhofen, Altenkirchen and Dittweiler, in the southeast on the municipality of Dunzweiler, in the southwest on the town of Ottweiler and in the northwest on the town of Sankt Wendel. The last two named lie in the Saarland.

=== Constituent communities ===
Also belonging to Breitenbach are the outlying homesteads of Bambergerhof, Berghof, Felsenbrunnerhof, Kahlenbornerhof, Labach (former mine), Langwieserhof, Mühlberghof, Pfalzrechhof, Römerhof and Schönbornerhof, which together have about 150 inhabitants.

=== Municipality’s layout ===
The main road axis in the municipality is the combination of Frohnhofer Straße and Lautenbacher Straße, which run through the village from northeast to southwest. From this axis sprout other roads, leading to neighbouring villages: Altenkircher Straße, Waldmohrer Straße, Fürther Straße. Within this arrangement, the built-up area between Lautenbacher Straße and Waldmohrer Straße forms the older part of the village. Friedhofstraße leads to the Evangelical church in the middle of this village core and to the graveyard on the village's southern outskirts. Branching off this old core, the original 1842 cadastral survey shows two further older areas, one on Fürther Straße and the other on Kirchstraße, which leads to the Catholic church on the village's northern outskirts. Among the older houses are many simple farmhouses, but also Bergmannsbauernhäuser (“miner-farmers’ houses”) with limited farmstead facilities, which served miners who also worked farms part-time. New building areas are laid out mainly in the western and southeastern parts of the village. On the street “Auf dem Wilcher”, parallel to Lautenbacher-Straße, lie the fairgrounds with a multipurpose hall (Schönbachtalhalle) and the primary school. A village community centre stands near the Catholic church on Kirchstraße. The Bergmannsbauernmuseum (“Miner-Farmers’ Museum”) was set up in the former southern primary school at the southern end of Waldmohrer Straße. The sporting ground lies on the village's southwestern outskirts near the Mühlberghof.

== History ==
=== Antiquity ===
Even in prehistoric times, the Breitenbach area was inhabited by man, bearing witness to which are various archaeological finds. Recovered from a barrow as early as 1870 were urns, whose whereabouts today is no longer known. More extensive are finds from Roman times. At the former graveyard at the church, a stone sculpture of a lion holding a hare in his paws was found. This sculpture from Gallo-Roman times is today kept at the Historisches Museum der Pfalz (“Historical Museum of the Palatinate”) in Speyer. In 1898, a farmer discovered on his land “Am Trumpelhaus”, north of Breitenbach, not far from the Labach mine, foundations of a Gallo-Roman villa rustica. A report about the subsequent digs with a plan of the foundations is contained in the communications of the Historischer Verein der Pfalz (“Historical Association of the Palatinate”), “Band 23, Speyer 1899”. Unearthed were the following smaller finds: a bridle, a bell, a short piece of lead pipe, nails and chains, a silver coin and a blue pearl. Even some wall plastering was found. At a hill east of Breitenbach (Heidenkeller), remnants of another villa rustica came to light in 1909, one that had already been mentioned by Tilemann Stella. Digs there by Duke Karl II August in 1790 brought to light a few Roman coins. Even today, this estate still has not been systematically explored. While sinking a shaft at the Labach mine in 1956, workers found remnants of a Roman tomb.

=== Middle Ages ===
When Breitenbach arose as a settlement is not known. According to the first documentary mention in 1303, Henelo, called Mula von Saarbrücken, sold his lord, Count Walram I of Zweibrücken (1269-1309), rights to yearly income from the village of Breidenbach worth 20 pounds in Metz pennies (Pfennige), namely one pig worth 12 shillings (Schillinge), five Viertel of average wine, eight capons and 30 penny loaves (Pfennigbrote). Also according to this document, the village belonged at the turn of the 14th century to the County of Zweibrücken, which arose from the Bliesgau. Walram I was a son of Heinrich II of Zweibrücken (1228-1282), knowledge of whom springs from the history of the County of Veldenz in which he was guardian of the hereditary daughter Agnes von Veldenz and also the builder of several castles within the Remigiusland. In the same year, Mula also sold Walram a further share of his income rights in Breitenbach, this time worth one pound in Metz pennies. It is clear from the document that the income from Breitenbach owed Mula amounted to seven pounds ten shillings in Metz pennies, which had to be raised by the estate manager. It is to be understood that Mula forwent the payments in kind owed him in return for a fee that the count paid. From a 1337 document, the reader learns that Walram II (1312-1366) sold Breitenbach and a few other villages (Dirmingen, Kleinottweiler and Jägersburg) to Jakob Daniels von Trier and Aron von Wittlich, who were both Jews, for a price of 1,700 pounds in Heller. At first, the right to buy them back was reserved for a period of eight years, but later that same year, Walram and his wife Jeneta gave the two buyers approval to sell the villages again, this time to Archbishop Baldwin of Trier. The holding must soon have passed back to the Counts of Zweibrücken, though, for in 1382, Breitenbach was pledged by Count Eberhard of Zweibrücken (1357-1394) together with the village of Lautenbach for 300 Gulden to the related Counts Heinrich and Friedrich of Veldenz. Eberhard surely soon redeemed the two villages, for in 1388, Eberhard II pledged one third of Breitenbach to Anselm Lamperter von Bitsch.

In the early 15th century, as a result of debts, the County of Zweibrücken was pledged, with the Palatinate holding the rights of redemption. Stephen, Count Palatine of Simmern-Zweibrücken, found these rights useful when he married Anna of Veldenz in 1406, daughter of Frederick III, Count of Veldenz, the last count in the younger line of Veldenz. In 1444, after Friedrich's death, Stephan founded a new principality out of the County of Veldenz and the redeemed County of Zweibrücken, which came to be known as the Duchy of Palatine Zweibrücken. Breitenbach now lay within this new state.

=== Modern times ===
Now that Breitenbach belonged to the Duchy of Palatinate-Zweibrücken, the village shared a history with this state, until Palatinate-Zweibrücken met its end when all former feudal states were swept away in the French Revolution. The village first belonged to the Oberamt of Zweibrücken and was the seat of its own Schultheißerei, but then in 1768 passed to the Oberamt of Homburg and the Schultheißerei of Waldmohr. Although Breitenbach lay within Palatinate-Zweibrücken, it also lay right at the border with the Oberamt of Lichtenberg, which lay within the County of Nassau-Saarbrücken. In his 1564 Beschreibung der Ämter Zweibrücken und Kirkel (“Description of the Ämter of Zweibrücken and Kirkel”), Tilemann Stella outlined the path taken by the border, beginning with a Markstein, or “marchstone”, which apparently marked a tripoint. His account is written in very archaic spelling, but is still perfectly intelligible, if a bit dry, dealing mostly with a number of borderstones and the number of paces between each and the next.

In 1570, during Duke Wolfgang's reign, the government in Zweibrücken set forth the so-called Breitenbacher Abschied, a law that laid down measures for the subjects’ rights and duties. It dealt with, among other things, direct taxation rights at Breitenbach, a serf in the village and others at Werschweiler, swine-grazing rights in the woods at Limbach, the use of the Vorbacher Wald (forest) by Limbach's inhabitants and tolls in Mittelbexbach.

The village was struck hard by the events of the Thirty Years' War, not only by the warfare waged then, but also by the Plague. On several occasions it was reported that Breitenbach had been destroyed and that only a few people there had survived the war. Slowly, the village was built up again. In 1675, there were once more nine families living in the village, who then faced further warfare with King Louis XIV's wars of conquest. What can be assumed, though, is that the repopulation efforts were promoted by the French, who saw to it that the newcomers were mainly Catholic. Clearly, many came, for in the late 17th century, the village's population rose fivefold. In 1765, the Bamberger Hof on the road to Waldmohr came into being, at first a small settlement with two houses, but which grew over time into a village within the village, especially once the road was expanded. As a result of the French Revolution, the rule of the Duchy of Palatinate-Zweibrücken came to an end. In 1793, the first French Revolutionary troops showed up. In 1801, France annexed the German lands on the Rhine’s left bank. During the short period of French rule leading up to 1814, Breitenbach lay in the Mairie (“Mayoralty”) of Waldmohr and the Canton of Waldmohr as well as the Arrondissement of Saarbrücken and the Department of Sarre, whose seat was at Trier.

==== Recent times ====
In 1814, the French withdrew from their Rhenish holdings in Germany. After a transitional time, the Baierischer Rheinkreis came into being, later the Bavarian Rhenish Palatinate (bayerische Rheinpfalz) within the Kingdom of Bavaria, to which the Congress of Vienna had awarded the region. The administrative entities that had arisen under the outgoing administration were dissolved. Breitenbach now belonged to the Canton of Waldmohr in the Landkommissariat of Homburg. In 1825, the village passed to the Bürgermeisterei (“Mayoralty”) of Frohnhofen, and in 1849 it became the hub of its own mayoralty, which persisted until administrative restructuring in Rhineland-Palatinate in 1972. After the First World War, the Homburg district was grouped into the autonomous Saar, although the Canton of Waldmohr remained with the newly founded Free State of Bavaria – the last king of Bavaria had abdicated just as the Kaiser had – and thereby within Germany. It belonged, with a branch administrative office, to the Bezirksamt (or Kreis, that is, district) of Kusel, which remained in existence until 1940, when the Waldmohr branch was dissolved and merged into the district of Kusel. Between 1972 and 2017, Breitenbach belonged as an Ortsgemeinde to the Verbandsgemeinde of Waldmohr.

=== Population development ===
Breitenbach was originally purely a farming village, but from the mid 18th century grew bit by bit into a village of industrial workers, helped along by the growth in coal mining. Since the mid 20th century, it has been held to be a residential community for people employed in all kinds of occupations, and who for the most part must commute to work outside the village. Extensive figures are available about Breitenbach's population development, according to which 13 families with some 70 inhabitants lived in the village in the Late Middle Ages. At the onset of the Thirty Years' War there were 30 families with some 150 inhabitants. For a while, nobody was left in Breitenbach, but by 1663, there were once again eight households, with only a slight rise in population by 1675. As a result of the re-population policies during the French occupation during King Louis XIV's wars of conquest, there was a sharp rise in population in the late 17th century, in which within only a few decades, the number of inhabitants rose sixfold. Among the newcomers in this time were a great many Catholics, whereas before the Thirty Years' War, only Protestants were allowed to settle in the village. Today, about as many Protestants as Catholics live in Breitenbach. Through until the latter half of the 20th century, there was a steady rise in population, peaking at 2,161 in 1965. Thereafter followed a slight drop and stagnation.

The following table shows population development over the centuries for Breitenbach, with some figures broken down by religious denomination:

Year	1630	1675	1700	1825	1835	1871	1905	1939	1961	1963
Total	150	40	200	785	925	826	1,177	1,428	2,039	2,161
Catholic					226					985
Evangelical					559					1,038
Other					–					16

=== Municipality’s name ===
The municipality's name refers to the land itself on which the village lies, a village that arose on a rather broad dale through which ran a brook (the name “Breitenbach” means “broad brook”). The village's name first appears as Breidenbach in a 1303 document from the County of Zweibrücken. Other names that the village has borne over the ages are Breydenbach (1326, 1337, 1410), Braidenbach (1547), Breittenbach (1564) and Braidenbach (1587). The now current spelling first cropped up in 1601.

=== Vanished villages ===
A place called Bickenbach, mentioned as early as 1249, supposedly once lay near Breitenbach. The spelling used for “Breitenbach” in that document, however, was Breidenbach, and it could be that the document in question refers to Breidenbach in Moselle (Lorraine), France, not far south of Hornbach.

== Religion ==
The parish of Breitenbach might well be very old, and it is not known from documents when it first came into being. The village was likely a parish seat before its first documentary mention, and as such it would have belonged to the Glan chapter. The Evangelical church standing today bears in its oldest parts the mark of the Romanesque style, and may thus date from the early 12th century. There might also have been a forerunner church. The church is mentioned in a 1326 document, according to which Agnes von Zweibrücken transferred the patronage rights over the church of Breitenbach to the “Repenters” (Reuerinnen; an order of nuns dedicated to Saint Mary Magdalene) at Zweibrücken. According to this deed, the nuns of that convent were allowed to put forward, bindingly, the priest who was to be posted to the church. A further mention comes through the handbook of the Bishopric of Speyer. According to that, Breitenbach was a Catholic parish in 1462 and belonged to the deaconry of Altenglan and the Archdiocese of Mainz. By the principle of cuius regio, eius religio, all the village's Christians had to adapt first to the Reformation according to Martin Luther, and then later, in 1688 under Duke Johannes I to Reformed belief according to John Calvin (Calvinism).

In 1546, the pastor and the “church jurymen” (actually parochial assistants) at Breitenbach yielded their land servitude and income sources at Dunzweiler, which they had bought from Gentersberg and for which their church no longer had any use, for a yearly benefit of five Gulden, in perpetuity, to Duke Wolfgang and his heirs. The Peace of Westphalia, a series of peace treaties signed between May and October 1648 in Osnabrück and Münster, which brought the Thirty Years' War to an end, guaranteed the free practice of religion, and in the late 17th century, this law was also operative in Breitenbach, where it is likely that once again Lutherans, and certain that Catholics were among the newcomers who came to settle in the village. For a time, the various denominations within the duchy were being promoted at the same time by three authorities, Calvinism by Friederike Charlotte, who had then taken over the governmental dealings, Lutheranism by the Swedes, whose kings never laid eyes on their Zweibrücken holdings, and Catholicism by the French occupational forces. If it seemed an unlikely thing to happen that many newcomers settled in Breitenbach and also that a Catholic parish was once again founded in 1687, then without a doubt, these events could be traced back to French initiatives. Forthwith, French names began cropping up in the Catholic church books, as if to underscore this development. After 1687, the church was held by a simultaneum, and both Protestant and Catholic services were held there. This old church was thoroughly renovated in the Baroque style between 1783 and 1787 to plans by Zweibrücken master builder Friedrich Wahl, whose work preserved, at least fundamentally, the quire tower. The Catholic parish, to which for a time the Catholics of Höchen, Fürth im Ostertal, Dörrenbach, Dunzweiler and Lautenbach also belonged, built its own church about the turn of the 20th century in the Gothic Revival style. The simultaneum thereby came to an end, and the mediaeval church once more served only the Protestants. Today, the Evangelical parish of Breitenbach with a branch at Höchen belongs to the Evangelical deaconry of Homburg of the Pfälzische Landeskirche (“Palatine State Church”), and the Catholic parish of Breitenbach belongs to the Catholic deaconry of Homburg of the Diocese of Trier.

== Politics ==
=== Municipal council ===
The council is made up of 16 council members, who were elected by proportional representation at the municipal election held on 7 June 2009, and the honorary mayor as chairman.

The municipal election held on 7 June 2009 yielded the following results:

Year	SPD	CDU	WG 1	WG 2	Total
2004	9	5	2	–	16 seats
2009	7	3	3	3	16 seats

The “WGs” are voters’ groups.

=== Mayors ===
On 26 May 2019, Johannes Roth was elected mayor. He succeeded Jürgen Knapp, former mayor Daniel Knapp's great-grandson, who was in office from 2011 until 2019.

Listed below are former mayors of Breitenbach and their times in office:

- 1849–1855: Daniel Morgenstern
- 1855–1867: Jakob Morgenstern
- 1867–1882: Michael Hanauer
- 1882–1889: Christian Gabes
- 1889–1905: Jakob Staudt
- 1905–1910: Karl Schleppi
- 1910–1920: Daniel Knapp
- 1920–1928: Ludwig Göttel
- 1928–1933: Christian Schneider
- 1933–1936: Albert Hartmann
- 1936–1945: Richard Rech
- 1945–1946: Arnold Dresch
- 1946–1957: Alfred Hüther
- 1957–1969: Hermann Bäumchen
- 1969–1976: Gunther Trautmann
- 1976–1988: Willibald Weyrich
- 1988–1990: Hans Ambos
- 1990–1994: Hans Ellmer
- 1994–2004: Werner Rimkus
- 2004–2011: Wolfgang Steigner-Wild
- 2011–2019: Jürgen Knapp
- 2019–: Johannes Roth

=== Coat of arms ===
The municipality's arms might be described thus: A bend sinister wavy argent between Or a lion rampant issuant from the bend sinister gules armed and langued azure, and sable an ear of wheat couped in base and embowed to bendwise sinister of the second.

The “bend sinister wavy argent” (that is, broad silver slanted stripe) is canting for the village's name, symbolizing as it does a broad brook (the literal meaning of “Breitenbach”). The charge above this is the Zweibrücken lion, a reference to the village's former allegiance to that state. On the other side of the bend sinister wavy is an ear of grain representing agriculture, and the field tincture on this side, sable (black), recalls the coalmining that was once common in Breitenbach. The arms have been borne since 1966 when they were approved by the now defunct Regierungsbezirk administration in Neustadt an der Weinstraße.

== Culture and sightseeing ==
=== Buildings ===
The following are listed buildings or sites in Rhineland-Palatinate’s Directory of Cultural Monuments:

- Saint James’s Catholic Parish Church (Pfarrkirche St. Jakob), Kirchstraße 14 – Gothic Revival sandstone-block building, flanking quire tower, 1898–1900/1904, architect Wilhelm Schulte I, Neustadt an der Weinstraße
- Protestant parish church, Friedhofstraße 5 – quire tower from the 13th or 14th century, Late Baroque aisleless church, 1783–1787, architect Friedrich Gerhard Wahl, Zweibrücken; Roman spolia
- Kirchstraße 12 – Catholic rectory; block building with gable risalto, Gothic Revival motifs, marked 1899
- Waldmohrer Straße 13 – Protestant rectory; Classicist building with hipped roof, marked 1824

The old north schoolhouse (“Schulhaus Nord”), which had long ceased to be a school even before its south counterpart, was given over to two new purposes. The older part of the building became the municipal centre, where the mayor's office and the municipal council chamber can now be found. A later addition to the school now houses the municipal kindergarten.

=== Museums ===
Breitenbach is home to a Bergmannsbauernmuseum, a Bergmannsbauer being a miner who also tends a farm. On display at this nationally significant museum are the work and the life around the coalmines, as it was in the Saar-Palatinate region. The museum was assembled with help from the Christian Scouts, with particular thanks going to troop elder and museum curator Günter Schneider's fervour for collecting. The museum is housed in the old south schoolhouse (“Schulhaus Süd”), which until 1990 served as a primary school (this has now been moved to a new building).

=== Clubs ===
Breitenbach has the following clubs and leisure opportunities for youth:

- Bergknappenverein — miners’ club
- Carnevalsverein — Carnival (Shrovetide) club
- CDU-Ortsverband — Christian Democratic Union of Germany local association
- Christliche Pfadfinder — Christian scouts (“Albert Schweitzer” troop)
- DRK-Ortsverein — German Red Cross local association
- Evangelischer Kirchenchor — Evangelical church choir
- Freiwillige Feuerwehr — Volunteer fire brigade with a promotional association and a youth wing
- Gesangverein Bruderherz — singing club
- Gesangverein Eintracht — singing club
- Kaninchenzuchtverein — rabbit-raising club
- Katholischer Kirchenchor — Catholic church choir
- Landfrauenverein — Countrywomen's Club
- Musikverein Harmonie — music club
- Obst- und Gartenbauverein — fruitgrowing and gardening club
- Pensionärverein — pensioners’ club
- Schützenverein — “Diana” marksmen's club
- SPD-Ortsverein — Social Democratic Party of Germany local association
- Tischtennisverein — table tennis club
- Turn- und Sportverein — gymnastic and sport club

A large group comprising members of various clubs took part in the so-called 72-Stunden-Aktion (“72-Hour Action”) from which arose the renovation of the Verschönerungspfad (“Beautification Path”)

There is also a youth meeting centre.

=== Regular events ===
Breitenbach holds its kermis (church consecration festival) on the last weekend in September.

=== Media ===
News coverage of Breitenbach can be found in the Westricher Rundschau, a local edition of Die Rheinpfalz, a daily newspaper.

Irregularly, the Grünspecht voters’ group publishes its so-called Dorfzeitung (“Village Newspaper”), which reports municipal council's work and other, exclusively village-related topics.

Public announcements and summarized news reports from the village can be found in the Südkreis (“South District”) edition of the Wochenblatt, a weekly publication financed wholly through advertising.

In 2005, a village chronicle was published, both in print and on the Internet.

== Economy and infrastructure ==
=== Economic structure ===
Originally, the village's main economic focus was on agriculture, and indeed, there are still today a number of big agricultural operations here. In 1738 coal prospecting near the village was first mentioned. For thirty years, the mine was owned by either private citizens or a mining union, until in 1788 it was bought up by the Duke of Palatinate-Zweibrücken. In 1786, the Breitenbach coalfields already boasted six collieries. The coal was marketed in the Oberamt of Lichtenberg, where several other places were also drawn to the work. The ducal mine, though, was hardly profitable, particularly because of competition from the coalmines near Altenkirchen.

Nevertheless, mining in Breitenbach experienced a revival as bit by bit, eight new galleries were dug. The most important of these was the Labach gallery, which was worked the longest. It employed miners from Breitenbach itself and the surrounding area. Before the First World War there was also a dormitory for workers from far afield. In the First World War, the mine could no longer stand up to competition and was shut down. In 1922 and also after the Second World War, each time for a short while, it was open again. Ever since, Breitenbach has been a residential community for people in the most varied of occupations, most of whom must commute to work elsewhere. In Breitenbach itself are quite a few businesses and shops, ensuring that basic supplies are available to the villagers on the spot. Breitenbach has a supermarket, a druggist's (Drogeriemarkt), a pharmacy (Apotheke), several hairdresser's shops, two bank branches, a butcher’s shop, several restaurants/taverns, a carpentry shop, an eyeglass shop, an automotive spare parts dealership, several auto mechanics and one physiotherapist with a fitness studio.

Since 2008, a work group has been undertaking to make Breitenbach more attractive, both in the sense of beautification and in the sense of a broader range of offerings.

In 2009 and 2010, the Europäischer Bauernmarkt (“European Farmer’s Market”) was held in Breitenbach, drawing roughly 50,000 visitors each time, making it the biggest event held in the village to this day.

=== Education ===
Schooling in Breitenbach began quite early on, as early as the late 16th century. Parents were asked by an ecclesiastical visitation in 1556 to send their children to Kinderlehre (“children’s teaching”). A “school server” (teacher) whose name is unknown taught until 1602. The next teacher came from nearby Niederkirchen, where he had neglected his office, and at his new job he sought to improve the payments to him in kind, as beyond teaching, he knew no other craft. For the time that followed, no records are available, caught as the whole countryside was in the throes of the Thirty Years' War. In 1672 – twenty-four years after the war ended – the local pastor put forth Jakob Lauer from Breitenbach as the new schoolteacher. It seems likely that he was not hired, as the municipality would not comply with Lauer's wage demands, and the general opinion anyway was that hiring a teacher for a mere five schoolchildren was a bit excessive. Only since 1730 is every schoolteacher's name known without any gaps. The schoolhouse at that time was thoroughly renovated in 1763. From 1749 to 1786, the teacher was Friedrich Rind from Kusel who, besides teaching, “practised no trade”. He was followed by his son Friedrich Rind, who hired an assistant, Jakob Morgenstern, in 1792, paying him room and board, and also demanding 12 Malter of grain to which he felt he was entitled.

Today, there is still a primary school at the fairgrounds. Hauptschule students, on the other hand, must attend their schools in Waldmohr. Higher schools are to be found in Ottweiler and Homburg. The nearest universities are Saarland University in Saarbrücken (Faculty of Medicine in Homburg) and the Kaiserslautern University of Technology in Kaiserslautern.

=== Transport ===
Breitenbach lies on Landesstraße 354 (Frohnhofen–Waldmohr), branching from which within the village itself is Landesstraße 335, leading to the state boundary at the neighbouring village of Lautenbach. A few kilometres beyond is Bundesstraße 420 near Fürth in the Saarland. Kreisstraße (District Road) 5 provides a direct link to the neighbouring village of Altenkirchen. To the southeast runs the Autobahn A 6 (the nearest interchange is no. 10 near the Waldmohr service centre, roughly 10 km away), and to the northeast runs the A 62 (Kaiserslautern–Trier).

Serving Homburg is a railway station on the Pfälzische Ludwigsbahn (Palatine Ludwig Railway). Serving Sankt Wendel and Ottweiler, each roughly 10 km away, are stations on the Nahetalbahn (Nahe Valley Railway).
