= Lachrymatory =

Lachrymatory or lacrymatory may refer to:

- Something that has the effect of lachrymation, causing the secretion of tears
- Tear gas, known formally as a lachrymatory agent or lachrymator
- A lacrymatory, a small vessel of terracotta or glass found in Roman and late Greek tombs, once thought to have been used to collect the tears of mourners at funerals
