= Waldmohr (Verbandsgemeinde) =

Former Verbandsgemeinde in Rhineland-Palatinate

Coordinates: 49°23′43″N 7°20′28″E

Waldmohr is a former Verbandsgemeinde ("collective municipality") in the district of Kusel, Rhineland-Palatinate, Germany. On 1 January 2017 it merged into the new Verbandsgemeinde Oberes Glantal. The seat of the Verbandsgemeinde was in Waldmohr.

The Verbandsgemeinde Waldmohr consisted of the following Ortsgemeinden ("local municipalities"):

- Breitenbach
- Dunzweiler
- Waldmohr
