= Schönenberg-Kübelberg =

- Municipality
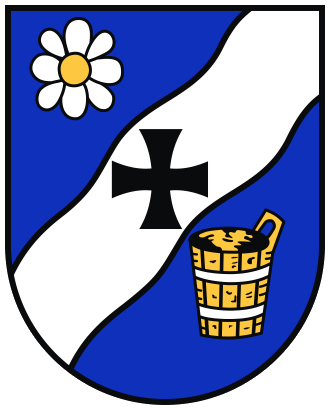
- Coat of arms

- Location of Schönenberg-Kübelberg within Kusel district
- Interactive map of Schönenberg-Kübelberg
- Location within Germany Location within Rhineland-Palatinate
- Coordinates: 49°24′38″N 7°22′36″E
- Country: Germany
- State: Rhineland-Palatinate
- District: Kusel
- Municipal assoc.: Oberes Glantal

Government
  - Mayor (2019–24): Thomas Wolf

Area
  - Total: 18.68 km^{2} (7.21 sq mi)
- Elevation: 250 m (820 ft)

Population (2025-12-31)
  - Total: 5,663
  - Density: 303.2/km^{2} (785.2/sq mi)
- Time zone: UTC+01:00 (CET)
  - Summer (DST): UTC+02:00 (CEST)
- Postal codes: 66901
- Dialling codes: 06373
- Vehicle registration: KUS
- Website: www.schoenenberg-kuebelberg.de

Schönenberg-Kübelberg is an Ortsgemeinde – a municipality belonging to a Verbandsgemeinde, a kind of collective municipality – in the Kusel district in Rhineland-Palatinate, Germany. It belongs to the Verbandsgemeinde Oberes Glantal, and is its seat. The municipality was formed on 7 June 1969 in the course of administrative restructuring in Rhineland-Palatinate out of the former municipalities and outlying centres of Schönenberg, Kübelberg, Schmittweiler and Sand. The centres have melded together since then and now stand as an economic hub for the southern Kusel district. By population, Schönenberg-Kübelberg is the Kusel district's biggest municipality. It is also a state-recognized tourism community.

== Geography ==
=== Location ===
The municipality of Schönenberg-Kübelberg lies in the Western Palatinate near the boundary with the Saarland some 15 km south of Kusel, and 10 km northeast of Homburg. The two Ortsteile lie at the edge of the Landstuhler Bruch (a hollow). Kübelberg on the long mountain ridge south of the Klingbach runs seamlessly into Schönenberg to the east, while Schönenberg also melds without a break with the outlying centre of Sand. Within the municipality, the land rises from 241 m above sea level at the edge of the brook up to 264 m near the church in Kübelberg. Outside the built-up area, the highest elevations in the municipal area reach some 300 m above sea level in the Steinwald and Peterswald (forests).

=== Neighbouring municipalities ===
Schönenberg-Kübelberg borders in the north on the municipality of Brücken, in the northeast on the municipality of Gries, in the east on the municipality of Bruchmühlbach-Miesau, in the south on the municipality of Waldmohr, in the west on the municipality of Dunzweiler and in the northwest on the municipality of Dittweiler.

=== Constituent communities ===
Schönenberg-Kübelberg's Ortsteile are Schönenberg, Kübelberg, Schmittweiler and Sand. Also belonging to Schönenberg-Kübelberg are the outlying homesteads of Heidhof, Elmerthof and Klingenmühle.

=== Municipality’s layout ===
In each of the two biggest centres, the old village core can still be made out today. For Kübelberg this lies in the area of the Catholic church, west of Bundesstraße 423, and for Schönenberg east of this thoroughfare on the road branching off towards Sand. South of this road stand the village hall, which houses both the municipal and Verbandsgemeinde administration, and the Evangelical church. What were once two linear villages (by some definitions, "thorpes") have grown together, along with the outlying centre of Sand, and have also spread in every direction, southwards, particularly to the railway line, in the east end also over the railway. The central school building with a Realschule and a Hauptschule stands north of the village in the Kohlbach valley. The primary school, which is still used today, stands on Pestalozzistraße (named after an educator, Johann Heinrich Pestalozzi) in Kübelberg. Near the railway line south of Schönenberg spreads a major sporting facility.

== History ==
=== Antiquity ===
By prehistoric times, the area that is now Schönenberg-Kübelberg was already settled, as witnessed by archaeological finds within the municipal area and in neighbouring ones. A heavily damaged stone axe was found within municipal limits, and is now kept at Speyer. Several groups of barrows dating from the Iron Age are to be found in the Peterswald, south of the village. Noteworthy are two finds that were unearthed and described as early as the 19th century, a fibula and a bronze armring. Actual Roman finds have not been found within Schönenberg-Kübelberg's municipal limits, but quite a few artefacts have been unearthed in the surrounding area.

=== Middle Ages ===
In 956, Kübelberg had its first documentary mention as Cheuilunbahc, while Schönenberg had its first documentary mention in 1419. All the centres that today make up Schönenberg-Kübelberg once lay within the (originally free) Imperial Domain (Reichsland) around the Castle Lautern, which during the 10th century was for a while held by the Bishopric of Worms. It is, however, unclear whether all these centres had already arisen at the time when this area held the status of Imperial Domain. It is certain that the Amt seat was there, namely Kübelberg, and the village of Sand was there, too. Kübelberg lay next to a castle that served as the seat of an Amt within the Imperial Domain. It is likely that this castle vanished before the Middle Ages were over. In some houses on Schmittweiler Straße in Kübelberg, sparse remnants of the castle can still be made out. In the 13th century the castle belonged to the ring of fortifications in the broad area surrounding Castle Kaiserslautern. The area, now known as the Court of Kübelberg (Gericht Kübelberg), was repeatedly pledged by the Empire beginning in 1312 to various lordships, lastly to the Counts of Sponheim, under whose lordship it passed to Electoral Palatinate in 1437, which itself had already taken over the Amt of Kaiserslautern as an Imperial pledge as early as 1375. The Court of Kübelberg thus now belonged within the Electoral Palatinate to the Oberamt of Kaiserslautern. The village of Schönenberg shared this turn of events within the Amt (or Court) of Kübelberg, although there may have been the odd divergence; these, however, are not always verifiable. For instance, after the first documentary mention in 1419, the Junker of Breidenborn, as lords of the neighbouring Amt of Münchweiler, counted the Schultheiß Heinecze von Schonenberg among their subjects. In a further Breidenbach document from the 15th century, other names of inhabitants of Schönenberg were mentioned. Schönenberg must therefore have belonged, at least for a time, to the Amt of Münchweiler, and must thus also have been held by the Hornbach Monastery. A 1456 Weistum (cognate with English wisdom, this was a legal pronouncement issued by men learned in law in the Middle Ages and early modern times) from the Court of Kübelberg has been preserved as a faithful copy.

=== Modern times ===
A further preserved Weistum comes from the year 1554. Even in the description of the Ämter of Zweibrücken and Kirkel by Tilemann Stella, a Renaissance-era academic, Kübelberg is mentioned, as Kibelnberg. In 1600, the Electoral Palatinate forest superintendent Velmann described the whole area of the Court of Kübelberg, also mentioning subjects’ names in his writing, which began with a description of Schönenberg's municipal area. All the municipal area's particularities were noted, including the five ponds, which all belonged to the subjects. Following this was a description of Kübelberg's municipal area, noting its three ponds, although these ones belonged to the "heirs". During the Thirty Years' War, the villages of the Amt of Kübelberg, too, suffered serious hardship and misery. In 1635, during the siege of the Amt town of Kaiserslautern, Imperial troops, in many cases Croats, marched through the land, plundering, robbing and murdering. The villagers fled into the woods or sought shelter in small towns that belonged to Electoral Palatinate, like Wolfstein. The land was depopulated both by war and by the Plague. According to local historian Ernst Christmann, a whole swath of land including the villages of Kübelberg, Schönenberg, Sand, Elschbach and Schmittweiler lay for decades desolate. Slowly, the population figures built themselves back up with villagers who had been driven out returning to their homes, and also with others migrating to the area, although French King Louis XIV's wars brought the people further havoc. Only with the Treaty of Ryswick, which put an end to the Nine Years' War (known in Germany as the Pfälzischer Erbfolgekrieg, or War of the Palatine Succession), did a lasting peace set in. French migrants may well have been arriving even during the wars with the French, but at this time, it was mainly migrants from Switzerland. The population grew so quickly that emigration, mostly to the Americas, began to grow, too. In 1744, Schönenberg once again got a market, after the former Kübelberg Market had been put to an end by the Thirty Years' War. In 1779, a territorial swap resulted in a new political arrangement when Electoral Palatinate agreed to exchange its Amt of Kübelberg with twelve villages (Kübelberg, Schönenberg, Sand, Brücken, Ohmbach, Schmittweiler, Dittweiler, Frohnhofen, Altenkirchen, Ober-Miesau, Nieder-Miesau and Elschbach) and six mills for the villages of Duchroth and Oberhausen and part of the village of Niederkirchen in the Odenbach valley, all of which had hitherto belonged to the Dukes of Palatine Zweibrücken. From this time there also survives a description of the villages in the Amt. The short Zweibrücken interlude lasted until the outbreak of the French Revolution, during which the Amt of Kübelberg was transferred from the Oberamt of Kaiserslautern into the Oberamt of Homburg. The duke who ruled at that time, Charles II August, who had had himself a fairytale castle built in Homburg, was said to be the very model of a princely despot. He awarded himself the title "Admiral" and had a ship built – on the Neuwoog (a pond) in the Peterswald, now part of Schönenberg-Kübelberg. After little time, this ship ran aground and rotted. The Duke also forbade his subjects the use of the Peterswald so that he could use it as his hunting ground. For their part, the subjects registered their displeasure at this by chasing away any lordly lumberjacks that they found.

==== Recent times ====
The first French Revolutionary troops showed up in the area in 1793. France annexed the Rhine’s left bank in 1801. Schönenberg became the seat of a mairie ("mayoralty") to which also belonged the villages of Brücken, Gries, Kübelberg, Sand and Schmittweiler. Schönenberg and Kübelberg both lay in the Canton of Waldmohr in the Arrondissement of Saarbrücken and the Department of Sarre. In 1814, the French withdrew from the Rhine's left bank. After a transitional period, the Bavarian Rheinkreis – an exclave of the Kingdom of Bavaria – was founded in 1816. This was later called the Rheinpfalz ("Rhenish Palatinate"). The administrative entities that had come into being during French Revolutionary and later Napoleonic times were retained and Schönenberg became the seat of a Bürgermeisterei ("mayoralty") in the Canton of Waldmohr in the Landkommissariat of Homburg, although the seat actually shifted from place to place over the next century, according to where the mayor lived. After the First World War, the victorious powers grouped the Bezirksamt of Homburg into the autonomous Saar area, but not the Canton of Waldmohr, to which Schönenberg and Kübelberg both belonged. This stayed with the newly formed Free State of Bavaria – the Kaiser had been overthrown and so had the Bavarian king – and thereby with Weimar Germany. The canton belonged to the Bezirksamt of Kusel with an administrative branch of its own, which it retained until 1940, whereafter the Canton of Waldmohr was administered directly from Kusel. In 1969, Schönenberg, Kübelberg, Sand and Schmittweiler merged to form a new municipality with the name Schönenberg-Kübelberg. In the course of administrative restructuring in Rhineland-Palatinate, Schönenberg-Kübelberg became the seat of a Verbandsgemeinde in 1971.

=== Population development ===
In both villages, Schönenberg and Kübelberg, the villagers originally earned their livelihoods mainly at agriculture, although alongside farmers there were also craftsmen and peat cutters. From the 19th century onwards, a general shift began in which farming fed ever fewer people directly and many farmers’ sons sought work in industry. Unlike many other villages, which offered only a few job opportunities, Schönenberg-Kübelberg today has developed considerable industry of its own. Nevertheless, many members of the workforce must commute elsewhere, to industrial works in Kaiserslautern and mines in the Saarland, or to smaller centres such as Landstuhl or Homburg. After the Second World War, many jobs arose in connection with the stationing of United States Armed Forces at Ramstein Air Base and the Miesau Army Depot. This development brought about a sharp rise in the population. With respect to religion, among Schönenberg's and Kübelberg's mainly Christian inhabitants, roughly 60% are Catholic and the other 40% Evangelical, with the Catholic share of the population having grown slightly over the last two centuries. There was once also a small Jewish community, but their share of the population was not very great. As a result of foreign families and asylum seekers settling in the municipality, a considerable Muslim community has sprung up. As early as 2000, some 16% of the population did not belong to any of the mainstream Christian denominations.

The following tables show population development over the centuries for both Schönenberg and Kübelberg up to 1961, and then for the merged municipality of Schönenberg-Kübelberg:

==== Schönenberg ====
Year	1592	1684	1825	1835	1871	1905	1939	1961
Total	70	5	529	628	601	779	1,221	1,815
Catholic	–		194					726
Evangelical	70		335					1,070

==== Kübelberg ====
Year	1592	1684	1825	1835	1871	1905	1939	1961
Total	75	0	460	544	532	692	1,103	1,412
Catholic	–		337					1,196
Evangelical	75		83					214

==== Schönenberg-Kübelberg ====
Year	1961	1987	2007
Total	3,227	4,085	5,752
Catholic	1,922
Evangelical	1,284
Other	21

=== Municipality’s name ===
Schönenberg first appeared in a document in 1419 as Schonenberg, and Kübelberg first appeared in a document in 956 as Cheuilunbahc. Other names that the two centres have borne are as follows:

- For Schönenberg: Schollemberg and Schowemberg (1737), Schönberg (1564), Schönnbergk (1592), Schönenberg (1797)
- For Kübelberg: Kebelinbach (1018), Keyfelberch (1263), Kebelinburg (1291), Kobelnberg (1291), in castro Keulnberg (1297), Kebelinberg (1304), Kebelnberg (1305 and 1310)

The meaning of the name Schönenberg is not hard to discern. It comes from the German words schön ("lovely") and Berg ("mountain"), and thus it means a settlement at a lovely mountain. The meaning of the name Kübelberg, on the other hand, is not quite as transparent. Although it literally means "tub mountain" (which explains the canting charge in the civic coat of arms), writers Dolch and Greule think that the name may be linked to the old German waterway name Cheuilun. Furthermore, in the Ortsteil of Kübelberg once stood a mediaeval motte-and-bailey castle, the Burg Kübelberg, and it is believed that this caused a shift in the placename ending from —bach to —berg. The first part of Kübelberg's name changed steadily over time before settling on its current form about 1600.

=== Vanished villages ===
Mentioned in the historical record is a place named Wunnenberg, at which it is likely another castle stood. This was known as Wonnenberg, Wonnenburg, Winnenberg or Winnenburg. The actual 1358 document mentioning it says "Wunnenberg, gelegen bei Keblinberg" ("Wunnenberg, lying near Keblinberg"). A certain correspondence in meaning can be seen between schön ("lovely") and Wonne ("blissfulness" or "delight"). It may well therefore be that this Wunnenberg and Schönenberg were one and the same. There was also a place in the Peterswald that could be regarded as the seed that gave rise to today's Schönenberg-Kübelberg. It was called Neunkirchen, and it was mentioned in a document as early as 937 as a donation to the Bishopric of Worms. It was then mentioned several times in the 10th century, and again in the 15th century, before cropping up in a 16th-century record as an abandoned estate in the Peterswald.

== Religion ==
As mentioned above, in 937, even before Kübelberg's first documentary mention, the now vanished village of Neunkirchen (then called Niunchiricha), which lay right near today's Schönenberg-Kübelberg, appeared in the historical record as a donation to the Bishopric of Worms, perhaps as a country church outside any built-up area. It cannot be ruled out that this church was already consecrated to Saint Valentine. During the Middle Ages, Kübelberg was not only the seat of an Amt and a court, but also the hub of a parish whose boundaries changed over time. By no means was the parish coextensive with the court region. The Reformation came to both Schönenberg and Kübelberg, and on the basis of the traditional rule of cuius regio, eius religio, all inhabitants of Electoral Palatinate were obliged to convert to the new belief. In the Reformation's early years, both Lutheranism and the Reformed church were trying to become the predominant belief; in the end, the latter gained the upper hand locally. Any ecclesiastical victory between Protestant denominations, however, was quite moot, for the two villages mostly died out in the Thirty Years' War, and the church in Kübelberg was destroyed. Thereafter, what predominated was religious freedom, and believers from any Christian denomination were welcome to settle in the villages. The pattern of postwar settlement, though, was not the same in both villages: more Protestants settled in Schönenberg, whereas more Catholics settled in Kübelberg. During King Louis XIV's wars in the Palatinate, the French also promoted the settlement of Catholics, and in general, during the 18th century, the Electors of the Palatinate ever more strongly advocated in favour of Catholicism. The results can still be seen today with about 60% of the two villages’ combined population being Catholic and the other 40% being Evangelical. Saint Valentine's Church (Kirche St. Valentin) in Kübelberg goes back to a mediaeval building, parts of whose tower are still preserved. In 1702, the new Catholic church was built with support from the Order of Malta, who then held rights in Kübelberg. The new church was attended by all Catholics living in the surrounding area. It was repeatedly remodelled and acquired a new organ in 1841 built by the Stumm organ-building family. In 1963, the church was extensively expanded, whereby the old nave became the chancel, and on the south side, a great, modern hall church arose. The Evangelical Christians at first had no central church. The Reformed community was bigger, and they attended church services in Miesau. The Lutherans had a small church in Brücken at their disposal. After the unification of the Reformed and Lutheran faiths in the Palatine Union of 1818, the Evangelical Christians from Kübelberg orientated themselves towards Waldmohr, while the ones from Schönenberg stayed with the parish of Miesau. Only in 1954 was the parish of Schönenberg, which still exists now, established, and to this belong the villages of Kübelberg, Sand and Schmittweiler (the whole municipality, in other words). Schönenberg has had an Evangelical church since 1935, which at first was a converted tollhouse. The Evangelical church that stands in Kübelberg was built in 1971 and acquired a belltower in 1986. Today, the Catholics in both the municipality's main centres belong to the Catholic deaconry of Homburg and the Evangelicals belong to the Evangelical deaconry of Homburg.

== Politics ==
=== Municipal council ===
The council is made up of 22 council members, who were elected by proportional representation at the municipal election held on 7 June 2009, and the honorary mayor as chairman.

The municipal election held on 7 June 2009 yielded the following results:

Year	SPD	CDU	GRÜNE	FWG	Total
2009	7	12	1	2	22 seats
2004	7	12	–	3	22 seats

"FWG" is a voters’ group.

=== Mayor ===
Schönenberg-Kübelberg's mayor is Thomas Wolf (CDU).

=== Coat of arms ===
The municipality's arms might be described thus: Azure a bend sinister wavy argent charged with a cross pattée in pale sable, in dexter chief a daisy proper and in sinister base a tub, handle to sinister, Or hooped of the second.

The bend sinister wavy (slanted wavy stripe) refers to the municipality's wealth of water at the edge of the Landstuhler Bruch. The daisy stands for Schönenberg and the tub (Kübel in German, thus making this a canting charge) stands for Kübelberg. The arms have been borne since 1975 when they were approved by the Regierungsbezirk administration. Before this time, Schönenberg and Kübelberg each bore their own arms. Schönenberg's were azure three tubs one and two, handles to dexter argent hooped Or (a reference to the Court of Kübelberg), while Kübelberg's were gules a pile throughout between two tubs Or and charged with a wall and a tower embattled of the same masoned sable on a field lozengy argent and azure. Before amalgamation, the centres of Sand and Schmittweiler bore no arms.

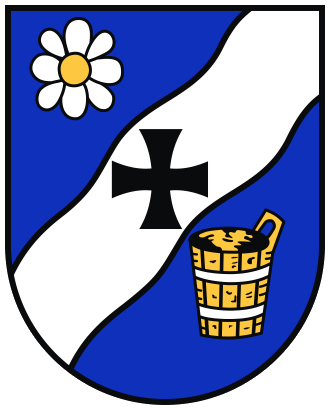
Municipality's current arms

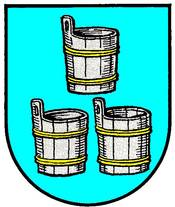
Schönenberg's old arms

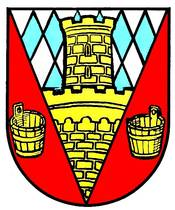
Kübelberg's old arms

=== Town partnerships ===
Schönenberg-Kübelberg fosters partnerships with the following places:

- Szabadszállás, Bács-Kiskun County, Hungary

== Culture and sightseeing ==
=== Buildings ===
The following are listed buildings or sites in Rhineland-Palatinate’s Directory of Cultural Monuments:

==== Kübelberg ====
- Saint Valentine’s Catholic Parish Church (Pfarrkirche St. Valentinus), Kirchengasse 5 – Baroque aisleless church, 1702–1709, marked 1790, tower raised 1826; Stumm organ from 1841, expansion-conversion 1963
- Kirchengasse 1–6 (monumental zone) – distinctive village square appearance around the Catholic church with the former Catholic schoolhouse (no. 3), the former nurses’ residence (no. 4), rectory (no. 6), wayside cross and a small Quereinhaus (a combination residential and commercial house divided for these two purposes down the middle, perpendicularly to the street; no. 1)
- Near Saarbrücker Straße 71 – warriors’ memorial 1914-1918 and 1939-1945, 1935 by Richard Menges, Kaiserslautern, expansion 1956

==== Sand ====
- Miesauer Straße 39 – one-floor Quereinhaus with knee wall, 1898, in the righthand corner stable and shed

==== Schmittweiler ====
- Höcherbergstraße 2 – former school; sandstone-framed plastered building, 1879 architect possibly Regional Building Director (Bezirksbauschaffner) Rottmüller, Homburg; characterizes village's appearance
- Höcherbergstraße 5 – Quereinhaus, dwelling wing with knee wall about 1780, commercial wing, partly timber-frame, between 1806 and 1842
- Lindenstraße 2 – stately Quereinhaus, marked 1844, in the righthand corner a pigsty; characterizes village's appearance
- Lindenstraße 16 – Quereinhaus with half-hipped roof, marked 1839

==== Schönenberg ====
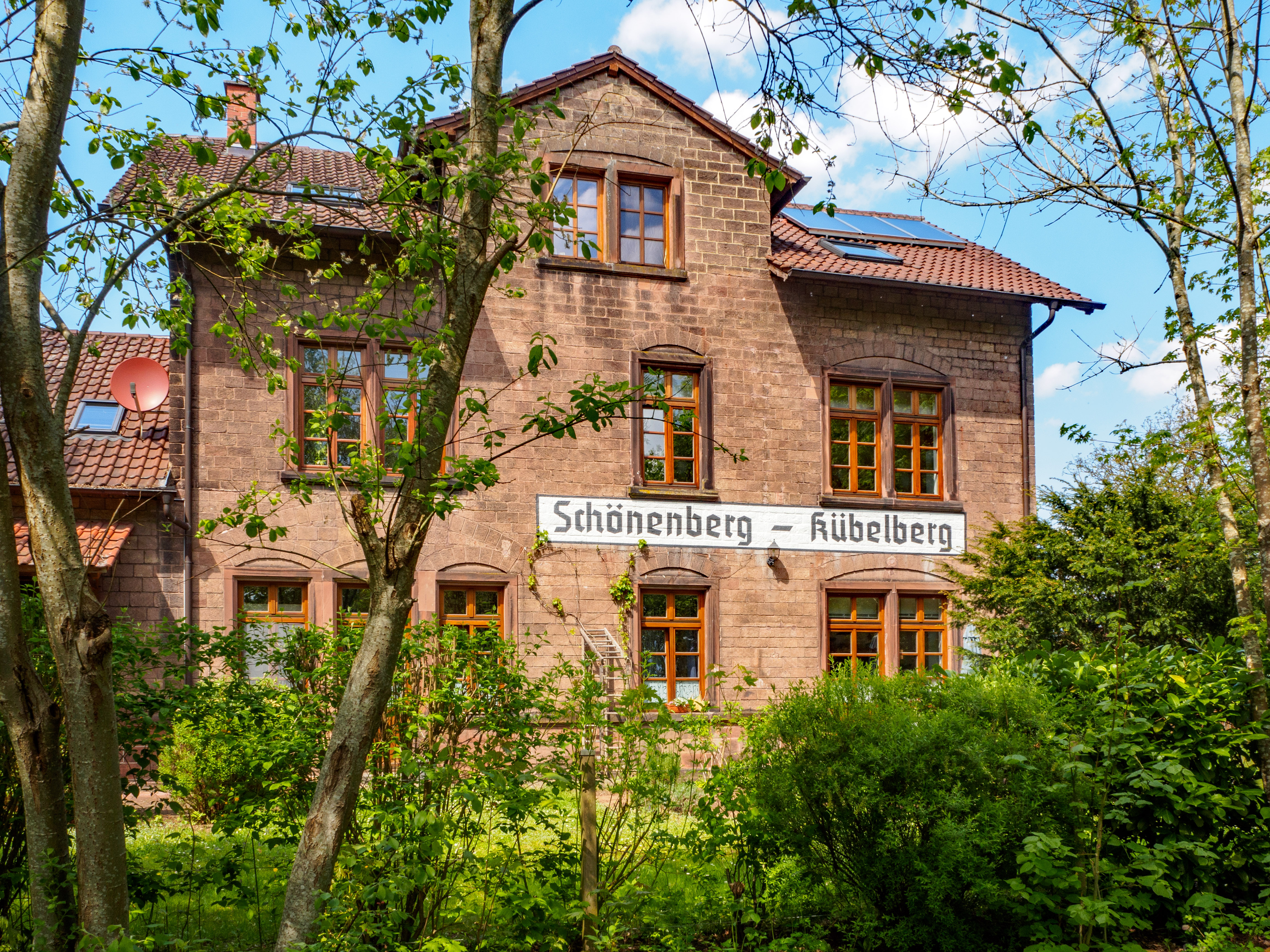
Schönenberg, Bahnhofstraße 48/52 monumental zone: railway station

- Bahnhofstraße 48/52 (monumental zone) – railway station with side buildings (pissoir and storage building) and railway hotel; railway station (no. 52) sandstone-block building, 1903/1904, spire light after 1920; railway hotel: sandstone-framed building with half-hipped roof, 1908
- Glanstraße 50 – dwelling wing of a former Quereinhaus, partly timber-frame (plastered), 18th century, wooden gallery and enclosure possibly from the latter half of the 19th century; characterizes street's appearance

=== Regular events ===
Schönenberg-Kübelberg has old customs such as the Carnival parade (Faschingsumzug) at Shrovetide, the St. Martin's Day children's parade and its own ways of celebrating kermises, as well as newer customs such as Halloween, among others. The best known event is the Easter Market (Ostermarkt) that the people of Schönenberg have been holding since 1744 on the second Sunday before Easter. The Johannisfest is a regional folk festival held on the second Sunday before the Nativity of St. John the Baptist (24 June). The Schönenberger Kerwe (kermis), called the Bartholomäusfest ("Saint Bartholomew’s Festival") falls on the first Sunday before Saint Bartholomew's Day (24 August). There are an Oktoberfest on the first weekend in October and a Christmas Market on the third day of Advent. The Seefest ("Lake Festival") in July, meanwhile, is gaining in importance. The people of Kübelberg celebrate their church consecration festival on the first Sunday in September. There are other festivals in the outlying centres of Sand and Schmittweiler.

=== Clubs ===
Schönenberg-Kübelberg is blessed with a vast array of clubs. The following ones are registered with the authorities:

- Angelsportverein (angling)
- Brieftaubenzüchterverein (carrier pigeon raising)
- Bündnis 90/Die Grünen (political party)
- CDU Gemeindeverband (CDU municipal organization)
- CDU-Ortsverein (CDU local association)
- China-Kampfkunst (martial arts)
- Deutsches Rotes Kreuz (German Red Cross)
- Elisabethenverein
- Evangelischer Kirchenchor (Evangelical church choir)
- Evangelischer Krankenpflegeverein Schönenberg-Gries (nursing)
- Evangelische Christusgemeinde ("Community of Christ")
- FFW Schönenberg-Kübelberg (volunteer fire brigade)
- Fördergemeinschaft der Realschule (Realschule promotional association)
- Förderkreis KJGF
- Förderverein TuS Schönenberg (sport club promotional association)
- Förderverein für Jugendarbeit in der evangelischen Kirchengemeinde (promotional association for youth work in the Evangelical church community)
- FWG "bürgernah" (voters’ group)
- Gesangverein 1899 Frohsinn (singing club)
- Gesangverein Liederkranz 1921 Kübelberg (singing club)
- Gesangverein Liederkranz Schmittweiler (singing club)
- Gewerbeverein (homeowners’, flatowners’ and landowners’ association)
- Heimatliebe Schönenberg
- IG Bergbau und Energie Schönenberg-Kübelberg (trade union)
- Junge Union
- Jugendfeuerwehr (youth fire brigade)
- Karate-Dojo (martial arts)
- Katholische Frauengemeinschaft (Catholic women’s association)
- Katholische Junge Gemeinde (Catholic youth association)
- Katholische Kirchengemeinde Kübelberg (Kübelberg Catholic church community)
- Katholischer Kirchenchor (Catholic church choir)
- Katholisches Bildungswerk (Catholic education works)
- Kleintierzuchtverein (small-animal raising)
- Kolpingfamilie (Kolping family)
- Komitee Erhaltung Glanbahn (railway preservation society)
- Kulturhistorischer Verein "Gericht Kübelberg" (cultural history)
- Landfrauenverein Sand (countrywomen’s club)
- Männergesangverein 1899 Sand (men’s singing club)
- Modellbahnfreunde Schönenberg-Kübelberg (model railways)
- Obst- und Gartenbauverein (fruit and vegetable growing)
- Pensionärsverein Kübelberg (pensioners’ club)
- Pensionärsverein Schmittweiler (pensioners’ club)
- Pensionärsverein Schönenberg/Sand (pensioners’ club)
- Pfälzerwaldverein (hiking)
- Pfälzischer Bauern- und Winzerschaft (farmers’ and winegrowers’ association)
- Pfarrkapelle Kübelberg (orchestra)
- Pferdefreunde Kübelberg (horses)
- Schachverein VG Schönenberg (chess)
- Schiffsmodellbauclub (ship model building)
- Schützenbruderschaft Schönenberg (shooting)
- SPD Ortsverein Schönenberg (political party)
- Sportverein 1920 Kübelberg (sport club)
- Sportverein 1920 Sand (sport club)
- Sportverein 1928 Schmittweiler (sport club)
- Tennisclub 78T
- Traberclub TTC Sand 1962
- Turnverein 1970 (gymnastic club)
- TuS 1890 Schönenberg (sport club)
- VdK Ortsverband Schönenberg-Kübelberg (advocacy and help for those with handicaps)
- Verbandsgemeindefeuerwehr (Verbandsgemeinde fire brigade)
- Verein Partnerschaft überwindet Grenzen ("Partnership Overcomes Borders")
- Verein der Vogelfreunde (birds)
- Verein für Deutsche Schäferhunde (German Shepherds)
- Vereinsunion Sand

== Economy and infrastructure ==
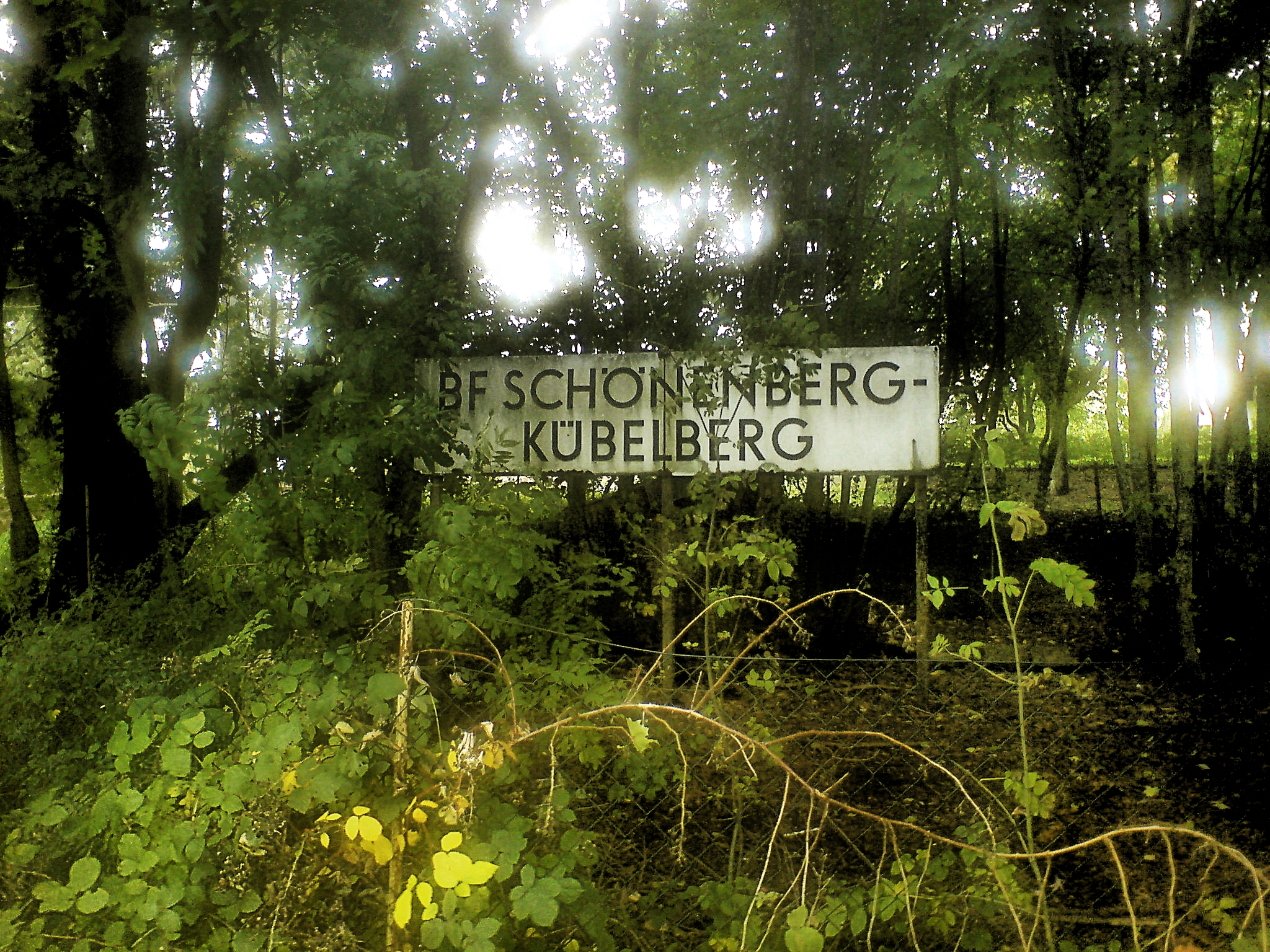
Station sign at the former railway station

=== Economic structure ===
Owing to its central location in the south of Kusel district, Schönenberg-Kübelberg has grown into a local supply and service centre. There are several hypermarkets and discount stores as well as many one-line businesses filling household and craft needs, a car dealership with workshops, a big motor vehicle scrapping and salvaging business, craft businesses in building and architectural engineering, a construction company, a building supply wholesaler, bank branches and professionals such as lawyers and physicians.

In both Schönenberg and Kübelberg, the villagers earned their livelihoods mainly from agriculture, although there were also craftsmen and peat cutters. Beginning in the 19th century, there was a gradual shift that led to agriculture directly feeding ever fewer people, and many farm boys seeking work in industry. Unlike many other villages, which offer very little in the way of job opportunities, Schönenberg-Kübelberg has developed considerable industry of its own. Nevertheless, many working people must commute to work, to the industrial operations in Kaiserslautern and to the mines in the Saarland, even to smaller centres like Landstuhl and Homburg. After the Second World War, many jobs became available in the course of the stationing of US Forces at Ramstein Air Base and Miesau Army Depot. This development spurred a strong upswing in the population.

=== Education ===
In the course of the Reformation, the Electors promoted schooling. As early as 1510, a schoolteacher is believed to have taught classes in Kübelberg, even though the village did not yet have any schoolhouse. In 1615, the Reformed pastor Nicolaus reported to the Oberamt of Kaiserslautern: "At Kübelberg is a schoolmaster, Petrus Matzenbach. Has a salary from the Collector of 30 Rhenish guilders … also seven malter of corn. … This schoolmaster is hardworking, good at his calling …". During the Thirty Years' War (which began only three years after Pastor Nicolaus’s report), schooling fell by the wayside, and it only began again once many children began growing up in the families that came to settle the village after the war. In Schönenberg and Kübelberg, schooling took different directions in each village. Kübelberg, as a new Catholic parish, established in the early 18th century a Catholic school, though the schoolteacher had to wait a long time for his monetary and material emoluments, since according to the rules, there was still supposed to be a Protestant schoolteacher. The Catholic school also sought out Catholic children from the neighbouring villages, mainly from Schönenberg. The building of the Catholic schoolhouse in Kübelberg about 1705 was financed by the pastor himself. Until then, school was taught at private houses or at the rectory. In 1754, the Schultheiß reported to the Oberamt that the Catholic schoolmaster in Kübelberg had to teach 60 children and received 10 Malter of corn and 25 guilders each year, lived in a small, not well-built house and had at his disposal a little garden. About the children’s behaviour there was no complaint. Given the steady population growth, the available schoolhouse soon was no longer big enough for the village. In 1797, the people of Kübelberg got a new schoolhouse for all the area’s Catholic children. In this building, which would later become the convent, school was taught until 1910. In 1848, the municipality bought up the inn to convert it into a school, too. The number of Catholic children rose more quickly than the number of Evangelical children, and thus Schönenberg soon found itself having to make an equalization payment to Kübelberg. The year 1965 marked the last time that a school for Kübelberg alone stood on Pestalozzistraße in Kübelberg. Since the establishment of the Schulzentrum Süd, this building has served as a primary school for the whole, merged municipality of Schönenberg-Kübelberg. The Protestant children, mainly those from Schönenberg, at first attended school in neighbouring Miesau. Only about 1730 did the municipality of Schönenberg build a schoolhouse for the Reformed and Lutheran children. It was expanded in 1802. In 1821, a new Evangelical schoolhouse was built in Schönenberg, though after a few decades, it was no longer up to the task at hand. Thus, a new one was built in 1910, although great population growth also quickly made this one too small, particularly as Schönenberg introduced Christian community school. So, with the Second World War looming, Schönenberg began to build yet another schoolhouse, but this was left unfinished until after the war, whereupon it was built into a private house. For a while, the district maintained an agricultural vocational school near the Schönenberg schoolhouse in the time after the war. In 1972, there was a thorough reform of schooling. All schoolchildren from all four of Schönenberg-Kübelberg’s centres now attend a single primary school, which has no local peculiarities, nor denominational affiliations. From 1979 to 1982, the Schulzentrum Süd ("School Centre South") was built for all the Hauptschule students of the Verbandsgemeinde (Erich-Kästner-Schule). Also housed at this complex is a Realschule. The primary school pupils from the whole municipality are now taught at the schoolhouse on Pestalozzistraße. The nearest Gymnasium is in Homburg (not even in the same state), while special schools can be found in Kusel and Brücken. Nearby universities are in Homburg (Saarland University, Faculty of Medicine), Kaiserslautern (Kaiserslautern University of Technology), Trier (University of Trier) and Saarbrücken (Saarland University).

=== Transport ===
Schönenberg-Kübelberg is linked by Bundesstraße 423 (Mandelbachtal - Altenglan) to the national road network. Some 5 km to the south runs the Autobahn A 6 (Saarbrücken–Mannheim) with an interchange at Waldmohr, while roughly 13 km to the northeast runs the Autobahn A 62 (Kaiserslautern–Trier) with an interchange at Kusel. The former railway station on the Glan Valley Railway (Glantalbahn) in the municipality itself has been abandoned. Homburg and the even nearer Bruchmühlbach-Miesau have stations on the Mannheim–Saarbrücken railway (Pfälzische Ludwigsbahn). Public passenger transport is provided by bus routes that radiate from the municipality in almost every direction.

== Famous people ==
=== Famous people associated with the municipality ===
- Albert Buchheit (b. 1862 in Contwig; d. 1933 in Kirchmohr)

A Catholic priest, Buchheit was a well known church historian and author of the book Die säkularisierten Kirchengüter der Pfalz ("The Secularized Church Properties of the Palatinate"). After 1920, he was also the pastor in Kübelberg.

- Josef Hanß (b. 1871 in Steinwenden; d. 1957 in Landau)

A Catholic priest and author of religious writings, Hanß was a co-founder of the Sacred Heart Monastery (Herz-Jesu-Kloster) in the Schöntal near Neustadt an der Weinstraße. After he was ordained in 1894 he was chaplain in Kübelberg.

- Emil Nesseler (b. 1891 in Lauterecken; d. 1952 in Ludwigshafen)

A schoolteacher and manager of the Palatine Teachers’ Association, Nesseler was an author of regional historical literature, particularly dealing with the Ludwigshafen area. He was also the city archivist in Ludwigshafen and designed maps as instructional materials. After 1920, he was also a schoolteacher in Schönenberg.

- Peter Josef Ohmer (b. 1881; d. 1968 in Bad Bergzabern)

A Catholic priest and author of regional historical writings, Ohmer was active in the municipality of Hatzenbühl in many ways, and became an honorary citizen there. About 1904, he was chaplain in Kübelberg.
