= Saarländisches Bergbaumuseum =

Mining museum in Saarland, Germany

Coordinates: 49°20′58″N 7°15′34″E

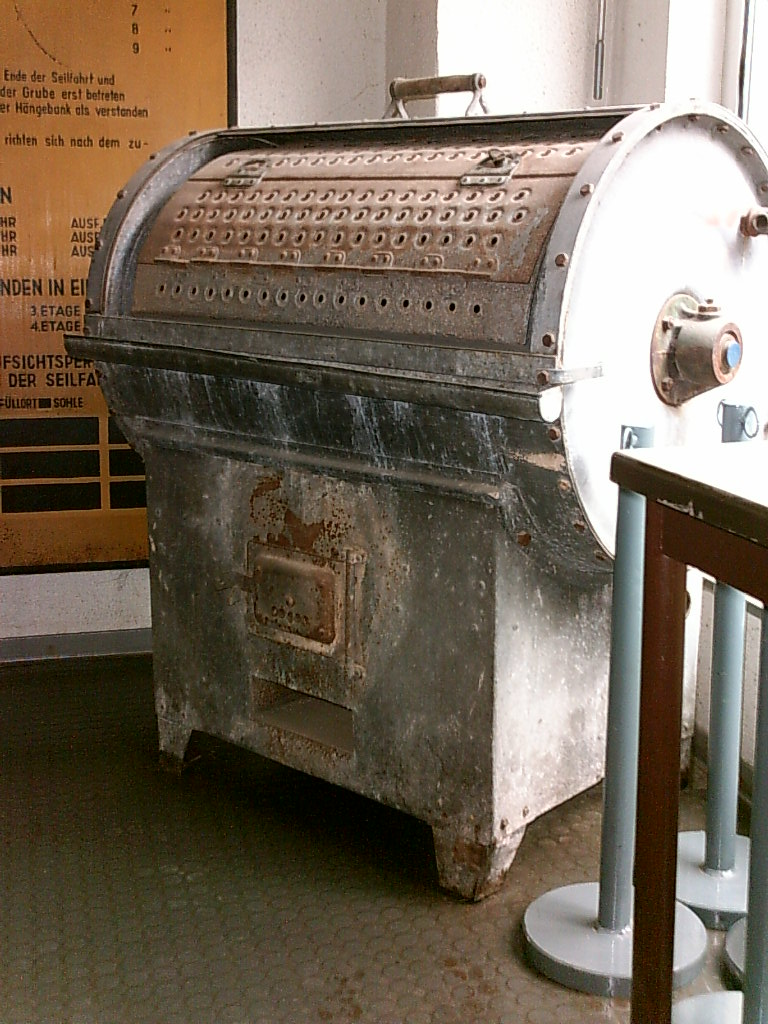

Saarländisches Bergbaumuseum is a museum of mining in Saarland, Germany.
