= Lacrymatory =

Small vessel in ancient tombs

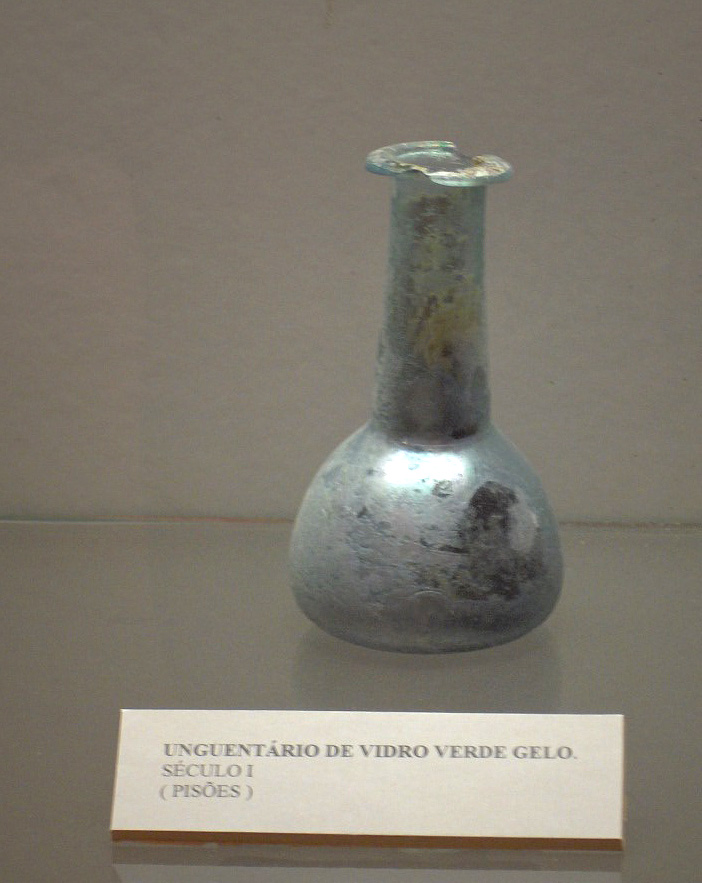
A Lacrymatory, at the Beja museum in Portugal.

A lacrymatory, lachrymatory or lacrimarium (from the Latin lacrima, 'tear') is a small vessel of terracotta or, more frequently, of glass, found in Roman and late Greek tombs, and formerly supposed to have been bottles into which mourners dropped their tears. They contained perfumes and unguents, and the finding of so many of these vessels in tombs is due to the use of unguents at funeral ceremonies. They are shaped like a spindle, or a flask with a long small neck and a body in the form of a bulb.

The term lacrimarium is deceptive; there is no evidence from the ancient world to suggest the use of these glass or ceramic vessels as 'tear-catchers'.
