= Bexbach =

- Town
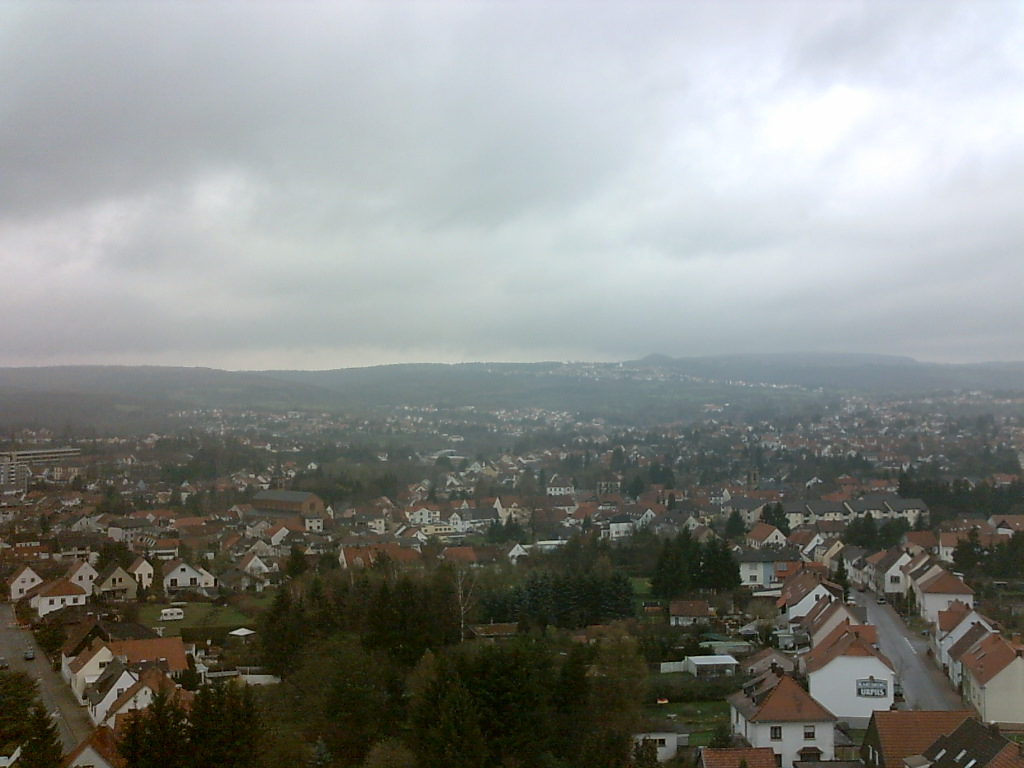

- Flag Coat of arms

- Location of Bexbach within Saarpfalz district
- Interactive map of Bexbach
- Location within Germany Location within Saarland
- Coordinates: 49°20′58″N 7°15′34″E
- Country: Germany
- State: Saarland
- District: Saarpfalz

Government
  - Mayor (2019–29): Christian Prech (CDU)

Area
  - Total: 31.09 km^{2} (12.00 sq mi)
- Elevation: 249 m (817 ft)

Population (2025-12-31)
  - Total: 17,730
  - Density: 570.3/km^{2} (1,477/sq mi)
- Time zone: UTC+01:00 (CET)
  - Summer (DST): UTC+02:00 (CEST)
- Postal codes: 66441–66450
- Dialling codes: 06826
- Vehicle registration: HOM
- Website: www.bexbach.de

Bexbach (German pronunciation: [ˈbɛksˌbax]) is a town in the Saarpfalz district, in Saarland, Germany. It is situated on the river Blies, approximatively 6 km east of Neunkirchen, and 25 km northeast of Saarbrücken. The Saarländisches Bergbaumuseum (Saarland Mining Museum) is located in the town.

== Sons and daughters of the town ==
- Edwin Hügel (1919-1988), politician (FDP), minister of economy, transport and agriculture in Cabinet Zeyer II (1982-1983)
- Gerd Dudenhöffer (born 1949), comedian and author

== International relations ==
Bexbach is twinned with:

- Edenkoben, Germany, since 1936
- Goshen, United States, since 1979
- Pornichet, France, since 1985
