= Bierbach an der Blies =

- Stadtteil of Blieskastel
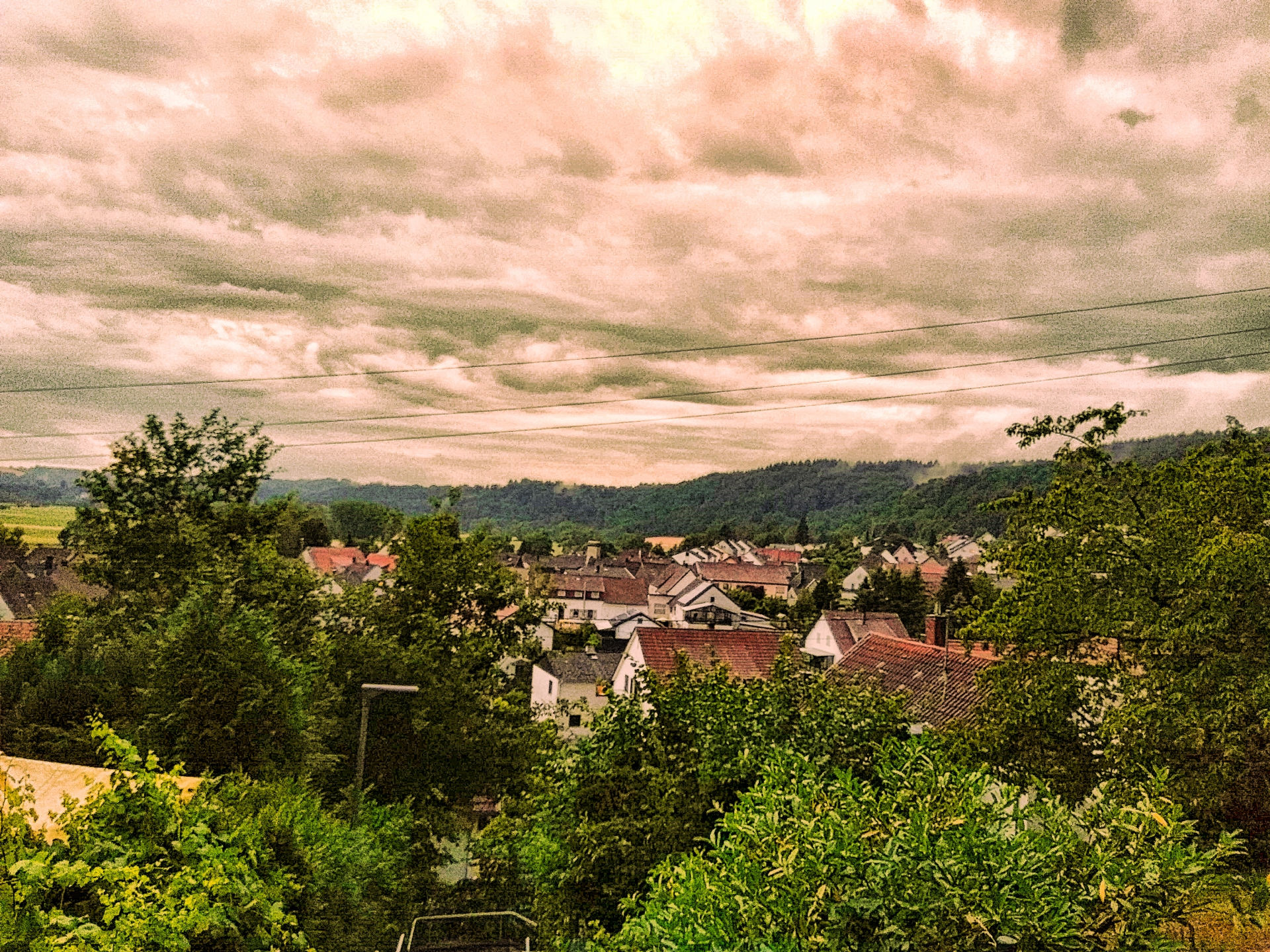
- View of Bierbach an der Blies

- Coat of arms
- Interactive map of Bierbach an der Blies
- Location within Germany Location within Saarland
- Coordinates: 49°15′47.9″N 7°17′08.7″E
- Country: Germany
- State: Saarland
- District: Saarpfalz-Kreis
- Town: Blieskastel

Area
  - Total: 1.03 km^{2} (0.40 sq mi)
- Elevation: 220 m (720 ft)

Population (2019-12-31)
  - Total: 1,696
  - Density: 1,650/km^{2} (4,260/sq mi)
- Time zone: UTC+01:00 (CET)
  - Summer (DST): UTC+02:00 (CEST)
- Postal codes: 66440
- Dialling codes: 06842
- Vehicle registration: HOM
- Website: www.blieskastel.de

Bierbach an der Blies is a part (Stadtteil) of Blieskastel, Saarland, Germany. It is part of the Bliesgau and was founded on the right river bank of the Blies. As a consequence of the territorial and administrative reform of 1974 in Saarland, Bierbach ceased to be an independent municipality and became a part of the town of Blieskastel and incorporated within the district Saarpfalz-Kreis of which Homburg is the administrative seat.

== Geography, climate, and population ==
=== Geography ===
Einöd-Ingweiler, Saarland

Climate chart (precipitation, max. and min. temperature)
J	F	M	A	M	J	J	A	S	O	N	D
55 3 −2	50 5 −1	46 9 1	47 14 4	62 18 7	70 21 11	62 23 12	76 23 12	59 20 9	48 14 6	61 8 2	63 4 −1
- █ Average max. and min. temperatures in °C
- █ Precipitation totals in mm
Imperial conversion
J	F	M	A	M	J	J	A	S	O	N	D
2.2 37 28	2 41 29	1.8 49 33	1.9 57 38	2.4 65 45	2.8 71 51	2.4 74 54	3 73 53	2.3 67 49	1.9 57 42	2.4 46 35	2.5 39 31
- █ Average max. and min. temperatures in °F
- █ Precipitation totals in inches

Bierbach is a small village situated in the midst of meadows and woodlands that are part of the Bliesgau. August Becker in his travel guide "Die Pfalz und die Pfälzer" in 1858 called the Bierbach lea the most beautiful in the Bavarian Palatinate.

Except for small patches of land that are close to the river on the Bliestal, the ground is mainly composed of sandstone, which makes it difficult to be used for growing food crops. For this reason it was planted with trees and used as a wood resource and as grazing area for cows. The center of the village sits about 220 m (720 ft) above sea level. The highest points are the Steinberg with 349 m (1,145 ft) and the Schucht with approx. 332 m (1,089 ft), respectively. Within a radius of 10 km (6.2 mi), six larger towns can be easily reached: Blieskastel, Homburg, Zweibrücken, St. Ingbert, Neunkirchen and Bexbach. The distance by air to Saarbrücken, the capital of Saarland, is 23 km (14 mi).

=== Climate ===
Saarland is one of the warmest regions in Germany. The yearly mean temperature is approximately 14°C. The climate widely corresponds to the usual Central European weather patterns. During the winter months, temperatures below 0°C can be reached and the summer months can be rather hot reaching up to 40°C.

According to the Köppen climate classification, the climate in Bierbach can be classified as CFB. These climates are often found on the western coasts of continents. They are characterized by a humid climate with short dry summers. Heavy precipitation occurs during the mild winters because of continuous presence of mid-latitude cyclones. In Bierbach the climate is warm and temperate. Even in the driest months, there is a significant amount of precipitation. The average annual temperature is 9.2 °C and approx. 699 mm of precipitation falls annually.

=== Population ===
Population Distribution in Bierbach an der Blies (31.12.2017)
1. German (male) (45.5%)
2. German (female) (49.4%)
3. Non-German (male) (2.70%)
4. Non-German (female) (2.40%)

According to the official statistics provided by the town Blieskastel (December 31, 2017), the district Bierbach has a total of 1698 inhabitants of which 95% are Germans, and 52% are female. Overall the fraction Bierbach constitutes 8% of the total population of Blieskastel.

== History ==
=== Early Reports and Etymology ===
The area of Bierbach was probably already inhabited in prehistoric times during the Paleolithic era, as finds such as a hand-axe that was found in Blieskastel and is dated 200000 BCE would indicate.

Bishop Pirminius expanded the Christian Religion in the area. He lived between 700 CE and 753 CE and was a monk and missionary during the Merovingian era. He founded and restored numerous monasteries in Alemannia, along the Upper Rhine and the Constance region. Traces of his missionary activity in the area can be found in the names of some of the places, streets and buildings in Bierbach. Some have speculated that the name of the village derives from the name "Pirminius". According to this theory the land of the monastery was called Pirmann's land, and those who lived on the lands were called the people of Pirmann (Pirmaansleute). The forest at the monastery was called Pirmann's forest (Pirmannswald) as it is still called today. Two small streams had their origin in this forest: "Groß-Pirminsbach" and "Klein-Pirminsbach". Constrictions and abbreviations of words, something that is quite common in the evolution of language over time could have led to constrict "Groß-Pirminsbach" into "Groß-Birbach" and eventually into "Birbach" and lastly into today's form "Bierbach".

A different hypothesis stipulates that the development of the name is related to the remains of Roman buildings in the area of Bierbach. This acknowledges that the origin of the word "Bier" derives most of the time from the old high German word "bûrea", "bûri", or "bûr" which meant building. It would be conceivable that Germanic settlers after the Romans had abandoned their settlements would call the greek "Bûribach" ("Bûri" = "building", "bach" = "greek"), as it was flowing in the area were previous Roman buildings had stood. In the 16th century the name would have been reinterpreted into "Bierbach". Similar name evolutions can also be seen in other places such as Bierbach in the Odenwald, in which case "Burbach" as it was called in 1314 CE transitioned into "Bierbach" in 1748 CE, where similarly the first part of the name derives from "bûrea" and the second part denominates a creek. In 1563 Count Wolfgang von Zweibrücken asked the geometer and cartographer Tilemann Stella to assess the offices of Zweibrücken and Kirkel. At that time he documented the name of today's "Bierbach" to be "Beurbach", which would be the linguistic sound evolution from "Bûribach".

=== Findings from the Roman Era ===
==== The Roman Villa of Bierbach ====
Roman Villa at Bierbach
- Römische Villa
- Bierbach an der Blies
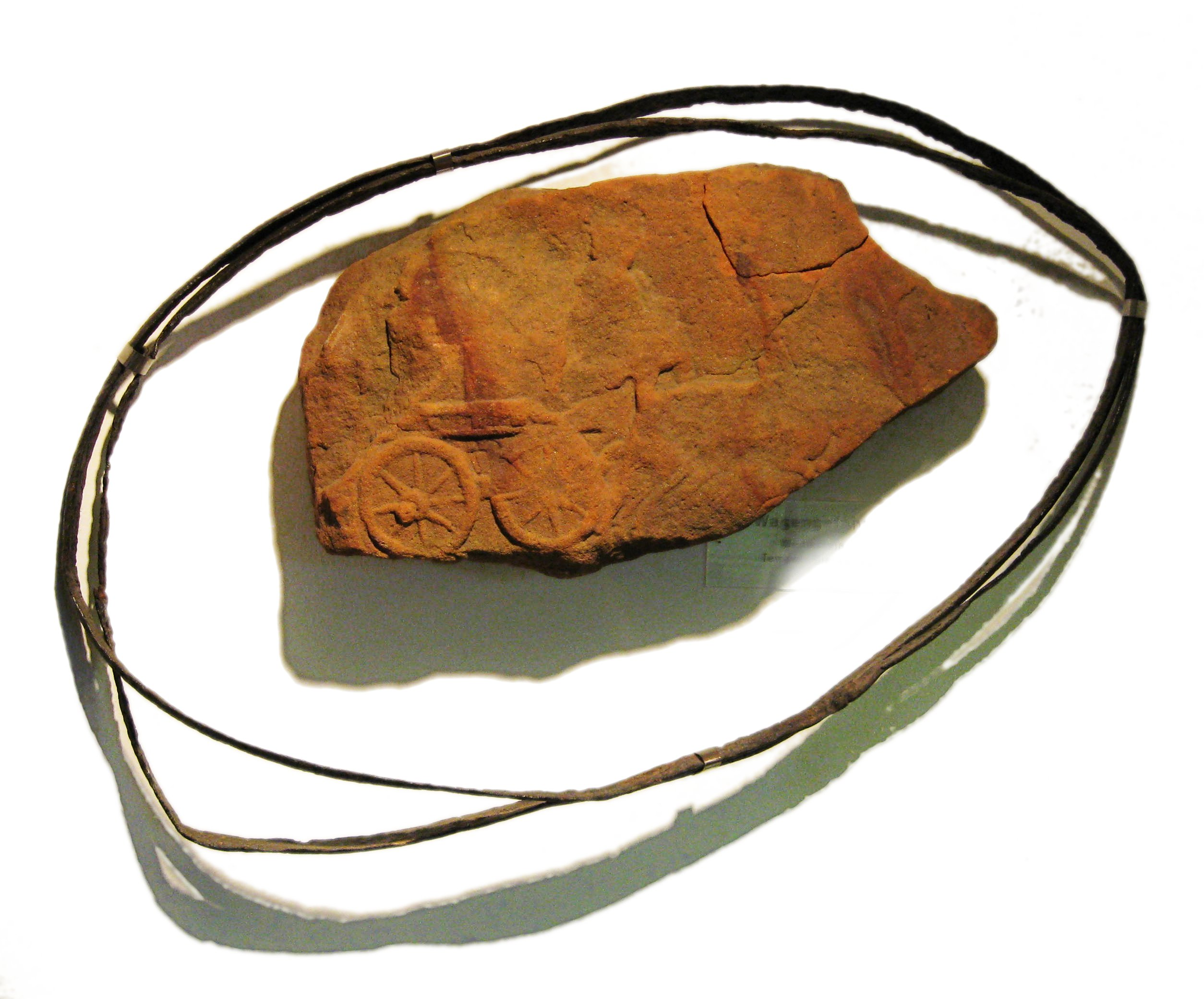
- Roman Wheel found at Bierbach

Site information
- Type: Villa, Archaeological site
- Code: DE-SL
- Condition: Ruins (After Excavations covered up again)

Location
- Location within Germany
- Coordinates: 49°16′0.5772″N 7°18′46.008″E
- Height: 220 m above sea level (NN)

Site history
- Built: 200 BCE

In 1804 a farmer found artifacts from the Roman era while working on his fields. These finds, however, were not further investigated. More than a century later in 1924, during the excavation work for the new machine factory Dingler, the remains of an extended Roman villa were discovered which probably used to be the summer residence of a wealthy Roman. The reconstruction showed that the two story villa had a representative row of columns and a large portico. The rectangular building had a length of about 68 m (223 ft) and a depth of about 10 m (33 ft).

The center of the 21-room building was a large hall with a four-meter-wide portal. In the courtyard, at the opposite side of the pillar row, stood a splendidly decorated grave monument. Parts of the monument had been excavated already in 1809 by the archivist and Justice of the Peace, Franz Carl Derkum. Parts of the tomb and its reconstruction are now exhibited in Speyer at the Historical Museum of the Palatinate. Other artifacts from the excavation at the villa are displayed at the Historical Museum of the Palatinate in Speyer, in the Museum of Pre- and Proto-history in Saarbrücken and at the nearby Schwarzenacker Roman Museum. However, there was no interest at that time to make the finds accessible to the public and transform the area into an archaeological zone.

==== The Temple District on the Rödersberg ====
Temple District Klosterwald
- Tempel Bezirk im Klosterwald
- Klosterwald by Bierbach an der Blies
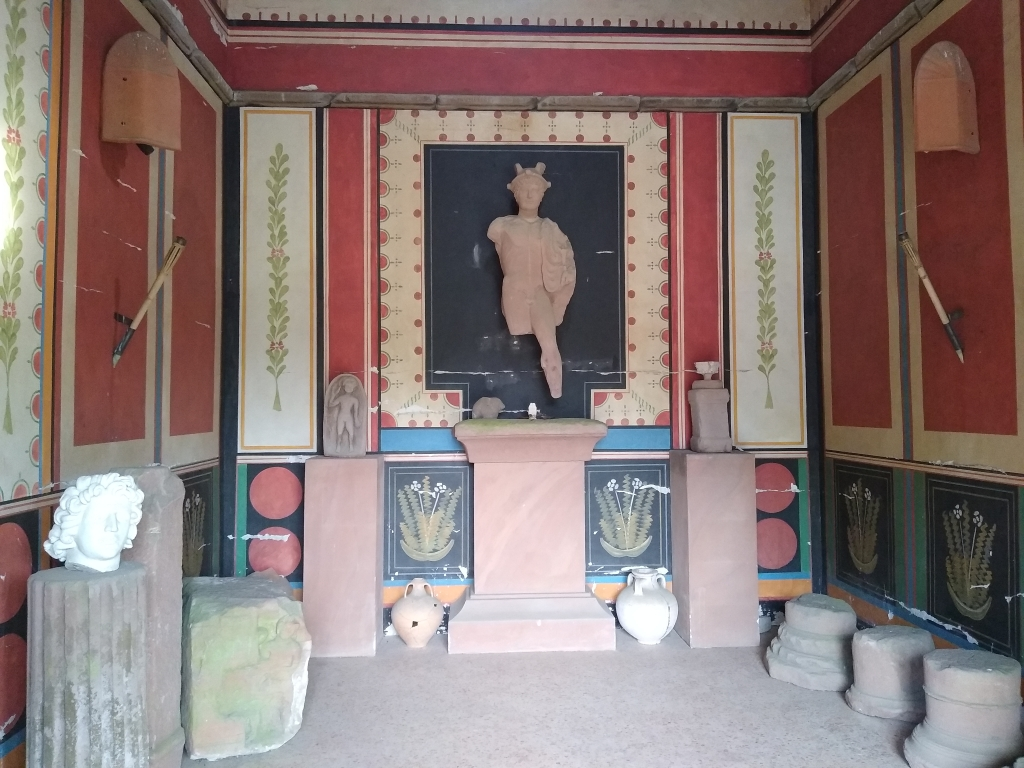
- Reconstruction of Gallo-Roman Sanctuary (Fanum) from Temple District at the Klosterwald by Bierbach an der Blies

Site information
- Type: Temenos, Fanum, Archaeological site
- Code: DE-SL
- Condition: Ruins (After Excavations covered up again)

Location
- Location within Germany
- Coordinates: 49°17′35.9844″N 7°17′22.7328″E
- Height: 320 m above sea level (NN)

Site history
- Built: 200 BCE

Between Bierbach and Wörschweiler, a Gallo-Roman temple district was found on the Rödersberg which is located in the Bierbacher Klosterwald. The approximately 60 m-long (200 ft) area was surrounded by a 33 m-long (108 ft) wall. The sanctuary originally included two temples. The ruins were discovered in 1927 by forest workers.

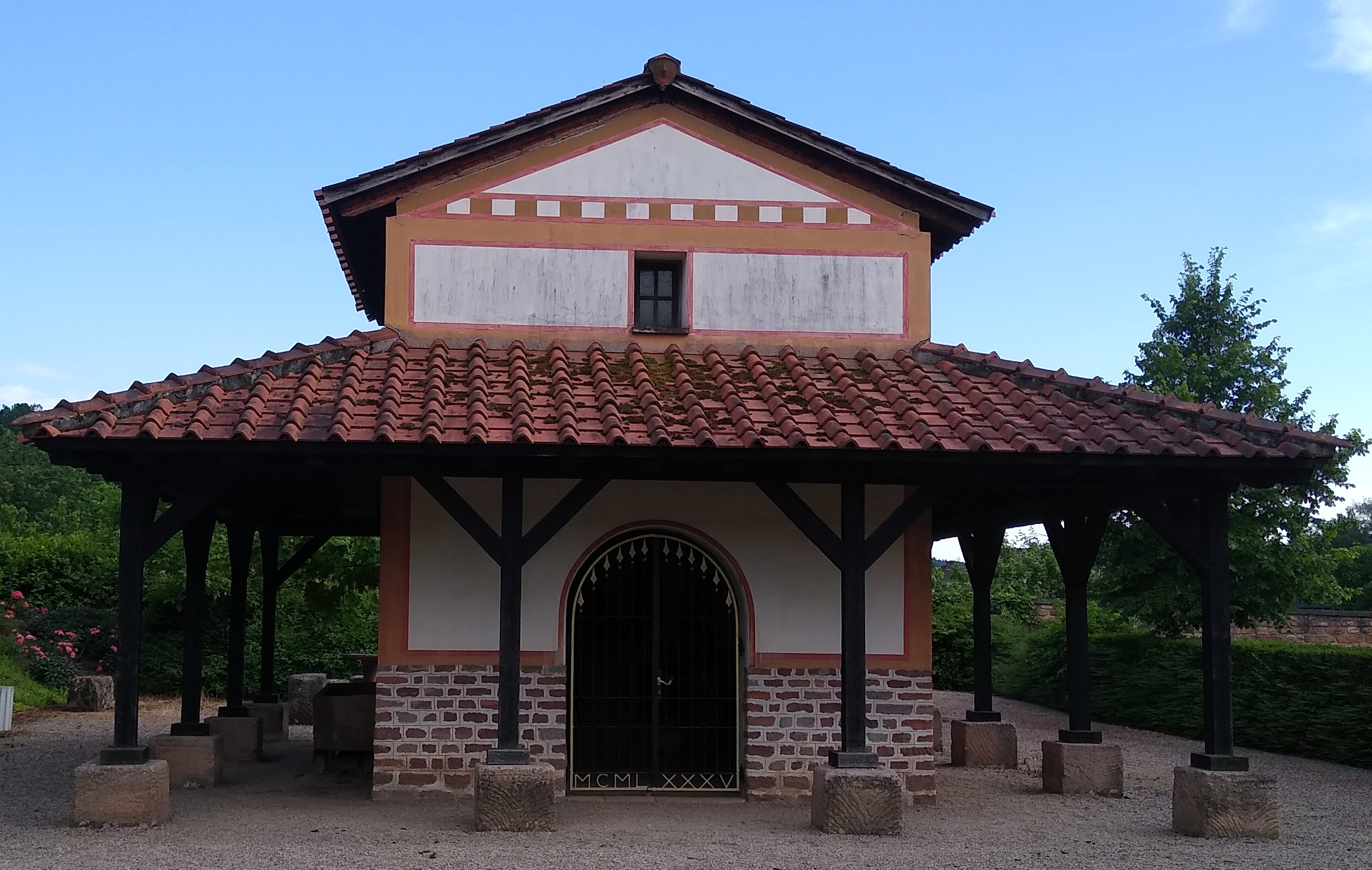
Reconstruction of Gallo-Roman Sanctuary (Fanum) from Temple District at the Klosterwald by Bierbach an der Blies

The excavations were led by the State conservator Carl Klein. He found two secondary buildings, additional foundations and a well or cistern. After evaluating the finds it was concluded, that the twin temples was dedicated to the God Mercury and his wife Rosmerta. A significant number of coins were found at the temple district that was helpful in dating the time period in which the temples were frequented. According to time periods in which the coins were in use, it can be estimated that the temple district was in use at least between the second century BCE and the end of the fourth century CE. It thus would predate the Vicus in Schwarzenacker and would still have been in use after the destruction of the Vicus in 274 CE. After the excavations were completed the temple distract was again completely filled with earth and the ruins are no longer visible.

=== Historical Records from the High Middle Ages and Onward ===
The first documented mention of Bierbach is found in a property exchange deed of the neighboring monastery Wörschweiler in 1230. According to historic records, Count Heinrich of Castel and Heinrich of Kirkel exchanged estates of the monastery Wörschweiler in Hassel for estates of Bierbach.

In 1558, the Wörschweiler Abbey was abolished by the Duke of Palatine Zweibrücken who had become Protestant. Bierbach belonged to the duchy of Palatine Zweibrücken until in 1794 revolutionary French troops occupied the left bank of the Rhine and thus also Bierbach. With the Peace of Campo Formio in 1797, France annexed the area and in 1798 introduced its administrative system.

Following the defeat of Napoleon at the Battle of Leipzig in 1813 and the capture of the Left Bank of the Rhine by the Allies in January 1814, the recaptured territory was put under the provisional authority of the General Government of the Middle Rhine. However, from June 16 of that same year, it was placed under the Imperial-Royal Austrian and Royal Bavarian Joint Land Administration Commission.

On 14 April 1816, a treaty was signed between Austria and Bavaria, in which various territorial changes were agreed upon. As a consequence Bierbach which was part of the district of Zweibrücken became part of the Bavarian Rheinkreis of which the city of Speyer became the capital. After the lost First World War the Treaty of Versailles of 1919 ordered the separation of western areas of the Palatinate. They were assigned to the newly formed Saar area, which in turn was placed under the administration of the League of Nations. These parts of the territory form today's Saarland and the Saar-Palatinate county. Thus, Homburg, St. Ingbert and a part of the county of Zweibrücken to which Bierbach belonged were incorporated into the new Saar area.

As a consequence of the territorial and administrative reform of 1974, Bierbach ceased to be an independent municipality and became a municipal district of the city of Blieskastel.

== Churches and Cemetery ==
=== Roman Catholic Church Herz Jesu ===
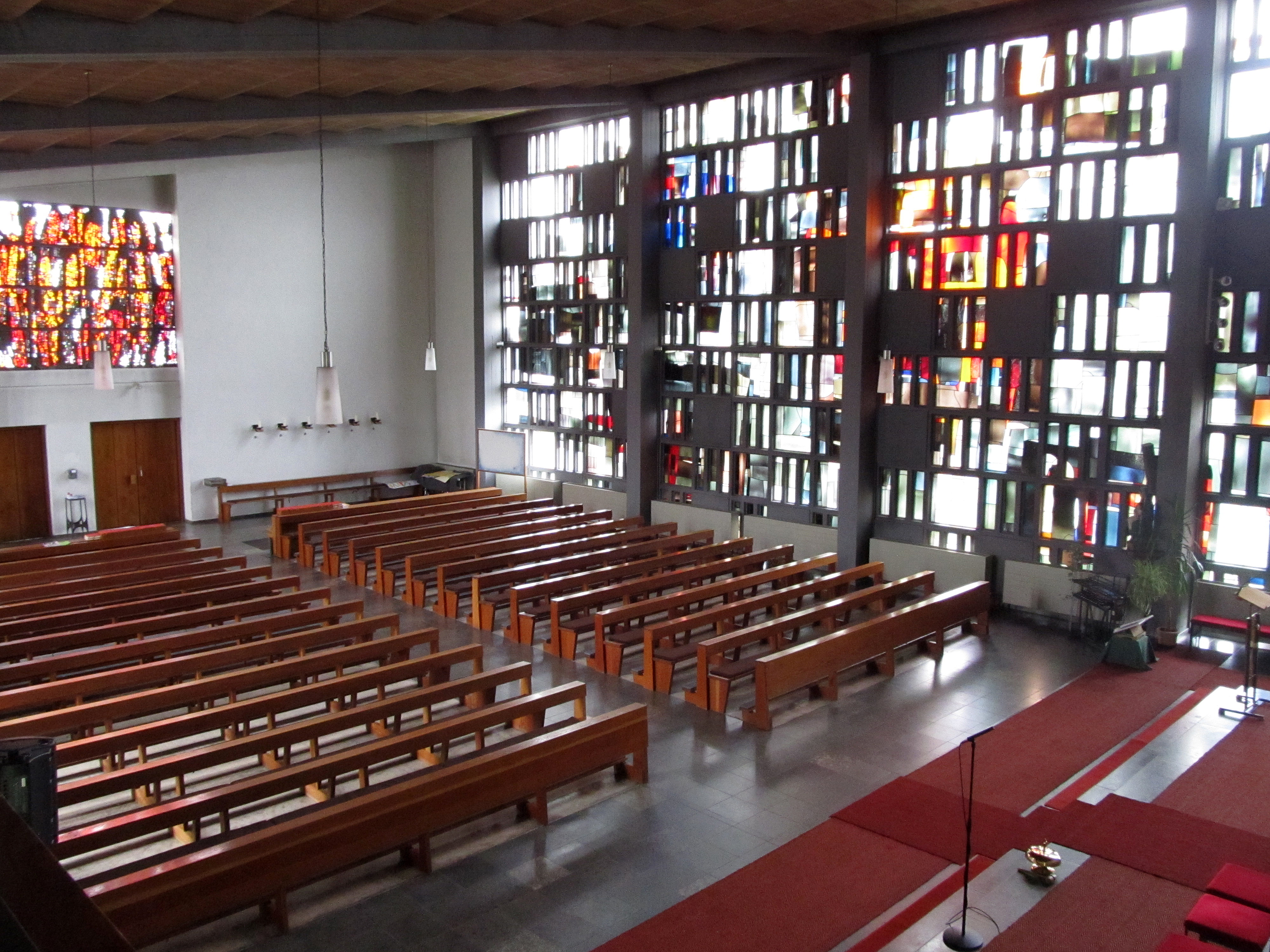
Bierbach Herz Jesu Innen Blick von Empore

The parish Bierbach exists since the year 1482. In the years 1466 to 1482 the so-called Fraternity Chapel (Bruderschaftskapelle) was built in Bierbach. After the Protestant Reformation the chapel came into Protestant possession.

In 1920, the catholic church construction association bought the old church and made modifications to the building. On 11 June 1923, the renovated church building was consecrated by Bishop Ludwig Sebastian and named Herz Jesu Kirche. After World War II, the number of Catholics living in Bierbach grew rapidly and the remodeled church became too small. In 1960, therefore, the foundation stone was laid for the new Herz Jesu church on the Hügelstrasse. On June 18, 1961, the Catholic parish church of the Sacred Heart was inaugurated. The old church that emerged from the Brotherhood Chapel and bore 500 years of contemporary history was demolished in 1963.

The church is now parish church in the Decanat Saarpfalz in the Bishopry of Speyer.

=== Protestant Church ===
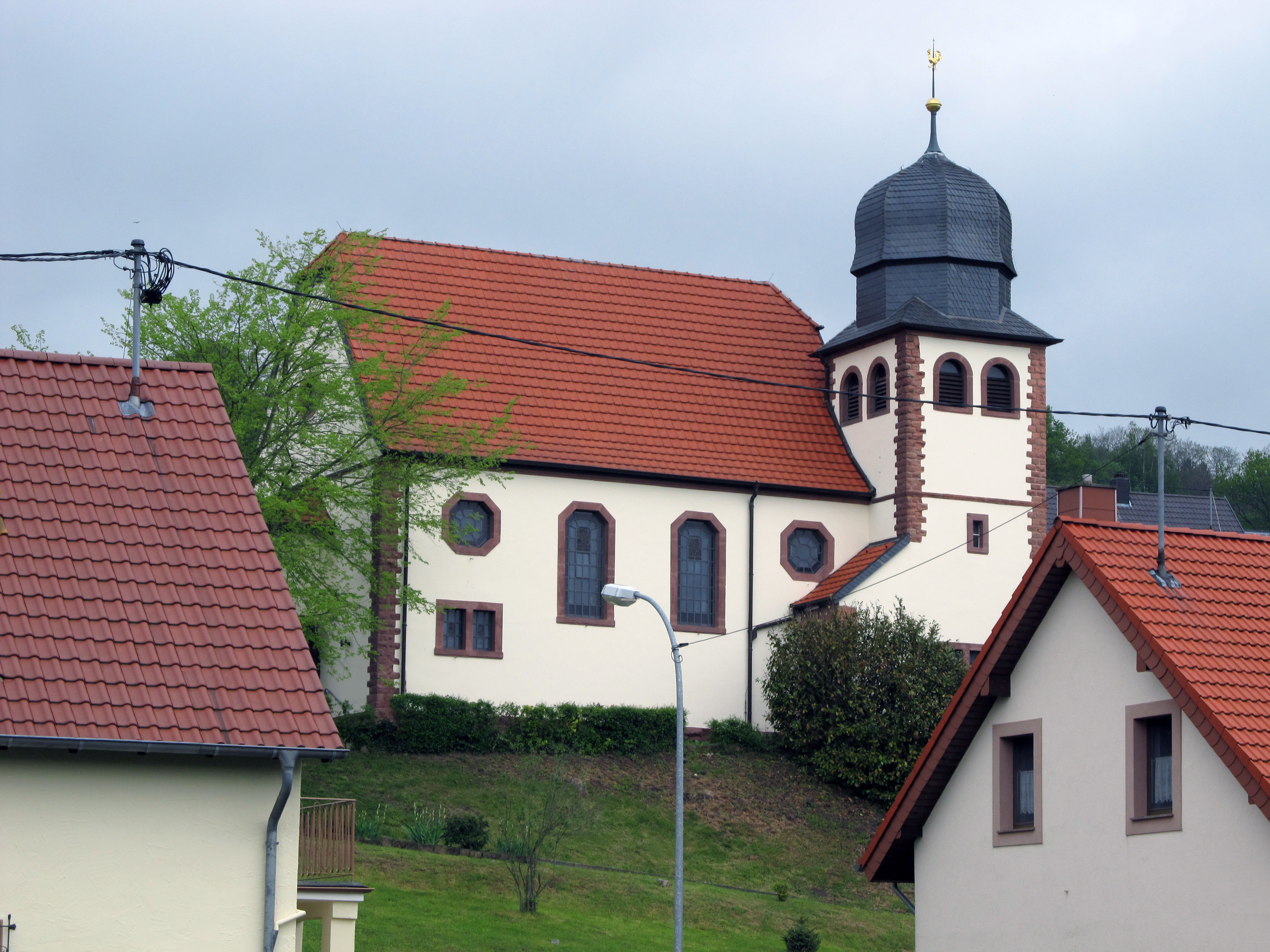
Protestant Church in Bierbach an der Blies

The Protestant Church of Bierbach is located on a southern slope in the midst of the old village with a view over the Bliestal. The building was designed by C. M. Rey from Kaiserslautern as a simple hall construction with a short choir room and an attached bell tower. The building is considered to be a good example of a church build in the neo-Baroque style. The church was inaugurated in 1910 and built with funds of the Gustav Adolf foundation. The church is part of the Protestant Parish of Blieskastel and incorporated in the Evangelische Landeskirche of the Palatinate.

=== Cemetery ===
The cemetery is located at the west end of the outskirts of the village. The graveyard is under the cemetery administration of Blieskastel.
