= Villers-Bettnach Abbey =

Abbey in Moselle, France

Coordinates: 49°14′N 6°22′E

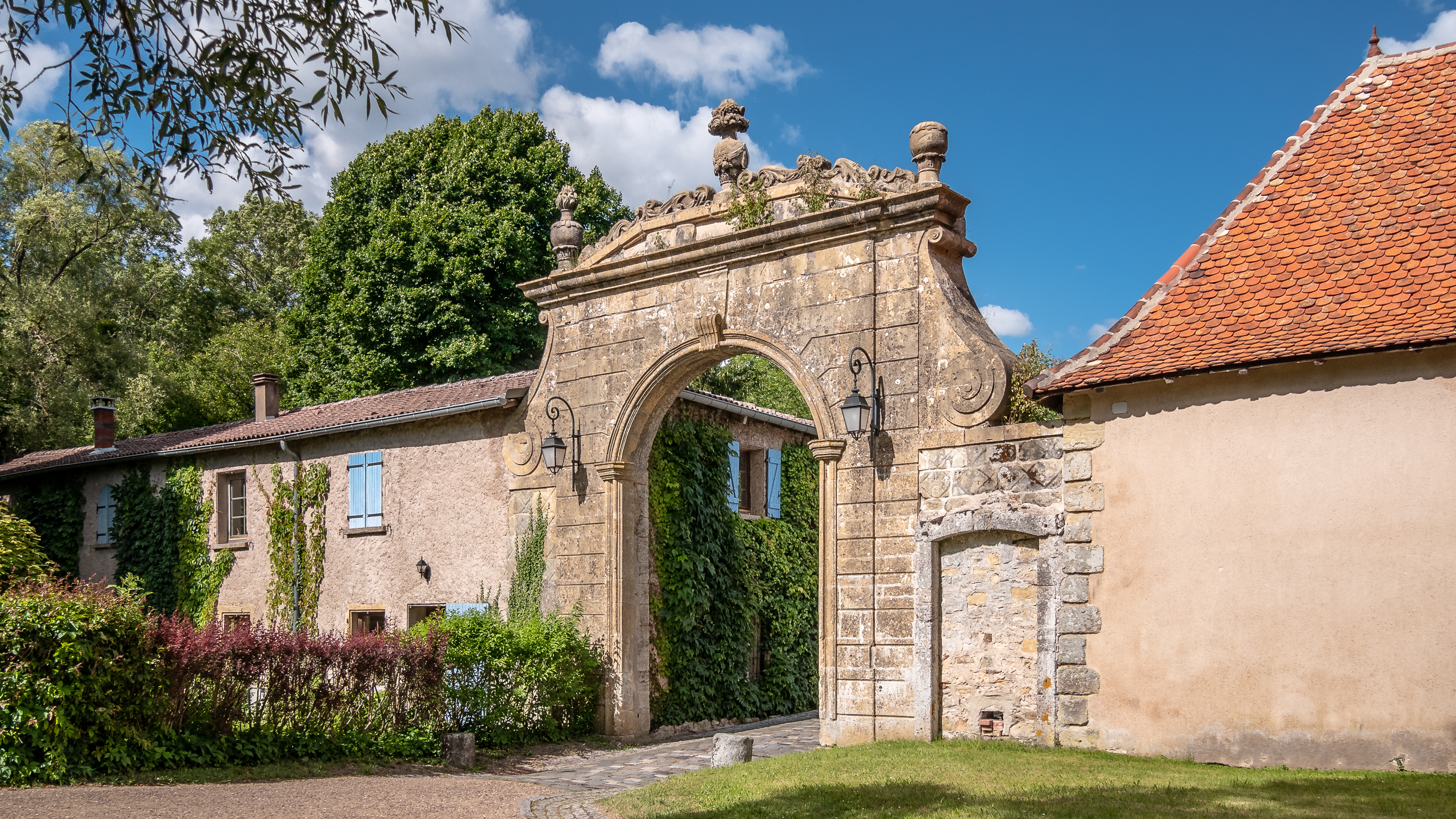
Gateway to the abbey: the Portail Coislin

Villers-Bettnach Abbey (Latin: Villerium; German: Weiler-Bettnach) is a former Cistercian abbey in the commune of Saint-Hubert in the Moselle department, France. The monastery site is about 22 kilometres north-east of Metz, in the valley of the little River Canner, and was classed as a monument historique on 28 March 1905.

== History ==
In 1134 Heinrich von Spanheim, abbot of Morimond Abbey, founded Villers-Bettnach Abbey on land given for the purpose by Simon I, Duke of Lorraine; Heinrich himself was the first abbot, holding the position together with that at Morimond. The community flourished, and monks from Villers-Bettnach later settled a number of daughter houses: Viktring Abbey in Carinthia (1142); Eusserthal Abbey in the Palatinate (1148); Wörschweiler Abbey in Wörschweiler, now a part of Homburg (1171); Zagreb Abbey (1257 or 1274; but note that Janauschek ascribes the foundation of Zagreb to Topusko Abbey, and others to Viktring Abbey); and Pontifroy Abbey in Metz (1323). Cambron Abbey in Belgium is occasionally claimed as a daughter house of Villers-Bettnach, but this seems doubtful.

Among other properties Villers-Bettnach owned a grange with salt pans in Marsal and townhouses in Metz and Sierck-les-Bains.

In 1552 the monastery was laid waste. Between 1724 and 1729 a new church was built. The French Revolution caused the dissolution of the monastery in 1790, and the abbey buildings and site were turned over to agricultural uses. Those buildings that survived were later acquired by the town of Boulay-Moselle (Bolchen), which built a convalescent home there. The site is now looked after by the Association des Amis des Sites de St-Hubert.

== Buildings and site ==
The cloister was sited to the north of the church. The monumental gateway arch of the 17th century (the Portail Coislin) survives, as do numerous remains of the 13th century church, a vaulted hall church of six bays with a transept and a polygonal apse, and a Chapel of St. Catherine with bifora windows, which stands over a building of the 12th century. Another survival is the 17th century Peasants' Chapel (German: Bauernkapelle; French: Chapelle des Humbles), which is now used as a parish church. The conventual buildings were somewhere to the left of the church.

== Bibliography ==
- Dosse, C. (1989): La Haute Vallée de la Canner - L’abbaye de Villers-Bettnach. Éditions Serpenoise
- Hotz, W. (1976): Handbuch der Kunstdenkmäler im Elsaß und in Lothringen, p 307. Munich and Berlin: Deutscher Kunstverlag. ISBN 3-422-00345-2
- Kilbertus, G. (2001): Villers-Bettnach - L’Abbaye. Talange: Self-published.
- Maguin, J., and Villard, Y. (2001): L’abbaye de Villers-Bettnach. Guidebook on sale at the abbey.
- Peugniez, Bernard (2002): Routier cistercien, p 236. Moisenay: Editions Gaud. ISBN 978-2-84080-044-6
- Philips, Jean-Paul (207): Patrimoine rural en Pays messin. Éditions Serpenoise.
- Trapp, Thomas (1996): Die Zisterzienserabtei Weiler-Bettnach im Hoch- und Spätmittelalter. Saarbrücken: Saarbrücker Druckerei und Verlag. ISBN 3-930843-13-7. (= Veröffentlichungen der Kommission für Saarländische Landesgeschichte und Volksforschung, Band 27)
- Volkelt, P., Van Hees, H. (1983): Reclams Kunstführer Frankreich, Band III, p 382. Stuttgart: Reclam. ISBN 3-15-010319-3
