= August Becker (disambiguation) =

August Becker (1900–1967) was an SS officer and chemist who helped design mobile gas chambers.

August Becker may also refer to:

- August Becker (socialist) (c. 1810–1875), German-American socialist
- August Becker (painter) (1821–1887), German painter
- August Becker (author) (1828–1891), German author
