= Viktring Abbey =

Former Cistercian monastery in Carinthia, Austria

Coordinates: 46°35′23″N 14°16′09″E

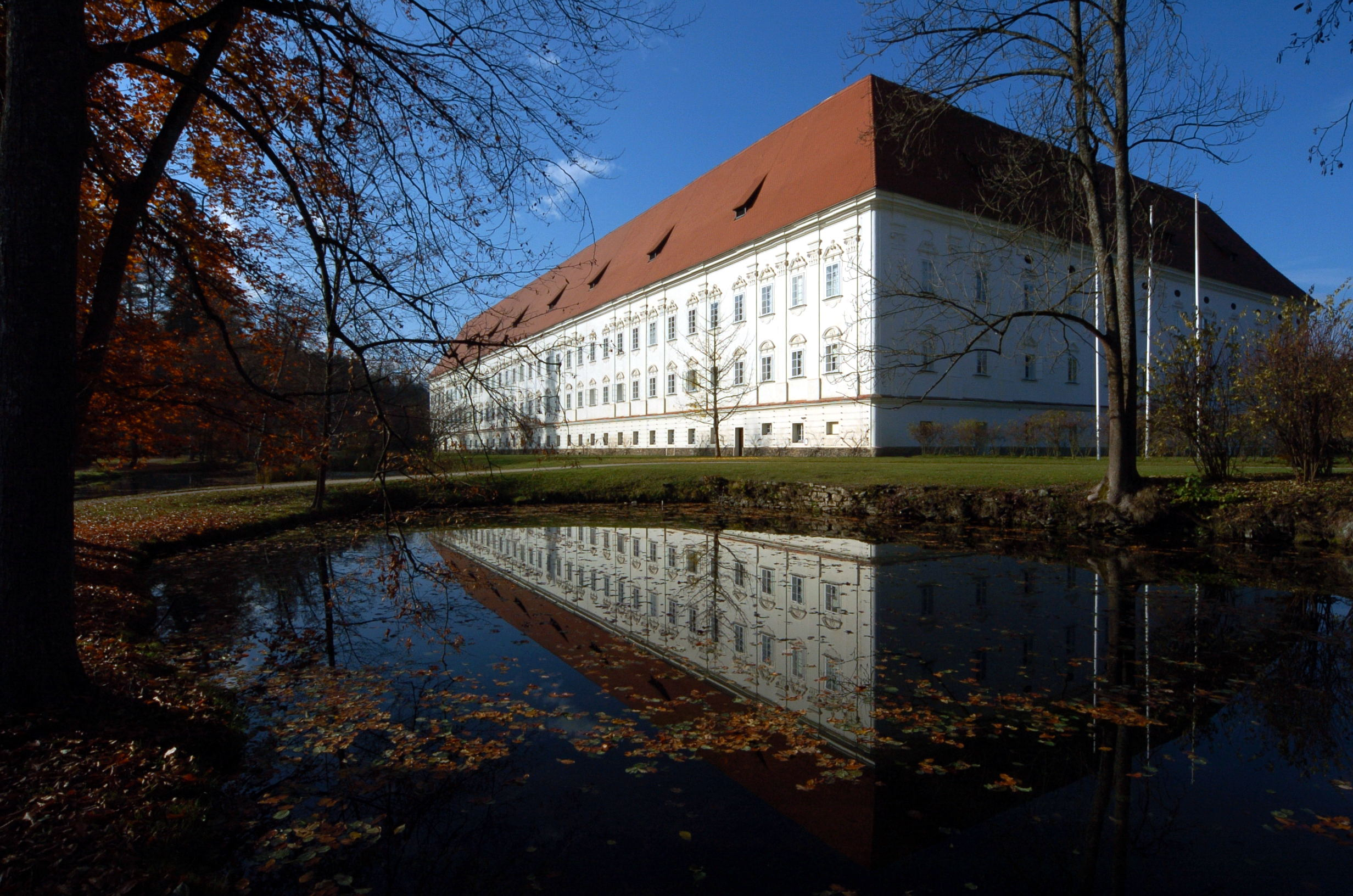
View of the former abbey

Viktring Abbey (German: Stift Viktring, Slovene: Opatija Vetrinj) is a former Cistercian monastery in the Austrian state of Carinthia. It is now a Roman Catholic parish, since 1973 a district of the Carinthian capital Klagenfurt.

== History ==
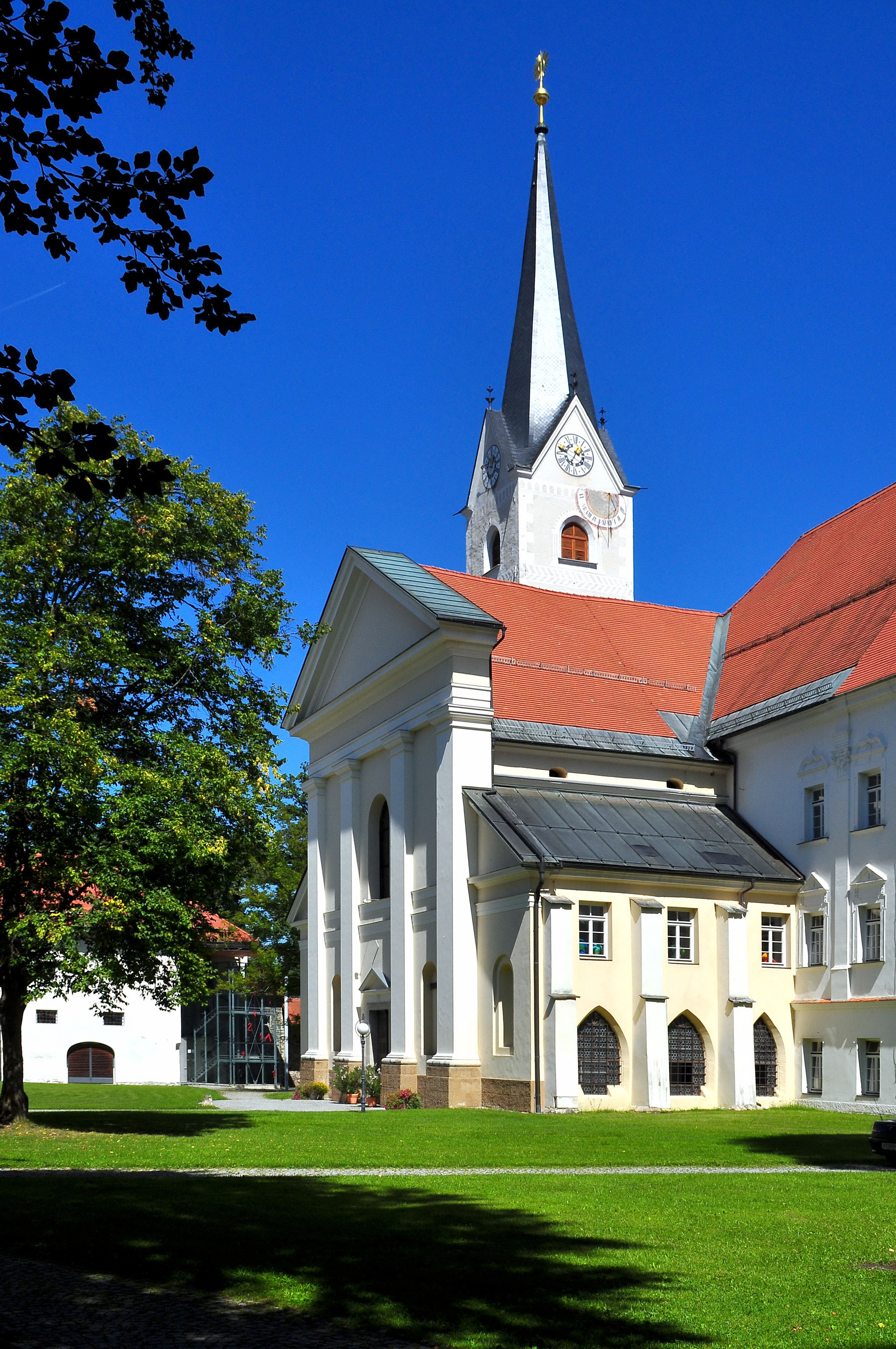
Former abbey church

Viktring Abbey was established in 1142 by Cistercian monks from Villers-Bettnach Abbey in the Duchy of Lorraine (in the modern Saint-Hubert), of the filiation of Morimond. Its lands were probably a gift of Count Bernhard of Spanheim-Marburg (Maribor), brother of Duke Engelbert of Carinthia, and his wife Kunigunde, daughter of Margrave Ottokar II of Styria. As early as 13 May in the following year the first abbot, Eberhard, was consecrated. The abbey church was dedicated 60 years later by Eberhard of Regensburg, Archbishop of Salzburg, in 1202.

In 1234 the Carinthian duke Bernhard von Spanheim founded Landstrass Abbey, latterly also known as Kostanjevica Abbey, a daughter house of Viktring in the March of Carniola, in the modern Kostanjevica in Slovenia.

The most notable abbot was the chronicler John of Viktring, confidant of Duke Henry of Bohemia, who assumed his office in 1312. Under Abbot Johannes II in 1411 the greater part of Viktring Abbey burnt down. Vigorous re-building in the abbey and the parishes belonging to it was however made possible by decree of the Cistercian General Chapter. In 1447 the German king Frederick III of Habsburg presented the abbey church with an altar.

Viktring Abbey was dissolved during the rationalist reforms of Emperor Joseph II by decree of 19 May 1786 and given the status of a parish. The parish retained possession only of the church and the former rectory.

== Moro Brothers textile factory ==
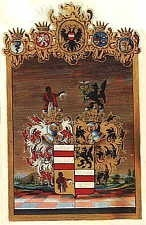
Arms of the Moro family, granted with the title of Ritter in 1820

Part of the premises and lands were bought at auction on 10 November 1788 by the brothers Johann and Christoph Moro, who set up a textile factory here. In 1796 they succeeded in acquiring a long lease of the lordship of Viktring. The rise of the firm "Gebrüder Moro" was spectacular; in 1816 the Austrian Emperor Francis I of Habsburg visited the factory with his wife Caroline Augusta of Bavaria. The firm painstakingly cultivated its connections to the Imperial family, and received further visits in 1850 and 1852 from Emperor Franz Joseph.

By 1897 the Moro family had acquired the entire monastery and its rights. In 1925 Adeline von Botka, the last surviving member of the family, sold the textile factory "Gebrüder Moro" to Baron Josef Aichelburg-Zosenegg. In 1942 he committed suicide, and the company was taken over by the "Hamburger Aero-Maschinen- und Werkzeugfabrik". In 1956 the Reichmann company acquired the concern, but went out of business ten years later.

In 1970 the Austrian government bought the buildings and set up a secondary school here in 1977, which in 1980 became independent as the "Realgymnasium unter besonderer Berücksichtigung der musischen Ausbildung". On 23 September 1999 the official opening of the BRG Klagenfurt-Viktring, well known for its specialisation in musical education, took place.
