= Jungfernsprung =

Rock formation in Germany

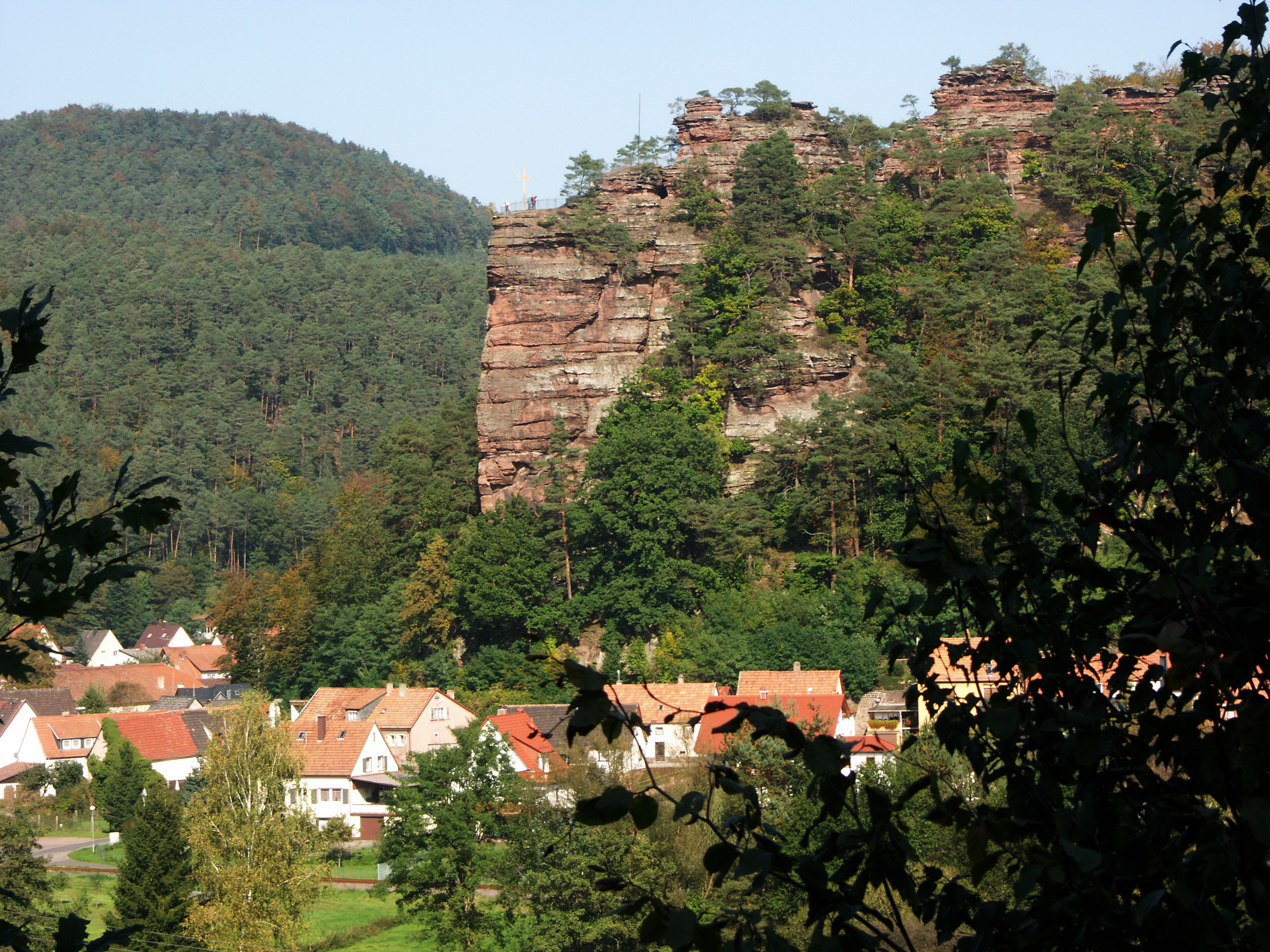
- The Jungfernsprung from the southwest

Highest point
- Elevation: 280 m above sea level (NHN) (920 ft)
- Coordinates: 49°09′11″N 7°46′27″E

Geography
- Location within Rhineland-Palatinate
- Location: Palatine Forest (Rhineland-Palatinate, Germany)
- Parent range: Wasgau

Geology
- Mountain type: Bunter sandstone

Climbing
- Normal route: signed hiking trail, part of the Felsenland Legend Trail

The Jungfernsprung, is a precipitous rock formation in the small German town of Dahn in the county of Südwestpfalz. The rocks tower above the town by around 70 metres and are crowned by a type of summit cross at a height of 280 m above NHN. The rocks is the symbol of the town and the subject of an ancient legend from which it derives its name: Jungfernsprung means "maiden's leap".

== Location and structure ==
The Jungfernsprung lies in the eastern part of the borough. Its west and north faces rise, steep and ruggedly, from the slopes on the left-hand side of the Wieslauter valley, whilst the residential area of Dahn spreads out southwest of the rocks on both sides of its base.

The rocks belong to the many bunter sandstone formations, typical of the Wasgau region, the southern part of the Palatine Forest in Germany and the northern part of the Vosges in France. Because the area around Dahn is especially rich in such rock features it is also called the Dahner Felsenland ("Dahn Rock Country"). The Jungfernsprung – like other rock formations in the region – is a harder rock that has withstood erosion better than the surrounding softer material.

== Legend of the Jungfernsprung ==
The legend, whose most common version comes from local author, August Becker (1857), goes like this:

Once a young maiden ventured into the Forest of Dahn to pick berries. When she was far away from home, a man suddenly burst out of the thicket, probably the robber baron, Hans Trapp from Berwartstein Castle. The man clearly intended to rob the virgin of her innocence. So the young maiden gathered up her skirts and took to flight, but the villain came ever closer to her. In her panic, the young lass failed to watch where she was going. All of a sudden she found herself, panting for breath, at the edge of the precipice with the houses of the town far below. Without stopping to think, the young maiden fell over the abyss. And now the miracle happened: because her skirts ballooned out and let her float down gently, she survived the leap entirely unhurt. And ever since, at the spot where her foot landed, a spring has flowed.

More about the fate of the maiden and villain is not recorded, however this story was sufficient for the time to explain the steepness of the rock and the existence of the spring.

Artists have occasionally been inspired to portray the dramatic "maiden's leap". In doing so they clearly always used the idea of someone parachuting as a model, the outspread skirts of the maiden enabling a visual interpretation of the miracle and at the same time representing an attractive artistic subject.

== Hiking destination and climbing rocks ==
The Jungfernsprung is accessible to hikers from the rear; the access footpath being part of the premier hiking trail, the Felsenland Legend Trail (Felsenland Sagenweg). In summer the rocks are part of the South Palatinate Climbing Area and thus a popular destination for sport climbers. The spectacular Franz Seiler Memorial Route (Franz-Seiler-Gedächtnisweg) rates as climbing grade VII+ (UIAA). it runs up the vertical face of the rock and is visible from the town.

== Literature ==
- August Becker (2005), Die Pfalz und die Pfälzer (in German) (7th ed.), Gräfenhausen: Plöger Medien, ISBN 978-3-89857-193-7 (topographical, cultural, historical monograph, reprint of the 1st edition of 1857)
