= Blieskastel =

- Town
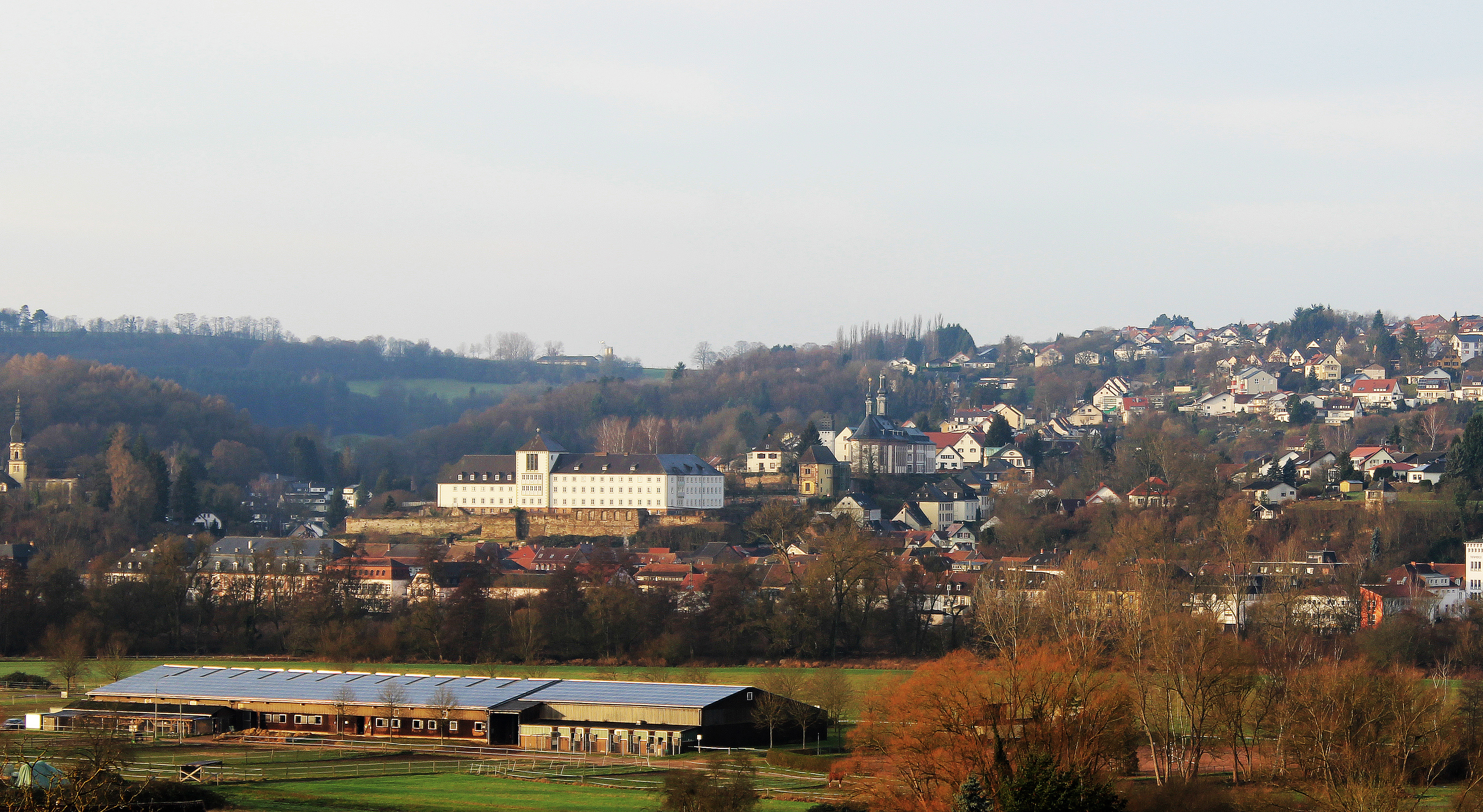
- View of Blieskastel center from Webenheim

- Flag Coat of arms

- Location of Blieskastel within Saarpfalz district
- Interactive map of Blieskastel
- Location within Germany Location within Saarland
- Coordinates: 49°14′N 7°15′E
- Country: Germany
- State: Saarland
- District: Saarpfalz

Government
  - Mayor (2019–29): Bernd Hertzler (SPD)

Area
  - Total: 108.21 km^{2} (41.78 sq mi)
- Elevation: 218 m (715 ft)

Population (2025-12-31)
  - Total: 19,935
  - Density: 184.23/km^{2} (477.14/sq mi)
- Time zone: UTC+01:00 (CET)
  - Summer (DST): UTC+02:00 (CEST)
- Postal codes: 66431–66440
- Dialling codes: 06842
- Vehicle registration: HOM
- Website: www.blieskastel.de

Blieskastel (German pronunciation: [ˌbliːsˈkastl̩] Palatine German: Kaschdel [ˈkaɕ.d̥l̩]) is a town in the Saarpfalz (Saar-Palatinate) district, in Saarland, Germany which is divided into villages. It is situated on the river Blies, approximately 10 kilometres (6 miles) southwest of Homburg (Saar), 8 km (5 mi) west of Zweibrücken, and 20 km (12 mi) east of Saarbrücken.

== Geography ==
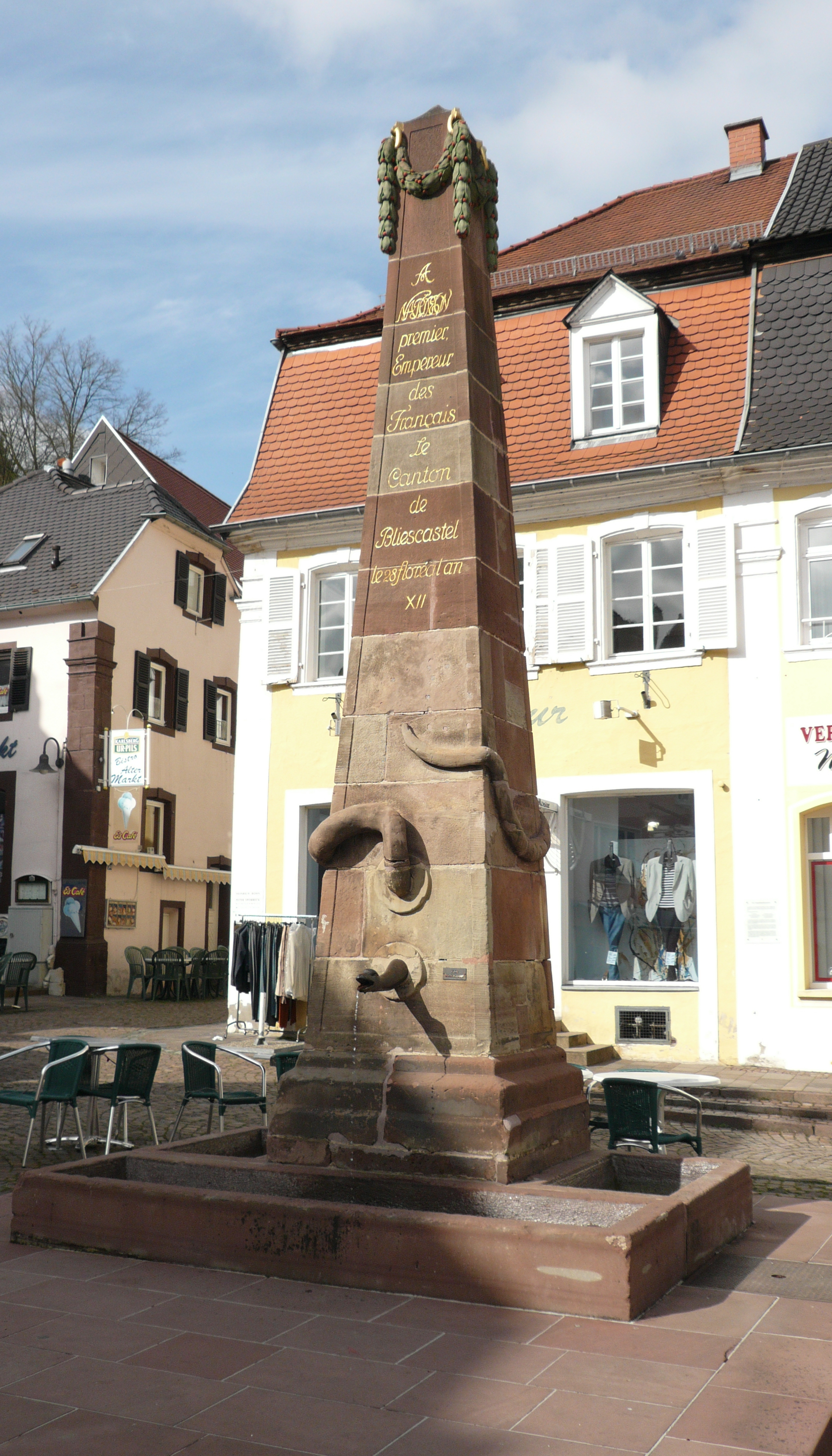
Napoleon's Fountain

Blieskastel is the capital of the Bliesgau and is located in the center of the Bliesgau Biosphere Reserve. The city borders on the cities of Homburg, St. Ingbert, Zweibrücken and Hornbach, and the municipalities of Gersheim, Kirkel and Mandelbachtal. The Blies flows by Blieskastel. The districts of Niederwürzbach, Lautzkirchen and Alschbach are located in the Sankt Ingbert-Kirkeler forest area.

=== Climate ===
The annual rainfall is 835 mm (32.9 in) and is in the upper third. 70% indicate low values. The driest month is April. It rains most in December.

== Organization ==
The city of Blieskastel consists of Blieskastel-Mitte and 14 districts. Alphabetically these are Altheim, Aßweiler, Ballweiler, Bierbach an der Blies, Biesingen, Blickweiler, Böckweiler, Breitfurt, Brenschelbach, Mimbach, Niederwürzbach, Pinningen, Webenheim, and Wolfersheim.

Blieskastel-Mitte is divided into the city center of Blieskastel, Alschbach, and Lautzkirchen. The district of Brenschelbach is divided into Brenschelbach, Brenschelbach-Bahnhof, and Riesweiler. To the district of Wecklingen is part of Ballweiler, and Seelbach of Niederwürzbach.

Number of inhabitants as of 31 December 2017:

District	Belongs to	Inhabitants
Alschbach	Blieskastel-Mitte	608
Altheim	Altheim	546
Aßweiler	Aßweiler	921
Ballweiler	Ballweiler	790
Bierbach	Bierbach	1,698
Biesingen	Biesingen	1,012
Blickweiler	Blickweiler	1,333
Blieskastel	Blieskastel-Mitte	2,705
Böckweiler	Böckweiler	348
Breitfurt	Breitfurt	1,157
Brenschelbach	Brenschelbach	521
Brenschelbach-Bahnhof	Brenschelbach	
Lautzkirchen	Blieskastel-Mitte	2,739
Mimbach	Mimbach	948
Niederwürzbach	Niederwürzbach	3,528
Pinningen	Pinningen	242
Riesweiler	Brenschelbach	
Seelbach	Niederwürzbach	243
Webenheim	Webenheim	1,173
Wecklingen	Ballweiler	206
Wolfersheim	Wolfersheim	441
Total		21,159

== History ==
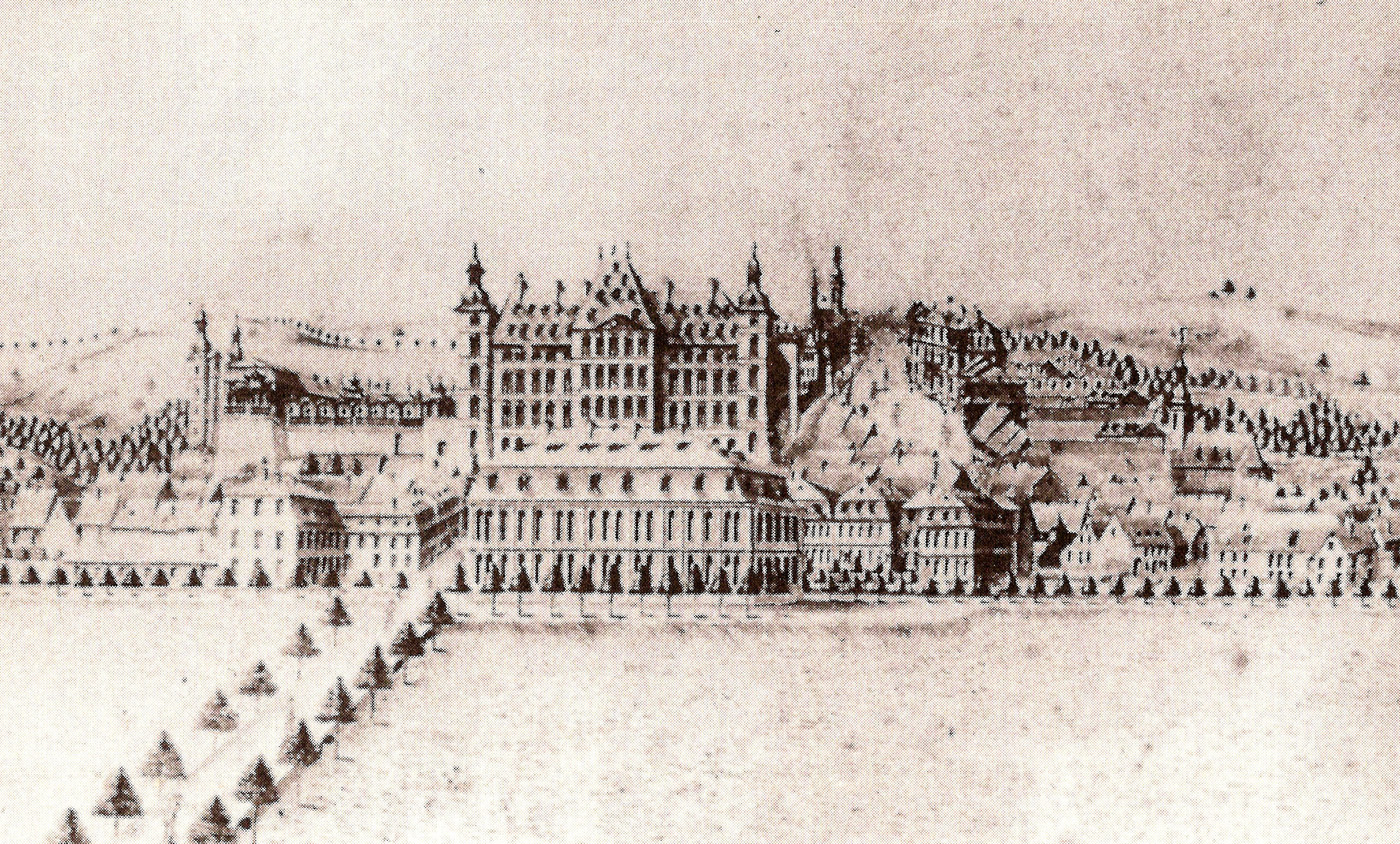
View Blieskastel, drawing by J.P. Bayer, 1779

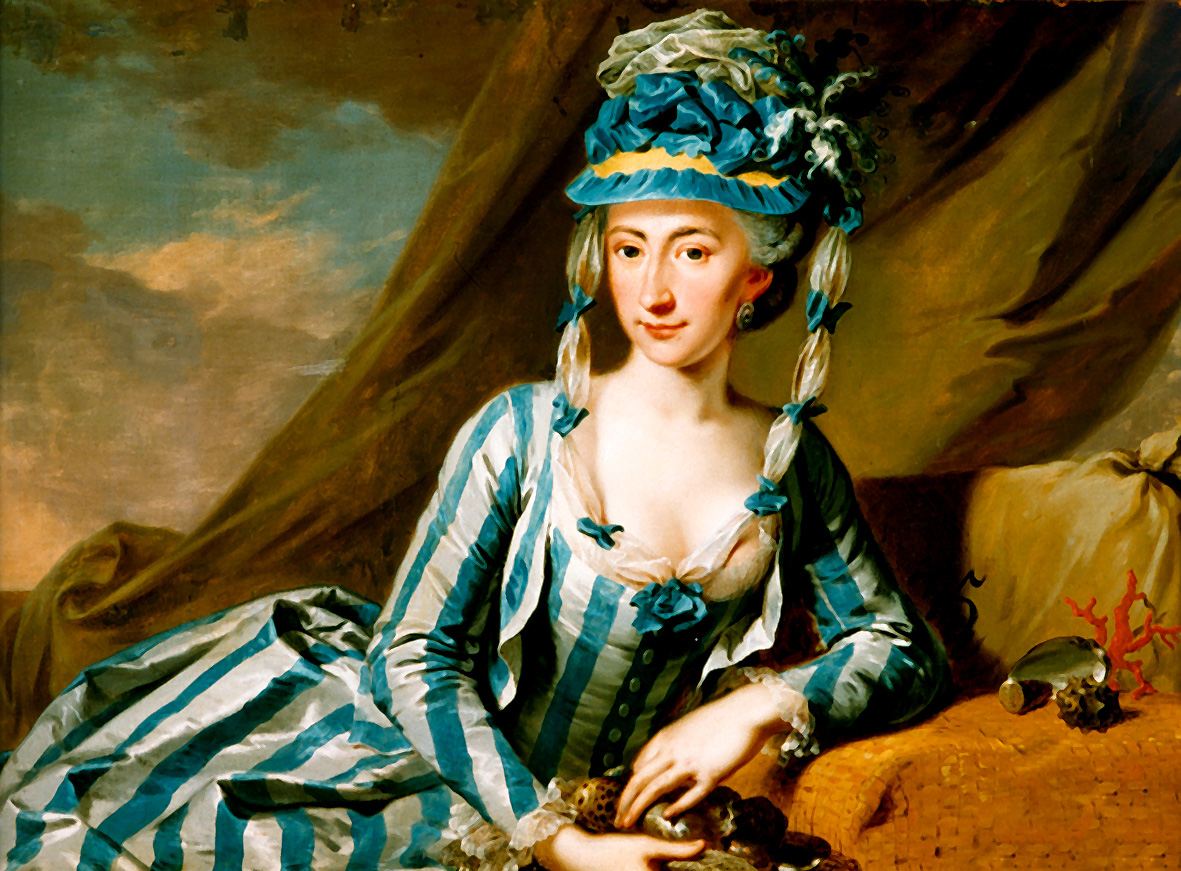
Marianne von der Leyen

The former castle of Blieskastel was the seat of the Counts of Blieskastel, whose line died out in 1237. The daughter of the last count, Elisabeth, donated the monastery Gräfinthal in Gräfinthal in 1234. Castle and lordship came into possession of the Counts of Salm, then in 1284 of Bishop Burkhard of Metz, who relocated there from Finstingen. After 1337 Blieskastel belonged to the Electorate of Trier. The counts of Veldenz are also counted among the officials of Trier. In 1440, the Elector of Trier, Jakob I, turned over half of the county and the "Hungericht" to the knight Friedrich von Loewenstein. In 1522 the castle was destroyed by Franz von Sickingen in his feud with the Elector of Trier. In 1553 the rule of Blieskastel was pledged to the counts of County of Nassau-Saarbrücken. In the Thirty Years' War Blieskastel was depopulated.

Around 1660, the imperial Freiherr von der Leyen, who had had possessions in Blieskastel since 1456, acquired the administration of Blieskastel from Trier and, in 1661–1676, built a new castle on the old site. In the 18th century under the Counts von der Leyen Blieskastel experienced a new flowering, as in 1773 they moved their residence from Koblenz to Blieskastel and built up Blieskastel as their seat. Under the regent Marianne von der Leyen a cultural center was established in Blieskastel. A period of brisk building activity followed. The palace was further expanded and on the Schlossberg there were a number of outstanding palaces and mansions for the court officials of the small court, including the so-called "Schlößchen", attributed to the Zweibrücken building director and architect Christian Ludwig Hautt. In addition, other master builders worked there, such as A. G. F. Guillemard, Matthias Weysser, Peter Reheis and the master carpenter Franz Schmitt. During this time the former Franciscan monastery church, the former orphanage and the government building were built.

With the French Revolution, the von der Leyen were expelled in 1793, their palace plundered and subsequently destroyed. The ruins were removed in 1802. In 1795 Blieskastel, like the entire left bank of the Rhine, came under French rule, and in 1798 was the capital of the canton of Blieskastel in the Sarre Department.

With the defeat of France in 1814, the area belonging to France west of the Rhine came first to the Generalgouvernement Mittelrhein. The canton of Blieskastel was placed under the joint Austro-Bavarian State Administration Commission after 1814. In 1816 Austria and Bavaria concluded an exchange agreement, after which the Rheinkreis, the later Bavarian Palatinate, was assigned to kingdom of Bavaria. The canton of Blieskastel was subordinated to the district administration in Zweibrücken, and, in 1818, came to the Landkommissariat Zweibrücken, and in 1902 to the newly formed district office Sankt Ingbert.

From 1920 to 1935 Blieskastel belonged to the Territory of the Saar Basin (Saargebiet), which was put under French administration by a mandate of the League of Nations for 15 years. In the Nazi era Blieskastel was governed from Saarbrücken, until 1935 as part of Pfalz-Saar, until 1940 as part of the Saarpfalz and until the end of the war together with Lorraine as "Westmark". After the Second World War, the city of Blieskastel was initially in the French occupation zone and from 1947 to 1956 in the partly autonomous Saarland, which, after rejection of the second Saar statute on January 1, 1957, became a federal state of the Federal Republic of Germany.

As part of a territorial and administrative reform of 1974, Blieskastel, which until then belonged to the district of Sankt Ingbert, became part of the newly created Saar-Pfalz-Kreis (now Saarpfalz-Kreis). At the same time, the city Blieskastel was extended to surrounding communities.

Blieskastel has been an officially-recognized Kneipp spa resort since 1978.

== Culture and points of interest ==
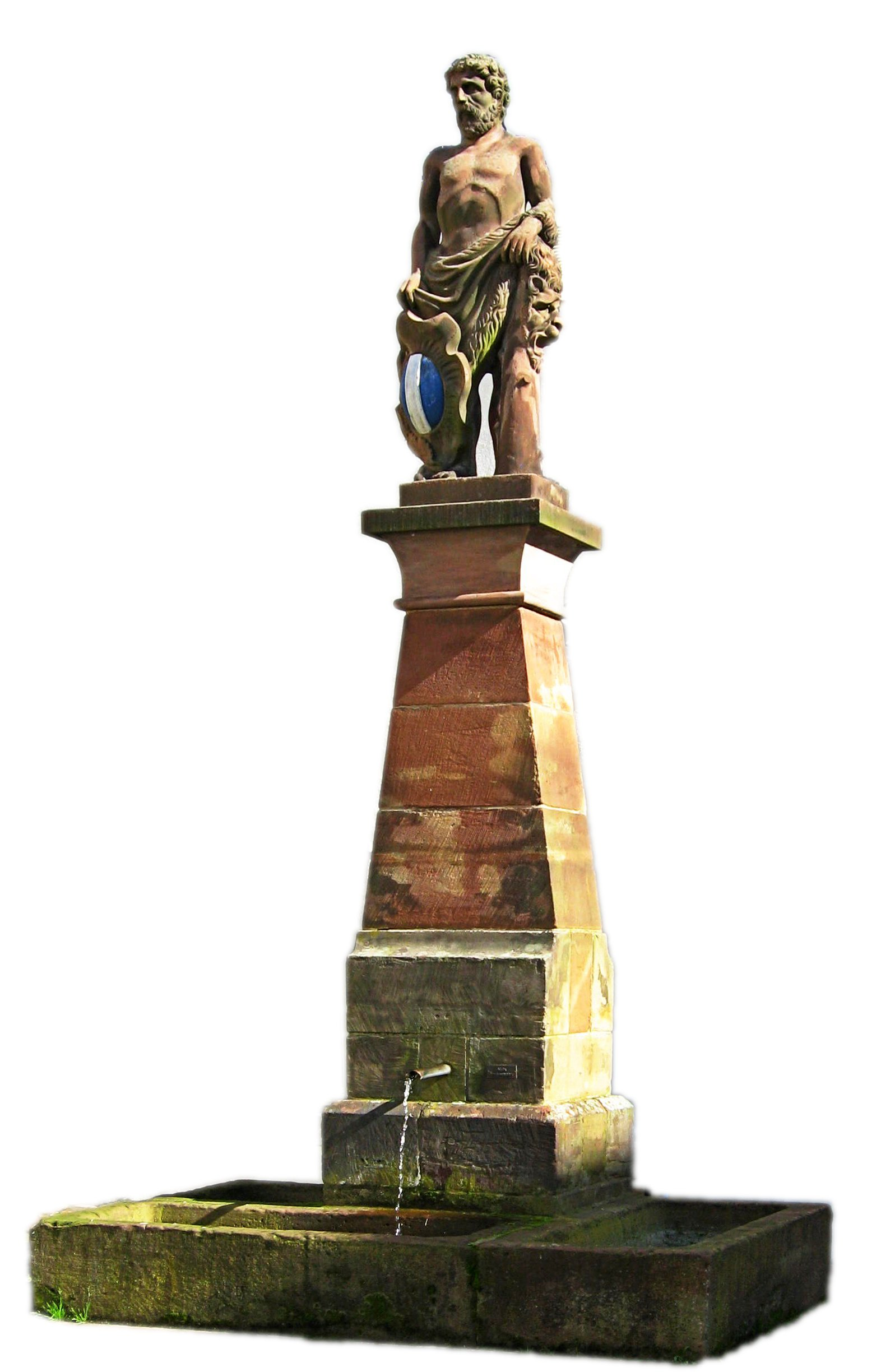
The Hercules Fountain

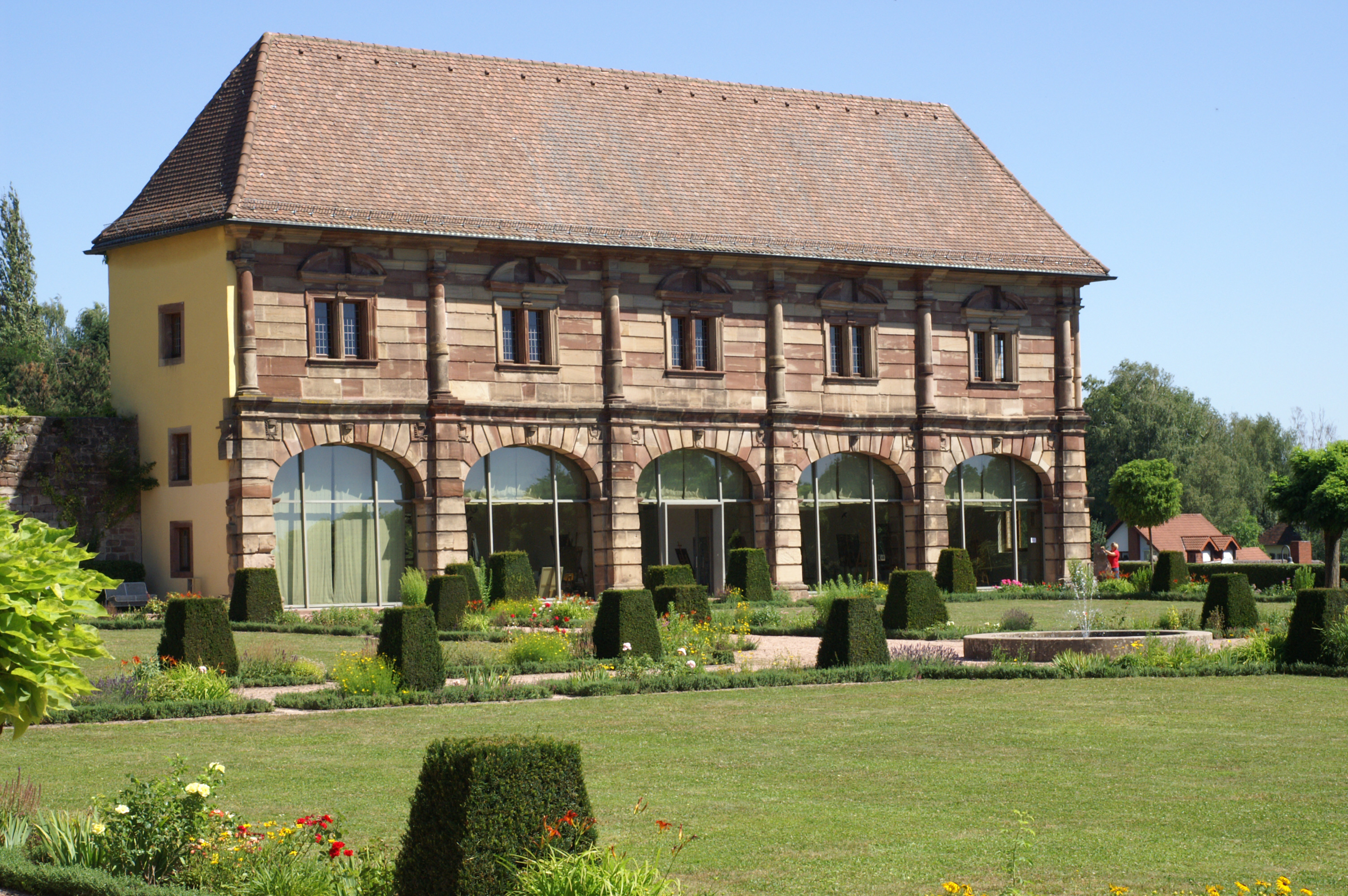
The Orangerie

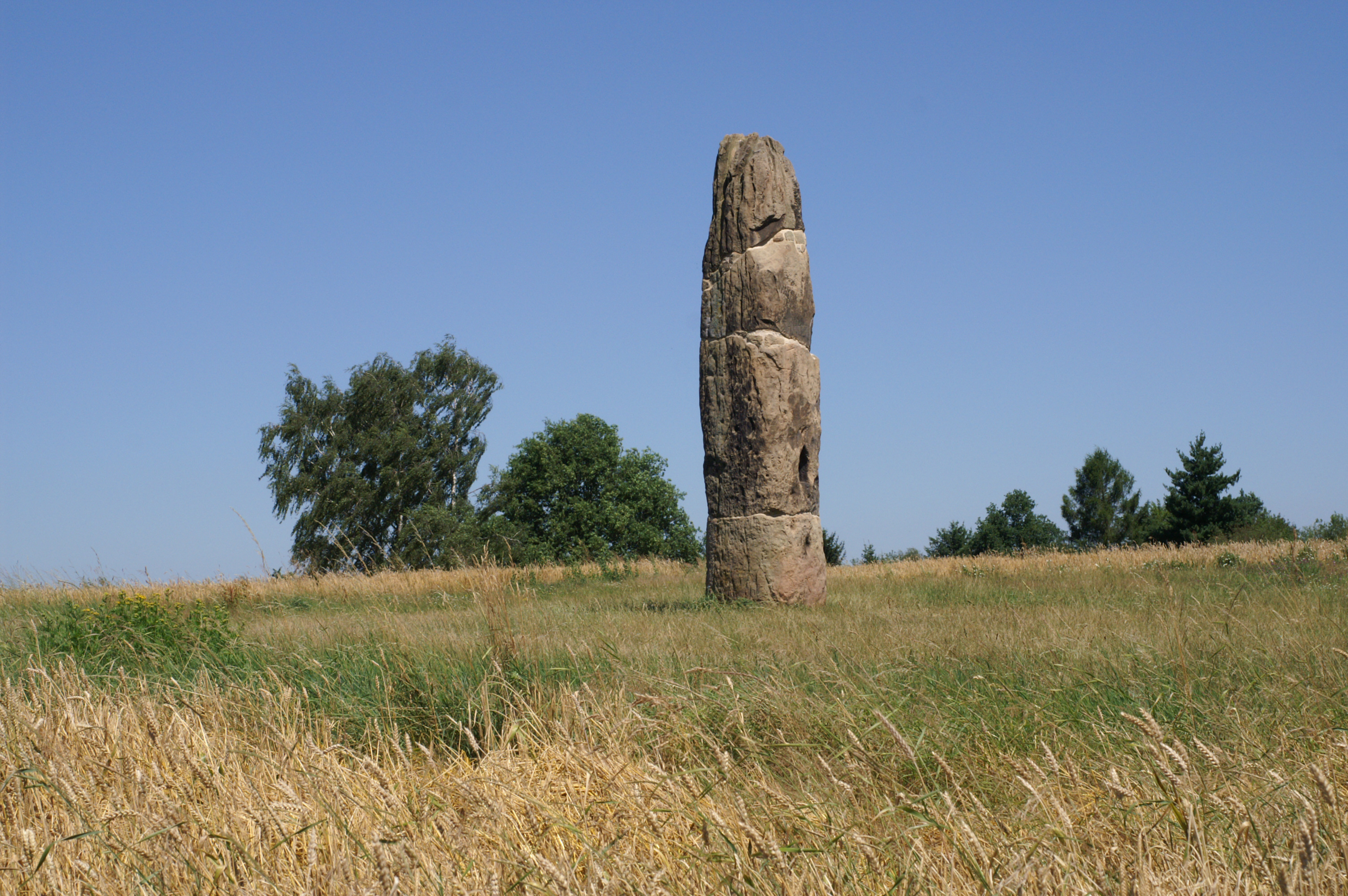
The Gollenstein

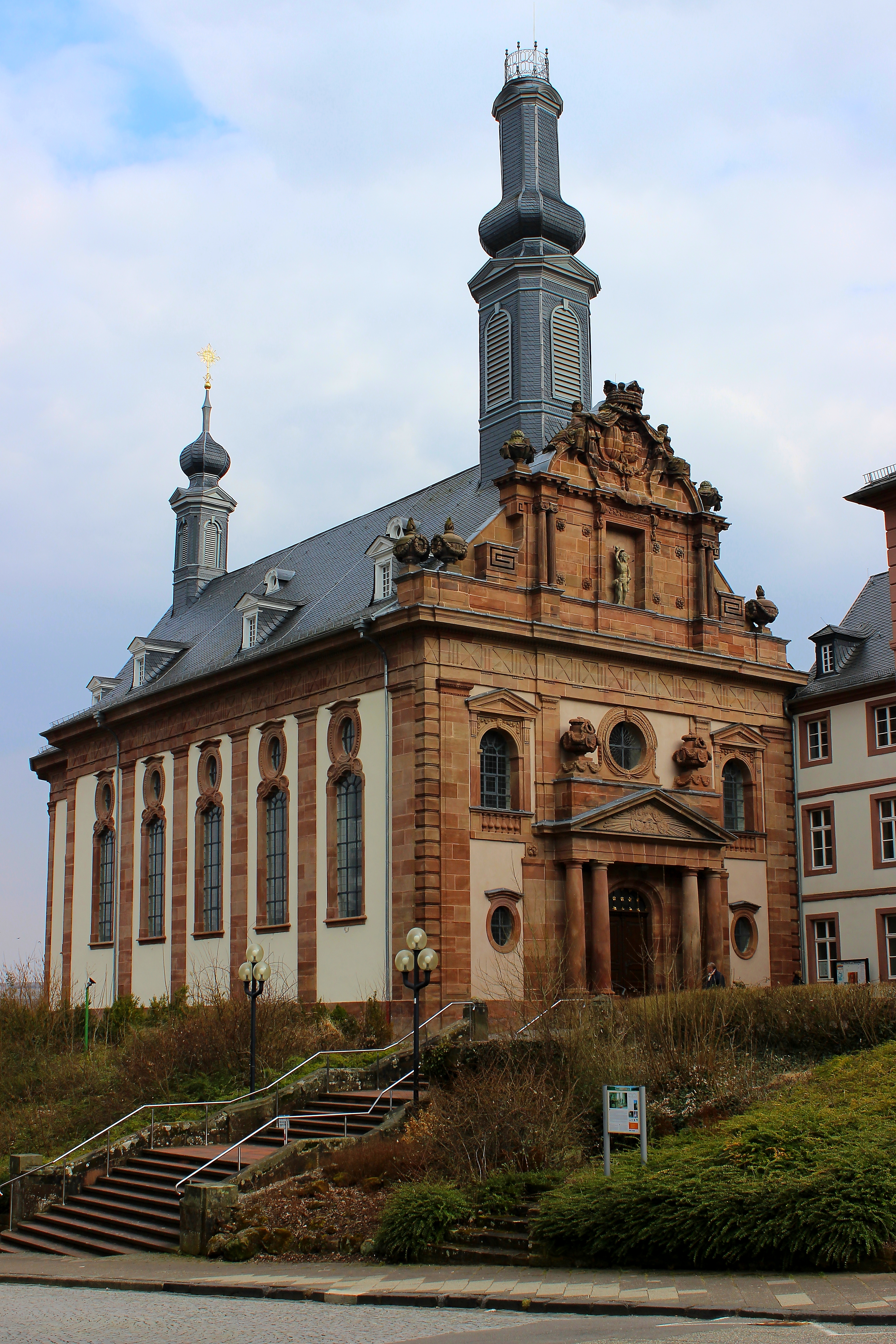
The Schlosskirche

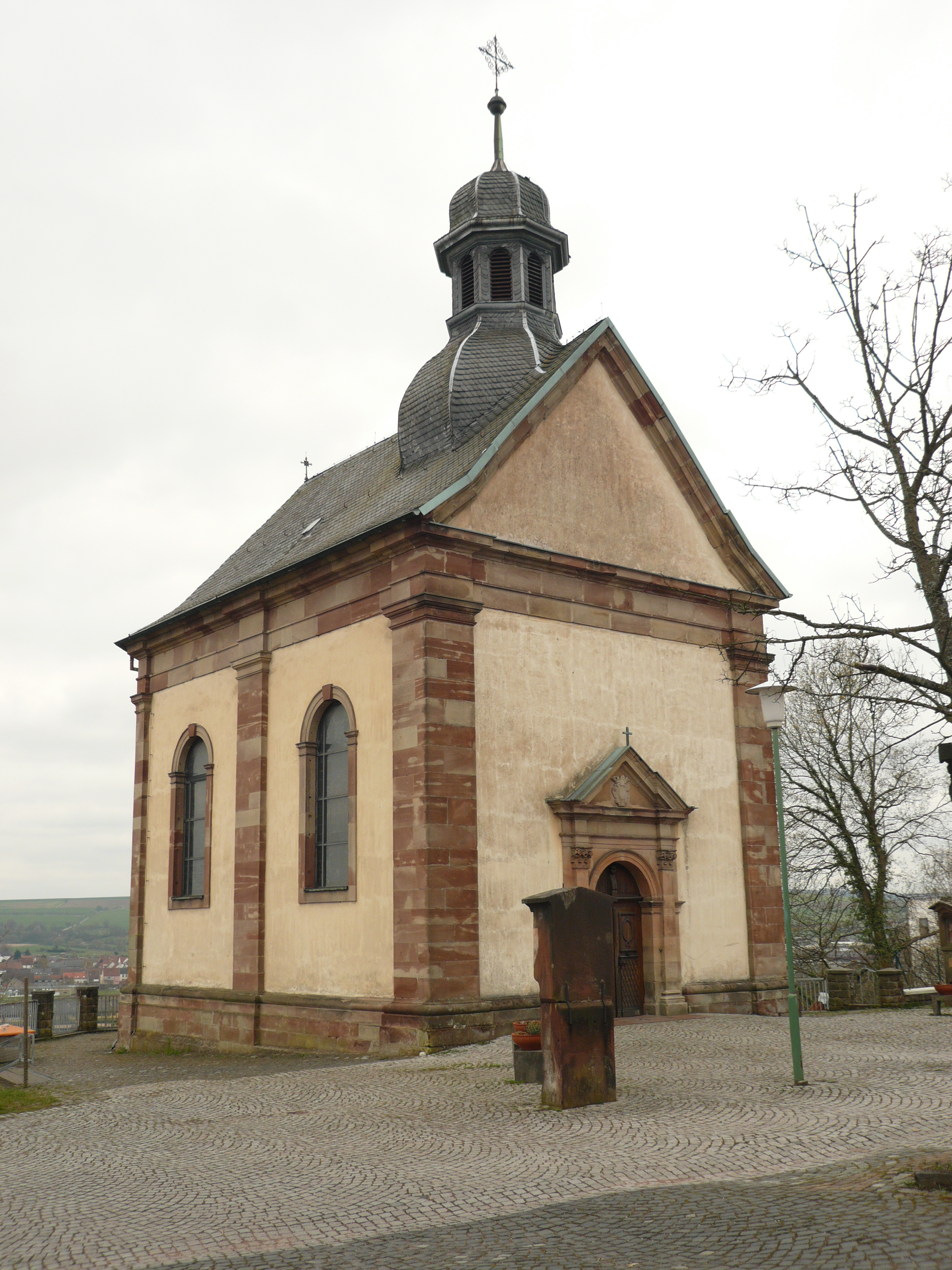
The Holy Cross Church

=== Attractions ===
The historic city center with the Blieskastel Town Hall (built in the 18th century as a government building and orphanage), the Hercules Fountain of 1691 and the Napoleon Fountain ("Schlangenbrunnen"–Snake Fountain) from 1804, is largely in the Baroque style, which also includes the houses of the court officials on the Schlossberg. These, especially the so-called "Schlößchen" of 1776/77, are the work of the Zweibrücken building director Christian Ludwig Hautt. Altogether, the historic area of Old Blieskastel comprises 133 individual monuments and a further 65 buildings under ensemble protection. The city is located on the SaarPfalz Baroque Route.

Above the city once stood the castle, which was largely destroyed during the French Revolution. Only the 17th century "Orangerie" was preserved. The building originally had twelve arches, and was restored from 1982 to 1986 and is used for lectures, exhibitions and concerts.

West of the former castle grounds is the former monastery church of Franciscan Recollects, built from 1776 to 1778 and today a Catholic parish church. From 1778 to 1793 the church filled the role of a "castle church" and is now colloquially known as the "Schlosskirche". The church was designed by a Franciscan builder named Minder, the construction was led by the Count's Inspector Peter Reheis.

Further north on the "Han" is the pilgrimage monastery of Blieskastel, supervised since 2005 by the Franciscan Minorites.

In the Holy Cross Chapel at the pilgrimage monastery there is, since 1827, a baroque painting of "Our Lady with the Arrows", which was transferred in 1786 from Gräfinthal to Blieskastel. This image is a unique 14th-century pietà (vesper image), in which there are five iron medieval arrowheads. According to legend the arrows were shot in by sinners. The chapel, in which a relic of the True Cross was originally venerated, dates from 1682/83.

On a southern hill is a neo-baroque Protestant church built in 1912.

The landmark of the city is the 4000 year old Gollenstein, which is considered to be the largest menhir in Central Europe at 6.5 metres (21 ft). It stands on the ridge at Blieskastel.

== Twin towns – sister cities ==
Blieskastel is twinned with:

- Le Creusot, France (1989)
- Castellabate, Italy (2008)

== Notable people ==
- Andreas Öchsner (born 1970), professor, head of discipline, in mechanical engineering at Griffith University
- David Oppenheimer (1834–1897), entrepreneur and mayor of Vancouver
- Jutta Schmitt-Lang (born 1982), politician
- Joseph Wendel (1901–1960), archbishop and cardinal
