= Eusserthal Abbey =

Coordinates: 49°14′30″N 7°58′13″E

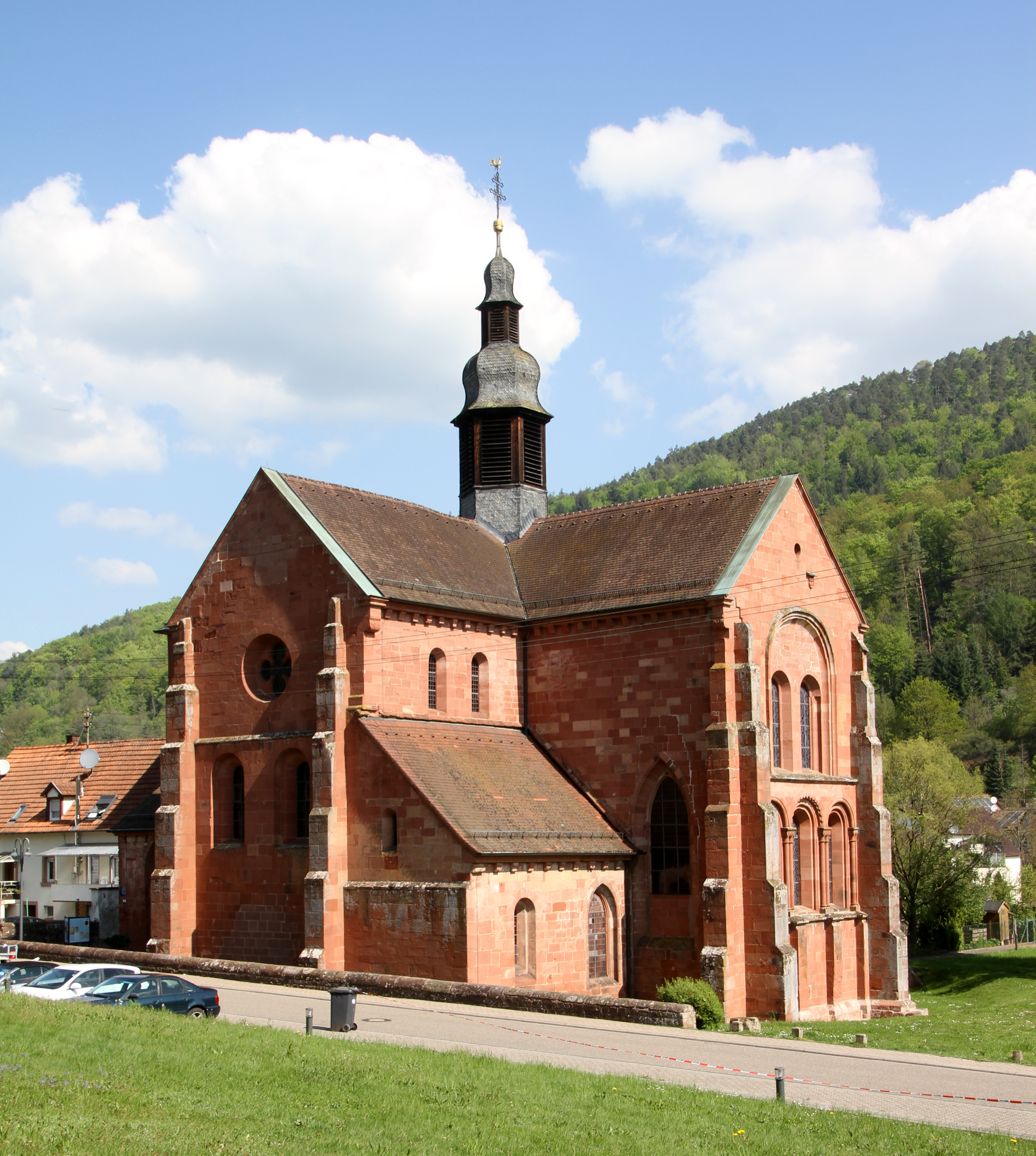
Eusserthal: the former abbey church, now the parish church

Eusserthal Abbey (German: Kloster Eußerthal) was a Cistercian abbey in Eusserthal near Annweiler am Trifels in the Rhineland-Palatinate, Germany. All that now remains of it is the front portion of the abbey church, which is now used as a parish church.

== History ==
The abbey was founded in 1148 by a knight, Stephan of Mörlheim, and settled by twelve Cistercian monks from Villers-Bettnach Abbey in Lorraine (of the filiation of Morimond). The monks' first task was the clearing of the river valley, to make it cultivable. In 1186 Emperor Frederick Barbarossa put the monastery under Imperial protection. It subsequently received rich gifts, including many vineyards in the south of the Palatinate. A village quickly grew up round the monastery.

The monks served at Trifels Castle as chaplains, and watched over the Imperial Regalia while they were kept in the castle during the 12th and 13th centuries. Eusserthal never founded any daughter houses, but it had a priory at Mörlheim.

After that the importance of the abbey declined. In the 15th century it was looted several times. In 1525, during the German Peasants' War, it was looted and set on fire; it was rebuilt in 1552 under Abbot Martin II. In 1561 Elector Frederick III dissolved the abbey in consequence of the Reformation.

In the 17th and 18th centuries several attempts were made to revive the monastery, but without success.

== Church building ==
The building of the church is thought to have been begun about 1220; it was dedicated in 1262. The plan and basic structure are Romanesque but the vaulting shows Early Gothic influence. In accordance with Cistercian custom the church has no towers, just a flèche, or miniature spire, over the crossing, and the interior is without colour. The construction is of local red sandstone. The structure is of a pillared basilica of three aisles and a transept on a Latin cross ground plan. The vaults in the nave and the choir are secured by open buttresses. The resemblance to the church of Otterberg Abbey, which was built earlier, is unmistakable, although the church at Otterberg is larger.

The conventual buildings and the cloisters have disappeared, and of the church there now remain only the choir, the transept and the first bay of the nave. In the wall of the choir is a rose window with tracery, and over the arch of a door a well-preserved relief sculpture of a dragon in sandstone.

In the 18th century the remains of the abbey church were re-worked as a parish church. At that time the upper window openings were closed and the ruins of the bulk of the nave were demolished, and replaced by a simple west front. The acoustics of the resulting building are ideal for the performance of church music, and the summer concerts held here are well-known.

In 1961 substantial restorations took place, which have had the effect of emphasizing the Romanesque character of the structure.

== Sources ==
- Feldhaus, Heribert (2008): Das ehemalige Zisterzienserkloster Eusserthal. Imhof Petersberg ISBN 3-86568-255-3
