= Heilig-Kreuz-Kapelle (Blieskastel) =

Chapel in Blieskastel, Germany

Coordinates: 49°14′29″N 7°15′32″E

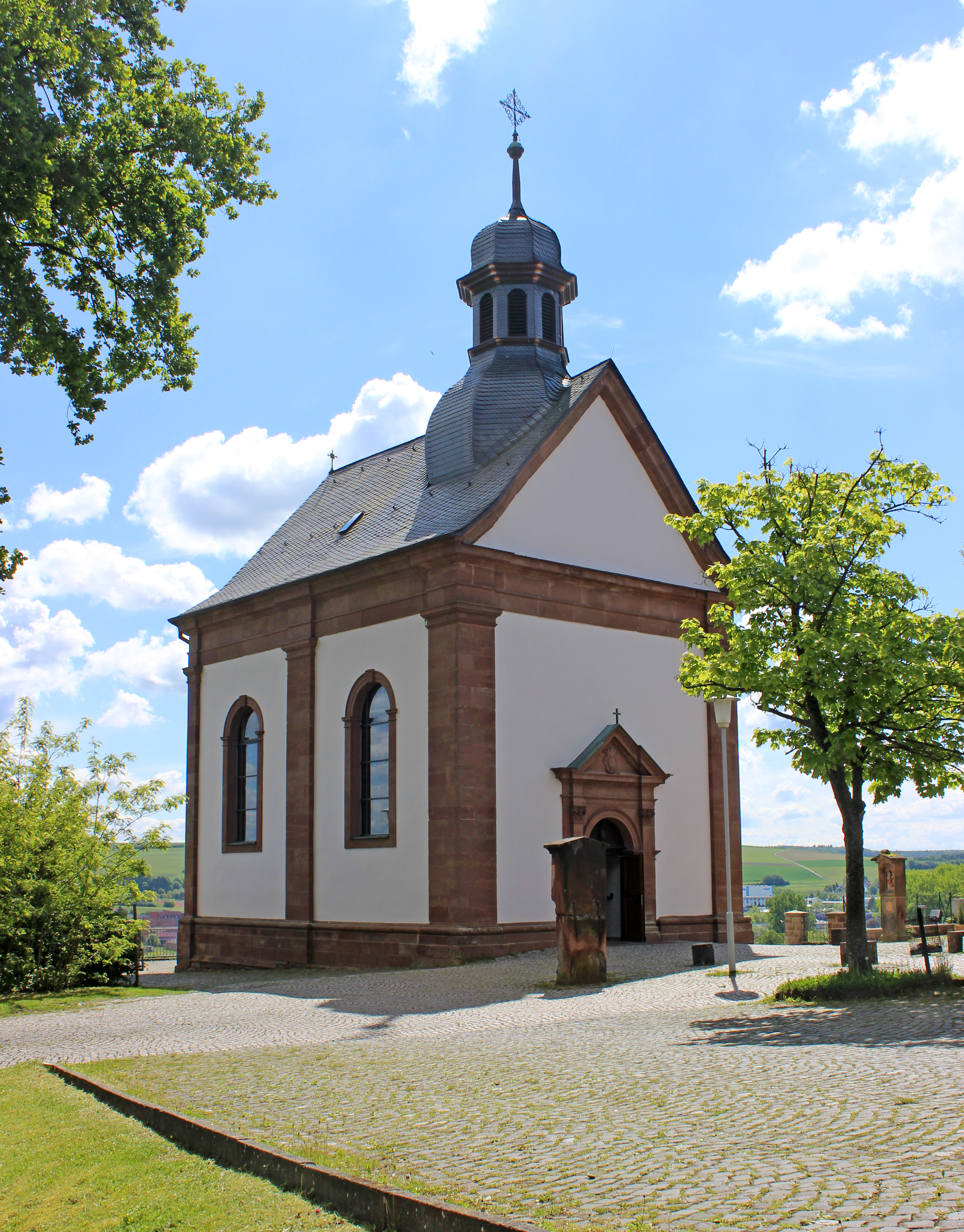
Heilig-Kreuz-Kapelle – looking towards Blieskastel

The Holy Cross Chapel (German: Heilig-Kreuz-Kapelle), also known as the Gnadenkapelle, is located on the Han ("Hain") above Blieskastel in Saarland. As a place of pilgrimage, it belongs to the Blieskastel Monastery, built in 1929, and is visited by around 80,000 pilgrims annually. The chapel was built as a place of veneration for a relic of the True Cross, but today it is closely related to the 14th century Pietà "Our Lady with the Arrows". In the list of monuments of the Saarland, the chapel is listed as an individual monument within the ensemble of the monastery complex "Auf dem Han".

== History ==
The present chapel, which replaced a smaller previous building, was probably built between 1682 and 1683 according to plans by Thomas Gampfer or "Camper". Local official Johann Simon Rosinus was responsible for the construction supervision.

The patrons for the chapel's construction were the barons Carl Caspar and Damian Adolph von der Leyen, who had moved their residence from Blieskastel to Koblenz a few years earlier. According to the dedication inscription, the church was to serve "(f)or the increased sewing of Christian-Catholic thought amongst the subjects." The chapel had a relic of the True Cross that generated many pilgrimages and which also became the namesake of the chapel. Long before the arrival of the “Arrow Madonna” from the Gräfinthal monastery, the Holy Cross Chapel was a regionally important pilgrimage site. The priest and royal visitator Carl Desiderius de Royer, reorganizer of Catholic life in the Duchy of Palatine Zweibrücken, published a booklet on this pilgrimage in 1692.

In the course of the French Revolution, the church was desecrated in 1793 and pilgrimages came to a standstill. The new revolutionary owners temporarily used it as a guard room and powder magazine. Ultimately, the chapel was reconsecrated in 1804, and regular services resumed. A quarter century later in 1829, the famous votive picture "Our Lady with the Arrows" arrived at the chapel from the Gräfinthal monastery. Pilgrimage to the chapel was revived in 1913 - this time with a focus on the votive image of the Madonna. Since that time, the little church has been one of the most famous pilgrimage sites in the Roman Catholic Diocese of Speyer.

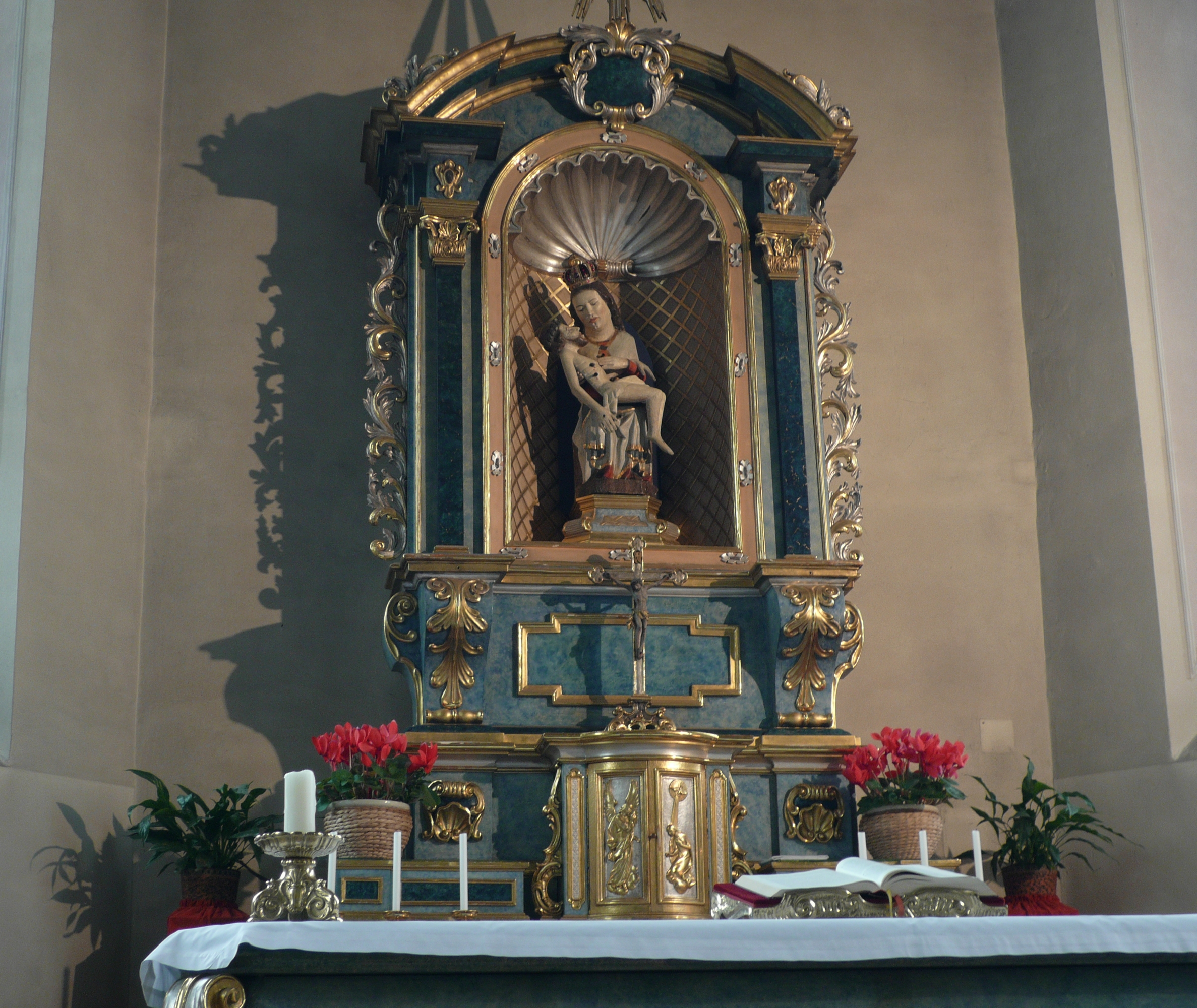
Votive Madonna Image: "Our Lady with the Arrows"

The first restoration of the chapel was carried out in 1958, which led to the discovery of a ribbed vault that was fully uncovered and painted in its original colors from 1965–66. The chapel roof was restored in 2008–09, however, further building work was urgently required.

Meanwhile, the Capuchins, who worked here until 2005, have been replaced by Franciscans who are tenants in the monastery complex after founding a monastery foundation. The Catholic Cross Chapel Association, a recognized non-profit founded in December 2007, is responsible for maintaining the building's condition.

The interior renovation of the chapel began on 16 May 2013. The chapel was ceremoniously reopened by the auxiliary bishop Otto Georgens of Speyer on 1 December 2013.

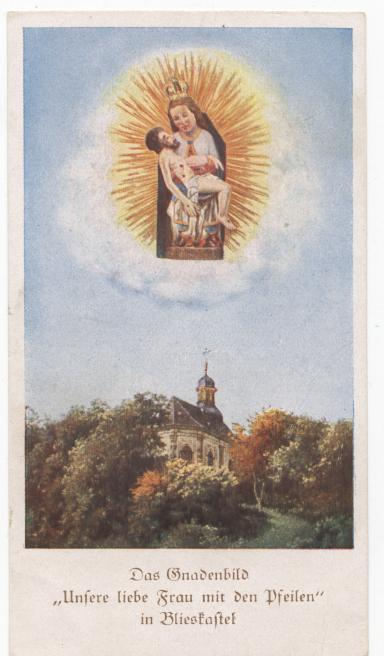
Pilgrimage memento from 1920 depicting Our Lady of Arrows and the chapel from the choir side

== Church organ ==
In a corner next to the chapel's entrance is an organ built in 1972 by the organ maker firm Hugo Mayer (Heusweiler). The instrument has 5 registers and a free-standing organ console.
