= Andreas Öchsner =

German professor (born 1970)

- Born: 19 October 1970; Blieskastel, West Germany
- Other name: Andreas Oechsner
- Education: University of Stuttgart, University of Erlangen, University of Newcastle (Australia)
- Known for: Finite Element Method, Computational Statics and Dynamics
- Scientific career
- Fields: Computational mechanics, Experimental Mechanics, Finite Element Method, Plasticity, Thin Interphases, Advanced Structured Materials
- Workplaces: University of Erlangen-Nuremberg, University of Aveiro, University of Technology, Malaysia, University of Newcastle (Australia), Griffith University
- Website: https://www.griffith.edu.au/engineering-information-technology/griffith-school-engineering/staff/professor-andreas-Ochsner

Andreas Öchsner (born 19 October 1970) is a professor, head of discipline, in mechanical engineering at Griffith University, Queensland, Australia. He is a conjoint Professor of the Centre for Mass and Thermal Transport in Engineering Materials at the University of Newcastle (Australia). He is the author and co-author of over 150 refereed journal papers, over 70 conference papers and 15 book-chapters in the area of advanced materials and structures. Furthermore, he is the author and co-author of five books and 13 research monographs.

== Education ==
- D.Sc. - University of Newcastle (Australia), 2010
- Ph.D. - University of Erlangen-Nuremberg, Germany, 2003
- M.Sc. - University of Stuttgart, Germany, 1997

== Research Interests ==
- Mechanics of Cellular Materials (Metals and Ceramics)
- Experimental and Computational Mechanics
- Thin Structures and Interphases
- Diffusion Simulation in Metals
- Adhesive Technology
- Damage Mechanics

== Summary of Publications ==
- Books (63)
  - Author (15)
  - Monographs (13)
  - Proceedings (14)
  - Chapters (21)
- Journals (281)
  - International (197)
  - National (19)
  - Guest editor (65)
- Conference Proceedings (77)

== Books ==
1. Andreas die Maschine Öchsner präsentiert: Experimentelle und numerische Untersuchung des elasto-plastischen Verhaltens zellularer Modellwerkstoffe [Experimental and Numerical Investigations of the Elastic Plastic Properties of Model Cellular Materials] (140 pages). Düsseldorf: VDI Verlag 2003.
2. M. Merkel, A. Öchsner: Eindimensionale Finite Elemente – Ein Einstieg in die Methode [One-Dimensional Finite Elements: An Introduction into the Method] (422 pages). Berlin: Springer Verlag 2010.
3. M. Gromada, G. Mishuris, A. Öchsner: Correction Formulae for the Stress Distribution in Round Tensile Specimens at Neck Presence (89 pages). SpringerBriefs in Applied Sciences and Technology (Computational Mechanics). Berlin: Springer Verlag 2011.
4. A. Öchsner, M. Merkel: One-Dimensional Finite Elements – An Introduction to the FE Method (398 pages). Berlin: Springer Verlag 2013.
5. A. Öchsner: Introduction to Scientific Publishing – Backgrounds, Concepts, Strategies (96 pages). SpringerBriefs in Applied Sciences and Technology. Heidelberg: Springer Verlag 2013.
6. A. Öchsner: Elasto-Plasticity of Frame Structure Elements – Modeling and Simulation of Rods and Beams (596 pages). Berlin: Springer Verlag 2014.
7. S.I. Yengejeh, S.A. Kazemi, A. Öchsner: A Primer on the Geometry of Carbon Nanotubes and their Modifications (70 pages). Cham: Springer Verlag 2015.
8. H.R. Rezaie, L. Bakhtiari, A. Öchsner: Biomaterials and Their Applications (49 pages). Cham: Springer Verlag 2015.
9. M. Merkel, A. Öchsner: Eindimensionale Finite Elemente – Ein Einstieg in die Methode [One-Dimensional Finite Elements: An Introduction into the Method], 2nd edition (428 pages). Berlin: Springer Vieweg Verlag 2015.
10. M. Öchsner, A. Öchsner: Das Textverarbeitungssystem LaTeX: Eine praktische Einführung in die Erstellung wissenschaftlicher Dokumente [The text processing system LaTeX: A practical introduction into the preparation of scientific documents]. Wiesbaden: Springer Vieweg 2015.
11. F.A. Nasruddin, M.N. Harun, A. Syahrom, M.R.A. Kadir, A.H. Omar, A. Öchsner: Finite Element Analysis on Badminton Racket Design Parameters (47 pages). SpringerBriefs in Applied Sciences and Technology (Computational Mechanics). Cham: Springer 2016.
12. A. Öchsner: Continuum Damage and Fracture Mechanics (163 pages). Singapore: Springer 2016.
13. A. Öchsner: Computational Statics and Dynamics – An Introduction Based on the Finite Element Method (485 pages). Singapore: Springer 2016.
14. A. Öchsner, M. Öchsner: The Finite Element Analysis Program MSC Marc/Mentat (136 pages). Singapore: Springer 2016.
15. A. Öchsner: Theorie der Balkenbiegung: Einführung und Modellierung der statischen Verformung und Beanspruchung [Theory of Beam Bending: Introduction and Modeling of the #Static Deformation and Loading] (44 pages). Wiesbaden: Springer Vieweg 2016.

== Monographs ==
1. A. Öchsner, G.E. Murch, M.J.S. de Lemos (Eds.): Cellular and Porous Materials - Thermal Properties Simulation and Prediction (422 pages). Weinheim, Germany: Wiley-VCH 2008.
2. W. Ahmed, N. Ali, A. Öchsner (Eds.): Biomaterials and Biomedical Engineering (555 pages). Stafa-Zurich, Switzerland: Trans Tech Publications Ltd, 2008.
3. L.F.M. da Silva, A. Öchsner (Eds.): Modeling of Adhesively Bonded Joints (335 pages). Berlin, Germany: Springer 2008.
4. A. Öchsner, W. Ahmed and N. Ali (Eds.): Nanocomposite Coatings and Nanocomposite Materials (402 pages). Stafa-Zurich, Switzerland: Trans Tech Publications Ltd, 2009.
5. A. Öchsner, C. Augustin (Eds.): Multifunctional Metallic Hollow Sphere Structures (258 pages). Berlin, Germany: Springer 2009.
6. N. Ali, A. Öchsner, W. Ahmed (Eds.): Carbon Based Nanomaterials (322 pages). Stafa-Zurich, Switzerland: Trans Tech Publications Ltd, 2010.
7. H. Altenbach, A. Öchsner (Eds.): Cellular and Porous Materials in Structures and Processes, CISM Courses and Lectures Vol. 521 (334 pages). Wien, Austria: Springer 2010.
8. A. Öchsner, W. Ahmed (Eds.): Biomechanics of Hard Tissues (306 pages). Weinheim, Germany: Wiley-VCH 2010.
9. L.F.M. da Silva, A. Pirondi, A. Öchsner (Eds.): Hybrid Adhesive Joints (309 pages). Berlin, Germany: Springer 2011.
10. L.F.M. da Silva, A. Öchsner, R.D. Adams (Eds.): Handbook of Adhesion Technology (1548 pages in two volumes). Berlin, Germany: Springer 2011.
11. A. Öchsner, G.E. Murch (Eds.): Heat Transfer in Multi-Phase Materials (460 pages). Berlin, Germany: Springer 2011.
12. A. Öchsner, A. Shokuhfar (Eds.): New Frontiers of Nanoparticles and Nanocomposite Materials (371 pages). Berlin, Germany: Springer 2013.
13. H. Altenbach, A.Öchsner (Eds.): Plasticity of Pressure-Sensitive Materials (376 pages). Berlin, Germany: Springer 2014

== Conferences ==
1. Chair of International Conference on Advanced Computational Engineering and Experimenting, ACE-X (since 2006)
2. Chair of International Conference on Diffusion in Solids and Liquids - DSL (since 2004)
