= Jutta Schmitt-Lang =

German politician (born 1982)

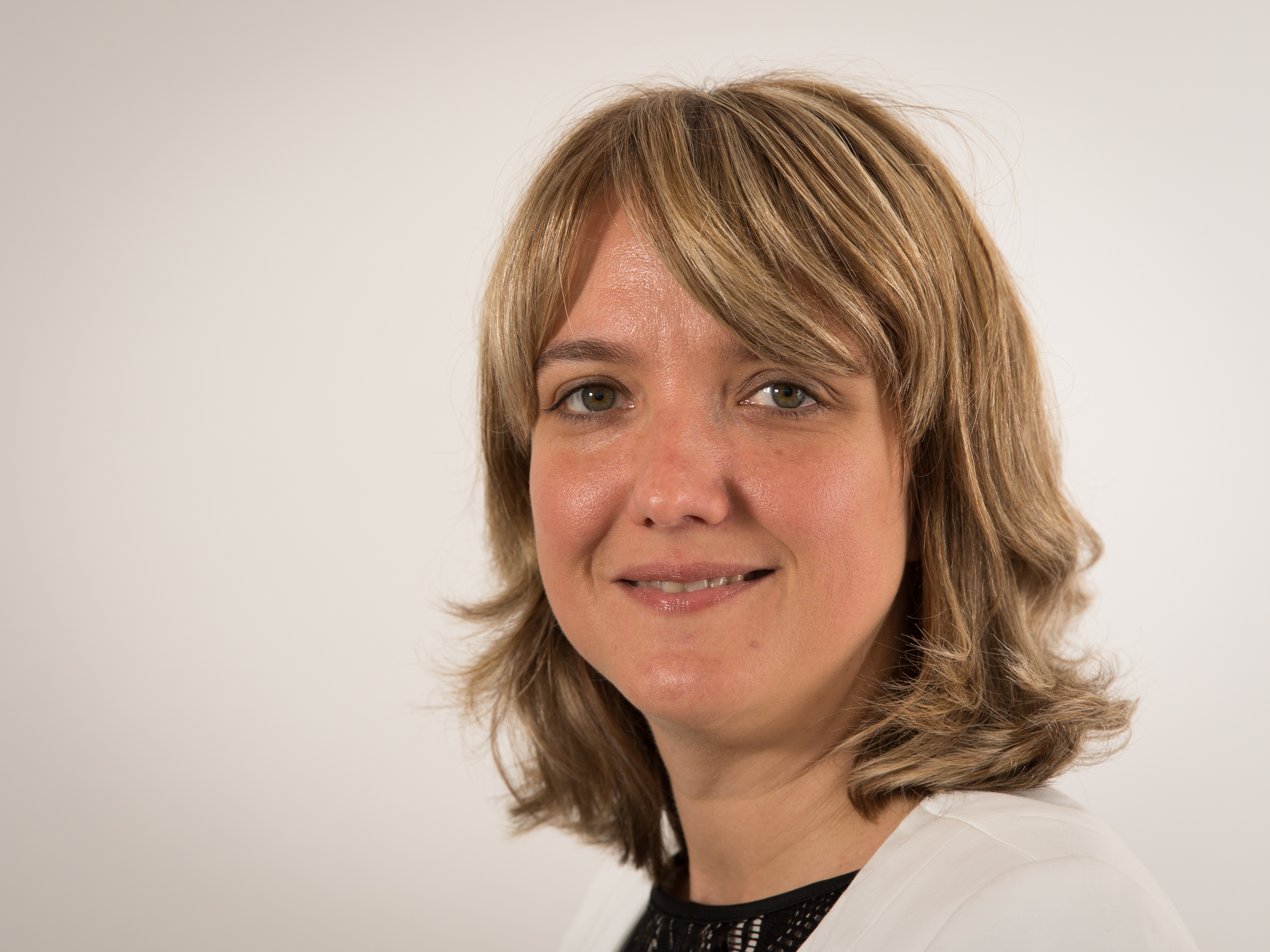
- Schmitt-Lang in 2017

Member of the Landtag of Saarland
- Incumbent
- Assumed office 25 April 2017

Personal details
- Born: 1 October 1982 (age 43) Blieskastel
- Party: Christian Democratic Union (since 1996)

Jutta Schmitt-Lang (born 1 October 1982 in Blieskastel) is a German politician serving as a member of the Landtag of Saarland since 2017. She has served as chairwoman of the Christian Democratic Union in Saarpfalz since 2022.
