= Wörschweiler Abbey =

Monastery in Saarland, Germany

Coordinates: 49°17′03″N 7°18′27″E

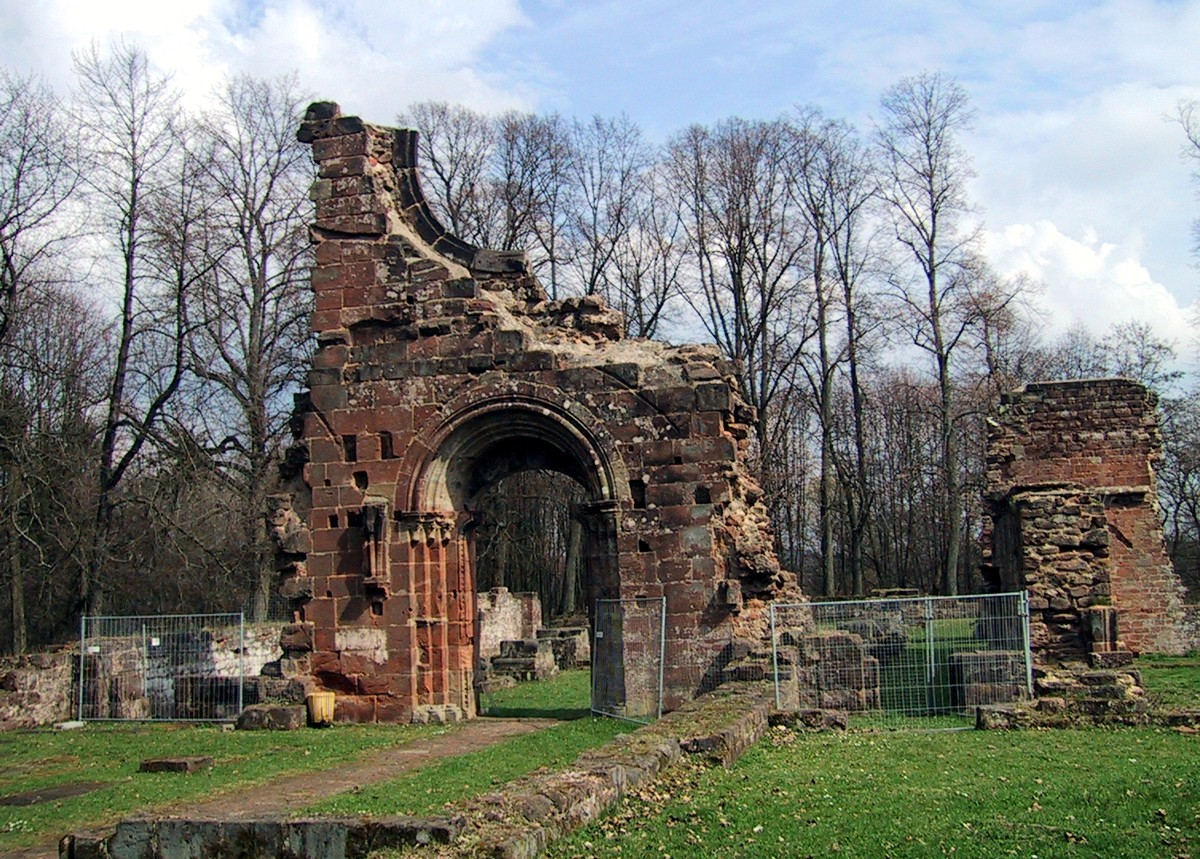
Ruins of Wörschweiler Abbey

Wörschweiler Abbey (Latin: Verneri-Villerium; German: Kloster Wörschweiler; also Werschweiler in older literature) is a former Cistercian abbey in the commune of Homburg in Saarland state, Germany. The monastery site is about 30 kilometres east of Saarbrücken, on a mountain called Marienberg.

In 1131, Earl Friedrich of Saarwerden and his wife Gertrud founded Wörschweiler Abbey. In 1171, Wörscheiler Abbey became a daughter house of Villers-Bettnach Abbey.

== Painting from 1810 ==
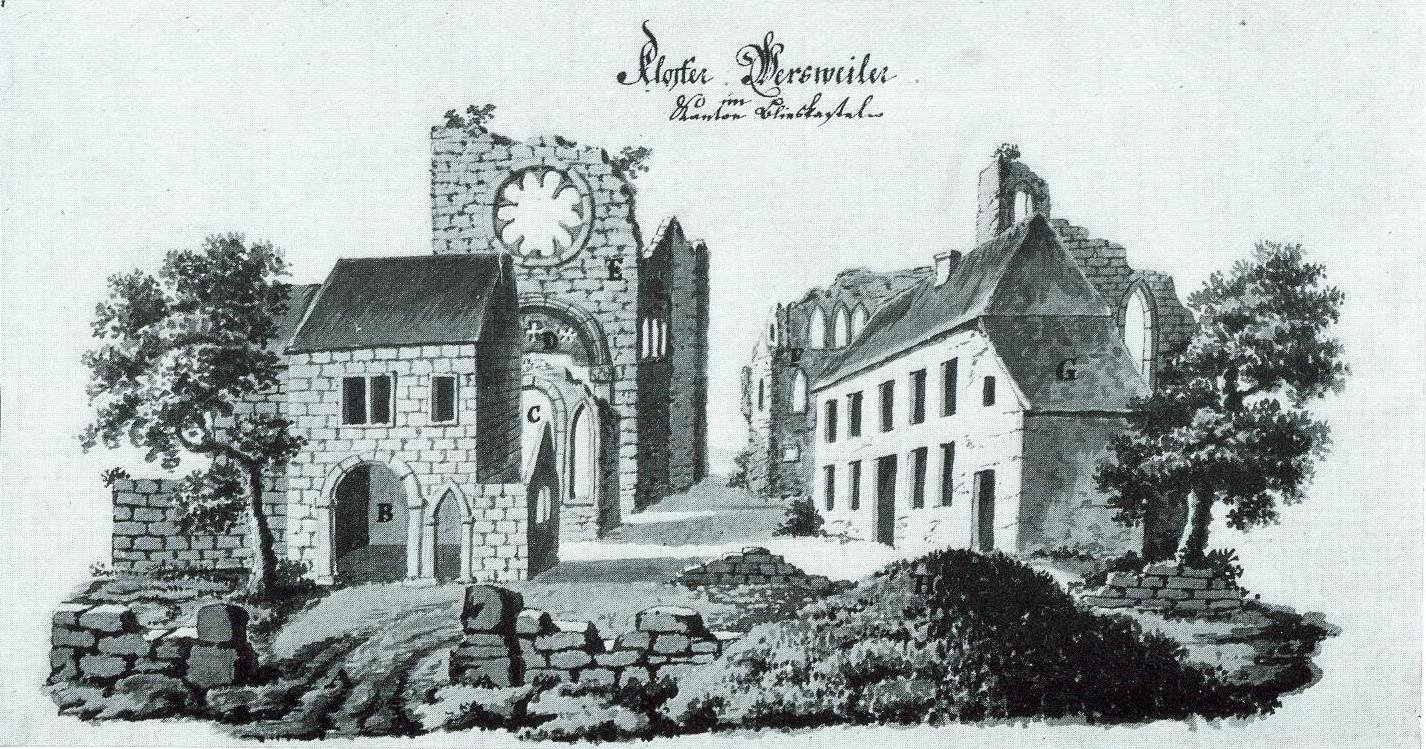
Wörschweiler Abbey by Franz Carl Derkum (1810), Trier Public Library, Handschrift No. 1831/964
