= Janauschek =

Janauschek is a surname. Notable people with the name include:

- Fanny Janauschek (1829–1904), Czech-American actress
- Leopold Janauschek (1827–1898), Austrian historian
