= Saint-Hubert, Moselle =

Saint-Hubert
- Commune
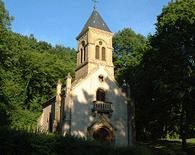
- The chapel in Rabas

- Coat of arms
- Location of Saint-Hubert
- Location within France Location within Grand Est
- Coordinates: 49°13′29″N 6°20′01″E
- Country: France
- Region: Grand Est
- Department: Moselle
- Arrondissement: Metz
- Canton: Le Pays Messin
- Intercommunality: Haut Chemin - Pays de Pange

Government
  - Mayor (2020–2026): Sylvie Richard
- Area^{1}: 16.04 km^{2} (6.19 sq mi)
- Elevation: 220 m (720 ft)
- Highest elevation: 353 m (1,158 ft)
- Lowest elevation: 204 m (669 ft)
- Population (2023): 229
  - Density: 14.3/km^{2} (37.0/sq mi)
- Time zone: UTC+01:00 (CET)
  - Summer (DST): UTC+02:00 (CEST)
- INSEE/Postal code: 57612 /57640
- ^{1} French Land Register data, which excludes lakes, ponds, glaciers > 1 km^{2} (0.386 sq mi or 247 acres) and river estuaries.

Saint-Hubert (French pronunciation: [sɛ̃.t‿ybɛʁ]; German: Sankt Hubert) is a commune in the Moselle department in Grand Est in north-eastern France.

== Rabas ==
Rabas is neither a village nor a hamlet, but an area located between the hamlet of Befey and the village of Saint-Hubert (all located on the territory of the commune).

As the legend says: "Charlemagne and group of hunters was following a deer in the forest. It was a very hot day and the people were very thirsty. Charlemagne makes the wish then build a church if Jesus came to help. Suddenly, under the feet of its horse spouts out a fresh and limpid source".

The first memory of the chapel is from 806. In 1049, the Pope Leo IX would have come to devote the church.

In 1884 the reconstruction of the chapel started by Abbé Cazin and Vicomte de Coetlosquet offered three windows for the chapel. And it acquired its current form.

Today, there is a new small church in the middle of the forest. Every year, on the Monday of Pentecost, many pilgrims visit the famous chapel.

== See also ==
- Communes of the Moselle department
