= August Becker (author) =

German writer (1828–1891)

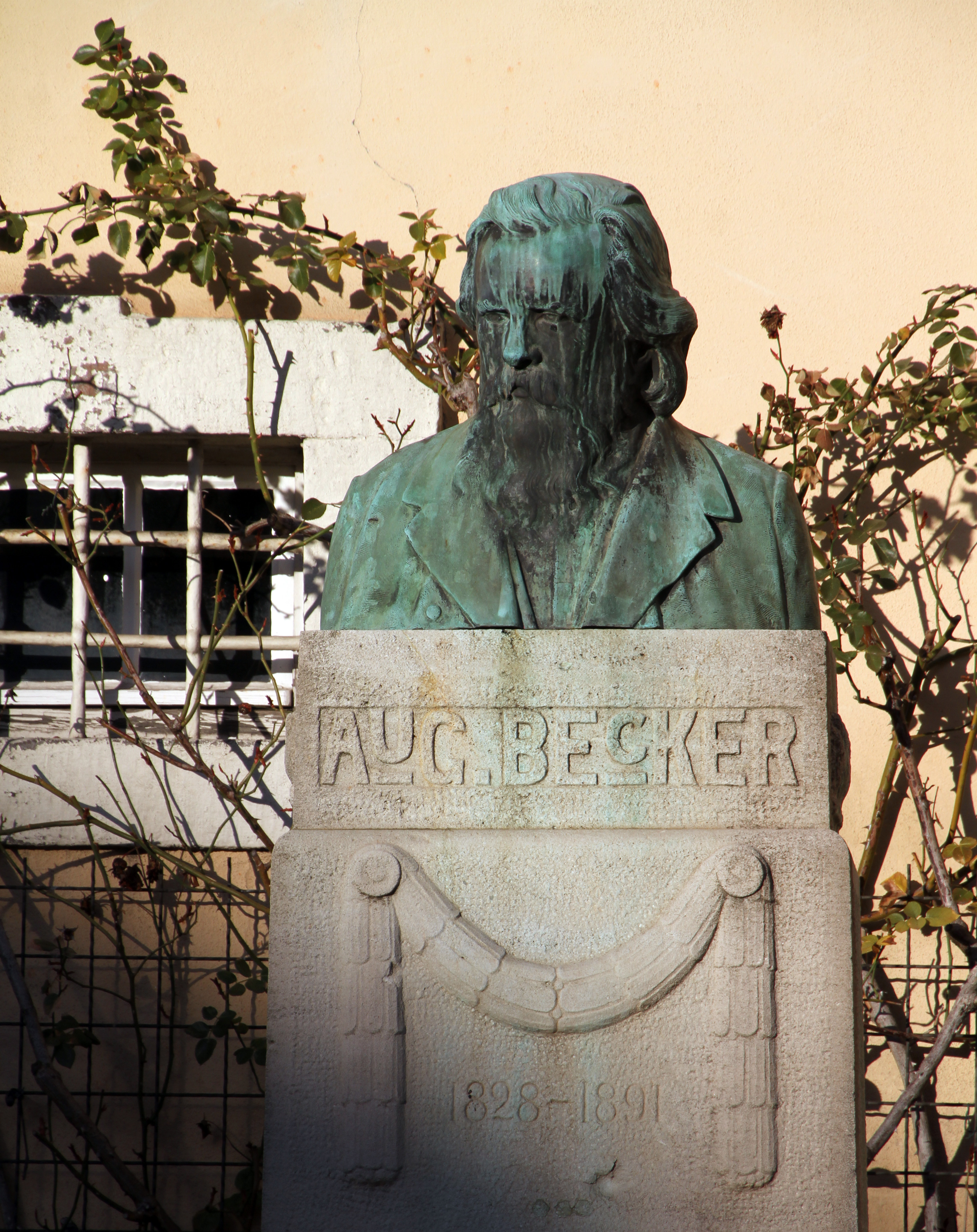
Memorial in Klingenmünster

August Becker (27 April 1828 in Klingenmünster – 23 March 1891 in Eisenach) was a German author.

== Biography ==
He studied history at the Ludwig-Maximilians-Universität München, from 1855 to 1859 was a member of the staff of the Allgemeine Zeitung of Augsburg, and from 1859 to 1864 editor of the liberal Isar-Zeitung. He published Jung-Friedel der Spielmann (Young Friedel, the Minstrel, 1854), a poem which established his reputation, and considerable fiction, including Des Rabbi Vermächtnis (The Rabbi's Bequest, 1866); Vervehmt (Proscribed, 1868), which was attacked for containing alleged portraitures of contemporaries of the Bavarian court; The Carbuncle (1870); My Sister (1876), descriptive of the doings of Lola Montez and the events of 1848 in Bavaria; Painter Fairbeard (1878); and Der Küster von Horst (The Sexton of Horst, 1889).
