= Kusel (Verbandsgemeinde) =

Former municipality in Rhineland-Palatinate, Germany

Coordinates: 49.534°N 7.398°E

Kusel is a former Verbandsgemeinde ("collective municipality") in the district of Kusel, Rhineland-Palatinate, Germany. In January 2018, it was merged into the new Verbandsgemeinde Kusel-Altenglan. The seat of the Verbandsgemeinde was in Kusel.

The Verbandsgemeinde Kusel consisted of the following Ortsgemeinden ("local municipalities"):

1. Albessen
2. Blaubach
3. Dennweiler-Frohnbach
4. Ehweiler
5. Etschberg
6. Haschbach am Remigiusberg
7. Herchweiler
8. Körborn
9. Konken
10. Kusel
11. Oberalben
12. Pfeffelbach
13. Reichweiler
14. Ruthweiler
15. Schellweiler
16. Selchenbach
17. Thallichtenberg
18. Theisbergstegen
