= Kusel Autumn Fair =

The Kusel Autumn Fair (German: Kuseler Herbstmesse), one of the biggest folk festivals in the Palatinate region of Germany, takes place annually on the first weekend in September in the county town of Kusel.

== Description ==
It was first held in 1924 and generally lasts five days. It is officially started on Fridays with an opening ceremony by the Bürgermeister and the enthroning of the Kuseline. The fair always closes with a firework display on Tuesday.

In addition to various amusement rides and a festival tent, there are also many stalls along Trier Street where various consumer goods are offered. Information on the numbers of visitors is not yet available.

== Kuseline ==
Every year on Friday, the newly elected Kuseline is presented, a woman chosen annually by a jury of local dignitaries, comparable to a wine queen. The election of the first Kuseline in 1977 was initiated by Paul Kaps, the former deputy editor-in-chief of the daily newspaper, Die Rheinpfalz, and the then leader of the Rhenish-Palatinate local editorial office in Kusel, Wolfdietrich Meder.

=== Election ===
The election is held annually two weeks before the Kusel Autumn Fair in the tithe barn at Lichtenberg Castle. There, the candidates stand individually in front of a jury and talk about their profession, hobbies and motivation to apply for the office of Kuseline. The jury is composed of the one representative from each of the following: Kusel county, the collective municipality of Kusel, the town of Kusel, the Kreissparkasse bank, the Kusel interest group, the retail association, the tourist office, the Karlsberg brewery, the Simon drinks company, the aviation club, Voborsky Intercoiffure and two representatives from the local newsroom. The Kuseline who is still in office, not only sits on the jury, but also announces her successor's name after the election.

=== Inauguration ===
The accession of the new Kuseline traditionally takes place on the first evening of the autumn fair. She is introduced into office by a leading editor of the daily newspaper Die Rheinpfalz. Since 2007, the former Kuselinen have met in the Deutsches Haus restaurant. Afterwards they go to the exhibition tent together to participate in the enthronement.

During her one year in office, the Kuseline receives numerous gifts from the sponsors participating in the election. This includes a sightseeing flight over the county of Kusel, a trip to the twin town of Toucy, free hairstyles at Intercoiffure Voborsky and much more. The current Kuseline has numerous engagements in and around the county of Kusel. The first date after the enthronement is the procession on Saturday at the Kusel Autumn Fair. On the occasion of the 30th anniversary of the Kuseline, a number of former Kuselines took part in the parade of the Kusel Autumn Fair.

=== Office holders ===
- 1977/1978: Ruth Hinkelmann
- 1978/1979: Petra Herrmann
- 1979/1980: Jutta Baehr
- 1980/1981: Sabine Fischer
- 1981/1982: Karin Pfeffer
- 1982/1983: Gisela Bell
- 1983/1984: Doris Hektor
- 1984/1985: Gabi Matzenbacher
- 1985/1986: Uschi Hoffmann
- 1986/1987: Sabine Ganter
- 1987/1988: Tatjana Kuhne
- 1988/1989: Stefanie Gilcher
- 1989/1990: Sonja Pohl
- 1990/1991: Anke Matz
- 1991/1992: Anika Scheuermann
- 1992/1993: Michaela Müller
- 1993/1994: Nicole Niebergall
- 1994/1995: Janine Wild
- 1995/1996: Kerstin Steinhauer
- 1996/1997: Martina Weber
- 1997/1998: Nadine Klein
- 1998/1999: Julia Oberfrank
- 1999/2000: Jasmin Immesberger
- 2000/2001: Jessica Heidrich
- 2001/2002: Michaela Rech
- 2002/2003: Katja Ranker
- 2003/2004: Annika Kreckmann
- 2004/2005: Jennifer Albl
- 2005/2006: Sarah Schnitzer
- 2006/2007: Lena Daniel
- 2007/2008: Insa Emrich
- 2008/2009: Sabrina Pannes
- 2009/2010: Rose Kreuzahler
- 2010/2011: Ines Schmidt
- 2011/2012: Verena Letzel
- 2012/2013: Hannah Decker
- 2013/2014: Nadine Sooss
- 2014/2015: Julia Reiser
- 2015/2016: Jessica Ulrich
- 2016/2017: Milena Keiper
