= Herchweiler =

- Municipality
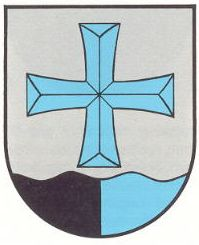
- Coat of arms

- Location of Herchweiler within Kusel district
- Interactive map of Herchweiler
- Location within Germany Location within Rhineland-Palatinate
- Coordinates: 49°30′59″N 7°17′34″E
- Country: Germany
- State: Rhineland-Palatinate
- District: Kusel
- Municipal assoc.: Kusel-Altenglan

Government
  - Mayor (2019–24): Sigrid Stolingwa

Area
  - Total: 2.85 km^{2} (1.10 sq mi)
- Elevation: 338 m (1,109 ft)

Population (2025-12-31)
  - Total: 462
  - Density: 162/km^{2} (420/sq mi)
- Time zone: UTC+01:00 (CET)
  - Summer (DST): UTC+02:00 (CEST)
- Postal codes: 66871
- Dialling codes: 06384
- Vehicle registration: KUS

Herchweiler is an Ortsgemeinde – a municipality belonging to a Verbandsgemeinde, a kind of collective municipality – in the Kusel district in Rhineland-Palatinate, Germany. It belongs to the Verbandsgemeinde of Kusel-Altenglan, whose seat is in Kusel.

== Geography ==
=== Location ===
Herchweiler lies in the Selchenbach valley, upstream from the upper Oster valley, in the Western Palatinate, right at the boundary with the Saarland. The Selchenbach flows into the village from the south after turning in a broad bow towards the west just south of the village, whence it flows onwards towards the southwest, emptying into the Oster near the neighbouring village of Haupersweiler. Smaller brooks empty into the Selchenbach near Herchweiler, among them the Herchweiler Bach and the Judenbach. The village itself lies at an elevation of some 340 m above sea level, although the mountains around it reach 450 m above sea level in the Kahlenberg southeast of the village. North of the village looms the Prenzelberg (398 m). Beginning here is the Naturschutzgebiet Steinberg (conservation area), which stretches from Herchweiler over the Steinberg within Pfeffelbach’s limits, and in which amphibian species that have become rare can be found. Right along the village’s western edge runs the boundary with the Saarland. The Wolfsbornerhof lies northeast of the village, and the Markeicherhof to the south. The municipal area measures 290 ha, of which 76 ha is wooded.

The village street In der Gaß (“In the Lane”) long lay within Haupersweiler to the west, in the Saarland, until a state agreement between Rhineland-Palatinate and the Saarland on 27 May 2003 adjusted the boundary between the two states. This went into effect on 1 January 2004, taking In der Gaß from the municipality of Freisen and putting it, along with its 53 inhabitants, in the municipality of Herchweiler in Rhineland-Palatinate.

=== Neighbouring municipalities ===
Herchweiler borders in the east on the municipality of Albessen, in the southeast on the municipality of Selchenbach and in the west and north on the municipality of Freisen, which lies in the Saarland.

=== Constituent communities ===
Also belonging to Herchweiler are the outlying homesteads of Markeicherhof and Wolfsbornerhof.

=== Municipality’s layout ===
Most of Herchweiler's houses stand on the des Selchenbach's right bank along Kuseler Straße, branching off which in the village's west end and running northwards is Haupersweilerstraße, or die Gaß, the street that was the focus of the boundary adjustment. Indeed, until 31 December 2003, the boundary between Rhineland-Palatinate and the Saarland ran down the middle of this street, and thus, just under 10% of the village's population lived in the latter state, and thereby actually in the neighbouring village of Haupersweiler, not Herchweiler. Parallel to Hauptstraße (“Main Street”) runs Bergstraße (“Mountain Street”), with the street Im Bruchgraben (“In the Quarry Pit”), a new building zone, branching off to the north. Southwards along the Selchenbach's left bank runs Brückenstraße (“Bridge Road”). The farmhouses in the older settled parts of the village are all Einfirsthäuser (“one-roof-ridge houses”), which are generally customary in the Westrich, an historic region that encompasses areas in both Germany and France. A fountain in the village centre made out of an ornamented metal column and a sandstone trough is under monumental protection. Also noteworthy are the Hebrew inscriptions on houses once occupied by Jews. The municipal centre and the former schoolhouse both stand on Kuseler Straße. An ample playground has also been laid out in the village centre, near a fire station. The graveyard with its chapel lies at the east end of Kuseler Straße, while the sporting ground is found in a wooded area south of the village on Ostertalstraße. The village has won several prizes in the contest Unser Dorf soll schöner werden (“Our village should become lovelier”).

== History ==
=== Antiquity ===
The area around Herchweiler was likely already inhabited by the New Stone Age. An Iron Age mound, which was part of the Albessen group of barrows, was opened up in the 19th century, but has now disappeared. Grave goods were recovered and described (a bronze ring, a footring, armrings and a bronze figurine), but their whereabouts are likewise now unknown. In Gallo-Roman times, too, the area was settled, even if no archaeological finds from the time have been made in Herchweiler itself. A road that runs from south to north through the municipal area is generally described as a Roman road.

=== Middle Ages ===
Today's municipality of Herchweiler belonged wholly to the Nahegau, whose western boundary between Niederkirchen and Sankt Wendel ran in a north-northwesterly direction. The 843 Treaty of Verdun grouped the whole municipality into East Francia.

The eastern part of Herchweiler – the part that was already in Rhineland-Palatinate before the 2004 boundary adjustment – found its way, as an apparent donation by King Clovis, to the Bishop's Church of Reims, and then to the Abbey of Saint-Remi in Reims, which held on to the extensive holdings in Kusel and Altenglan until the Reformation. The holdings were then sold to the Dukes of Palatinate-Zweibrücken, who were successors to the Counts of Veldenz as Schirmvögte (monastery overseers). This so-called Remigiusland had belonged to the extensive imperial estate woodlands in the time when the Franks took over the land, as did likewise the imperial land of Kaiserslautern and the holdings around Sankt Wendel, Wolfersweiler and Baumholder, in one seamless expanse.

The holdings around those three places may also have found their way to the Church of Verdun through kingly donations sometime between 575 and 595. Reputedly sometime late in Bishop of Reims Giles's lifetime – he died in 590 – the king at that time sold the Remigiusland. In the time between these two donations, that is, between 575 and 590 but likely nearer the latter, the area around Oberkirchen with the western part of Herchweiler's municipal area – the part that was in the Saarland before the 2004 boundary adjustment – was donated from royal ownership, but by whom, it is not known. Thirteenth-century documents from Tholey Abbey and even 9th-century records that point to the Church of the Saviour in Frankfurt as the recipient have not led researchers near enough to the time of these donations for the recipient to be clear. The border splitting Herchweiler into two pieces remained in the time that followed, in one form or another, until the transfer of territory on 1 January 2004.

Also unclear is the border's historical alignment. Only in 1330 did a mention crop up in the historical record. It describes the Mons Lapidis (or Steinberg in German; both mean “Stone Mountain”; it may be a reference to a feature northeast of Herchweiler) as a point on the border.

Just when Herchweiler was founded is unknown. Whenever it was, the whole village lay from the beginning within the Remigiusland, although right at its border. It could be that Herchweiler already existed in 1112 when Count Gerlach I from the Nahegau founded the County of Veldenz, at the same time also assuming the Vogtei over the Remigiusland. Only in 1430, though, did Herchweiler have its first documentary mention in a Veldenz document, according to which, under Frederick III, Count of Veldenz, the knight Siegfried Blick from Castle Lichtenberg bestowed upon his wife Katharina von Sötern a wealth of goods as a widow's estate, and also bestowed upon Herchweiler a yearly Malter of oats, and upon Herchweiler and Leitersweiler together a yearly Malter of grain. Nothing in the historical record up to that time gave a clue to a part of the village lying outside the Remigiusland and therefore outside the County of Veldenz. In 1444, Frederick III, the last from the Hohengeroldseck family to rule the county, died without a male heir; the county passed to his son-in-law Stephen, Count Palatine of Simmern-Zweibrücken (son of Rupert, King of Germany), widower of Frederick's daughter, Anna of Veldenz. Stephen, combining his lands, created the new County Palatine of Zweibrücken, which in the fullness of time came to be known as the Duchy of Palatinate-Zweibrücken. Stephen chose the town of Zweibrücken as comital residence. Within Palatinate-Zweibrücken, Herchweiler was grouped into the Oberamt of Lichtenberg and the Unteramt of Konken.

One part of the Remigiusland was known as the “Kingdom”. In a 1491 sale agreement, Thomas von Contwig, Amtmann at Lichtenberg, and Else von Lichtenberg sold Count Johann Ludwig von Nassau-Saarbrücken their property, das Königkriche (“the Kingdom”; in modern German this would be das Königreich). Herchweiler is mentioned in the certificate of sale as Herchwiler.

=== Modern times ===
The Kuseler Landgerichtsweistum of 6 October 1541 (Landgericht means “state court”, while a Weistum – cognate with English wisdom – was a legal pronouncement issued by men learned in law in the Middle Ages and early modern times) describes the border more exactly than earlier documents, mentioning that it goes up the Selchenbach towards Herchweiler, and from Herchweiler up the brook (Judenbach) as far as Marbachers Wiergin (modern name: Marbachs Weiher, a pond). In Palatine Zweibrücken, civil servant and geographer Johannes Hoffmann's 1588 Beschreibung des Oberamtes Lichtenberg (“Description of the Oberamt of Lichtenberg”), set forth a very wordy description of the border's alignment that mentioned Herchweiler no fewer than 18 times. The reader learns with respect to Herchweiler, among other things: “The said strip (he meant the brook later known as the Judenbach) divides the village of Herchweiler into two different high court lordly domains, making the one part on the righthand side (he meant looking upstream, and thus actually the left bank) belongs to the Amt of Lichtenberg; the other side is Lotharingian and belongs to the Oberkirchen court (district). It is also reckoned to be a community along with the villages of Seitzweiler and Haupertsweiler.” Thus the reader gathers that by this time, the village had spread across the border brook, and that some of the houses belonged to the village of Haupertsweiler (an archaic spelling; the T has since disappeared) about a kilometre away, and thereby also belonged to the then court of Oberkirchen in the Duchy of Lorraine. From the historical record, it is not known either way whether Jews had yet settled in the part of the village with which the Lords of Oberstein had then been enfeoffed. The fact is that at the time, Jews were sometimes tolerated in the Duchy of Palatinate-Zweibrücken, though they lay under considerably tighter controls than in neighbouring electoral states. It could thus be that even then, Jews were settling right at the border so that they could pursue business – more or less unlawfully – in Zweibrücken territory. In the latter half of the 18th century, only Jews lived in the non-Zweibrücken part of the village, in the Judengasse (“Jews’ Lane”). The domain beyond the Judenbach originally belonged to the Nahegau, which in the 12th century split up into various lordships, with the Imperially immediate Lordship of Oberstein also assuming Lotharingian territory with Haupersweiler as a fief. In 1766, this area passed to the Lordship of Leyen, under which the Jews enjoyed greater freedom. According to the 1609 Oberamt of Lichtenberg ecclesiastical visitation protocol, 61 people of the Reformed faith then lived in the Zweibrücken part of Herchweiler. Whether there were also Jews living in the village is something that these statistics do not show. It is however known that the whole village was thrust deeply into the frightful events of both the Thirty Years' War and French King Louis XIV's wars of conquest. Herchweiler recovered from the population losses in these wars in the course of the 18th century, and there was soon even emigration again.

==== Recent times ====
When the French Revolutionary troops came marching in, the old electoral states were swept away as of 1793, and in 1801, France annexed all the German lands on the Rhine’s left bank. Herchweiler remained split in two. Both parts of the village now lay in the Department of Sarre, whose seat was at Trier, but otherwise they were grouped into different administrative entities. The greater part of the village, which had belonged to the Duchy of Palatinate-Zweibrücken, lay in the Arrondissement of Birkenfeld, the Canton of Kusel and the Mairie (“Mayoralty”) of Burglichtenberg, whereas the smaller part, which had belonged to the House of Leyen, lay in the Arrondissement of Saarbrücken, the Canton of St. Wendel and the Mairie of Oberkirchen. According to a census undertaken by the French administration, there were 37 Jews then living in Herchweiler, who are all known by name. In 1815, after the Napoleonic French had been driven out, Herchweiler found itself under first the Imperial and Royal Austrian and Royal Bavarian State Administration Commission (Kaiserliche und königliche österreichische und königliche bairische Landesadministrationskommission), and then soon afterwards the Kingdom of Bavaria. It remained Bavarian until 1945, at least the greater part of the village. Herchweiler still remained split in two, only now, the two parts found themselves in different countries. While the greater part of the village that had been in the Canton of Kusel passed to the Kingdom of Bavaria in 1816, the Judengasse, which had been in the Canton of St. Wendel, instead passed to the Principality of Lichtenberg, a newly created exclave of the Duchy of Saxe-Coburg-Saalfeld, which as of 1826 became the Duchy of Saxe-Coburg and Gotha. As part of this state, it passed by sale in 1834 to the Kingdom of Prussia, which made this area into the Sankt Wendel district. Although the Prussian government kept a close watch on Jews and wanted to thwart any Jewish immigration, Herchweiler's Jewish population kept growing. In 1844, there were 41 Jewish inhabitants living in the Judengasse, and by 1855 this was 50, reaching 64 by 1868. At the same time, a few Jewish families were settling even in the Bavarian part of the village. Towards the end of the 19th century, though, a steady stream of emigration was to be noted, such that already by the onset of Nazi rule, there were only a few Jewish families in Herchweiler as against the number there had been in the mid 19th century. A very few managed to survive in the village to 1945. In the late 1920s and early 1930s, the Nazi Party (NSDAP) was becoming quite popular in Herchweiler. In the 1928 Reichstag elections, only 9.7% of the local votes went to Adolf Hitler’s party, but by the 1930 Reichstag elections, this had grown to 28.6%. By the time of the 1933 Reichstag elections, after Hitler had already seized power, local support for the Nazis had swollen to 53.2%. Hitler’s success in these elections paved the way for his Enabling Act of 1933 (Ermächtigungsgesetz), thus starting the Third Reich in earnest. Repeated efforts to unite the two parts of the municipality were long doomed to failure. Particularly hard on the village were the times when the Saar was split away from Germany (1920-1935 and 1945–1955) after each of the world wars. Only in 2002 was it decided in a bilateral agreement between the states of Rhineland-Palatinate and the Saarland that the municipality’s two parts should be brought together under one administration. This was signed in 2003 and came into force on 1 January 2004. Today, the whole village of Herchweiler belongs as an Ortsgemeinde to the Verbandsgemeinde of Kusel-Altenglan.

=== In der Gaß ===
As for the street In der Gaß, it, along with the rest of the neighbouring village of Haupersweiler, has the following territorial history:

Date	Landholder/Authority
1128	Disibodenberg Abbey
1261	Tholey Abbey
1274	Counts of Lotharingia
1278	Dukes of Lotharingia
1766	France (Upper Amt of Schaumberg)
1781	House of Leyen (Lordship of Oberkirchen)
1798	France, Mairie (“Mayoralty”) of Oberkirchen, canton of St.Wendel
1816	Saxe-Coburg, Bürgermeisterei (“Mayoralty”) of St. Wendel Land
1834	Prussia
1935	Saar reincorporated into Germany, Birkenfeld district
1945 (19 March)	American occupation
1945 (10 July)	French occupation
1947 (24 July)	Allied-occupied Saarland
1957 (1 January)	Saarland politically incorporated into West Germany
1959 (5/6 July)	Day “X”, Saarland economically incorporated into West Germany
2004 (1 January)	State boundary adjusted to put In der Gaß in Herchweiler, Rhineland-Palatinate

The small section of the village, In der Gaß, was transferred from the Saarland, represented by Minister-President Peter Müller, to Rhineland-Palatinate, represented by Minister-President Kurt Beck, with the signing of an agreement between the two states on 27 May 2003. It went into effect on 1 January 2004, ending a longstanding irritant for local people by making the village politically whole.

=== Population development ===
Living in Herchweiler up until the mid 20th century were mainly small farmers, while the Jewish sector of the population – almost 25% of the total at times – earned its livelihood mainly from trade. From the mid 19th century, the income structure changed. More and more inhabitants found work in quarries, collieries and ironworks in the Saarland. Jews, who held more rights on the side of the old border held by the House of Leyen than they did on the other side, where the Duchy of Palatinate-Zweibrücken held sway, likely settled as traders right at the border for this reason, which allowed them not only to keep their relatively great measure of Leyen freedom but also to do business with the Zweibrücken farmers who lived just across the line. Today, for most of the inhabitants, Herchweiler is a quiet residential community for people of the most varied of occupations, most of whom must commute to work.

The following table shows population development over the centuries for Herchweiler, with some figures broken down by religious denomination:

Year	1609	1825	1835	1971	1905	1939	1961	2004	2008
Total	61	201	231	285	360	462	538	600	580
Catholic	–	47					65
Evangelical	61	146					466

Owing to a lack of records, figures from before 1861 do not count Haupersweiler Straße, which was home to 40 to 60 inhabitants, who until 1933 were all Jewish.

=== Municipality’s name ===
The village's name, Herchweiler, has the common German placename ending —weiler, which as a standalone word means “hamlet” (originally “homestead”), to which is prefixed the syllable Herch—, which likely comes from a personal name Hericho. Thus, according to this theory, the municipality's name originally meant “Hericho’s Homestead”, although it is unknown who this man might have been. In 1430, Herchweiler had its first documentary mention as Herchwilr in a document from the Counts of Veldenz. Among other forms that the name has taken over the ages are Hirchwiler (1446), Herchwilre (1460) and Hörchweiler (1587). The name Judenherchweiler is still used now and then. The prefix means “Jews’”. This arose in the 18th century, when there were already relatively many Jews living in the village, and the prefix provided a way of distinguishing the village from Herschweiler, which is in the same district and has a very similar-sounding name, differing by only one sound: “Herchweiler” has [ç] where “Herschweiler” has [ʃ]; these are more distinct from each other in some German speakers’ speech than in others’.

== Religion ==
Herchweiler in the Remigiusland was originally a holding of the Bishopric of Reims, although in ecclesiastical organization, it belonged to the Archbishopric of Mainz. Going by the principle of cuius regio, eius religio, the inhabitants were forced to convert to Lutheranism beginning in 1523 as required by the ducal administration, but then in 1588, on Count Palatine Johannes I's orders, everyone had to convert to Calvinism. After the Thirty Years' War, freedom of choice in religion was theoretically possible, though Herchweiler's Christian inhabitants remained overwhelmingly Reformed (Calvinist). In 1818 came the Protestant Union, in which the Lutheran and Calvinist churches merged. While Catholics were once more a fifth of the population in the early 19th century, even when the Prussian section of the village was counted, their share of the population has since then shrunk to a bit more than a tenth. From the Middle Ages onwards, the village's Christian inhabitants belonged to the Church of Konken. The Catholic Christians nowadays belong to the Church of Kusel. Jews likely settled in what was later to be the section of the village in the Saarland beginning in the early 16th century, formed their own worship community and as of 1790 owned a small house of worship, known locally as the Judenschule (“Jews’ School”). Next to this in the early 19th century was a small mikveh. Like all mikva’ot in Germany, this was no longer in use by the late 19th century. The Jewish community buried its dead at the Jewish graveyard in Thallichtenberg. As early as the late 19th century, the number of Jewish citizens in Herchweiler began to shrink markedly, reflecting a general trend throughout the Western Palatinate. After 1933 and the onset of the Third Reich, only three Jewish families still lived in the village. They were forbidden to practise their religion, and the municipality had the house of worship torn down in 1937 because of “disrepair”, on orders from the state. While the village's Jews may have been subject to the various hardships to which all Jews in Nazi Germany fell victim, there were no excesses in Herchweiler on Kristallnacht (9–10 November 1938). Three Jewish citizens in the village survived. Today, there are no longer any Jews living in Herchweiler.

== Politics ==
=== Municipal council ===
The council is made up of 12 council members, who were elected by majority vote at the municipal election held on 7 June 2009, and the honorary mayor as chairman.

=== Mayor ===
Herchweiler's mayor is Sigrid Stolingwa.

=== Coat of arms ===
The German blazon reads: Über von Schwarz und Blau gespaltenem Wellenschildfuß in Silber ein schwebendes, geschliffenes, geradearmiges Tatzenkreuz.

The municipality's arms might in English heraldic language be described thus: Argent above a base wavy per pale sable and azure a cross pattée humetty of the last.

The base in two tinctures is supposed to refer to the village's historical division between lordships, countries and even between Bundesländer after the Second World War until 2004. One side belonged to the Duchy of Palatinate-Zweibrücken while the other belonged to either Lotharingia or the House of Leyen, and later Herchweiler was split along the same boundary into Bavarian and Prussian sectors. The line between the two tinctures stands for the Judenbach, the brook that was named after the Jewish inhabitants who once populated the smaller, western sector of the village, and which marked the boundary between the village's two politically separate parts. The cross goes back to an old village seal. The arms have been borne since 1983 when they were approved by the now defunct Rheinhessen-Pfalz Regierungsbezirk administration in Neustadt an der Weinstraße.

== Culture and sightseeing ==
=== Buildings ===
The following are listed buildings or sites in Rhineland-Palatinate’s Directory of Cultural Monuments:

- Near Brückenstraße 1 – fountain, cast-iron column, latter half of the 19th century
- In der Gaß 14 – one-floor Quereinhaus (a combination residential and commercial house divided for these two purposes down the middle, perpendicularly to the street) with rare German-Hebrew door inscription, 1858

=== Regular events ===
Herchweiler holds a three-day-long kermis (church consecration festival) on the third weekend in July.

== Economy and infrastructure ==
=== Economic structure ===
Herchweiler was a farming village in which craftsmen and tradesmen were also always at home. The farming businesses were generally not very big, while the workers’ share of the population grew steadily beginning in the mid 19th century with the opening of the mines in the Saarland. Jewish traders have no longer been found here since Adolf Hitler’s dictatorship. Most members of the workforce today must commute to work, mainly to Kusel, Kaiserslautern and places in the Saarland. A few private companies exist in the village, such as a drink distributor, a building firm and distilleries.

=== Education ===
A report from Kramer that there was a Catholic school in Herchweiler is most likely false. It is further reported that in 1759, the municipality raised four Rhenish guilders for a schoolteacher's room and board. In 1777, the 19-year-old Jakob Theis taught in Herchweiler, and in 1785 the teacher was the 12-year-old Johann Jacob Schwarm from Pfeffelbach. Later schoolteachers whose names are known were Daniel Neu (about 1830), Adam Schöpper (about 1840) and Ludwig Klensch (1851–1887). For a short time, Klensch's successor was Friedrich Lang. The villagers were dissatisfied with his performance. When Lang wanted to get married, the Royal Bezirksamt would not grant approval. The teacher later suffered chronic stomach cramps and became unable to perform his duties. In 1890 came Ludwig Becker, who was from Ehweiler. He had passed with good marks at the Kaiserslautern Seminary and had gone on to work in Neuburg an der Donau. In 1895 he was granted leave to wed a lady named Katharina Näher from Herchweiler. Becker also moonlit by running the postal agency (Poststelle), and the Protestant school inspector Stepp from Konken attested that he was very hardworking. In the time of hunger during the First World War, this teacher got into trouble for apparently wrongfully having a hundredweight of grain ground at the mill in the neighbouring Prussian village of Seitzweiler. From 1889, the school had two classes. Problems sometimes arose with the schoolchildren from the Prussian part of the village, where 61 inhabitants lived in 1878, most of whom were Jewish, although there were three Protestant families. Hitherto, the Prussian parents had deemed it fit to pay a school fee for their children, and make donations, too, such as delivering heating fuel. In 1893 the Bavarian government abolished all private school fees, and before there was any official pronouncement on the matter, Becker refused to let the Prussian schoolchildren attend classes. The Bezirksamt was now demanding from the neighbouring municipality of Haupersweiler a payment of 15 marks for each child. The consistorial and school inspector Stepp, too, held the opinion that this amount was much too high, and apparently so did the municipality of Haupersweiler, for it refused to pay. In the end, a fee of 12 marks was deemed fair. Since the second class had been introduced, the teacher had been teaching them alternately, and by 1927 the demands for a second classroom had become quite loud. Because the municipality could not raise the needed amount of 30,000 marks, the expansion was delayed until 1931. Nowadays, there is not even a school in Herchweiler, and primary school pupils go to school in Konken, while Hauptschule students go to the Roßberg in Kusel. Kusel is also the location of other kinds of secondary schools, vocational schools and special schools.

=== Transport ===
Herchweiler lies off the main cross-country roads on Kreisstraße 14, and simple linking roads lead across Saarland territory to Schwarzerden and Haupersweiler. The village therefore sees only light traffic. Nevertheless, the junction with Bundesstraße 420 lies only 2 km away, and the nearest Autobahn interchange, onto the A 62 (Kaiserslautern–Trier), lies only 6 km away to the north. The nearest stations are at Kusel, Glan-Münchweiler and Sankt Wendel. Kusel station is the terminus of the Landstuhl–Kusel railway, connecting to Kaiserslautern and is served by an hourly Regionalbahn service, the RB 67, called the Glantalbahn (the name of which refers to the Glan Valley Railway, which shared some of the route of the Landstuhl–Kusel line, including through Glan-Münchweiler station). Sankt Wendel station is on the Nahe Valley Railway (Nahetalbahn).
