= Kusel-Altenglan =

Municipality in Rhineland-Palatinate, Germany

- Verbandsgemeinde
- Location of Kusel-Altenglan within Kusel district
- Interactive map of Kusel-Altenglan
- Location within Germany Location within Rhineland-Palatinate
- Coordinates: 49°32′N 7°24′E
- Country: Germany
- State: Rhineland-Palatinate
- District: Kusel
- Seat: Kusel
- Subdivisions: 34 municipalities

Area
  - Total: 179.53 km^{2} (69.32 sq mi)

Population (2025-12-31)
  - Total: 22,647
  - Density: 126.15/km^{2} (326.72/sq mi)
- Time zone: UTC+01:00 (CET)
  - Summer (DST): UTC+02:00 (CEST)
- Website: www.vgka.de

Kusel-Altenglan is a Verbandsgemeinde ("collective municipality") in the district of Kusel, in Rhineland-Palatinate, Germany. The seat of the Verbandsgemeinde is in Kusel. It was formed on 1 January 2018 by the merger of the former Verbandsgemeinden Kusel and Altenglan.

The Verbandsgemeinde Kusel-Altenglan consists of the following Ortsgemeinden ("local municipalities"):

1. Albessen
2. Altenglan
3. Bedesbach
4. Blaubach
5. Bosenbach
6. Dennweiler-Frohnbach
7. Ehweiler
8. Elzweiler
9. Erdesbach
10. Etschberg
11. Föckelberg
12. Haschbach am Remigiusberg
13. Herchweiler
14. Horschbach
15. Körborn
16. Konken
17. Kusel
18. Neunkirchen am Potzberg
19. Niederalben
20. Niederstaufenbach
21. Oberalben
22. Oberstaufenbach
23. Pfeffelbach
24. Rammelsbach
25. Rathsweiler
26. Reichweiler
27. Ruthweiler
28. Rutsweiler am Glan
29. Schellweiler
30. Selchenbach
31. Thallichtenberg
32. Theisbergstegen
33. Ulmet
34. Welchweiler
