= Konken =

- Municipality
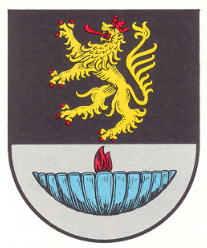
- Coat of arms

- Location of Konken within Kusel district
- Interactive map of Konken
- Location within Germany Location within Rhineland-Palatinate
- Coordinates: 49°30′32″N 7°21′11″E
- Country: Germany
- State: Rhineland-Palatinate
- District: Kusel
- Municipal assoc.: Kusel-Altenglan

Government
  - Mayor (2019–24): Karl Friedrich Knecht

Area
  - Total: 7.04 km^{2} (2.72 sq mi)
- Elevation: 334 m (1,096 ft)

Population (2025-12-31)
  - Total: 830
  - Density: 120/km^{2} (310/sq mi)
- Time zone: UTC+01:00 (CET)
  - Summer (DST): UTC+02:00 (CEST)
- Postal codes: 66871
- Dialling codes: 06384
- Vehicle registration: KUS
- Website: www.konken.eu

Konken is an Ortsgemeinde – a municipality belonging to a Verbandsgemeinde, a kind of collective municipality – in the Kusel district in Rhineland-Palatinate, Germany. It belongs to the Verbandsgemeinde of Kusel-Altenglan, whose seat is in Kusel.

== Geography ==
=== Location ===
The municipality lies in the highlands in the Western Palatinate. With 833 inhabitants, Konken is, after Kusel and Pfeffelbach, the third biggest municipality in the Verbandsgemeinde. The long village of Konken lies roughly 330 m above sea level in a broad, flat-bottomed, seashell-shaped dale that opens towards the east and through which flows the Konker Bach in that same direction. The district seat of Kusel lies to the northeast. In the south and east, the dale abuts a vista of four separate hills, known as the Hettersberg, the Rundwieshübel (404 m), the Harzberg or Harzhöhe (412 m) and the Konker Wart or Konker Warte (414 m). To the north, the other side of the dale is formed by a ridge coming from the west, on whose south slope most of the village stands. This climbs somewhat steeply up to an elevation of roughly 350 m above sea level. In the village’s east, where the ridge flattens out, the Konker Bach flows round in a broad bow into which the Weiherbach, coming from the south, empties within the village itself. Right near the church is found the core of the village. On the village’s north side, the Konker Bach empties into the eastward-flowing Albessbach at the Hasenmühle (“Hare’s Mill”), which is seated within Konken’s municipal limits. To the village’s north runs Autobahn A 62 (Kaiserslautern–Trier) with its Kusel interchange, which lies partly within Konken’s municipal limits. The major woodlands spread out to the village’s east and in the far west. The municipal area measures 704 ha, of which 10 ha is wooded.

=== Neighbouring municipalities ===
Konken borders in the north on the municipality of Ehweiler, in the east on the municipality of Schellweiler, in the southeast on the municipality of Hüffler, in the south on the municipalities of Wahnwegen and Herschweiler-Pettersheim, in the southwest on the municipality of Langenbach and in the northwest on the municipality of Albessen. Konken also meets the municipality of Selchenbach at a single point in the west.

=== Constituent communities ===
Also belonging to Konken are the outlying homestead of Rundwieserhof and the commercial park Erlenhöhe.

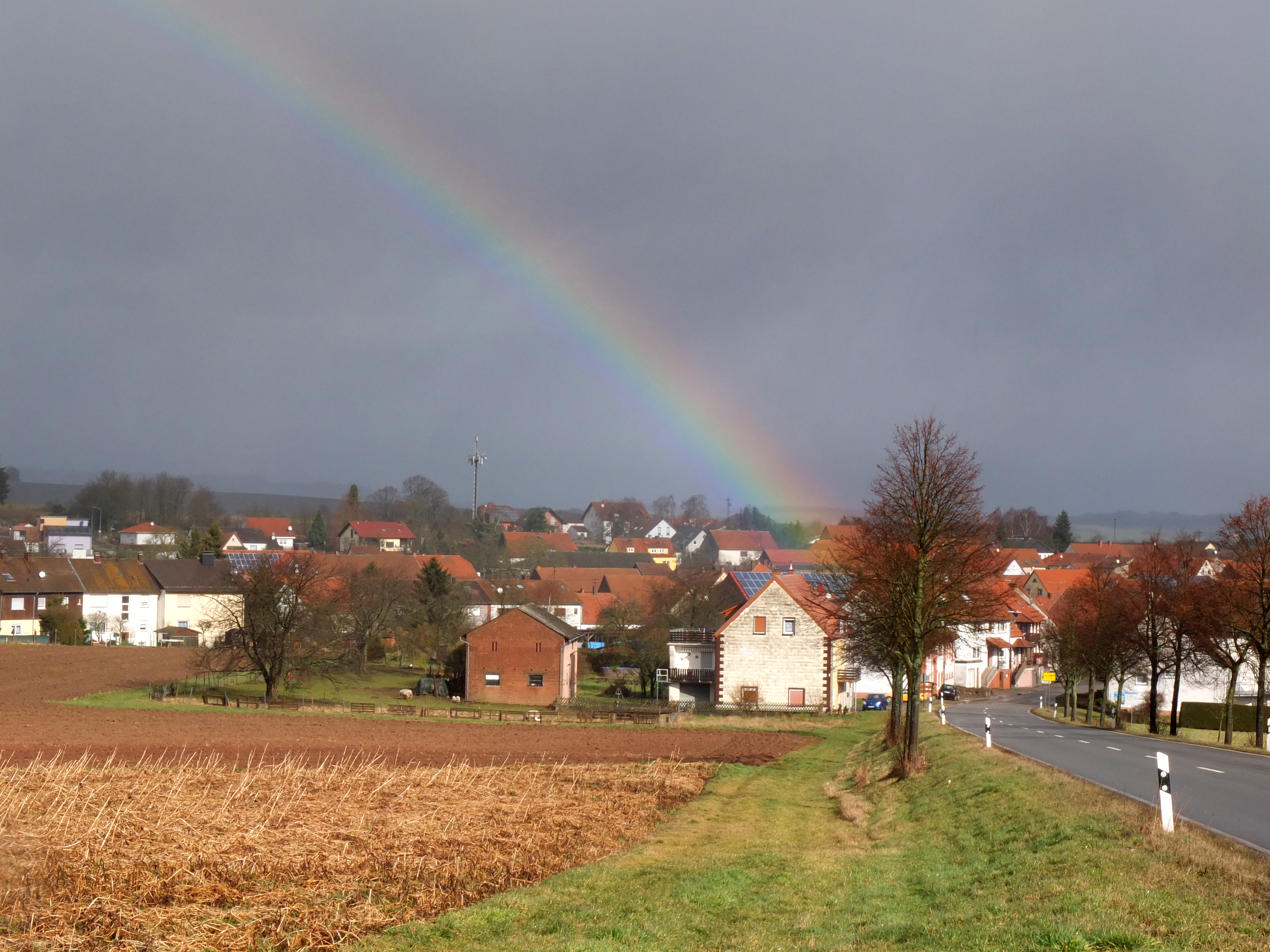
Rainbow over Konken, February 2014.

=== Municipality’s layout ===
Originally, Konken was a long, narrow linear village (or by some definitions, a “thorpe”) along its through road, which is nowadays called Bundesstraße 420. There were, however, already settled sidestreets by the turn of the 19th century. Sprouting off the main street to the north are Kirchstraße (“Church Street”), at whose corner stands the church with its mediaeval tower, Friedhofsstraße (“Graveyard Street”), at whose upper end lies the graveyard, and Hohlstraße (“Hollow Street”), at what was then the village’s western end. Likewise as far back as the early 19th century, residential developments sprang up on Wahnweger-Straße and Straße Im Eck. All these residential areas spread in the course of the 19th century and early 20th century. In the time after the Second World War, new building zones opened up, mainly in the village’s north. The old, long-settled neighborhoods are still characterized by a few of the Einfirsthäuser (houses with a single roof ridge), which as a rule stand with the eaves facing the street, and which are so typical of the Westrich, a historic region that encompasses areas in both Germany and France. An old schoolhouse, which was used as such until 1965, stands on the through road. It has served as a savings bank (Sparkasse) and a postal agency, but is now used by a newspaper business. A new schoolhouse, dedicated in 1965, stands at the village’s northern edge. Farther northeast lies the sporting ground. Outside the village’s own built-up area, near the Kusel Autobahn interchange, is a commercial-industrial area called Erlenhöhe. The outlying Rundwieserhof homestead lies on the Rundwieshübel’s northern slope on Langenbacher Weg (a road), while the Hasenmühle (“Hare’s Mill”) can be found just outside the built-up area on the Konker Bach right before the Autobahn.

== History ==
=== Antiquity ===
Archaeological finds bear witness to prehistoric human habitation in the environs. Within almost every neighbouring municipality’s limits, untouched prehistoric graves have been unearthed, while in Konken itself, it is suspected that there are such graves in the Hohe Warte area. Richer have been finds in Konken from Gallo-Roman times. Building work in 1966 brought to light the remnants of a villa rustica when its foundations were dug up. Artefacts were unearthed there as well, such as coins and ceramics, as well as a terra sigillata plate with the stamped inscription VERECUNDUS. Some of these finds were given to the museum in Speyer while others ended up in private ownership. There have also been finds from several other estates.

=== Middle Ages ===
Konken is without a doubt one of the oldest places in the so-called Remigiusland. In the 9th-century holding and taxation register kept by the Abbey of Saint-Remi in Reims, the Polyptique, one can read:

Census de Conchis. Uno anno XX solidos et VIIII denarios et obulum. In festo Sancti Martini iiii liberas et iii solidos; de sartis iii solidos. Medio martio v solidos de capitalicio. Ad natale Domini x solidos; de oblationibus pullos xxv; cum unoquoque x ova … de mappagiis xxv modios et dimidium de avena, de siligine xii modios et dimidium.

While this in itself is a rather dull recitation of taxes levied on the village, it does offer a window on Konken’s early past. Translated from the Mediaeval Latin, it comes out as follows:

Revenues from Konken: in one year 20 solidi and 8 denarii and a small donation. At Saint Martin’s festival 4 pounds and 3 solidi; from the workers 3 solidi, in mid-March 5 solidi in capital. On the Lord’s birthday 10 solidi; in chickens 25; at the same time also 10 eggs … furthermore 25 and a half bushels of oats, in legumes 12 and a half bushels.

It is unclear, however, which standard of “bushel” was being used. Nevertheless, what is indeed clear is that when the figures given here for Konken are compared against those for the eighteen other Remigiusland places listed in this Polyptique, Konken comes out as one of the wealthiest places in the whole region. The name’s pre-Germanic origins might lead one to the assumption that there was continuous settlement in what is now Konken beginning in Gallo-Roman times. The name “Konken”, though, furnishes no such proof. Theoretically, it could be a settlement from Gallo-Roman times, but what is likelier is that it arose in Frankish times, and simply has a pre-Germanic name drawn from a name still borne at that time by a local waterway. According to this view, Konken would have arisen as a Germanic village in its seashell-shaped dale whose pre-Germanic name was still known. Be that as it may, the village is still surely one of the oldest places in the countryside around Kusel. The time when the village actually arose, however, cannot be ascertained through documents. It is believed that a village grew up bit by bit around a chapel. It was throughout the Middle Ages as seat of an Unteramt and as the hub of a parish always a place of greater importance than many. In 1112, Count Gerlach I, a scion of the Counts of the Nahegau, founded the new County of Veldenz and also exercised the Schutzvogtei (roughly “lord protectorship”) over the Remigiusland. In 1124, Archbishop Adalbert of Mainz confirmed to Abbot Odo of the Abbey of Saint-Remi in Reims the Church of Kusel with its three affiliated churches in Konken, Altenglan and Pfeffelbach. In 1270, Heinrich von Geroldseck founded the Younger Line of Veldenz. In a 1326 document, Count Georg of Veldenz obliged the “Amt of Konken” to pay the knight Sir Harnisch of Bitsch a yearly amount of 100 Heller. That the Amt of Concken also had to pay the knight Sir Johann of Randeck, one of Count of Veldenz Heinrich II’s Burgmannen, 15 pounds in Heller is something that comes to light in a 1339 document. At that time, the count’s young wife, Agnes, was granted the Amt of Konken as a morning gift. All five Schultheißen (head officials in the Unterämter) in the Remigiusland appear in a 1385 document from Counts Heinrich III and Friedrich II of Veldenz, among them one named as “Clays in Concken”. In 1444, the County of Veldenz met its end when Count Friedrich III of Veldenz died without a male heir. His daughter Anna wed King Ruprecht’s son Count Palatine Stephan. By uniting his own Palatine holdings with the now otherwise heirless County of Veldenz – his wife had inherited the county, but not her father’s title – and by redeeming the hitherto pledged County of Zweibrücken, Stephan founded a new County Palatine, as whose comital residence he chose the town of Zweibrücken: the County Palatine – later Duchy – of Palatinate-Zweibrücken. Beginning in the Middle Ages, Konken was a market centre. From all over the region came the dealers and farmers to the Martinimarkt (“Saint Martin’s Day Market”). Later a Sommermarkt (“Summer Market”) was also held. By the mid 18th century, marketgoers could reach the market on one of the district’s few paved roads.

=== Modern times ===
Konken now shared the Duchy’s history until this new state itself came to an end in the time of the French Revolution. Surviving from 1556 is a Weistum from the village (a Weistum – cognate with English wisdom – was a legal pronouncement issued by men learned in law in the Middle Ages and early modern times) which deals mainly with how high the taxes were that had to be paid. Like all the Kusel region’s villages, Konken, too, suffered greatly from the Plague and the Thirty Years' War, the latter being particularly frightful in the Konken area. According to an Oberamt of Lichtenberg ecclesiastical organizational protocol, in 1609 – nine years before the war – there were 127 inhabitants living in Konken, all of whose names were recorded. As a rule, no village in the region had anywhere near 100 inhabitants. The village’s importance could also be seen in the taxes assessed for it, which were notably higher than for the neighbouring villages. During the Thirty Years' War, though, all the inhabitants left the village. Most were likely killed, particularly given the 1635 massacre by Croatian troops from the Imperial army, and in the end, Konken, along with its church, was burnt down. After the war ended in 1648, newcomers mainly from Switzerland and the Tyrol bolstered the now almost annihilated pre-war population, although some of the refugees came back, too. By 1675, Konken once again had nine families and roughly 36 inhabitants. Then, towards the end of the 17th century came the plundering by French King Louis XIV’s troops, which further reduced the population. From that time onwards, however, steady expansion with strong population growth set in, and already by the 18th century, some villagers were leaving to seek their fortunes abroad.

==== Recent times ====
In the time of Napoleonic French rule from 1801 to 1814, the village was the seat of a mairie (“mayoralty”) in the Department of Sarre, the Arrondissement of Birkenfeld and the Canton of Kusel. The Congress of Vienna grouped the region in 1816 with the Kingdom of Bavaria. In this Bavarian time that followed, beginning in 1818, Konken became the seat of a Bürgermeisterei (“mayoralty”) within the Baierischer Rheinkreis (“Bavarian Rhine District”), the Landkommissariat (later Bezirksamt, then Landkreis) of Kusel and the Canton of Kusel. Later, the cantons only had a very minor meaning. In the course of administrative restructuring in Rhineland-Palatinate in 1968, the mayoralty of Konken was dissolved on 1 January 1972. Since then, Konken has formed an Ortsgemeinde within the Verbandsgemeinde of Kusel. In 1999, Konken celebrated what was at the time believed to be the 875th anniversary of its first documentary mention (1124), at which time a comprehensive village chronicle was also published.

=== Population development ===
Konken was originally said to be purely a farming village, but in the late 18th century, the share of the population held by workers was rising steadily, and by the First World War, they were in the majority. Going by religious affiliation, Evangelical Christians predominate even today. There was a Jewish community in the village quite early on. Comparatively, even today a great portion of the population earns its livelihood at agriculture, although as a whole, the inhabitants work at the most varied of occupations, and many must seek jobs elsewhere. Between 1825 and 1961, the population figures doubled, whereas the growth curve flattened significantly in the 20th century.

The following table shows population development over the centuries for Konken, with some figures broken down by religious denomination:

Year	1609	1825	1835	1871	1905	1939	1961	2000	2003	2007
Total	127	397	552	668	734	738	800	900	~860	762
Catholic		–					14
Evangelical		350					773
Jewish		47					–
Other		–					13

=== Municipality’s name ===
It is highly likely that the name Konken is of Celtic origin, although it clearly did not arise from a pre-Germanic settlement. The name appeared as early as the 9th century in the Polyptique kept by the Abbey of Saint-Remi in Reims in the form Conchis, and again in an 1124 document as Chonchis. Other forms that cropped up in later records are Concham (1152), Concka (1270), Kuncke (1298), Conken (1304), Kuncha (1328), Kuncken (1377) and Konken (1824). The word originally meant “seashell”, which may well have been a reference to the broad, seashell-shaped dale in which the village lies. Local historians, however, have derived the name from the Latin conca, with its similar meaning of oyster, scallop or more broadly mollusk, apparently also a reference to the local geography. A seashell also stands as a charge in the municipality’s coat of arms.

== Religion ==
In the Remigiusland, Konken was subject to the lordship of either the Bishopric of Reims or the Abbey of Saint-Remi in Reims, but in terms of ecclesiastical organization, it belonged to the Archbishopric of Mainz. Either way, the village was the hub of a parish. It is unknown when a church was first built in Konken, but it was likely in the Early Middle Ages. If the church that still stands now goes back to 1124, then there must once have been an older one. The church’s patron saint before the Reformation was Vitus (or locally, Veith). The mediaeval nave was replaced in 1771 with a spacious aisleless church. The old tower was kept, but later also underwent considerable alterations. Also belonging to the parish, besides Konken, were the villages of Albessen, Herchweiler, Herschweiler, Krottelbach (the part to the left of the brook), Langenbach, Unter-Selchenbach and Pettersheim. There were changes now and then, but in general, this arrangement is the one that held true. After the Reformation was introduced, which was binding on everyone, the hitherto autonomous parish of Quirnbach also long belonged to Konken, bringing along with it not only Quirnbach, but also Frutzweiler, Liebsthal, Rehweiler, Sangerhof and Trahweiler. As well as the 1556 Weistum mentioned above, an ecclesiastical one (a Kirchenweistum) has also survived from the Church of Konken. By the principle of cuius regio, eius religio, all the villagers had to convert in 1523 to Lutheranism, and in 1588, at Count Palatine Johannes I’s behest, everyone had to convert again, this time to Calvinism. In the times of the Thirty Years' War and French King Louis XIV’s wars of conquest, the parish of Niederkirchen in the Oster valley was likewise attached to the Church of Konken, although it was split away again as a parish in its own right in 1710. The parish of Quirnbach, too, along with all the villages associated with it, was eventually split off to become autonomous again once the population had grown so quickly in the 18th and 19th centuries. Even though other denominations were once again allowed after the Thirty Years' War, the villagers all remained Reformed (Calvinist) up to the merger of the Calvinist and Lutheran Churches in the 1818 Palatine Union. Roman Catholic Christians settled sporadically only in the course of the 19th century. Even today, Konken is the hub of a major Evangelical church community within the deaconry of Kusel, while Catholics belong to the Catholic church community and the Catholic deaconry of Kusel. Since there were formerly many Jews living in the village, Judaism earned itself some importance. In the Duchy of Palatinate-Zweibrücken before the Thirty Years' War, Jews stood under strict surveillance. They were allowed to “...lend usuriously neither a townsman nor a subject something, whether by pledge, or on the strength of jewels or clothes, or chattels or real property, without the authorities’ foreknowledge and approval.” They were once even forbidden the right to represent themselves in court. Under these circumstances, only a few Jews settled in the principality at first, which is not to say that they did not come in greater numbers later, towards the end of the 17th century, despite lingering reprisals, settling mostly in bigger villages and smaller towns as tradesmen. Many of them lived with a minimal livelihood. A few of them amassed great fortunes through trade, but very few of them ever made careers of being officials. With a population that was just short of 10% Jewish in 1825, Konken, at the time in the Oberamt of Lichtenberg, was said to be a village with a particularly high Jewish population (Odenbach was 8% Jewish and Steinbach, then Leyen domain, though, was 29% Jewish). There was strong Jewish migration in the early 19th century. In 1835, there were 85 Jews in Konken, almost 15% of the inhabitants at that time. To this great Jewish community, which also comprised some Jews outside the village, belonged a Judenschultheiß. There was a synagogue in Konken, which was most likely built in the earlier half of the 19th century. By the latter half of the 19th century, though, the Jewish population was already beginning to shrink. There were still 24 Jews living in Konken in 1919, but by 1933, the same year that Adolf Hitler and the Nazis seized power, only 14 were still living in the village. After 1933, most of those remaining left the village. The last Jewish inhabitant was taken away by the Nazis in 1940 and deported to the Gurs internment camp in the South of France.

== Politics ==
=== Municipal council ===
The council is made up of 12 council members, who were elected by proportional representation at the municipal election held on 7 June 2009, and the honorary mayor as chairman.

The municipal election held on 7 June 2009 yielded the following results:

Year	SPD	WGR	Total
2009	5	7	12 seats
2004	by majority vote		12 seats

“WGR” is a voters’ group.

=== Mayor ===
Konken’s mayor is Karl Friedrich Knecht.

=== Coat of arms ===
The German blazon reads: Über erhöhtem, silbernem Schildfluß, darin eine blaue Muschel, aus der eine rote Flamme lodert, in Schwarz ein rotbewehrter, -bezungter und -bekrönter, goldener Löwe.

The municipality’s arms might in English heraldic language be described thus: Per fess abased sable a lion rampant Or armed, langued and crowned gules and argent an escallop’s edge, open to chief, issuant from which fire proper.

The upper charge is the Bavarian Lion, and it is drawn from a former coat of arms borne by the municipality bearing only this charge in the same tinctures (thus “Sable a lion rampant Or armed, langued and crowned gules”). The shell is said to be a canting charge for the village’s name (see Municipality’s name above). The arms have been borne since 1986 when they were approved by the now defunct Rheinhessen-Pfalz Regierungsbezirk administration in Neustadt an der Weinstraße.

== Culture and sightseeing ==
=== Buildings ===
The following are listed buildings or sites in Rhineland-Palatinate’s Directory of Cultural Monuments:

- Protestant parish church, Hauptstraße 20 – Romanesque former flanking quire tower, the three uppermost floors less old; aisleless church on stone-block pedestal, marked 1771, architect Church Steward Koch, Kusel; furnishings, Stumm organ from 1889
- Friedhofstraße, at the graveyard – warriors’ memorial 1914-1918, marked 1921, by Emil and Eugen Reis, Kusel
- Hauptstraße 12 – stately Quereinhaus (a combination residential and commercial house divided for these two purposes down the middle, perpendicularly to the street) with separate commercial building, 1909; characterizes village’s appearance
- Hauptstraße 33 – stately three-sided estate, 1910, architect Christoph Berndt, Kusel; sandstone-framed building with half-hipped roof; behind, commercial buildings
- Kirchenstraße 5 – stately Quereinhaus, possibly from the latter half of the 19th century, expansion 1908; characterizes street’s appearance
- Selchenbacher Straße 2 – sandstone-framed Quereinhaus, essentially possibly from the 18th century, renovation 1892; characterizes village’s appearance

=== Regular events ===
Konken holds its four-day-long kermis (church consecration festival) on the last weekend in August. Straußbuben (“Bouquet Lads”) decorate a bouquet and carry it through the village, after which the Straußrede (“Bouquet Speech”) is given. Another custom that is still kept is the Wanderstag (“Hiking Day”, 27 December), on which the young men go about while the locals offer them schnapps. Other old customs, however, are slowly being forgotten. Ever less often nowadays do children go door to door with a toy gun “shooting” the New Year in. In earlier days, the children would receive a great big pretzel for their efforts, although more recently the reward has been money. On Epiphany, at Shrovetide (Fastnacht) and at Whitsuntide, too, children demand small gifts. At this last holiday, the children observe a custom called the Pfingstquack (“Whitsun” is Pfingsten in German). The —quack part of the custom’s name refers to a rhyme that the children recite as they go door to door begging for money with their gorse-decked wagon. The rhyme generally begins with the line “Quack, Quack, Quack”. Further customs are detailed in Rudi Häßel’s Chronik der Gemeinde Konken, a village chronicle.

=== Clubs ===
The following clubs are currently active in Konken:

- Arbeiterwohlfahrt — workers’ welfare
- Freiwillige Feuerwehr — volunteer fire brigade
- Gesangverein “Harmonie” — singing club
- Landfrauenverein — countrywomen’s club
- Musikverein 1960 (Westricher Musikanten) — music club
- Obst- und Gartenbauverein — fruitgrowing and gardening club
- Protestantischer Kirchengesangverein — Protestant church singing club
- Rot-weiße Teufel Konken — “Red-White Devils” (1. FC Kaiserslautern fan club)
- Skatclub 18-20 — skat club
- SPD-Ortsverein — Social Democratic Party of Germany local chapter
- Sportverein 1920 — sport club
- VdK — advocacy group (local chapter) for veterans, the handicapped and pensioners

== Economy and infrastructure ==
=== Economic structure ===
Agriculture characterized Konken’s economic life in earlier times. It was once purely a farming village with craft industries that saw to its needs. There were smiths, wainwrights, shoemakers and a nailer. Here, too, though, there was a shift in living circumstances as there was in almost every other village in the Kusel area with advancing industrialization in the 19th and 20th centuries. Throughout the 20th century, the number of agricultural operations steadily shrank. The ones that were left then became bigger. Smaller farms kept running at first as secondary businesses, but likewise slowly disappeared as their owners gave up farming. Thus, only a few big farms were left, some of which specialized in certain kinds of agriculture, among others, pig farming and cattle farming. Meanwhile, Konken had a watermain by 1909; electric light had to wait until 1922. The craft and other businesses serving this farming village, which were well developed before the Second World War, likewise reached a sharp downturn, although it should be borne in mind that while the old craft business were vanishing, new businesses more suited to the new economy were coming in to replace them. Particularly worthy of mention is the Haus der kulinarischen Landstraße (“House of the Culinary Highway”). Also after the war, a village with both farmers and workers slowly developed. The latter earned their living as miners, ironworkers and quarrymen. They sometimes also had a small agricultural operation of sorts alongside their main jobs: they kept goats. Work began in 1953 on laying sewerage, and in 1965, a sewage treatment plant was completed. Two new building areas were opened: Auf der Leinkaut, and later the smaller Hottergaß. Another new building area, which would be the biggest, Breitwies/Flur, with 40 building lots, is in the planning stage. In the 1980s, the commercial-industrial park Viererbenwald came into being. A boon for Konken was the opening, in cooperation with the Verbandsgemeinde of Kusel, of the industrial-commercial park called Erlenhöhe right by the Autobahn interchange (thus affording favourable transport links), making Konken one of the few major industrial locations in the district (roughly 280 jobs in industry, crafts and trade). More than ten craft and industrial businesses soon opened there. Among businesses that have located themselves at the park are a waste management firm, a butcher supplier and a car distribution centre. Locals can therefore get jobs in the village itself. Thus, it is also clear that commuting has risen over the course of the decades, but there has been a rise in inbound commuting as well as outbound. A biogas-powered local heating network is under construction.

=== Education ===
In Konken, the hub of a great parish, a school arose as early as the 16th century. Classes were taught by the pastor himself. In 1575, the bellringer was to have taken over the teaching, but the deal fell through when it turned out that he was only to be paid six Rhenish guilders each year over and above what he earned as a bellringer. It could be that schooling was given up in the course of time, for until 1685, records were no longer mentioning a school. From that time onwards, every schoolteacher’s name is known. Schoolchildren from neighbouring villages, too, were allowed to attend the Konken school, until in the course of the 18th century winter schools (schools geared towards an agricultural community’s practical needs, held in the winter, when farm families had a bit more time to spare) were set up in the parish’s outlying villages. In 1740, the municipality decided to renovate the schoolhouse, which by that time had fallen into disrepair. The work took several years. Within the framework of general school renovation in Bavarian times, a schoolhouse came into being in 1822/1823 with two classrooms and a staff dwelling. Throughout the time until 1965, the schoolteachers were all Protestant. There came another school building in 1928, to be used as the teacher’s dwelling, but after the Second World War, it housed the municipal administration’s offices. In 1965, a new school built to an ample design opened in the village’s north end, but it was only used as a school for all Konken’s children until 1972, for the new policy of centralizing schools was coming into effect. Hauptschule students were now to attend school in Herschweiler-Pettersheim, although later they had to go to the Roßberg in Kusel. Today, the Konken schoolhouse teaches primary school pupils from Konken itself and from the neighbouring villages of Albessen, Ehweiler, Herchweiler and Selchenbach. Other kinds of higher schools and special schools are to be found in Kusel. Konken also has one kindergarten.

=== Public institutions ===
Konken has a multipurpose hall.

=== Transport ===
Konken lies on Autobahn A 62 (Kaiserslautern–Trier) right near the Kusel interchange on the way out of the village going northwards. Through the village itself runs Bundesstraße 420. Branching off the Bundesstraße are Landesstraße 350 (Konken-Brücken) and Kreisstraßen 15 (Konken-Albessen) and 16 (Konken-Ehweiler). These favourable transport links bode well for further economic development. The nearest station is Kusel station, which is the terminus of the Landstuhl–Kusel railway, connecting to Kaiserslautern and is served by an hourly Regionalbahn service RB 67, called the Glantalbahn (the name of which refers to the Glan Valley Railway, which shared some of the route of the Landstuhl–Kusel line).

== Famous people ==
=== Sons and daughters of the town ===
- Philipp Casimir Heintz (b. 1777 in Konken; d. 1835 in Munich) — Evangelical theologian, pastor and professor for religious studies, city pastor in Munich, historical researcher with specialization in the Duchy of Palatinate-Zweibrücken, Knight of the Royal Swedish Order of Vasa, compiler of a series of regional history books.

=== Famous people associated with the municipality ===
- Ferdinand Hahn (b. 1926 in Kaiserslautern) — Theologian, first holder of pastor’s seat in Konken 1955/1956, Professor at Heidelberg University, Kiel University, the University of Mainz and LMU Munich, publisher and co-publisher of many important theological-scientific works.
