= Ehweiler =

- Municipality
- Coat of arms

- Location of Ehweiler within Kusel district
- Interactive map of Ehweiler
- Location within Germany Location within Rhineland-Palatinate
- Coordinates: 49°31′16″N 7°21′38″E
- Country: Germany
- State: Rhineland-Palatinate
- District: Kusel
- Municipal assoc.: Kusel-Altenglan

Government
  - Mayor (2019–24): Stefan Reusemann

Area
  - Total: 3.57 km^{2} (1.38 sq mi)
- Elevation: 320 m (1,050 ft)

Population (2025-12-31)
  - Total: 171
  - Density: 47.9/km^{2} (124/sq mi)
- Time zone: UTC+01:00 (CET)
  - Summer (DST): UTC+02:00 (CEST)
- Postal codes: 66871
- Dialling codes: 06384
- Vehicle registration: KUS

Ehweiler is an Ortsgemeinde – a municipality belonging to a Verbandsgemeinde, a kind of collective municipality – in the Kusel district in Rhineland-Palatinate, Germany. It belongs to the Verbandsgemeinde of Kusel-Altenglan, whose seat is in Kusel.

== Geography ==
=== Location ===
The municipality lies 5 km southwest of Kusel some 330 m above sea level in a hollow of the Korbach, which rises in the municipality's west from several springs, and empties in the municipality's southeast into the Albessbach. In the municipal area's north, another stream flows parallel to the Korbach in the Ehweiler Grund, which also forms the municipal limit. The heights around the village climb up to almost 400 m above sea level (Ehweiler Höhe 390 m), and beyond the municipal limit reach higher than 400 m (Anieshügel 429 m). In the southwest and south, Autobahn A 62 (Kaiserslautern–Trier) touches the municipal limit. The municipal area measures 360 ha, of which 33 ha is wooded.

=== Neighbouring municipalities ===
Ehweiler borders in the north on the town of Kusel (Ortsteil: Bledesbach), in the east on the municipality of Schellweiler, in the south on the municipality of Konken, in the west on the municipality of Albessen and in the northwest on the municipality of Pfeffelbach.

=== Municipality’s layout ===
The village of Ehweiler is made up of two parts of roughly the same size, one north of the Korbach and one south. These may once have been two settled areas on a road running through this spot, but nowadays, the village's structure is rather more like a clump village.

== History ==
=== Antiquity ===
Bearing witness to Stone Age human habitation in the Ehweiler area are various archaeological finds. Unearthed on the Ameshübel (or Anishügel – a hill) northwest of Ehweiler – actually beyond the municipal limit and into Albessen’s municipal area – on land that was later settled by Gallo-Romans was an agate borer, which is now kept by the Office for the Study of Archaeological Monuments (Amt für Archäologische Denkmalkunde) in Speyer. Within Ehweiler's own municipal area lie four barrows in the forest and on meadowland northeast of the village, laid out from east to west, whose origins are thus far undetermined. As early as the 19th century, there was apparently a Roman find, namely a stone with a Latin inscription, whose whereabouts are, however, unknown today. In 1957, forestry workers discovered foundations that likely stem from a Roman settlement. The same site yielded nails, potsherds and bits of brick, which were given to the Kusel local history museum.

=== Middle Ages ===
Ehweiler lay in the so-called Remigiusland. The local chronicler, Rainer Dick, tried to link the village's founding to its founder's name, as the name Agio or Ago was already customary by the 5th century. Researchers Dolch and Greule, on the other hand, note that the great majority of the villages with names ending in —weiler arose no earlier than the 12th century. In 1316, Ehweiler had its first documentary mention, at a time by which it had certainly already existed for quite some time. According to the document in question, the pastor Luccemann from Kusel forwent his tithes from a whole series of villages, among them Ehweiler, choosing instead to grant them to the monastery on the Remigiusberg. The village's name otherwise does not appear at all throughout the time in which the Counts of Veldenz held sway, but only once again after 1444, when that comital house died out and the new rulers, the Counts Palatine (Dukes) of Zweibrücken, took over as successors to the Veldenzes.

=== Modern times ===
The village of Ehweiler now shared a history with the Duchy of Palatinate-Zweibrücken, right up until that state was swept away by the events of the French Revolution. Like all villages in the Kusel region, Ehweiler, too, suffered heavily under the hardships and woe wrought by the Thirty Years' War and the Plague. In the late 16th century, there may have been well under one hundred people living in the village. While one or two deaths in the village were usual in most years, in the Plague Year 1583 alone, 34 people in Ehweiler died (as against 23 in Kusel). In 1597, there were 12 Plague deaths (165 in Kusel), and in 1613, there were a further 13 (56 in Kusel). Thus, by 1583, half the village's population must have died. Nevertheless, newcomers must have quickly settled in Ehweiler. In 1609, according to an Oberamt of Baumholder ecclesiastical visitation protocol, there were 56 inhabitants in 12 families with the following family heads: Censor Bastian Peters (whose main occupation was likely farming), David Strohschneider (whose last name means “Strawcutter” in German, which was apparently his actual occupation), farmers Hans Peter, Johannes Kickel, Hans Hannesen, Johannes Tury and Clas Veltin (also a strawcutter in his secondary occupation), linen weaver Abraham Heilmann, day labourers Hans Hinterer, Bartel Hans and Johannes Hansen and shepherd Hans Schwarz. Also listed were David Martin's widow and the widower Bartel Klein. In the years after 1613 until the worst devastation during the Thirty Years' War, a remarkable number of children were born in Ehweiler. In 1614 alone, it was seven. This owed itself to the young families among the newcomers who had settled. After 1635, the village had been laid waste, like almost all villages in the Kuseler Land, and then once again, new settlers came. Beginning in 1640, life returned to normalcy, but then came French King Louis XIV’s wars of conquest, during which Ehweiler was once again burnt down, and there were the attendant considerable population losses. In the 18th century, life returned to normalcy once again, and this is when emigration began.

==== Recent times ====
In the time of French rule between 1801 and 1814, Ehweiler lay in the Department of Sarre (Saar), the Arrondissement of Birkenfeld, the Canton of Kusel and the Mairie (“Mayoralty”) of Kusel. In 1814, the French withdrew from the German lands on the Rhine's left bank, and after Napoleon's defeat at Waterloo, the Congress of Vienna in 1816, after a transitional period, awarded the Baierische Rheinkreis (“Bavarian Rhenish District”), which was later known as the Bayerische Rheinpfalz (“Bavarian Rhenish Palatinate”), to the Kingdom of Bavaria, whose kings were descended from Charles II August, effectively Zweibrücken's last duke (the territory was occupied by the French when the last duke, his brother Maximilian, inherited the duchy). Ehweiler thus became Bavarian and there was yet another administrative arrangement. Ehweiler now lay in the Landkommissariat (later Bezirksamt, then Landkreis or “district”) of Kusel and at the same time in the canton of Kusel. Cantons later had little meaning, and Bürgermeistereien were more important. Ehweiler now belonged to the Bürgermeisterei (“Mayoralty”) of Kusel. In the early 1930s, the Nazi Party (NSDAP) was quite popular in Ehweiler. In the 1930 Reichstag elections, 22.4% of the local votes went to Adolf Hitler’s party. By the time of the 1933 Reichstag elections, after Hitler had already seized power, local support for the Nazis had swollen to 90%. Hitler’s success in these elections paved the way for his Enabling Act of 1933 (Ermächtigungsgesetz), thus starting the Third Reich in earnest. In the course of the 1968 administrative restructuring in Rhineland-Palatinate, the village was grouped into the Verbandsgemeinde of Kusel in 1972.

=== Population development ===
Ehweiler was until quite recently a farming village with relatively few workers. Agriculture has since lost its dominant role, and most people now must seek their livelihoods outside the village. Ehweiler is thus said to be a rural residential community. The population rose steeply in the 18th century and earlier half of the 19th century, and thereafter remained relatively stable.

The following table shows population development over the centuries for Ehweiler, with some figures broken down by religious denomination:

Year	1609	1825	1835	1871	1905	1939	1961	2003	2007
Total	56	206	213	242	258	253	220	231	271
Catholic	–	5					14
Evangelical	56	201					205
Other/None	–	–					1

=== Municipality’s name ===
According to researchers Dolch and Greule, the form that the village's name took in the 1316 first documentary mention, Eygewilre, was a combination of the common placename ending —weiler, meaning “hamlet” or, originally, “homestead”, with the personal name Ago, which in the genitive case became Egin. This would mean that the name's original meaning was “Ago’s Homestead”. Other forms of the name over the ages have been as follows: Ewilre (1446), Ewillr (1456), Eheweiler (1609).

=== Vanished villages ===
A former village named Grehweiler, which appeared in a document as early as 1296, likely lay northwest of today's village of Ehweiler (in 1296 and 1431 Grewilre, in 1446 Obergrewilre, in 1456 Grewillr). The name Obergrewilre suggests that for a while at least, the village had two centres (the prefix Ober— means “upper”; the other centre would have had the prefix Nieder— or Unter—, meaning “lower”). Already by 1588, Greweiler no longer existed. Johannes Hoffmann mentioned that such a village had once lain in the Grehweiler Grund (“Im Greweiler Grunde…”), likely the hollow now marked on the survey map as the Ehweiler Grund. Hoffmann, though, unambiguously described the land on both sides of the Korbach as Ehweiler Grund. This would yield a few hints as to just where the vanished village of Grehweiler lay. The former village of Stauderhof, whose name can still be seen in rural cadastral names in both Ehweiler and Albessen, quite likely lay within what are now Pfeffelbach’s limits. The vanished villages of Heupweiler and Dimschweiler likewise lay outside what are now Ehweiler's limits.

== Religion ==
Ehweiler lay in the Remigiusland and thereby was subject from its founding to the lordship of the Bishopric of Reims or the Abbey of Saint-Remi in Reims, although it belonged under ecclesiastical organization to the Archbishopric of Mainz. Under the principle of cuius regio, eius religio, all the inhabitants converted in the time of the Reformation, about 1537, to Lutheran beliefs. On Count Palatine Johannes I's orders in 1588, there was yet another conversion, this one to Calvinism. Thus the population was until the 1818 Palatine Union – which saw the merger of the Lutheran and Calvinist faiths – overwhelmingly Reformed. Other denominations, foremost among these Lutheranism and Catholicism, had been allowed since the end of the Thirty Years' War, but their numbers of followers were not very significant. Even before the Reformation, Ehweiler inhabitants had been attending church in Kusel. Today, the village's Protestants belong to the Evangelical parish and deaconry of Kusel, while the Catholics belong to the Catholic parish and deaconry of Kusel.

== Politics ==
=== Municipal council ===
The council is made up of 6 council members, who were elected by majority vote at the municipal election held on 7 June 2009, and the honorary mayor as chairman.

=== Mayor ===
Ehweiler's mayor is Stefan Reusemann and his deputy is Walter Rech.

=== Coat of arms ===
The German blazon reads: In Grün eine goldene Egge.

The municipality's arms might in English heraldic language be described thus: Vert a harrow Or.

A harrow was shown on an Ehweiler municipal seal as early as 1753. It is meant as a canting charge, which arose from the mistaken belief that the village was named after a harrow, known in the local speech as an Ee or Ehe (but Egge in Standard High German, as in the blazon above). As discussed above, the name much more likely comes from an early settler named Ago. Nevertheless, the harrow can be held to stand for the relatively fertile cropland around the village. The arms have been borne since 1983 when they were approved by the now defunct Rheinhessen-Pfalz Regierungsbezirk administration in Neustadt an der Weinstraße.

== Culture and sightseeing ==
=== Regular events ===
The village holds its kermis (church consecration festival) on the last weekend in July. Ehweiler is among those villages that still observe the peculiar Western Palatine custom known as the Pfingstquack, observed at Whitsun (Pfingsten in German); the —quack part of the custom's name refers to a rhyme that the children recite as they go door to door begging for money with their gorse-decked wagon. The rhyme generally begins with the line “Quack, Quack, Quack”.

=== Clubs ===
The municipality has a village community centre where municipal council meetings and cultural events, such as the well known “farmer’s theatre productions” (Bauerntheateraufführungen), are held. A men's singing club founded in the 19th century ceased operations about the turn of the 20th century, but was newly founded in 1925. It became a mixed singing club, but since then has once again ceased operations. There is also a leisure club in Ehweiler.

== Economy and infrastructure ==
=== Economic structure ===
In earlier days, agriculture defined the village's economic life, but nowadays plays only a subordinate role. During the 19th century, there was a colliery at the “Josephsgrube”, but the yield was quite low compared to that from other pits in the area. There were also several stone quarries within municipal limits, of which today only one is still in business. Ehweiler is otherwise a commuter village.

=== Education ===
Beginning in the time of the Reformation, the Prince-Electors were putting forth efforts to establish some kind of schooling. At first, this meant that perhaps once a week – or perhaps even only once every several weeks – there would be lessons in Ehweiler. This school system's shortcomings did not last long, for the whole system itself was swept away by the ravages of the Thirty Years' War. Hardly a school in the broader area was even left standing after various armies had swept through the region. The first indication in the historical record about a winter school (a school geared towards an agricultural community's practical needs, held in the winter, when farm families had a bit more time to spare) in Ehweiler comes from the 18th century. Teaching there in 1763 was a man named Johann Nikolaus Jung, and in 1780, it was another, named Johann Adam Jung. These two might have been a father and a son from Pfeffelbach. Johann Nikolaus Jung appeared in later records from Hundsbach near Meisenheim, and Johann Adam in later records from Nohfelden. Hindering the provision of winter school lessons in many of these small villages was a seemingly neverending dearth of teachers. Seminary students had to teach alongside their own studies, and thus in the winter of 1785, the teacher in Ehweiler was fourteen-year-old Friedrich Jakob Hilles, whose father was Nikolaus Hillig, who had been born in Thallichtenberg and who at the time of his son's teaching engagement in Ehweiler was the schoolteacher in Konken. In 1792, the schoolteacher was a man named Johann Theobald Theiß. A schoolhouse built in the 18th century was renovated in 1841 and served as such until the time after the Second World War. Today it is used as a block of flats. Further information about 19th-century schooling can be gleaned from the pertinent documents housed at the Speyer State Archive (Landesarchiv Speyer). A new schoolhouse was built about 1960; it is today the village community centre. Currently, primary school pupils attend school in Konken, while Hauptschule students attend classes in Kusel. Kusel is also the location of higher schools, the vocational college and special schools.

=== Transport ===
Ehweiler lies on Kreisstraße (District Road) 14, although the Autobahn A 62 (Kaiserslautern–Trier) running to the south and Bundesstraße 420 also cross through the municipal area. The Kusel Autobahn interchange lies within Ehweiler's limits. Serving nearby Kusel is Kusel station on the Landstuhl–Kusel railway. There are hourly trains at this station throughout the day, namely Regionalbahn service RB 67 between Kaiserslautern and Kusel, named Glantalbahn after a former railway line that shared a stretch of its tracks with the Landstuhl–Kusel railway.

== Famous people ==
=== Famous people associated with the municipality ===
- Fritz Wunderlich (b. 1930 in Kusel; d. 1966 in Heidelberg) – The tenor who would later become world-famous conducted the singing club in Ehweiler about 1950.
