= Albessen =

- Municipality
- Coat of arms

- Location of Albessen within Kusel district
- Interactive map of Albessen
- Location within Germany Location within Rhineland-Palatinate
- Coordinates: 49°31′07″N 7°19′48″E
- Country: Germany
- State: Rhineland-Palatinate
- District: Kusel
- Municipal assoc.: Kusel-Altenglan

Government
  - Mayor (2019–24): Traute Bortscher

Area
  - Total: 4.43 km^{2} (1.71 sq mi)
- Elevation: 360 m (1,180 ft)

Population (2025-12-31)
  - Total: 141
  - Density: 31.8/km^{2} (82.4/sq mi)
- Time zone: UTC+01:00 (CET)
  - Summer (DST): UTC+02:00 (CEST)
- Postal codes: 66871
- Dialling codes: 06384
- Vehicle registration: KUS
- Website: vg.kusel.de

Albessen is an Ortsgemeinde – a municipality belonging to a Verbandsgemeinde, a kind of collective municipality – in the Kusel district in Rhineland-Palatinate, Germany. It belongs to the Verbandsgemeinde of Kusel-Altenglan, whose seat is in Kusel.

== Geography ==
=== Location ===
Albessen lies near Kusel in the Westrich – an historic region that encompasses areas in both Germany and France – on the state boundary with the Saarland, at the foot of the lengthy mixed forest area known as the Albesser Hain, after the municipality (Hain means “grove” in German). The municipality has a mainly agricultural structure, and is the smallest municipality within the Verbandsgemeinde of Kusel.

Albessen lies some 370 m above sea level in the broad, fertile hollow of the Albessbach, which rises in the municipality's west, flowing down eastwards to the Konker Bach. The elevations each side of the hollow reach up beyond 400 m in some places. The highest, in the cadastral area called Rothöll, reaches 479 m above sea level. The wooded area within the municipality stretches from the southwest to the northeast. To the village's east, the Autobahn A 62 (Kaiserslautern–Trier) cuts across the municipal area. The municipal area measures 443 ha, of which 118 ha is wooded.

=== Neighbouring municipalities ===
Albessen borders in the north on the municipality of Pfeffelbach, in the northeast on the municipality of Ehweiler, in the southeast on the municipality of Konken, in the southwest on the municipality of Selchenbach, in the west on the municipality of Herchweiler and in the northwest on the town of Freisen in the Saarland. Albessen also meets the municipality of Langenbach at a single point in the south. Konken is home to the local telephone exchange for area code 06384, and also to a kindergarten, a general store, a bakery, a butcher's shop and a plant nursery.

=== Municipality’s layout ===
According to the 1845 cadastral plan, the village then still had two thoroughfares running parallel to the brook on each of the north and south sides. In the time that followed, the built-up area spread to a cross-street, then to the northeast towards Ehweiler and to the south, up to about 370 m above sea level. Thus the village grew into almost a typical clump village. The older parts of the municipality are particularly characterized by the Westrich farmhouse (Einfirsthaus – house with only one roof ridge). Two former schoolhouses are still standing, one in the village's north and the other in the south. On the road to Ehweiler, in the village's northeast, just before the Autobahn, lies the graveyard. The former Stauderhof (estate), whose name still crops up in cadastral names within Albessen, lay within Pfeffelbach's limits.

== History ==
=== Antiquity ===
Archaeological finds make clear that there were humans in the area as early as the Stone Age. Unearthed at the Ameshübel (or Anishügel – a hill) east of the Autobahn, on lands later also settled by the Gallo-Romans, was an agate borer, which is now kept by the Office for Archaeological Monument Care. Likewise from the Stone Age comes the piece of a blade made of reddish stone. While workers were building the Autobahn in 1939, they found a bronze ring. A group of barrows in the municipal area's southwest, partly within Selchenbach's and Herchweiler's limits, comes from the Iron Age. Many times, Roman coins and bricks from Roman times have been found, leading to the assumption that there might be a villa rustica hidden in the ground near the Anishügel. There is also speculation about a possible Roman town named Anissa (thus explaining the hill's name?). In the woods near Albessen, remnants of a Roman road are to be found.

=== Middle Ages ===
The interpretation of the village's name makes it rather unclear when Albessen was founded. Since pre-Germanic names of bodies of water were sometimes preserved in the region, there might possibly have been a very short time in settlement continuity between Gallo-Roman times and Frankish settlement. Nevertheless, it seems unlikely that a village of Albessen already existed in Gallo-Roman times. Likelier is that the brook's pre-Germanic name was preserved and then later applied to a newer settlement, one founded in the time when Germanic settlers were establishing themselves. Also to be considered is a theory, first set forth by Alsatian historian Adolf Schiber in the late 19th century, that areas with the body-of-water name “Alb” might have something to do with areas to which the Alamanni withdrew in the time just after their loss at the Battle of Tolbiac (Zülpich). In the so-called Polyptique, an early mediaeval taxation register kept by the Bishopric of Reims, however, no placename corresponding with “Albessen” can be found. Nevertheless, it could be that Albessen is a very old settlement that sprang up in the Early Middle Ages. Likelier, though, is that it is a founding that dates from later Frankish times. Written records about Albessen show that the village was dependent on the branch monastery of the Abbey of Saint-Remi in Reims and the County of Veldenz on the Remigiusberg, meaning that it lay in the so-called Remigiusland founded in the late 6th century, and in the County of Veldenz, whose counts had been the Schutzvögte (roughly, “protectors”) of the Remigiusland since 1112. The younger line of the Counts of Veldenz ended in 1444. The last count was Friedrich von Veldenz, whose daughter wed Stephen, Count Palatine of Simmern-Zweibrücken, who then took his own holdings, combined them with his wife's inheritance (the former County of Veldenz) and out of them founded the County Palatine of Zweibrücken.

=== Modern times ===
The village shared a history with the County Palatine of Zweibrücken up until its end in the time of the French Revolution. Like all villages in the region around Kusel, Albessen, too, suffered greatly under the effects of the Thirty Years' War. While there were 81 inhabitants living in the village in 1609, there may only have been a few left by the time the war ended. The population built itself back up with newcomers, although this took a while. During the time of French rule from 1801 to 1814, Albessen lay in the Department of Sarre, the Arrondissement of Birkenfeld, the Canton of Kusel and the Mairie (“Mayoralty”) of Konken. After Napoleonic times and the Congress of Vienna, when Albessen found itself in the Kingdom of Bavaria beginning in 1816, there was a new territorial arrangement. Within the Rheinkreis (that is, the Palatinate, which had now become a Bavarian exclave), the village now lay within the Landkommissariat (later Bezirksamt, then Landkreis or “rural district”) of Kusel and at the same time in the Canton of Kusel, as under Napoleonic rule. The cantons later had little meaning, with the Bürgermeistereien (“mayoralties”) having more importance. Albessen belonged to the Bürgermeisterei of Konken.

==== Recent times ====
The village came through both world wars comparatively unscathed, but there were casualties: four fallen in the First World War and 12 fallen and missing in the Second World War. In the Second World War, there was an air raid that damaged buildings and wounded several villagers. A district administrative commission that had been on hand to assess the damage from the air raid came under attack on the way back to Kusel by a ground-attack aircraft, and four members of the entourage were killed. The conservative rural populace, even before Adolf Hitler’s seizure of power in 1933, turned in majority numbers towards National Socialism. Early on, a thorough Flurbereinigung was undertaken in Albessen’s municipal area. In the course of administrative restructuring in Rhineland-Palatinate, Albessen was grouped into the Verbandsgemeinde of Kusel in 1968, with effect from 1 January 1972.

=== Population development ===
Albessen remained, even until the most recent past, a village characterized by agriculture, and going hand-in-hand with that, the villagers themselves were by a great majority characterized by a conservative mindset. There were once quarrymen, coalminers and ironworkers – the two last working in the Saarland – but also farmhands in the often huge agricultural operations. Especially in the 19th century, whole families emigrated to the United States. Today, the village is for most of the inhabitants only the place where they live. They seek work mainly in Kaiserslautern and Kusel. The population figure doubled between 1802 and 1825, but has remained fairly constant ever since.

The following table shows population development over the centuries for Albessen, with some figures broken down by religious denomination:

Year	1609	1802	1825	1835	1871	1905	1939	1961	1988	2007
Total	81	72	142	156	164	164	156	164	152	137
Catholic	–		11					16	23
Evangelical	81		131					148	118
Other	–		–					11

=== Municipality’s name ===
In the Historisches Siedlungsnamenbuch der Pfalz (“Historical Settlement Name Book of the Palatinate”) by Dolch and Greule, the placename Albessen is traced back to the pre-Germanic name of a body of water, Alb. According to this, the name Albessen means “settlement on a brook”. Versions of the name's history by other placename researchers who interpreted the name as “Albert’s settlement” would therefore be invalid. Forms of the name appearing in documents over time are, among others: Albeßen (1436 and 1460), Albersau and Albesen (1446), Albeßan (1456), Albesang (1460).

== Religion ==
Albessen lay in the Remigiusland, and thereby was subject to the lordship of the Bishopric of Reims, although ecclesiastical organization grouped it with the Archbishopric of Mainz. By the principle of cuius regio, eius religio, all the inhabitants had to convert to the Lutheran faith in the time of the Reformation, at least at first. Beginning in 1588, though, on Count Palatine Johannes I's orders, everybody had to convert to Calvinism. Even before the Reformation, worshippers from Albessen attended church in Konken, as Protestants still do today. The Catholic minority goes to church in Kusel. It is unknown whether there were ever Jews in Albessen. There are a very few humanist Christians in Albessen today. Some 10 inhabitants have left the church or make no claim of membership in any religious community.

== Politics ==
=== Municipal council ===
The council is made up of 6 council members, who were elected by majority vote at the municipal election held on 7 June 2009, and the honorary mayor as chairwoman.

=== Mayor ===
Albessen's mayor is Traute Bortscher, and her deputy is Kurt Müller.

=== Coat of arms ===
The German blazon reads: Durch Schrägwellenlinie von Gold und Grün geteilt, oben rechts ein grüner Eichenzweig mit einem grünen Blatt und zwei grünen Eicheln, unten links eine silberne Pflugschar.

The municipality's arms might in English heraldic language be described thus: Per bend wavy vert a ploughshare argent and Or an oak twig bendwise fructed of two and slipped of the first.

The ploughshare represents agriculture, while the oak twig stands for the mixed forest that covers roughly a fourth (about 100 ha) of the municipal area. The wavy partition is held to refer to the brook.

The arms have been borne since 1984 when they were approved by the now defunct Regierungsbezirk administration in Neustadt an der Weinstraße.

== Culture and sightseeing ==
=== Buildings ===
The following are listed buildings or sites in Rhineland-Palatinate’s Directory of Cultural Monuments:

- Burgweg 6 – one-floor sandstone-framed plastered building on high basement, 1909, architect Adam Schneider, Konken
- In der Alb 5 – three-sided complex; stately building with half-hipped roof, two stable-barns, 1906/1907, architect Christoph Berndt, Kusel

On the municipality’s highest hill once stood a Napoleonic optical telegraph station, whose remnants were given to a museum a few years ago.

=== Regular events ===
Each May Day, the maypole is raised next to the village pond, anchored fast to the ground with a permanent fitting. Fastened onto the pole are coats of arms of a few well known families, businesses and clubs, such as the Volkschor (choir) and the volunteer fire brigade. After the maypole has been put up, beer and grilled food are sold and there is celebration.

Cultural work exists to a great extent in collaboration with the village’s clubs. The kermis (church consecration festival) is celebrated on the third weekend in May. The custom of the Straußausrufen (“bouquet proclamation”) seems to be dying out, but the custom of the Pfingstquack still exists.

=== Clubs ===
Active clubs in Albessen are not as great in number as in many other villages of like size. However, there has been since 1973 the Volkschor (“People’s Choir”), to which for a while 70 active singers belonged, and there is also the club Fidele Dorfmusikanten (“Merry Village Musicians”). The other clubs are the Landfrauenverein (“Countrywomen’s Club”) and the volunteer fire brigade. There have been other clubs. After the Second World War, there was a cycling club. Singing clubs existed in the early 20th century, and then again from 1930 until the war broke out. A “village pond association” cares for a leisure complex and fosters angling as a leisure pursuit.

== Economy and infrastructure ==
=== Transport ===
The village lies on Kreisstraße (District Road) 14 while Bundesstraße 420 and the Autobahn A 62 (Kaiserslautern–Trier) both cross the municipal area. The Kusel Autobahn interchange lies 5 km away from the village. Serving nearby Kusel is Kusel station on the Landstuhl–Kusel railway. There are hourly trains at this station throughout the day, namely Regionalbahn service RB 67 between Kaiserslautern and Kusel, named Glantalbahn after a former railway line that shared a stretch of its tracks with the Landstuhl–Kusel railway.

=== Economic structure ===
Agriculture, which alone defined the village's economic life well into the 20th century, still plays an important part today. There are still a few full-time and part-time operations, even for organic farming. Otherwise, most members of the workforce must commute to jobs elsewhere, mainly to either Kusel or Kaiserslautern. In the past, there were unavailing attempts to mine chalk. More successful was the stone industry. At the Albessen quarry between 1928 and 1974, hard stone was quarried. For a time, the quarry employed 70 workers.

=== Established businesses ===
Albessen has a pub (in whose side room an Evangelical church service is held on the second Sunday of each month), three full-time farmers and one part-time one. One attraction often visited by school classes and other interested groups is a Bioland farm, the first one in Germany to be run as a joint-stock company. Also, there is one business that produces goat cheese and markets it itself.

=== Education ===
Beginning in the time of the Reformation, there arose efforts to school children everywhere in reading, writing and arithmetic, but above all, in Catechism. Thus, a school came into being quite early on in the parish seat of Konken. At first, the clergyman himself was the teacher, but later it was the bellringer. This “teacher” also taught in the parish's other villages. This meant that he taught perhaps once a week in Albessen – if the schoolchildren were lucky. Sometimes it was once in several weeks. It is likely that this system of schooling had been given up by the time of the Thirty Years' War. For a while in Konken soon after the war, the teaching post was once again filled, but often there was not the produce – for teachers were often paid in kind – to remunerate the teacher. The teacher's salary was raised throughout the parish. In Albessen, this meant that a villager had to pay the schoolteacher half a barrel of grain in the early 18th century for each child that he sent to school. In 1735, however, the village was relieved of school grain payments. This can only mean that the children neither received schooling in their own village, nor went to school down in Konken. Regular schooling did not come until the 19th century after Albessen had become Bavarian. In 1821, the first schoolhouse was built in Albessen, which given the rise in population and the attendant rising demand for schooling, was soon too small. It was not until 1891, however, that the municipality had a new schoolhouse built. During the Second World War, the village had no more teacher at its disposal, and schoolchildren had to make the half-hour trip to Konken. In 1965, the school was closed for good. There was a school strike, because no proper means of transportation was available to the schoolchildren. This problem was overcome after a short while. Today, primary school pupils attend school in Konken, while Hauptschule students travel to the Roßberg in Kusel. Also located in Kusel are secondary schools, a vocational school and special schools.

== Famous people ==
=== Famous people associated with the municipality ===
Jakob Dauber (b. 1829 in Osterbrücken, d. 1886 in Kusel) A teacher and a spare-time writer, Dauber composed many poems in both High German and the local speech, some of which he published under the pseudonym Freimund Jakob von Rechtenbach. In line with the events and outlooks of his time, these poetic works were to a great extent marked by patriotic pathos.
