= Selchenbach =

- Municipality
- Coat of arms

- Location of Selchenbach within Kusel district
- Interactive map of Selchenbach
- Location within Germany Location within Rhineland-Palatinate
- Coordinates: 49°29′45″N 7°17′46″E
- Country: Germany
- State: Rhineland-Palatinate
- District: Kusel
- Municipal assoc.: Kusel-Altenglan

Government
  - Mayor (2019–24): Dieter Edinger

Area
  - Total: 4.80 km^{2} (1.85 sq mi)
- Elevation: 385 m (1,263 ft)

Population (2025-12-31)
  - Total: 321
  - Density: 66.9/km^{2} (173/sq mi)
- Time zone: UTC+01:00 (CET)
  - Summer (DST): UTC+02:00 (CEST)
- Postal codes: 66871
- Dialling codes: 06384
- Vehicle registration: KUS

Selchenbach is an Ortsgemeinde – a municipality belonging to a Verbandsgemeinde, a kind of collective municipality – in the Kusel district in Rhineland-Palatinate, Germany. It belongs to the Verbandsgemeinde of Kusel-Altenglan, whose seat is in Kusel.

== Geography ==
=== Location ===
Selchenbach is a linear village – by some definitions a thorpe – that lies at the Oster valley in the Western Palatinate, right on the boundary with the Saarland. Selchenbach lies at an elevation of 380 to 390 m above sea level on the upper reaches of the Selchenbach. The Selchenbach itself rises south of the municipal area near the Königreicher Hof, flows through the village of Selchenbach and then the village of Herchweiler to the north and then turns in a broad bow back south, emptying near Haupersweiler into the Oster. This puts Selchenbach within the Saar-Blies drainage basin, with the mountains east of the village marking the watershed between this and the Glan-Nahe drainage basin on the other side. The heights on either side of the valley rise to more than 400 m above sea level; the greatest elevation is the Eichelberg at 465 m above sea level. A major contiguous forested area stretches to the village's north (the Schachenwald). The municipal area measures 479 ha, of which 100 ha is wooded.

=== Neighbouring municipalities ===
Selchenbach borders in the northeast on the municipality of Albessen, in the southeast on the municipality of Langenbach, in the south and west on the town of Sankt Wendel and in the northwest on the municipality of Herchweiler. Selchenbach also meets the municipality of Konken at a single point in the northeast.

=== Constituent communities ===
Selchenbach's Ortsteile are Oberselchenbach and Unterselchenbach.

=== Municipality’s layout ===
Selchenbach, which is made up of two centres called Oberselchenbach and Unterselchenbach, stretches for some one thousand metres mainly on the Selchenbach's left bank and on both sides of Bundesstraße 420, which is held to be the village's main street. A new building zone was opened up in the 1990s on Birkenweg. From the main street, several short sidestreets branch off. From south to north, these are Alte Hohl, Im Eck and Birkenweg (branching from each other after a short distance), Osterbrücker Weg and, somewhat longer, Siedlungsweg with the village community centre, the graveyard and the chapel. The pattern is broken somewhat in Unterselchenbach, where the old village street, Alte Straße (literally “Old Street”), owing to improvements made in 1938, was replaced with a bypass (today part of Bundesstraße 420). Here, the Selchenbach bows to the northwest, thus ending up on the other side of the street. Other streets in Unterselchenbach are Gartenstraße and Mühlweg. Despite the latter's name, literally “Mill Way”, it has been a long time since any mill stood in this area.

== History ==
=== Antiquity ===
Archaeological finds in the Selchenbach area go back to the Stone Age, among them two stone axes. One of these was found by a farmer while he was ploughing on the Wöllmesberg. It was some 10 cm long, and it is now in private ownership. The other was discovered while a wall was being torn down. The exact spot of this discovery, the piece's appearance and its whereabouts are now no longer known. As well, several barrows from the Bronze Age and the Iron Age are to be found within Selchenbach's limits, such as the ones on the burying ground north of the village near Bundesstraße 420, which also stretches into Herchweiler's and Langenbach's municipal areas. There are three other barrows on the Eichelberg's west slope. Many isolated finds have been made near various barrows, whose whereabouts are now mostly unknown. There is also a Roman road running from the Krottelbacher Loch towards Herchweiler.

=== Middle Ages ===
Even though Selchenbach was grouped into the so-called Remigiusland in a 14th-century Grenzscheidweistum (“border Weistum”, a Weistum – cognate with English wisdom – being a legal pronouncement issued by men learned in law in the Middle Ages and early modern times), this did not mean that the village had lain within the Remigiusland since its founding. The Counts of Veldenz, beginning in the 13th century, counted some areas as parts of the Remigiusland that had not before been owned by the Archbishopric of Reims, but rather by the Archbishopric of Mainz. Among the Mainz holdings were Ohmbach, some places around Niederkirchen and, quite likely, Selchenbach, too. The two archbishoprics’ holdings belonged originally to the Imperial Domain (Reichsland) around the Royal Castle Lautern. The village of Selchenbach is known with certainty only to have arisen a few hundred years after a Frankish king donated the lands to the Archbishoprics of Reims and Mainz. In 1127, Count Gerlach I from the Nahegau founded the County of Veldenz and became at the same time the Schutzvogt over the ecclesiastical properties in question. In 1262, Selchenbach had a documentary mention, according to which a priest gave the Wörschweiler Monastery some landholds, among them a garden at Selchenbach. At this time, the older line of the Counts of Veldenz were drawing towards their last days. Count Gerlach V was a member of a German delegation that offered King Alfonso X of Castile the German crown during the Great Interregnum, and he died shortly after returning from this mission to his county. Not long before Gerlach's death, his daughter Agnes had been born, and her grandfather, Count Heinrich of Zweibrücken, assumed the regency for her. Count Gerlach V had bequeathed most of his landholds to the Wörschweiler Monastery, which held consequences for Selchenbach, since land in the area around the village had now likewise passed to the monastery. As the Middle Ages went on, the placename Selchenbach cropped up mainly in taxation rolls (mostly the Wörschweiler Monastery's), in Weistümer and also in enfeoffment documents, as for example in one from 1430, according to which Syfrit Bliek von Lichtenberg bestowed upon his wife Katerine von Sötern, among other things from his feudal holdings, “13 Hahnen of the forests at Selchenbach”. This mention makes clear that Selchenbach was then in heavily wooded country. Already by the late 13th century, the family Blick von Lichtenberg had taken over the Vogtei over the Wörschweiler Monastery's ecclesiastical holdings within the County of Veldenz. In the Late Middle Ages, the abbots at the Wörschweiler Monastery and the monastery's Vögte established a Schöffengericht, a court at which Schöffen (roughly “lay jurists”) presided. Freeholders’ rights and duties with regard to the monastery and the Vögte were laid out in a series of Weistümer in 1451, 1458, 1501, 1528 and 1539. In 1444, the County of Veldenz met its end when Count Friedrich III of Veldenz died without a male heir. His daughter Anna wed King Ruprecht's son Count Palatine Stephan. By uniting his own Palatine holdings with the now otherwise heirless County of Veldenz – his wife had inherited the county, but not her father's title – and by redeeming the hitherto pledged County of Zweibrücken, Stephan founded a new County Palatine, as whose comital residence he chose the town of Zweibrücken: the County Palatine – later Duchy – of Palatinate-Zweibrücken.

=== Modern times ===
The village shared a history with the County Palatine of Zweibrücken until that state came to an end with the French Revolution. The Wörschweiler Monastery was dissolved in the Reformation and its whole estate was taken over by the Duchy of Palatinate-Zweibrücken, which then had it administered by a church guardianship. Even as far back as the 15th century, the so-called “Kingdom” posed a problem for Selchenbach and a series of neighbouring villages. The name (Königreich in German) went back to the free Imperial Domain around Kaiserslautern, out of which the Remigiusland had been carved. It was a great swath of land stretching from Marth to Bubach, taking in part of Selchenbach's municipal area, too. In 1451, this tract was held by the Lichtenberg Amtmann Thomas von Contwig, who sold it to the Counts of Nassau-Saarbrücken, who for their part exercised sovereign rights here, which in the time that followed led to disputes between Nassau-Saarbrücken and Zweibrücken. In various Weistümer that were set forth during these disagreements, inhabitants of Selchenbach were mentioned. Only in 1603 were the disputes settled by the State Treaty (Exchange) of Limbach. When the counts palatine (dukes) had the Königreicher Hof (“Kingdom Estate”) built in 1762, they called in all the “Kingdom’s” pledged landholds and then set the Estate up as a hereditary pledged landhold. In the 1588 description of the Oberamt of Lichtenberg by geographer Johannes Hoffmann, the village of Selchenbach, too, is named, specifically in a description of the course of the local brook, although Hoffmann called this “Die große Herchweiler Bach” (große means “great”), and not the Selchenbach as it is known today. Oberselchenbach and Unterselchenbach belonged to different parishes, the former to Niederkirchen and the latter to Konken. During the Thirty Years' War (1618-1648), the village was destroyed; only a few inhabitants survived the war. In 1609, Selchenbach had had as many as 62 inhabitants, but the population after the war only once again reached as high as 30 in 1675. More destruction was wrought in King Louis XIV's wars of conquest, whereafter Selchenbach was described as verbrannt (“burnt down”).

==== Recent times ====
At the time of the French annexation of the Rhine’s left bank in Napoleonic times, Selchenbach belonged to the Department of Sarre, the Arrondissement of Birkenfeld, the Canton of Kusel and the Mairie (“Mayoralty”) of Konken. After Napoleon was driven out, Selchenbach remained at first in the Birkenfeld district, but in 1816 it passed to the Kingdom of Bavaria, within which it was grouped into the Bürgermeisterei (“Mayoralty”) of Niederkirchen in 1818. During Bavarian times, Selchenbach, along with six other places in the Oster valley, belonged to the Landcommissariat and Canton of Kusel in this mayoralty. Selchenbach was itself the seat of a mayoralty from 1834 to 1848. In the late 1920s and early 1930s, the Nazi Party (NSDAP) became quite popular in Selchenbach. In the 1928 Reichstag elections, 0.7% of the local votes went to Adolf Hitler’s party, but by the 1930 Reichstag elections, this had grown to 24.4%. By the time of the 1933 Reichstag elections, after Hitler had already seized power, local support for the Nazis had swollen to 63.9%. Hitler's success in these elections paved the way for his Enabling Act of 1933 (Ermächtigungsgesetz), thus starting the Third Reich in earnest. The old territorial arrangement lasted until 1947, when several municipalities in the Oster valley were annexed to the Saar protectorate and an area of 297 ha was thereby split away from Selchenbach's municipal area and merged with Marth. Selchenbach, however, remained in the Kusel district. The Königreicher Hof, which hitherto had lain within Selchenbach's limits, was likewise separated from it and grouped into the Saarland. In the course of administrative restructuring in Rhineland-Palatinate in 1969, Selchenbach became a self-administering municipality within the Kusel district and was grouped into the newly formed Verbandsgemeinde of Kusel.

=== Population development ===
A sharp rise in Selchenbach's population occurred in the earlier half of the 19th century, levelling off by the middle of the century. This latter phenomenon owes itself mainly to the wave of emigration to North America. This was followed by a steady rise towards the end of the 19th century, although this in turn was followed by a fall in population due mainly to migration to industrial centres in the nearby Saarland. The early 20th century brought yet another rise in population, and then a fall due to the First World War, with further falls in the late 1920s and, of course, in the Second World War. Nowadays, too, a fall in population is taking place, this one due mainly to falling birth rates. More than 90% of Selchenbach's inhabitants are Protestant.

The following table shows population development over the centuries for Selchenbach, with some population counts giving a breakdown by religious affiliation:

Year	1609	1825	1836	1871	1905	1939	1961	2003	2005	2007
Total	62	290	313	329	393	439	403	395	391	371
Evangelical	62	279					389
Catholic	–	11					13

=== Municipality’s name ===
The placename ending —bach is combined in the municipality's name with the element Salicho, possibly meaning that a Frankish settler by this name founded a settlement here. The current form of the name appears in a 1588 copy of a document from as long ago as 1262. Other forms that the name has taken over time are as follows: Sequebqac (1266), Selkinbach (1487), Seigenbach (1727).

=== Vanished villages ===
A village named Neuhausen once lay south of Selchenbach. It was mentioned in 1381 as Neushusen and might have disappeared sometime about the end of the 15th century and the beginning of the 16th. The name Neuhausen still can still be seen in names given some rural cadastral areas.

== Religion ==
Selchenbach lay in the Remigiusland, thereby putting it under the authority of the Bishopric of Reims; parts were later owned by the Wörschweiler Monastery. Oberselchenbach, which belonged to the parish of Niederkirchen, had its own, small church, but this was destroyed in the Thirty Years' War, and was never built again. By the traditional rule of cuius regio, eius religio, all the inhabitants had to convert in the days of the Reformation according to their ducal rulers’ demands first to Lutheranism, and then later, in 1588, on Count Palatine Johannes I's orders, to Calvinism. At the turn of the 17th century, Unterselchenbach belonged to the church of Konken, as reflected in its belonging to the lordly domain of the Remigiusberg Monastery. After the Thirty Years' War, religious freedom was theoretically in force, although in practice the great majority of the population remained Protestant (Calvinist or Evangelical). In 1821, Unterselchenbach was transferred to the parish of Niederkirchen, but this arrangement was reverted only two years later. Oberselchenbach was transferred out of the parish of Niederkirchen in 1966 and into the parish of Konken. The village's few Catholics belong to the parish of Kusel.

== Politics ==
=== Municipal council ===
The council is made up of 8 council members, who were elected by majority vote at the municipal election held on 7 June 2009, and the honorary mayor as chairman.

=== Mayor ===
Selchenbach's mayor is Dieter Edinger.

=== Coat of arms ===
The German blazon reads: Über einem durch einen silbernen Wellenbalken abgeteilten, grünen Schildfluß in Blau ein schreitendes, silbernes Roß.

The municipality's arms might in English heraldic language be described thus: Azure a horse passant argent on a fess abased wavy of the same below which a base vert.

The horse charge in the arms goes back to a customary coat of arms that showed a gold horse on a green field, which itself went back to an old seal borne by the Schultheiß. The arms were approved by the now defunct Regierungsbezirk administration in Neustadt an der Weinstraße in 1983.

== Culture and sightseeing ==
=== Monuments ===
Standing at Selchenbach's graveyard, which was laid out in 1843 and has been expanded considerably since, is a mortuary, built in 1970, whose tower houses the village bell. This is rung twice daily, at 11 o’clock in the morning, and also at nightfall. It further tolls upon a villager's death. The warriors’ memorial, likewise at the graveyard, is framed by “graves of honour” with red gravestones. Veterans of either world war could (and still can) have themselves buried in this section.

=== Regular events ===
Selchenbach holds its kermis (church consecration festival, locally known as the Kerwe) on the second weekend in September. At this festival, the village youth decorate a “bouquet” (actually a tree), hold a “bouquet speech” in which the year's events are summarized and then dance the Drei Erschde. Formerly, guild balls were held at Shrovetide (Fastnacht), but this has now been reduced to a children's masquerade ball. At Easter, children hunt for eggs. Older boys and girls going to Confirmation receive from their godparents three white eggs and three colourful ones. On May Day Eve, a tree is decorated. The custom of young men affixing to their beloved a May twig or a bouquet has over the years been lost. The “witches”, though, have kept on making trouble. The custom of the Pfingstquack, too, is still alive (see the Henschtal for more about this). Over the last few years, the custom of Halloween from North America has been making itself felt. On New Year's Eve, the New Year is greeted with firecrackers and rockets. Selchenbach has held its village festival since 1984 on the first weekend in August.

=== Clubs ===
The first club that was founded in Selchenbach was the workers’ club in 1893. According to its charter, its goal was to promote comradeship and the love of the Fatherland for the Kaiser and the Prince Regent through social gatherings, and beyond that, the club was to help any member who found himself in need. This club lasted until 1945. Beginning in 1910, there was a cycling club called “Viktoria” and as of 1920 or 1921, there was a music club. Both ceased activities during the 1930s. After the Second World War, the first new club to arise was the singing club “Liederkranz”, which in 1958 was joined by another singing club called “Harmonie”. Once frictions between the two clubs had built up, they were both dissolved in 1967-1968. Replacing them was a mixed choir, which existed until 1991. Currently, Selchenbach has a countrywomen's club (since 1959), a women's nine-pin bowling club called “Die Harmlosen” (“The Harmless Ones”), a leisure club (since 1979) and a fire brigade promotional association (since 2000). The Oster valley local history and culture club also has members from Selchenbach.

=== Sport and leisure ===
For recreation and leisure, Selchenbach offers good hiking opportunities with circuit paths in the forest and fields, complete with benches for resting. Also appreciated is the shelter “Am Brückerbusch” where grilling can be done. Among public facilities, Selchenbach has a village community centre, which is available for cultural and sporting events.

== Economy and infrastructure ==
=== Economic structure ===
Agriculture was the original mainstay of the villagers’ livelihood. With the rise of industry beginning in the 19th century, though, ever more people sought work in it, mainly in the neighbouring Saarland. There were also once mills in the area surrounding the village. One was mentioned as early as the 16th century. In the latter half of that century, a man named Hans Morgen lived in Selchenbach, who ran a mill at the ponds near what later became the Königreicher Hof, and two others in Osterbrücken. About 1600, he built a fourth mill between Oberselchenbach and Unterselchenbach. This mill, right in Selchenbach, was destroyed in the Thirty Years' War, but was built once more after the war, and served on into the 19th century as an oilmill. A further mill stood upstream between Selchenbach and Herchweiler. In the 19th century, Selchenbach was also a mining village. The fields of the Ostergrube and the Grube Leimgraben (mines) reached partly into Selchenbach's municipal area. Coal mining lasted four decades all together at the Karstrech and Ober der Säuwiese (or Off de Hall). Since the coal was of low quality, the mining, which was difficult anyway, was shut down in 1874. Today, Selchenbach is purely a residential community for those who work at a great variety of occupations, most of whom need to commute to and from work. For some years now, because of people's greater mobility, there has been no grocery shop in Selchenbach, and the inns once found in the village have closed. Local people do their shopping in nearby towns such as Kusel, Sankt Wendel and Kaiserslautern.

=== Education ===
After schooling had begun in the local villages in the time of the Reformation, schoolchildren from Oberselchenbach were at first taught in Niederkirchen. In 1725, Oberselchenbach and Unterselchenbach together built their own schoolhouse. When after a century of use this building was no longer up to the task at hand, a new schoolhouse was built, which still stands on Hauptstraße today, although it is now under private ownership. From 1814 to 1854, teaching was imparted by Abraham Heyd, a former soldier in the Napoleonic French army. The school building was converted in 1934, and in 1963-1964, the village got yet another new schoolhouse. In the course of structural reforms, the school was closed in 1971, and the still newish school building was converted into a village community centre in 1985. Today, primary school pupils attend school in Konken, while Hauptschule students go to the Roßberg in Kusel. The district seat is also the location of higher schools, the vocational school and the designated special schools.

=== Transport ===
The village lies right on Bundesstraße 420, which leads from Ottweiler towards Mainz. To the northeast runs the Autobahn A 62 (Kaiserslautern–Trier). The interchange lies 5 km away. The nearest railway stations are Kusel station, terminus of the Landstuhl–Kusel railway served by Regionalbahn service RB 67 (called the Glantalbahn after the old Glan Valley Railway, which shared some of the route), and Sankt Wendel station, which has connections to Mainz, Frankfurt and Saarbrücken.
