= Kusel (district) =

Coordinates: 49°35′N 7°30′E

- District
- Flag Coat of arms
- Country: Germany
- State: Rhineland-Palatinate
- Capital: Kusel

Government
  - District admin.: Otto Rubly (CDU)

Area
  - Total: 573.42 km^{2} (221.40 sq mi)

Population (31 December 2023)
  - Total: 71,140
  - Density: 124.1/km^{2} (321.3/sq mi)
- Time zone: UTC+01:00 (CET)
  - Summer (DST): UTC+02:00 (CEST)
- Vehicle registration: KUS
- Website: landkreis-kusel.de

Kusel (German pronunciation: [ˈkuːzl̩]) is a district (Kreis) in the south of Rhineland-Palatinate, Germany. Neighboring districts are (from north-west clockwise) Birkenfeld, Bad Kreuznach, Donnersbergkreis, Kaiserslautern, Saarpfalz and Sankt Wendel (the last two belonging to the state of Saarland).

== History ==
The district of Kusel was created at the beginning of the 19th century. In 1939, it was renamed as Landkreis Kusel. The boundary was altered slightly as part of the communal reform of 1969/72 with some parts of the district of Birkenfeld being added to Kusel.

== Geography ==
The district of Kusel lies in the North Palatine Uplands (Nordpfälzer Bergland), to the north of the industrial areas of the Saarland. The largest rivers are the Lauter and the Glan.

== Politics ==
=== District Council ===
The District Council of Kusel consists of 38 council members elected once every 5 years via proportional representation.

The District Council election of 9 September 2024 yielded the following results:

Party	Votes	%	Seats
Christian Democratic Union (CDU)	9,159	24.5	10
Social Democratic Party (SPD)	8,122	21.8	8
Alternative for Germany (AfD)	6,930	18.6	3
Voters Group Danneck (WGD)	4,864	13.0	5
Free Voters (FWG)	4,727	12.7	5
Alliance 90/The Greens (Grüne)	2,111	5.7	2
Free Democratic Party (FDP)	1,410	3.8	1
Valid votes	37,323	97.1	
Invalid votes	1,121	2.9	
Total	38,444	100.0	38
Electorate/voter turnout	56,111	68.5	

== Coat of arms ==
The German blazon reads: Gespalten: Vorne in Schwarz ein linksgewendeter, rot bewehrter goldener Löwe, hinten in Silber ein rot bewehrter, blauer Löwe.

The district's arms might in English heraldic language be described thus: Per pale sable a lion rampant sinister Or armed and langued gules and argent a lion rampant azure armed and langued of the third.

The two charges, both lions, are both heraldic devices borne by former lords, the one on the dexter (armsbearer's right, viewer's left) side by the Counts of Veldenz and the one on the sinister (armsbearer's left, viewer's right) side by Electoral Palatinate, which acquired the area in the 15th century. The arms were approved on 13 December 1965.

== Towns and municipalities ==
Verbandsgemeinden
1. Kusel-Altenglan; 1. Albessen; 2. Altenglan; 3. Bedesbach; 4. Blaubach; 5. Bosenbach; 6. Dennweiler-Frohnbach; 7. Ehweiler; 8. Elzweiler; 9. Erdesbach; 10. Etschberg; 11. Föckelberg; 12. Haschbach am Remigiusberg; 13. Herchweiler; 14. Horschbach; 15. Körborn; 16. Konken; 17. Kusel^{1, 2}; 18. Neunkirchen am Potzberg; 19. Niederalben; 20. Niederstaufenbach; 21. Oberalben; 22. Oberstaufenbach; 23. Pfeffelbach; 24. Rammelsbach; 25. Rathsweiler; 26. Reichweiler; 27. Ruthweiler; 28. Rutsweiler am Glan; 29. Schellweiler; 30. Selchenbach; 31. Thallichtenberg; 32. Theisbergstegen; 33. Ulmet; 34. Welchweiler	2. Lauterecken-Wolfstein; 1. Adenbach; 2. Aschbach; 3. Buborn; 4. Cronenberg; 5. Deimberg; 6. Einöllen; 7. Eßweiler; 8. Ginsweiler; 9. Glanbrücken; 10. Grumbach; 11. Hausweiler; 12. Hefersweiler; 13. Heinzenhausen; 14. Herren-Sulzbach; 15. Hinzweiler; 16. Hohenöllen; 17. Homberg; 18. Hoppstädten; 19. Jettenbach; 20. Kappeln; 21. Kirrweiler; 22. Kreimbach-Kaulbach; 23. Langweiler; 24. Lauterecken^{1, 2}; 25. Lohnweiler; 26. Medard; 27. Merzweiler; 28. Nerzweiler; 29. Nußbach; 30. Oberweiler im Tal; 31. Oberweiler-Tiefenbach; 32. Odenbach; 33. Offenbach-Hundheim; 34. Reipoltskirchen; 35. Relsberg; 36. Rothselberg; 37. Rutsweiler an der Lauter; 38. Sankt Julian; 39. Unterjeckenbach; 40. Wiesweiler; 41. Wolfstein^{2}	3. Oberes Glantal; 1. Altenkirchen; 2. Börsborn; 3. Breitenbach; 4. Brücken; 5. Dittweiler; 6. Dunzweiler; 7. Frohnhofen; 8. Glan-Münchweiler; 9. Gries; 10. Henschtal; 11. Herschweiler-Pettersheim; 12. Hüffler; 13. Krottelbach; 14. Langenbach; 15. Matzenbach; 16. Nanzdietschweiler; 17. Ohmbach; 18. Quirnbach; 19. Rehweiler; 20. Schönenberg-Kübelberg^{1}; 21. Steinbach am Glan; 22. Wahnwegen; 23. Waldmohr
^{1}seat of the Verbandsgemeinde; ^{2}town
