= Pfeffelbach =

- Municipality
- Coat of arms

- Location of Pfeffelbach within Kusel district
- Interactive map of Pfeffelbach
- Location within Germany Location within Rhineland-Palatinate
- Coordinates: 49°32′20.6″N 7°19′40.10″E
- Country: Germany
- State: Rhineland-Palatinate
- District: Kusel
- Municipal assoc.: Kusel-Altenglan

Government
  - Mayor (2019–24): Hans Blinn

Area
  - Total: 11.28 km^{2} (4.36 sq mi)
- Elevation: 310 m (1,020 ft)

Population (2025-12-31)
  - Total: 881
  - Density: 78.1/km^{2} (202/sq mi)
- Time zone: UTC+01:00 (CET)
  - Summer (DST): UTC+02:00 (CEST)
- Postal codes: 66871
- Dialling codes: 06384
- Vehicle registration: KUS
- Website: www.pfeffelbach.de

Pfeffelbach is an Ortsgemeinde – a municipality belonging to a Verbandsgemeinde, a kind of collective municipality – in the Kusel district in Rhineland-Palatinate, Germany. It belongs to the Verbandsgemeinde of Kusel-Altenglan, whose seat is in Kusel.

== Geography ==
=== Location ===
Pfeffelbach lies in the heart of the Westrich, an historic region that encompasses areas in both Germany and France, at the edge of the Preußische Berge ("Prussian Mountains") in the Western Palatinate. Among these mountains, one within Pfeffelbach's limits, the Herzerberg, is the district's highest peak at 585 m above sea level. On this mountain are both a lookout platform, from which visitors can see as far as Kaiserslautern on a clear day, and a launch point for hang gliders. The municipality lies in the broad valley of the Pfeffelbach, which rises only a few kilometres to the west. The brook flows northeastwards to the steep slopes of Castle Lichtenberg. The village spreads out mainly over the brook's right bank as an extensive clump village. On the valley's north side, the Preußische Berge rise up to heights of almost 600 m above sea level in a long ridge (Teufelskopf 582 m, Spitzerberg 577 m, Herzerberg 585 m). Rising up over this mountain chain is a tall broadcast tower, which actually stands within Eckersweiler's limits. The heights south of the village reach above 400 m above sea level (Niederberg 442 m, Pflugsturz 416 m). Cutting through the municipal area in the southwest is the Autobahn A 62 (Kaiserslautern–Trier). Particularly in the south and east, hard-stone quarries can be found, some of which are still being worked. The municipal area measures 1 132 ha, of which 600 ha is wooded.

=== The Pfeffelbach ===
The brook that flows through Pfeffelbach is the village's namesake (Bach means "brook" in German). It rises just below Schwarzerden, a constituent community of Freisen in the Saarland, and after flowing for just under 6 km, it empties into the Kuselbach in Kusel's outlying centre of Diedelkopf.

=== Neighbouring municipalities ===
Pfeffelbach borders in the north on the municipality of Berschweiler bei Baumholder, in the northeast on the municipality of Thallichtenberg, in the east on the municipality of Ruthweiler, in the southeast on the town of Kusel and the municipality of Ehweiler, in the south on the municipality of Albessen, in the southwest on the municipality of Freisen (outlying centre of Schwarzerden, Saarland), in the west on the municipality of Reichweiler and in the northwest on the municipality of Eckersweiler (Birkenfeld district).

=== Municipality's layout ===
The streets in Pfeffelbach's old built-up area run in an almost star-shaped pattern towards the church, whose location may well be considered the village's point of origin. Running thence, northwards, is the street Bangertseck, which then turns northwestwards. Running eastwards and northeastwards is Kirchstraße ("Church Street"), while Brunnenstraße ("Well Street") and Obereck ("Upper Corner") run to the west. Running somewhat apart from these other streets, parallel to the Pfeffelbach, is the through road, Landesstraße 349, which is partly built up towards the west on the stretch known here as St. Wendeler Straße and that to the east here called Kuseler Straße. The split between these two named stretches of the road occurs one block from a bridge across the Pfeffelbach. Branching off the highway to the south here is Hauptstraße ("Main Street"), which then crosses the brook and turns eastwards to run through the edge of the more heavily built-up area. The trackbed of the former railway (now a cycleway and footpath) runs along the south of the village site, while the former railway station stands in the village's southeast end. Halfway between the church and the old railway lies the sporting ground. Standing here, too, is what was once the school's gymnasium, but is now a multipurpose hall. In the newer neighbourhood to the northeast lies the graveyard. The building work in the 19th and 20th centuries mainly took place on the through road and Hauptstraße. The former schoolhouse stands slantwise across the street from the church. Three former mills stand on the brook, the Schwarzenborner Mühle upstream from the village, and farther downstream the Altmühle and the Bremmenmühle. Noteworthy new building zones have sprung up near the old railway station (Binnerwies-Pfarracker) and north of the highway.

== History ==
=== Antiquity ===
The oldest traces of the past in Pfeffelbach go back to Roman times, namely a piece of an old gravestone used as spolia in the churchtower showing the upper parts of a man's and a woman's bodies with the inscription "D M" (Dis Manibus – "to the Di Manes"). Besides this, there were reports of Roman archaeological finds as far back as the 16th century. In 1967, on the Anieshügel (a hill), Karlheinz Schultheiß unearthed many potsherds, some of them from the 2nd or 3rd century AD, and bits of tile.

=== Middle Ages ===
Pfeffelbach may have been founded in the so-called Remigiusland, which, it is highly likely, was donated towards the end of the 6th century to the then Bishopric of Reims by the Merovingian Frankish King Childebert II. On 19 November 1124, Archbishop Adelbert I of Mainz acknowledged for Abbot Odo of the Abbey of Saint-Remi in Reims the latter's ownership, within the Reims holdings around Kusel, of the Church of Kusel with its chapels of ease at Altenglan, Konken and Pfeffelbach. Shortly before this, Pfeffelbach's first documentary mention, the Remigiusland had been handed over to Count Gerlach I from the Nahegau as a Vogtei (1121), who took this and other Vogteien that he held from the Archbishopric of Mainz and the Bishopric of Reims, along with some of his own holdings, and founded the County of Veldenz. In 1138, a number of villages were mentioned as belonging to Kusel, among them Peffelenbach. The County of Veldenz was later divided into Ämter, which themselves comprised several Schultheißereien or Unterämter. Pfeffelbach became the seat of one such Schultheißerei in the Amt of Lichtenberg alongside the other Schultheißereien of Ulmet and Konken. In 1316, F. X. Glasschröder's Neue Urkunden zur pfälzischen Kirchengeschichte ("New Documents About Palatine Church History") mentioned the village as Peychnillenbach. In 1324, according to Thielmann von Konken, Wilhelm von Tholey became the priest at the church at Pfeffelbach. By 1329, however, Boemund von St. Wendel held the chaplaincy at Pfeffelbach. In 1385, the regesta of the Counts of Veldenz mentioned the Amt of Pfeffelbach and named the Amts-Schultheiß as "Berscheln". In 1444, the County of Veldenz met its end when Count Friedrich III of Veldenz died without a male heir. His daughter Anna wed King Ruprecht's son Count Palatine Stephan. By uniting his own Palatine holdings with the now otherwise heirless County of Veldenz – his wife had inherited the county, but not her father's title – and by redeeming the hitherto pledged County of Zweibrücken, Stephan founded a new County Palatine, as whose comital residence he chose the town of Zweibrücken: the County Palatine – later Duchy – of Palatinate-Zweibrücken. Pfeffelbach remained a seat within this state, now of an Unteramt, itself within the Oberamt of Lichtenberg, which had now been expanded into ten Schultheißereien, and whose capital was moved to Diedelkopf. In 1477, the regesta mentioned in the Lichtenberg accounts, under palace income, a small fulling mill, although its location is now unknown.

=== Modern times ===
At the time when history was moving from the Middle Ages to modern times, Pfeffelbach had 42 inhabitants who were liable to taxation, making it one of the bigger villages in the Amt of Lichtenberg. In 1516, Nickolaus Becker von Lichtenberg was mentioned; he was to be the last local priest before the Reformation. In 1523, the parish became Lutheran under Ludwig II, Duke of Zweibrücken (the Reformation had taken hold throughout the duchy by 1526). In 1533 came the first ecclesiastical visitation in the Oberamt of Lichtenberg, at which Pfeffelbach was represented by an Evangelical clergyman, as was every other parish in the Oberamt but Niederkirchen. In 1609, another Oberamt of Lichtenberg ecclesiastical visitation protocol yielded, among other things, the oldest known list of Pfeffelbach's inhabitants; there were 217. After the Plague had made itself felt in the village and the surrounding countryside in 1596 and 1597, 188 people died in the grim epidemic in Pfeffelbach and the neighbouring villages of Schwarzerden and Reichweiler in 1612 alone. To add to these woes, a fire broke out in Pfeffelbach the following year, destroying several houses including the rectory, barns and stables. Churchwarden Preuel wrote in a report dated 10 August 1613: "Last Friday, a great fire raged, in which the rectory, the barn, the stable and other buildings in the village were destroyed." In 1618, the Thirty Years' War broke out, bringing the village its share of great hardship and woe. A great part of the population was killed, and buildings were burnt down. Further death and destruction came along with French King Louis XIV’s wars of conquest. In 1626, Hans Schworm, the innkeeper, was running the mill at Reichweiler. In 1642, according to a report from the clergyman, Bösius, troops of the Duke of Lorraine had behaved most wickedly in Pfeffelbach, and the village saw no end to the misery. In 1675, in a directory by Textor under the heading Entfestigungen und Zerstörungen im Rheingebiet während des 17. Jahrhunderts ("Decay and Destruction in the Rhine Area During the 17th Century"), Pfeffelbach appears among the villages burnt down by Louis XIV's armies. That same year, only 13 families still lived in Pfeffelbach; by 1688, this had risen to 22. Eighty years later, in 1768, Pfeffelbach had 375 inhabitants. The 18th century then brought the village a time of general upswing and growth.

==== Recent times ====
In 1792, French Revolutionary troops marched in. In 1795, cantonal official Benzino closed the church books in Pfeffelbach; that is to say, he forbade the church to keep any more records of baptisms, weddings and deaths, reasoning that this was the civil registry office's job. This office was located at Lichtenberg Castle. The newly instituted Bürgermeisterei ("Mayoralty") of Burg Lichtenberg, however, only began keeping such records in 1819. Consequently, no such records are available from the period between 1795 and 1819. Owing to the annexation by France after the French Revolution and during the Napoleonic Era that followed, Pfeffelbach lost its status as an Amt seat. In the course of territorial reorganization, Pfeffelbach was grouped into the Department of Sarre, the Arrondissement of Birkenfeld, the Canton of Kusel and the Mairie ("Mayoralty") of Burglichtenberg. On Easter Monday 1802, there was another great fire in Pfeffelbach. This one all but destroyed the village. Almost every house, along with the church and the rectory, was burnt down. Owing to the hard times – it was still the Napoleonic Era – not every house could be restored. After Napoleon's final defeat, the Congress of Vienna wrought yet another territorial reorganization. In 1816, Pfeffelbach passed to the Principality of Lichtenberg. Put together from part of the former Oberamt of Lichtenberg, parts of the former Electorate of Trier and the Waldgraviate-Rhinegraviate, this was a newly created exclave of the Duchy of Saxe-Coburg-Saalfeld, which as of 1826 became the Duchy of Saxe-Coburg and Gotha. Its seat was Sankt Wendel, and it was subdivided into the Cantons of Sankt Wendel, Baumholder (in which Pfeffelbach lay) and Grumbach. Pfeffelbach lay in the Amt of Burglichtenberg. As part of this state, Pfeffelbach passed in 1834 by sale – the price was 2,100,000 Thalers – to the Kingdom of Prussia, which made this area into the Sankt Wendel district in the Rhine Province. More locally, Pfeffelbach lay within the Bürgermeisterei ("Mayoralty") and later Amt of Burglichtenberg. Later, after the First World War, the Treaty of Versailles stipulated, among other things, that 26 of the Sankt Wendel district's 94 municipalities had to be ceded to the British- and French-occupied Saar in 1919. The remaining 68 municipalities then bore the designation "Restkreis St. Wendel-Baumholder", with the first syllable of Restkreis having the same meaning as in English, in the sense of "left over". The district seat was at Baumholder.

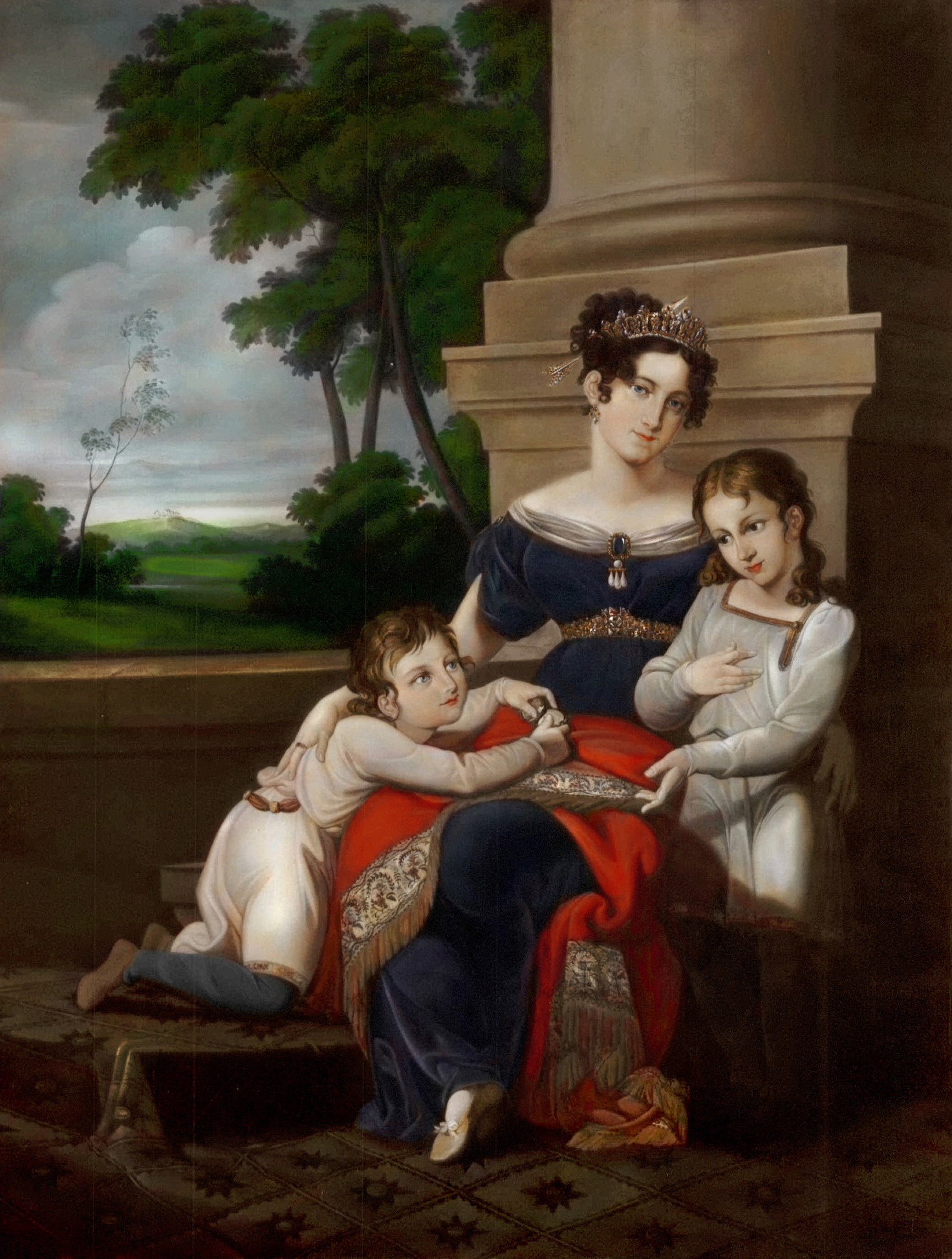
Duchess Luise of Saxe-Coburg and Gotha, whose body was "translated" several times; the boy on the left is Prince Albert.

In the summer of 1833, Pfeffelbach's church was the scene of the late Duchess Luise's translation and burial (she had already been dead for two years by this time). The Duchess's embalmed body had at first been kept at the Schlösschen ("little palace") at Sankt Wendel, but then, as a result of sinister intrigues within the House of Saxe-Cobourg, somehow went astray. First, the coffin found its way to a legal assistant's house, and then in 1833 to the church in Pfeffelbach, where it lay in a simple crypt under the pulpit and was later almost forgotten. On 9 June 1846, the late Duchess's coffin was raised and there followed another translation, this time to Coburg, where it at first lay at the town church, before being moved to the mausoleum on the Glockenberg in 1860. One of Duchess Luise's sons was Prince Albert, Queen Victoria's consort.

Pfeffelbach belonged to the Restkreis until 1937, when it was transferred to the Birkenfeld district. This was created by uniting the Restkreis with a hitherto Oldenburg district of that same name. The new, bigger district was grouped into the Prussian Regierungsbezirk of Koblenz. After the Second World War, the village at first lay in the Regierungsbezirk of Koblenz in the then newly founded state of Rhineland-Palatinate. In the course of administrative restructuring in this state in 1969, the Amt of Burglichtenberg was dissolved. Pfeffelbach passed to the newly founded Verbandsgemeinde of Kusel-Altenglan and to the Kusel district, in which it remains today. It also found itself in the new Regierungsbezirk of Rheinhessen-Pfalz, although this has since been dissolved. According to an 1816 report, Pfeffelbach had 63 bungalows, 20 two-storey houses and 10 "wooden houses" (this likely meant timber-frame houses) with 474 inhabitants. Among the village's craftsmen were three millers, one shoemaker, two tailors, one bricklayer, one cabinetmaker, one smith and one knacker. Between 1841 and 1877, the geometer Efferz undertook a cadastral survey. One soldier from Pfeffelbach fell in the Franco-Prussian War in 1870. That same year, Peter Aulenbacher, Jakob Braun and Jakob Heß opened Pfeffelbach's first stone quarry. Paving stones from this quarry and others that were subsequently opened were shipped by horse and cart to Kusel and for a time even to Sankt Wendel. A threshing cooperative was founded in 1872, a threshing shed was built and a threshing machine was bought. In 1893, the church at Pfeffelbach acquired the organ that it still has now. On 10 May 1896, to commemorate the conclusion of a peace treaty with France that put an end to the Franco-Prussian War on 10 May 1871 – thus on the 25th anniversary of its signing – the veterans’ association, which had been established only the year before, planted the so-called Bismarckeiche ("Bismarck Oak"). It was a gift from Otto von Bismarck himself to the local veterans’ association and came from the Sachsenwald near Friedrichsruh. In 1900 there were for the first time miners and foundry workers in Pfeffelbach who were employed in the Saar area. In 1914, the First World War broke out. On 16 August 1917, a commercial survey was undertaken, which yielded the following data: two stone quarrying businesses, three innkeepers, four traders, two bakers, two cabinetmakers, two smiths, one turner, one plumber, two butter and milk dealers, two shoemakers, three gristmills, two butchers, one insurance agent, three wheelwrights, one sculptor, one tailor, one shaver, one house painter and two midwives. Those who were not self-employed worked in crafts, business, stone quarries, Saar mines, the ironworks in Neunkirchen am Potzberg and in a few cases even in the building trade. The greater part of the population, though, worked mainly in agriculture. The First World War also saw the local church lose its bell, which had to be given up for war requirements. In October 1918, the village was gripped by an influenza epidemic. Fully half the villagers became ill, and 21 of them died. On 11 November of that same year came the Armistice; 54 soldiers from Pfeffelbach had fallen in the Great War. A memorial to them was dedicated on 18 September 1921. The autumn of 1919 was very dry, so dry that the brooks all stopped running, forcing the miller to suspend the pursuit of his craft. The potato harvest was bad, but on the other hand, there was quite an ample fruit harvest. The dry autumn was followed by a very wet winter when on 17 January 1920, Pfeffelbach and the surrounding area were stricken with a formidable flood. In 1921, an electrical supply network was built in the village. The year 1931 marked the end of an era in Pfeffelbach when Adam Schäfer wove the very last homemade linen on his own loom at his own house. The cottage spinning and weaving industry had once been the norm, with spinning wheels, looms and other equipment for making textiles in every farmhouse. The 1930s saw a spate of railway building. The line from Kusel to Ottweiler opened in 1935. On 16 November of the following year, the whole line from Kusel to Türkismühle opened. The stretch of the Ostertalbahn between Schwarzerden and Ottweiler followed on 15 May 1938. The 1930s also saw the rise of the Third Reich after Adolf Hitler's seizure of power in Germany in 1933, and the outbreak of the Second World War. Upon Germany's defeat in 1945, Pfeffelbach found itself in the French zone of occupation. A memorial to the men from Pfeffelbach who had fallen or gone missing in the war was dedicated on 19 November 1961. Sadly, the war had not claimed its last victim by 1945. At about eight o’clock on the morning of the Harvest Festival in 1952, the village was shaken by an explosion. Two young men, Ewald Aulenbacher and Hans Wagen, who had been doing some digging work beside one of the houses, struck a buried Teller mine, which blew up, tearing both men to bits. In 1964, passenger rail service between Kusel and Schwarzerden came to an end, and beginning on 1 June 1967 the railway line closed entirely with the suspension of goods transport as well. On 20 September 1965, preparatory work began for Flurbereinigung. In 1968, the new water cistern was finished. In August 1991, in the course of the village renewal project, council decided upon an overhaul of the village centre. This included a new fountain complex, a bus waiting hall and parking. In 1992, the contract for this work was awarded to the firm Alpha-Bau, Kusel, for DM 282,000. A further DM 27,000 contract went to the Peters nursery for the plants. The fountain complex was dedicated on 4 December 1993. The flooding problem in Pfeffelbach's "Pfarracker" led in October 1995 to a planning contract being awarded to the engineering office of Schöer from Waldmohr. On 15 and 16 May 1999, the municipality of Pfeffelbach held its 875-year jubilee celebration. In May 2000, it was decided to renaturate the Oderbach. Also in 2000, plans for a new building zone, "Im Damm", were set forth. The contract for the work was awarded to the firm Adams from Halsenbach in August 2002. In December 2004, the municipality decided to establish a website and have an email address.

=== Population development ===
Pfeffelbach's inhabitants earned their livelihoods in earlier times mainly at agriculture. There were also the obligatory craftsmen in this comparatively big village. In the 19th century, there were already job opportunities at the stone quarries, especially for farmers’ younger sons. It was in this time that there was quite a strong trend towards emigration, especially to the United States. From the turn of the 20th century onwards, many men from Pfeffelbach worked at the coalmines in the Saarland. These Saargänger ("Saar-goers") often ran a small farm for their families’ own needs. According to a civil register from the late 19th century, there were some 200 farmers in the village, and alongside them, various people in the occupations listed below. Most of these traditional occupations are no longer to be found. Even farming has been reduced to an occupation of lesser importance now that vast swathes of farmland are worked by only a few operations. Bit by bit, the village underwent a shift from a farming village to a workers’ village, but even this must be qualified today. Even though a whole series of businesses have located in the village itself, there are villagers in the most varied of occupations, many of whom must commute to jobs elsewhere. From a religious standpoint, most inhabitants belong to the Evangelical faith. While there were 216 people living in the village in 1609 (in neighbouring Ruthweiler 86), the population, which suffered losses in the 17th century's many wars, rose until the early 19th century to almost 500 inhabitants. About the middle of the 19th century, the 1,000 mark was breached, and in 2000, the population peaked at 1,063 inhabitants at a time when population figures were generally seen to be shrinking.

The following table shows occupations outside farming in Pfeffelbach about 1900:

Occupation	Number
Bakers	2
Blacksmiths	4
Bricklayers	24
Butchers	1
Cabinetmakers	4
Carpenters	1
Clergymen	1
Day labourers	3
Gardeners	1
House painters	1
Herdsmen	1
Innkeepers	3
Merchants	3
Midwives	1
Plumbers	1
Retail dealers	2
Salesmen	1
Schoolteachers	2
Seamstresses	1
Shoemakers	5
Stone dressers	3
Tailors	3
Wainwrights	4

The following table shows population development over the centuries for Pfeffelbach:

Year	1609	1815	1843	1871	1905	1939	1961	1972	1978	2000	2005
Total	216	474	731	803	862	1,010	1,044	1,059	1,050	1,063	1,024

=== Municipality's name ===
If it is assumed that Pfeffelbach's name is put together from the word Bach (German for "brook") and an old German personal name, then Pfeffelbach must originally have been a settlement of a man named "Paffilo", and thus "Paffilo's Brook". In the 1124 first documentary mention, the village is called Peflembach. Among other names that the village has had are Peffellembach (1138), Peffebach (1305), Peffelnbach (1328), Pfeffelnbach (1347) and Pfeffelbach (1588). Even the name form Peychnillenbach (named in 1316) was counted by Ernst Christmann, whereas researchers Dolch and Greule reckon that this name belonged to a former village near Diedelkopf. There are other, unpublished attempts to interpret the village's name. The prefix might, for instance, have something to do with the word "Paffen" or "Pfaffen" (German for "clerics" or "parsons" – a usage now considered disparaging), which would point to the village's having arisen in the Early Middle Ages near a monastery.

=== Vanished villages ===
Within Pfeffelbach's current limits, two now vanished villages can be mentioned, Herzweiler and Stauderhof. Herzweiler lay near the municipal limit with Reichweiler and was likely forsaken as long ago as the 15th century, but references to it still crop up in rural cadastral toponyms, such as Herzerberg. The Stauderhof – the name took a definite article – was named in geometer Johannes Hoffmann's writings ("Der Stauderhof war damals eine Räuberhöhle, und die Bewohner schreckten auch vor Morden nicht zurück" – "The Stauderhof was then a den of robbers, and its dwellers did not shy away from murder, either."), but otherwise crops up nowhere else.

== Religion ==
Pfeffelbach was as early on as the Middle Ages already a parish hub. Bearing witness to this is the church building with its spolia from Roman times that was mentioned in the 1124 document, but which is nonetheless likely much older and might not be Pfeffelbach's very first church building. According to the 1124 document, Pfeffelbach was, along with Konken and Altenglan, one of three chapels of ease of the Church of Kusel, and was said to be held by the Abbey of Saint-Remi but belonged with regard to ecclesiastical organization to the Archbishopric of Mainz. After several conversions, only the churchtower was still preserved. Beyond that, little is known about the Church of Pfeffelbach in Middle Ages. In 1534, the Dukes of Zweibrücken introduced the Reformation. The last Catholic priest was Nikolaus Becker. The first Lutheran pastor was said to be Johannes Gelanus, while towards the end of the century, Pastor Heinrich Gossenberger was working in the village, but was generally held to be a drunkard, becoming so well known for this that tales are told about him in Pfeffelbach to this day. Beginning in 1588, Count Palatine Johannes I forced all his subjects to convert to Reformed belief as espoused by John Calvin. In the Saxe-Cobourg Principality of Lichtenberg and later on, in the Prussian Rhine Province, the Protestant church establishment in Pfeffelbach found its way into today's Evangelical Church in the Rhineland (a full member of the Evangelical Church in Germany). The Duke of Saxe-Cobourg decreed the merger of the two Protestant denominations in 1818, and the decision handed down by a synod in Baumholder in 1820 instituted the "complete union" of the two denominations, Lutheranism and Calvinism. The now united Evangelical Church of the Principality of Lichtenberg belonged in Prussian times after 1834 within the Rhenish Provincial Church to the church district of Sankt Wendel. Fundamentally, this organizational structure remains in place even today. The village's Roman Catholic Christians belong, in line with their historical development, to the deaconry of Kusel, and they also attend services in Kusel. During the 18th century, the church in Pfeffelbach could also be used simultaneously. In earlier times, a few Jews also lived in the village as the Dukes’ Schutzjuden.

== Politics ==
=== Municipal council ===
The council is made up of 16 council members, who were elected by proportional representation at the municipal election held on 7 June 2009, and the honorary mayor as chairman.

The municipal election held on 7 June 2009 yielded the following results:

	SPD	WGR	Total
2009	9	7	16 seats
2004	9	7	16 seats

"WGR" is a voters' group.

=== Mayor ===
Pfeffelbach's mayor is Hans Blinn.

=== Coat of arms ===
The German blazon reads: Von Silber und Silber geteilt, oben ein wachsender, rotbewehrter und -bezungter, blauer Löwe, unten ein bewurzelter, brauner Baum mit grünen Blättern.

The municipality's arms might in English heraldic language be described thus: Per fess argent a demilion azure armed and langued gules and argent a tree eradicated proper.

The charge on the upper field of the escutcheon, the demilion ("half" lion, cut off at the waist) is a reference to the village's former allegiance to the County of Veldenz. The charge on the lower field, the uprooted tree, is modelled on an old Schultheiß seal. The arms have been borne since 1962 when they were approved by the Rhineland-Palatinate Ministry of the Interior. A coat of arms with both fields of the same tincture is very rare.

== Culture and sightseeing ==
=== Buildings ===
The following are listed buildings or sites in Rhineland-Palatinate's Directory of Cultural Monuments:

- Evangelical parish church, Kirchenstraße 4 – west wall of the Romanesque tower in the aisleless church from 1806 to 1811, expansion 1862; keystone marked 1758 (spolia); Stumm organ from 1893; in the churchyard warriors’ memorial 1914–1918 and 1939–1945
- Brunnenstraße 2 – former school; instruction wing and teacher's house joined by stairway, marked 1902; characterizes village's appearance

=== Regular events ===
Twice each year in Pfeffelbach, an autocross race is held on the abandoned stone quarry lands. The kermis (church consecration festival, locally known as the Kerwe) is always held on the fourth Sunday in September.

=== Clubs ===
The following clubs are currently active in Pfeffelbach:

- Angelsportverein — angling club
- Automobilsportclub
- CDU-Ortsverein — Christian Democratic Union of Germany local chapter
- Evangelischer Kirchenchor — Evangelical church choir
- FCK-Fanclub — 1. FC Kaiserslautern fan club
- Förderverein der Grundschule — primary school promotional association
- Fröhliche Wanderer 1987 — hiking club
- Fußballclub 1920 — football club
- Jugendtreff — youth club
- Landfrauenverein — countrywomen's club
- Männergesangverein "Eintracht" — men's singing club
- Schützenverein — shooting club
- Skat-Club — skat club
- SPD-Ortsverein — Social Democratic Party of Germany local chapter
- Tischtennisverein — table tennis club
- VdK-Ortsgruppe — advocacy group (local chapter) for veterans, the handicapped and pensioners

== Economy and infrastructure ==
=== Economic structure ===
Pfeffelbach was originally a big farming village, though by and by, workers came to seek their livelihoods in other occupations, too, at first mainly as stone quarry workers, and then in the early 20th century also as so-called Saargänger ("Saar-goers") at the collieries in the nearby Saarland. The farming village first turned into a workers’ village. For centuries, the mills were traditional businesses. The Altmühle ("Old Mill") was in early feudal times held by the church and was said to be the church estate mill, meaning that all the parish's farmers had to have their grain ground here. A Mühlenweistum (a Weistum – cognate with English wisdom – was a legal pronouncement issued by men learned in law in the Middle Ages and early modern times; a Mühlenweistum is one that deals with mills) for this mill was first put together in 1585 and survives today in a 1762 copy. At the time of the French Revolution, the mill passed into state ownership and was then sold to a family named Jung, and has belonged to their descendants ever since, although the mill itself long ago ceased to function as such. The Eselsmühle ("Ass's Mill"), also called the Schwarzenborner Mühle, was a so-called Pletschmühle (one with an overshot waterwheel that could only run when the water flow was strong enough) that only ground grain for its successive owners’ needs, and only served others if the estate mill was overloaded. This mill, too, was mentioned even before the Thirty Years' War, and by 1632, it was owned by Heinrich Süß. A third mill downstream from the village in turn bore the names Neumühle ("New Mill"), Brunnenmühle, Bremmenmühle, and last, Faußmühle, according to its owners during the 19th century, and it, too, existed before the Thirty Years' War. Once also standing within Pfeffelbach's limits was a walking mill, although its exact site is now unknown. About the middle of the 19th century, the first hard-stone quarries were opened within Pfeffelbach's limits. The first major quarry was opened in 1870, while others followed in 1887 and 1904. Workers and, as a secondary occupation, also smallhold farmers could seek employment in the village itself. The operations were heavily bound to economic cycles. The quarries originally produced only paving stones, but later also crushed stone and ballast for road and railway building. Two quarries are still in business even now, but now employ few workers. Besides the quarries, there are small businesses, shops and inns in the village. All in all, Pfeffelbach is nowadays a residential community for people in the most varied of occupations, many of whom must commute elsewhere to their jobs.

=== Education ===
Beginning in the late 16th century, the Dukes of Zweibrücken sought to promote schooling in their country. At this time, it was most often the pastor who did the teaching. All the good intentions that went into these initiatives in the late 16th and early 17th centuries, however, were annihilated in the ravages of the Thirty Years' War. Only with great effort was a new system built up after the war. In Pfeffelbach, the pastor resigned from his extra duty as schoolmaster in 1651. Hired as schoolteacher then was Hans Simon Brill, who, given his income, would settle for nothing less than being freed of compulsory labour duty. He also owned the best cart in the village, and the municipality would rather have forgone his teaching than his compulsory labour. About this problem, school inspector Gervinus reported his opinion that a clergyman could perform better at teaching than an ordinary man, and that there would be no guarantee that comparable teaching could be expected from Brill. From this, a newly selected teacher should have been hired. Nevertheless, Brill still taught, even if he was not freed of compulsory labour duty. In 1661, Johann Berthel Fischer was hired, whom the parents reproached for making the young cleverer than their elders. Later on, there were also craftsmen and farmworkers who taught any willing children to read and write, at first only in the wintertime. Further schoolteachers are listed by name, although in general the records from the 18th century are mainly about the teacher's income. Fifty to sixty parish children attended lessons around 1600, from some 80 families living throughout the parish. By the late 18th century, this had grown to roughly one hundred children. In 1847, and thus already into Prussian times, Pfeffelbach got its own schoolhouse, after all kinds of provisory arrangements had served as schoolrooms. The municipality had this first schoolhouse torn down in 1902 and replaced with a new building, which was used as a school until 1955. Usually, school was divided into three classes. When this new schoolhouse soon became too small, school was to be taught in shifts, but the parents put up a fight against this proposal, and won after threatening a "school strike". Now, a fourth class was to be set up, and also, the 9th school year was to be introduced. Proposals to expand the school carried on at length, until in the end Mayor Edmund Müller, on his own initiative, had a pavilion built that solved the space problem, at least at first. In 1968, a sporting ground was laid out near the school with a 100-metre track, a gymnasium and a children's playground. As a result of constant reorganizations and efforts at centralization, there were time and again space problems, and frequent teacher turnover. Eventually, eleven classes were being taught at the Pfeffelbach school, but the changes were not over yet. Soon, the upper classes were all grouped into the Hauptschule Kusel, and now there was only the primary school left in Pfeffelbach. In Kusel, students can also attend vocational schools and other kinds of secondary school. There are also special schools for children with learning difficulties or mental handicaps. The nearest university town is Kaiserslautern (Kaiserslautern University of Technology). Pfeffelbach today has one kindergarten and one primary school.

=== Public institutions ===
Pfeffelbach has a multipurpose hall.

=== Transport ===
Pfeffelbach lies on Landesstraße 349, which leads from Thallichtenberg by way of Pfeffelbach to the state boundary with the Saarland. Running southwest of the village, but within municipal limits, is the Autobahn A 62 (Kaiserslautern–Trier), with an interchange some 3 km west of Pfeffelbach. A railway between Kusel and Türkismühle by way of Pfeffelbach (the Westrichbahn) was in service from 1936 to 1969. Its trackbed nowadays serves as a cycleway and footpath. Kusel station is on the Landstuhl–Kusel railway served by Regionalbahn service RB 67, which uses part of the Glantalbahn and runs through to Kaiserslautern.
