= Schönenberg-Kübelberg (Verbandsgemeinde) =

Coordinates: 49°24′38″N 7°22′36″E

Schönenberg-Kübelberg is a former Verbandsgemeinde ("collective municipality") in the district of Kusel, Rhineland-Palatinate, Germany. On 1 January 2017 it merged into the new Verbandsgemeinde Oberes Glantal. As of 1971 the seat of the Verbandsgemeinde was in Schönenberg-Kübelberg.

The Verbandsgemeinde Schönenberg-Kübelberg consisted of the following Ortsgemeinden ("local municipalities"):

1. Altenkirchen
2. Brücken
3. Dittweiler
4. Frohnhofen
5. Gries
6. Ohmbach
7. Schönenberg-Kübelberg
