= Ohmbach =

- Municipality
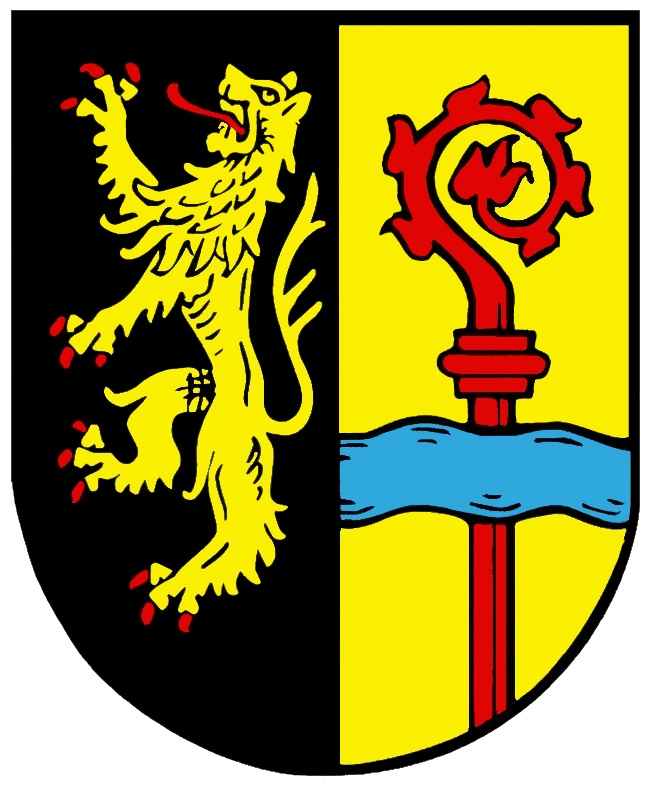
- Coat of arms

- Location of Ohmbach within Kusel district
- Interactive map of Ohmbach
- Location within Germany Location within Rhineland-Palatinate
- Coordinates: 49°26′58.3″N 7°21′0.709″E
- Country: Germany
- State: Rhineland-Palatinate
- District: Kusel
- Municipal assoc.: Oberes Glantal

Government
  - Mayor (2019–24): Gerhard Kauf

Area
  - Total: 3.90 km^{2} (1.51 sq mi)
- Elevation: 313 m (1,027 ft)

Population (2025-12-31)
  - Total: 778
  - Density: 199/km^{2} (517/sq mi)
- Time zone: UTC+01:00 (CET)
  - Summer (DST): UTC+02:00 (CEST)
- Postal codes: 66903
- Dialling codes: 06386
- Vehicle registration: KUS
- Website: www.ohmbach.de

Ohmbach is an Ortsgemeinde – a municipality belonging to a Verbandsgemeinde, a kind of collective municipality – in the Kusel district in Rhineland-Palatinate, Germany. It belongs to the Verbandsgemeinde of Oberes Glantal, whose seat is in Schönenberg-Kübelberg.

== Geography ==
=== Location ===
Ohmbach stretches along the middle Ohmbach valley in the Western Palatinate between Herschweiler-Pettersheim and Brücken. Two brooks, one each side of the Ohmbach, empty into this river here. One of these, the Weitersbach, which flows from the east and also rises within Ohmbach's limits, runs through a valley that has also been built up. The mountains on the valleys’ sides reach heights of well over 300 m above sea level, with the highest being the Knechtsberg (387 m). The municipal area measures 390 ha, of which 58 ha is wooded.

=== Neighbouring municipalities ===
Ohmbach borders in the northeast on the municipality of Herschweiler-Pettersheim, in the east on the municipality of Steinbach am Glan, in the south on the municipality of Brücken, in the southwest on the municipality of Dittweiler, in the west on the municipality of Altenkirchen and in the northwest on the municipality of Krottelbach. Ohmbach also meets the municipality of Frohnhofen at a single point in the northwest.

=== Municipality’s layout ===
Today's village of Ohmbach grew out of two original centres bearing the names Ober-Ohmbach and Nieder-Ohmbach (“Upper” and “Nether” Ohmbach), the latter of which was originally named Weitersbach. Ober-Ohmbach's houses clustered around a mediaeval church in the middle of a graveyard that stood on a mountain spur, while Nieder-Ohmbach stretched out on a hill south of the Weitersbach. The two villages on each side of the through road on the brook's right bank long ago grew together. A newer residential area with a big new building zone with a fire station, a kindergarten and a playground stretches beneath a mountain slope on the Ohmbach's left bank. Here, too, stands the Catholic church, built in 1970 (the mediaeval one is today Evangelical). The sporting ground with its clubhouse likewise lies on the Ohmbach's left bank on Sportplatzstraße (“Sporting Ground Street”). The village owns two graveyards, the one in Ober-Ohmbach with its mortuary lies in the north end on Friedhofstraße (“Graveyard Street”), and the one in Nieder-Ohmbach is to be found on the through road south of the village.

== History ==
=== Antiquity ===
Bearing witness to early settlers in the area are prehistoric barrows within Ohmbach's own limits and also on land held by all the neighbouring municipalities. A great barrow from an unknown time lies on the heights of the Knechtenberg, but it is damaged, reportedly after having been half dug away in 1945 by the Wehrmacht. Gallo-Roman times, too, left their traces. The remnants of a villa rustica were unearthed as long ago as the 19th century. Reliefs from Roman times were built into the mediaeval churchtower. The originals of these spolia are now kept at the Historisches Museum Speyer.

=== Middle Ages ===
When the villages of Ohmbach and Weitersbach were founded is something that is now unknown. They do not appear in the Polyptique, the late-9th-century taxation register from the Abbey of Saint-Remi handed down by Guérard. This is a clue that suggests that they did not then belong to the Remigiusland. With a fair degree of certainty, they both lay within the Free Imperial Domain (Reichsland). Sometime after their founding, perhaps as far back as the 8th century or even earlier, their shared history was set asunder when each one found itself in a different lordly domain. Weitersbach long remained in the Reichsland, whereas Ohmbach passed as a Frankish king's donation into the ownership of the Archbishopric of Mainz sometime before 976. Ohmbach thus did not belong, as often assumed, from its founding to the Remigiusland, but rather was held, like the villages of the parish of Niederkirchen in the Oster valley, by the Archbishopric. A place named Ovenbach, mentioned in 967 in connection with the Saviour's Chapel (Salvatorkapelle) in Frankfurt, cannot be the same place as this one in the Palatinate, for in the course of a reorganization of the bishoprics within the Archbishopric of Mainz on the Rhine’s left bank by Archbishop Willigis beginning in 976, Ohmbach passed into the ownership of Disibodenberg Abbey. Willigis raised Disibodenberg to a middle centre among Mainz holdings on the Rhine's left bank outside the city of Mainz itself. A record from the time documenting this deed has unfortunately not been preserved, but its content has reached the present day through restitution documents from 1108 and 1128. In 1112, Count Gerlach I founded the County of Veldenz and at the same time took over the Vogtei over extensive ecclesiastical landholds, among them Disibodenberg Abbey and the Remigiusland. About the middle of the 13th century, the Benedictine monastery at Disibodenberg was dissolved and the building complex was taken over by Cistercians from the Otterberg Monastery. It thus became possible for Count Gerlach V to buy up Disibodenberg's church property. It was in this way that Ohmbach and Niederkirchen came to the Remigiusland only quite late. Gerlach V of Veldenz bequeathed the parish of Ohmbach to the Werschweiler (now Wörschweiler) Monastery, under whose ownership it remained until the time of the Reformation. In 1444, the County of Veldenz met its end when Count Friedrich III of Veldenz died without a male heir. His daughter Anna wed King Ruprecht's son Count Palatine Stephan. By uniting his own Palatine holdings with the now otherwise heirless County of Veldenz – his wife had inherited the county, but not her father's title – and by redeeming the hitherto pledged County of Zweibrücken, Stephan founded a new County Palatine, as whose comital residence he chose the town of Zweibrücken: the County Palatine – later Duchy – of Palatinate-Zweibrücken, to which Ohmbach (Oberohmbach), too, belonged. Parts of the Reichsland with the village of Weitersbach in the court district of Kübelberg were acquired in 1375 by Elector Palatine Ruprecht I as an Imperial pledge. He handed the court district of Kübelberg on to the Counts of Sponheim. In 1437, however, it passed back, along with Weitersbach, to the Electorate of the Palatinate.

=== Modern times ===
Even after the Middle Ages, the names Ohmbach and Weitersbach still kept cropping up in records. During the time of the Reformation, Ohmbach lay in the Duchy of Palatinate-Zweibrücken while Weitersbach belonged to the Electorate of the Palatinate. Ohmbach remained part of Zweibrücken until feudalism itself was swept away by the French Revolution. Weitersbach remained at first with the Electorate of the Palatinate. Sometime after 1600, the name Weitersbach disappeared from the historical record and was replaced with the name Nieder-Ohmbach, while the village that had hitherto been known as Ohmbach assumed the name Ober-Ohmbach. The Thirty Years' War swept over the land, which was also laid waste in French King Louis XIV’s wars of conquest. At the height of the Thirty Years' War, many villagers died, not only from the war's effects, but also from the Plague. Survivors fled. The villages were revived when newcomers settled there. It must be borne in mind, though, that many of these settlers, especially the ones in the Electorate of the Palatinate lands, were instruments of Louis XIV's policy, which favoured Catholic settlers. Only in the course of the late 18th century did population figures once more begin to grow healthily, and then began emigration. In 1779, the two villages for the first time found themselves under the same lordship once Nieder-Ohmbach, along with all other villages in the hitherto Electorate of the Palatinate court district of Kübelberg, was exchanged against villages on the Nahe held by Zweibrücken. Thus, Nieder-Ohmbach experienced a brief interlude as a Zweibrücken holding, but this lasted only about a decade before the French Revolution broke out.

==== Recent times ====
French Revolutionary troops showed up in 1793, and in 1801, the French annexed the German lands on the Rhine’s left bank to France. Ober-Ohmbach and Nieder-Ohmbach now formed for the first time a single municipality under the name Commune d’Ohmbach, which lay in the Mairie (“Mayoralty”) of Konken, the Canton of Kusel, the Arrondissement of Birkenfeld and the Department of Sarre. After Napoleon’s final defeat, the Congress of Vienna drew new boundaries yet again. After a transitional time, Ohmbach was grouped into the bayerischer Rheinkreis, later known as Rheinpfalz (“Rhenish Palatinate”), an exclave of the Kingdom of Bavaria in 1816, within the Landcommissariat (today Landkreis or district) of Kusel and the Canton of Kusel. The lowest administrative units were the Bürgermeistereien (“mayoralties”). The still united Ohmbach belonged to the Bürgermeisterei of Konken, which from 1821 to 1843 was headed by mayor Mehl from Konken. Under this mayor, the united municipality of Ohmbach was once again split in two, becoming Oberohmbach and Niederohmbach. In 1877 and 1888, attempts to reunite the two villages failed. In the late 1920s and early 1930s, the Nazi Party (NSDAP) did not become quite as popular in Ohmbach as in some other places in the district. In the 1928 Reichstag elections, only 0.9% of the local votes went to Adolf Hitler’s party, but by the 1930 Reichstag elections, this had grown, albeit slightly, to 3.1%. By the time of the 1933 Reichstag elections, after Hitler had already seized power, the Nazis fared no better than 21.1% in terms of local support (as against 92.5% in Horschbach or 90% in Ehweiler, for instance). Nevertheless, Hitler's overall success in these elections paved the way for his Enabling Act of 1933 (Ermächtigungsgesetz), thus starting the Third Reich in earnest. Only in 1936, under the Nazis, did it become possible to reunite the two villages. Ohmbach has been one municipality ever since. In 1952, a new Bürgermeisterei of Herschweiler-Pettersheim was founded, to which belonged, besides the mayoral seat, Ohmbach, Krottelbach and Langenbach. In the course of administrative restructuring in Rhineland-Palatinate, Ohmbach was grouped as an Ortsgemeinde into the Verbandsgemeinde of Schönenberg-Kübelberg in 1972.

=== Population development ===
Ohmbach was originally a village characterized by agriculture, though even in the 19th century, the local diamond-cutting industry was growing, offering earning opportunities for many villagers. In the time after the Second World War, this industry was given up, and those seeking work did so mainly outside the village. With respect to membership in Christian denominations, it can be noted that about the same number of Protestants and Catholics live in the village, whereas historically, owing to the territorial development in feudal times outlined above, most of the Protestants lived in the former village of Oberohmbach, and most of the Catholics in Niederohmbach. This difference is becoming blurred nowadays.

The following table shows population development over the centuries for Ohmbach, with some figures broken down by religious denomination:

| Year | 1609 | 1825 | 1835 | 1871 | 1905 | 1939 | 1961 | 2003 | 2007 |
| Total | 55* | 363 | 450 | 530 | 528 | 688 | 836 | 800 | 843 |
| Catholic | – | 236 | | | | | 413 |
| Evangelical | 55 | 127 | | | | | 419 |

*Oberohmbach

=== Municipality’s name ===
Ohmbach's name is understood to mean a village on the like-named brook. On the other hand, it could be that the brook is named after the village, for the Ohmbach originally bore several names drawn from villages through which it flowed. Thus, a Frank named Ovo may have founded the village. The name would therefore mean “Ovo’s Brook”. In a 977 document issued by Otto III, Holy Roman Emperor, the villages name appears as Ouenbach, and in an 1128 document issued by Archbishop Adalbert of Mainz as Ovenbach. In 1460 the village was called Obenbach, in 1545 Ombach and in 1629 Ohmbach. Beginning in the 17th century, the names Oberohmbach and Niederohmbach crop up. The name Weitersbach for Niederohmbach is drawn from the smaller brook that flows by the village, later emptying onto the Ohmbach. As Weytersbach, this name can be found in a 1541 border description of the court district of Kusel, and in the description of the Oberamt of Lichtenberg by Johannes Hoffmann as Weittersbach (Daran stoßen zusammen die Bännen Ohmbach, Steinbach und Weittersbach). Weitersbach would have been founded by a Frank named Wither or Witheri.

=== Vanished villages ===
Southeast of Ohmbach once lay a village called Remmweiler, sometimes also wrongly named as Rennweiler, bearing witness to which today are only rural cadastral toponyms. According to researchers Dolch and Greule, its name is explained by its having been founded by somebody named Ramno, and thus the name means “Ramno’s Homestead”.

== Religion ==
With a fair amount of certainty, Ohmbach was as long ago as the Early Middle Ages the location of a church and a parish hub. At some unknown time, this parish passed into the ownership of the Archbishopric of Mainz. It is known for certain that Archbishop Willigis transferred the Church of Ohmbach into the ownership of Disibodenberg Abbey in 976. Hence, it seems unlikely that the church would have been owned only one year later by the Saviour's Chapel (Salvatorkapelle) in Frankfurt, as it would seem to say in Emperor Otto II's 977 document acknowledging such ownership. About 1250, the Benedictine abbey at Disibodenberg was dissolved, and the Counts of Veldenz bought up part of the monastery's holdings. Among these was the parish of Ohmbach, which Count Gerlach V bequeathed in 1258 to Wörschweiler Abbey. In the time of the Reformation, the monastery was dissolved and its property passed into the ownership of the Dukes of Palatinate-Zweibrücken. This development applied only to the village then known as Ohmbach, and not to the then separate village of Weitersbach in the Free Imperial Domain (Reichsland) and later in the Electorate of the Palatinate Imperial pledged territory. Dwellers of both villages belonged in the Reformation's early days to the Lutheran faith, but those in Ohmbach (Oberohmbach) had to convert in 1588 on Count Palatine (Duke) Johannes I's orders to Reformed belief according to John Calvin (Calvinism). After the Thirty Years' War, religious freedom was theoretically possible, though the old relationships for the most part stood. In Zweibrücken-held Ohmbach, the Calvinist faith held its own. Lutherans were promoted by the Swedish kings who now ruled the Duchy – mostly in the towns and cities among officials – while Catholics enjoyed something similar on a lesser scale during the time of French French King Louis XIV’s wars of conquest. In the Electorate of the Palatinate-held Weitersbach, on the other hand, the Roman Catholic faith enjoyed strong promotion after the 1697 Treaty of Ryswick, which ended the Nine Years' War (known in Germany as the Pfälzischer Erbfolgekrieg, or War of the Palatine Succession). The upshot was that Ohmbach inhabitants all remained Protestant, whereas Weitersbach inhabitants all returned to Catholicism. The old Romanesque church had fallen into disrepair by the late 18th century and was replaced in the years from 1779 to 1785 with a Baroque hall church, although the mediaeval churchtower with its Roman spolia was largely preserved. The Calvinists united in 1817 with the Lutherans in the Protestant Union. In 1832, the old parish of Ohmbach was dissolved as the Protestant community was taken up by the church community of Altenkirchen. In 1954, within the deaconry of Kusel, the pastoral community of Herschweiler-Pettersheim was newly founded, to which also Ohmbach, Krottelbach and Langenbach belonged. The Catholic Christians got their own church in 1970, the Liebfrauenkirche (“Church of Our Dear Lady”). They belong today to the Church of Brücken with their chapel of ease in Ohmbach, while the Protestant church within the deaconry of Kusel functions as a chapel of ease of Herschweiler-Pettersheim.

== Politics ==
=== Municipal council ===
The council is made up of 12 council members, who were elected by proportional representation at the municipal election held on 7 June 2009, and the honorary mayor as chairman.

The municipal election held on 7 June 2009 yielded the following results:

| Year | SPD | CDU | FWG | Total |
|---|---|---|---|---|
| 2009 | 4 | 7 | 1 | 12 seats |
| 2004 | 3 | 7 | 2 | 12 seats |

"FWG" is a "free voters' group".

=== Mayor ===
Ohmbach's mayor is Gerhard Kauf.

=== Coat of arms ===
The municipality's arms might be described thus: Per pale sable a lion rampant Or armed and langued gules and Or issuant from base a bishop's staff sinister of the third surmounted by a fess abased wavy azure.

The charge on the dexter (armsbearer's right, viewer's left) side is a representation of the Palatine Lion, while that on the sinister (armsbearer's left, viewer's right) side is supposed to recall the village's former allegiance to the Archbishopric of Mainz. The wavy fess (horizontal stripe) stands for the village's namesake brook, the Ohmbach. The arms have been borne since 1971 when they were approved by the now defunct Rheinhessen-Pfalz Regierungsbezirk administration in Neustadt an der Weinstraße.

== Culture and sightseeing ==
=== Buildings ===
The following are listed buildings or sites in Rhineland-Palatinate’s Directory of Cultural Monuments:

- Kirchenstraße 16 – Protestant church; Romanesque tower, 12th century, height added to both main building and tower 1780, architect Philipp Heinrich Hellermann, Zweibrücken, spire possibly from the 19th century
- Kirchenstraße 24 – former Protestant school; one-floor plastered building upon stone-block pedestal, Rundbogenstil, 1835/1842

==== Other buildings ====
The Wartturm was built in 2005 somewhat below the top of the lookout mountain called the Wartenstein, which stands 375 m above sea level, and this tower is itself now used as a lookout. It is part of the Begehbares Geschichtsbuch (“Accessible” or “Walk-in History Book”) that leads through the Verbandsgemeinde of Schönenberg-Kübelberg with three hiking loops and many points of interest.

=== Regular events ===
Ohmbach holds its kermis (church consecration festival) on the third weekend in October. Local customs are quite similar to those in neighbouring villages.

=== Clubs ===
Ohmbach has the following clubs:

- CDU-Ortsverein — Christian Democratic Union of Germany local chapter
- Freizeitclub — leisure club
- Katholischer Frauenverein — Catholic women's club
- Landfrauenverein — countrywomen's club
- Obst- und Gartenbauverein — fruitgrowing and gardening club
- Pensionärverein — pensioners’ club
- Pfälzischer Bauern- und Winzerverein — Palatine Farmers’ and Winemakers’ Association
- Sängervereinigung — singers’ union
- Schachclub — chess club
- SPD-Ortsverein — Social Democratic Party of Germany local chapter
- Sportverein — sport club
- Turnverein mit Musikzug — gymnastic club with marching band

== Economy and infrastructure ==
=== Economic structure ===
Ohmbach, which had originally been purely a farming village, was already home in the 19th century to workers, who mostly earned their livelihoods at the nearby coalmines in the Saarland. Beginning in 1888, there were also job opportunities at Isidor Trifuß's diamond-cutting workshop at the Neumühle (“New Mill”) between Ohmbach and Brücken. Later, such workshops were set up in Ohmbach itself, often small family businesses. After the Second World War, one fourth of the local workforce was for a time employed at the workshops. The diamond-cutting industry in the Brücken has subsequently declined. Many of today's workforce must now commute to jobs. Local businesses include a florist with a postal agency, a car dealership and several inns

=== Education ===
In 1604, Nickel Simenreiter became known for being Ohmbach's first schoolteacher. Hence, it is also known that there was a school in the village quite early on, although it did not survive the Thirty Years' War. During the 18th century, the village already had year-round schooling and not, like so many other villages, merely a winter school (a school geared towards an agricultural community's practical needs, held in the winter, when farm families had a bit more time to spare). Documents from 1776 say that the 49-year-old unwed school assistant Theobald Müller had only a parlour and one bedroom available to him at his dwelling. Müller was still on the job in 1795. In 1798, a new schoolhouse was built in Oberohmbach, and it also contained a roomier dwelling for the schoolteacher. In 1834, two further schoolhouses were built, one Catholic and one Protestant. These two buildings were both used as schools until 1961, when a new, modern school was built, but schooling was still denominationally segregated. In the course of scholastic reorganization, Catholic Hauptschule students began attending the Mittelpunktschule ("midpoint school", a central school, designed to eliminate smaller outlying schools) in Brücken in 1966, while their Protestant counterparts went to the school in Herschweiler-Pettersheim. Beginning in 1970, the primary school, which was still in Ohmbach, was run as a Christian communal school. Today, all primary school pupils attend the school in Herschweiler-Pettersheim, while all Hauptschule students attend their school in Schönenberg-Kübelberg. Other kinds of secondary schools and special schools are all to be found in Kusel. The nearest universities are Saarland University, Kaiserslautern University of Technology and the University of Trier.

=== Transport ===
Ohmbach lies on Landesstraße 350, which links Konken with Brücken. Running southeast of the village is the Autobahn A 6 (Saarbrücken–Mannheim), while to the northeast runs the Autobahn A 62 (Kaiserslautern–Trier). The nearest interchanges with the former are at Bruchmühlbach and Waldmohr (each 11 km away), while the nearest ones with the latter are at Kusel (10 km away) and Glan-Münchweiler (12 km away). Serving Glan-Münchweiler is Glan-Münchweiler station on the Landstuhl–Kusel railway. Other stations are to be found in Kusel, Sankt Wendel and Homburg.
