= Dittweiler =

- Municipality
- Coat of arms

- Location of Dittweiler within Kusel district
- Interactive map of Dittweiler
- Location within Germany Location within Rhineland-Palatinate
- Coordinates: 49°25′46″N 7°20′12″E
- Country: Germany
- State: Rhineland-Palatinate
- District: Kusel
- Municipal assoc.: Oberes Glantal

Government
  - Mayor (2019–24): Winfried Karl Cloß

Area
  - Total: 5.63 km^{2} (2.17 sq mi)
- Elevation: 278 m (912 ft)

Population (2025-12-31)
  - Total: 864
  - Density: 153/km^{2} (397/sq mi)
- Time zone: UTC+01:00 (CET)
  - Summer (DST): UTC+02:00 (CEST)
- Postal codes: 66903
- Dialling codes: 06386
- Vehicle registration: KUS
- Website: www.dittweiler.de

Dittweiler is an Ortsgemeinde – a municipality belonging to a Verbandsgemeinde, a kind of collective municipality – in the Kusel district in Rhineland-Palatinate, Germany. It belongs to the Verbandsgemeinde of Oberes Glantal, whose seat is in Schönenberg-Kübelberg.

== Geography ==
=== Location ===
The municipality lies in the Kohlbach valley the Western Palatinate at an elevation of roughly 270 m above sea level, to a great extent on roads that run parallel to the Kohlbach and the Romersbach, which empties into it here. As in the neighbouring village of Altenkirchen, much of the former cropland within Dittweiler's municipal limits has been given over to meadow orchards, particularly ones planted with sweet cherry (there are some 7,000 fruit trees). The nearby mountains to the village's west, towards Breitenbach, reach more than 400 m above sea level (Hartenberg 435 m), and to the east, more than 350 m (Wartenstein 375 m). Wooded land stretches out particularly in the municipal area's west. The municipal area itself measures 563 ha, of which 168 ha is wooded.

=== Neighbouring municipalities ===
Dittweiler borders in the north on the municipality of Altenkirchen, in the northeast on the municipality of Ohmbach, in the east on the municipality of Brücken, in the south on the municipality of Schönenberg-Kübelberg, in the southwest on the municipality of Dunzweiler and in the west on the municipality of Breitenbach.

=== Municipality’s layout ===
The T-junction where Stammhofstraße meets Sankt Wendeler Straße can be seen as the heart of the village. Here stands the prominent and well known 1936 war memorial. Not far up the street stands an old smithy building, which has been preserved along with its equipment. Sankt Wendeler Straße (Landesstraße 355) is a thoroughfare running north-south, and standing along it are most of the village's houses. Stammhofstraße leads to the brook and then, after a great bow in the street to the south (left), the way eventually leads to the Romersbach, which in the middle of a recreation area flows through a pond, the Römerweiher. It is here that a new village centre has arisen around the village community centre, itself built between 1981 and 1983. Spreading west from here are new building zones (Römerstraße, Seewald). Branching off Stammhofstraße towards the north is Freibergstraße, which runs parallel to the Kohlbach's right bank in the village's north end. The graveyard can be reached along Friedhofstraße (whose name, fittingly enough, means “Graveyard Street”), which branches off eastwards near the old smithy on Sankt Wendeler Straße. Branching off Sankt Wendeler Straße in the village's north end is Schulstraße (or locally, Steinkaut), which leads, not surprisingly (for its name means “School Street”), to the former schoolhouse.

== History ==
=== Antiquity ===
Even in prehistoric times, man inhabited the area. Dittweiler's municipal area harbours witnesses to these early settlers. Still standing in the rural cadastral area named the Kaufmannsbösch are two unopened Celtic Bronze Age or Iron Age barrows measuring 11 and 18 m in diameter. Like most nearby villages, Dittweiler can also boast traces of Roman presence. An old parish description records “Found in Dittweiler near the old schoolhouse near the graveyard were … unambiguous traces of a Roman settlement”. Remnants of a Roman villa rustica have also been unearthed at the Lacherwald (forest). Over the years, the remnants of three Roman farms and an ancient high road have been brought to light.

=== Middle Ages ===
The lands around Dittweiler belonged to the Kaiserslautern (both the town and the castle of that name) Imperial Estates (the Reichsland), and to the court region of Kübelberg, which beginning in 1312 was taken over by a whole succession of secular lordships as an Imperial pledge (Electoral Palatinate, the County of Veldenz, the County of Sponheim). The rural cadastral names Künschberg and Künschwoog (that is, Königsberg and Königswoog, Königs being German for “king’s”) still recall the time when the area was part of the Reichsland. In 1316, Dittweiler had its first documentary mention, according to which a lesser nobleman named Reinfried de Curti acknowledged ownership of part of his holdings in Dittweiler (Dydewilre), with which he had been enfeoffed by Waldgrave Johannes von Dhaun. In 1438, Dittweiler and the village mill (Falken Hansen Mühle) appeared in the Sponheimer Gültbuch, a taxation book. In this year, the County of Sponheim came to an end, and the Amt of Kübelberg, along with Dittweiler, passed back to Electoral Palatinate. In the late 15th century, the Junkers of Leyen, among others, acquired landholds in Dittweiler. The Prince-Electors of the Palatinate remained the feudal and territorial lords until 1779. From 1774 come the border stones that can still be found west of the village, which once marked the border with Palatinate-Zweibrücken.

=== Modern times ===
In 1547, the Zweibrücker Oberamtsbannbuch mentioned the ditch in the southwest of Dittweiler's municipal area, a fortification that by that time had fallen into disrepair. In 1556, Prince-Elector Ottheinrich introduced the Reformation for all his subjects. This was, of course, obligatory. Dittweiler then appeared in the 1564 description of the Oberamt of Zweibrücken by the geometer Tilemann Stella, which described, among other things, a boundary stone with a cross on it that marked the limit between Duntzweiller and Ditweiller (a transcription and translation of this section of the book is to be found at the Dunzweiler article). In 1600, Master Forester Philipp Vellmann toured the villages in the Amt of Kübelberg on Prince-Elector Friedrich IV's behalf, and on the tour described Dittweiler's environs with its dales, woods and ponds, also meanwhile noting the mill, which was now called “Arnold Mühl”. In a 1610 description in the Altenkirchen parish “competence book”, it says that Dittweiler did indeed belong to Electoral Palatinate, but that the tithe was owed to the Zweibrücken monastery of Wörschweiler, and thereby to John II, Count Palatine of Zweibrücken, and that one third of this tithe was to go to the likewise Zweibrücken-held Church of Ohmbach. As well, the lands held by the Counts of Leyen were mentioned once again. According to a 1611 Electoral Palatinate Oberamt of Lautern taxation register, a listing of, among other things, all Dittweiler's family heads was undertaken, according to which 18 families then lived in the village, representing roughly 70 to 80 inhabitants. The horrors of the Thirty Years' War brought the village hardship and woe, as was so in every other village in the area and all around Kusel. By the time it was over, there was almost nobody still living in the village. Only in 1656 (eight years after the war ended) were four families again living in Dittweiler, of whom only one had been living there before the war. Population development stagnated as a result of French King Louis XIV's wars of conquest until the late 17th century. In 1684, only three families were living in Dittweiler. Only in the early 18th century did population growth once again begin in earnest with great numbers of new settlers coming from, among other countries, Switzerland. In 1779, the Electoral Palatinate Amt of Kübelberg was traded for the hitherto Zweibrücken-held villages of Duchroth and Oberhausen and also part of the village of Niederkirchen. Thus, Dittweiler, too, belonged until the fall of all feudal states in the French Revolution to the Duchy of Palatinate-Zweibrücken, within which it lay in the Oberamt of Homburg and the Schultheißerei of Waldmohr.

==== Recent times ====
In 1793, the first French Revolutionary troops appeared in the area, and in 1801, France annexed the German lands on the Rhine’s left bank. During the time of French rule, which ended in 1814, Dittweiler lay in the Mairie (“Mayoralty”) of Waldmohr, the Canton of Waldmohr, the Arrondissement of Saarbrücken and the Department of Sarre, whose seat lay at Trier. In 1814, the French withdrew from the annexed lands on the left bank, and Dittweiler was at first assigned to the district of Ottweiler. After a transitional period, the Baierischer Rheinkreis came into being in 1816, later known as the Bavarian Rhenish Palatinate in the Kingdom of Bavaria. This had been awarded to Bavaria by the Congress of Vienna. Dittweiler passed in 1818 to the Landkommissariat (later Bezirksamt and then Landkreis, or district) of Homburg and the Bürgermeisterei (“Mayoralty”) of Altenkirchen in the canton of Waldmohr. In 1848 and 1849, the Kohlbach valley was held to be a hotbed of the revolutionary movement in the Palatinate. In the 19th century, many impoverished people left the Kohlbach valley and emigrated to the United States, mainly to Ohio. In the late 20th century, Jerry L. Ross, a descendant of the emigrants, discovered his Dittweiler roots. Ross was a NASA astronaut, and eventually, he took the Dittweiler municipal flag with him into space on mission STS-55 (also called mission D-2; Space Shuttle Columbia; 26 April 1993 – 6 May 1993) on which he was a Mission Specialist (the mission had another German connection: the two payload specialists, Ulrich Walter and Hans Schlegel, were both German). After the First World War, the district of Homburg was grouped into the British- and French-occupied Saar, but the canton of Waldmohr remained in the Free State – no longer Kingdom, for both the King and the Kaiser had abdicated – of Bavaria, and thereby in Germany as well. It belonged with an administrative outpost to the Bezirksamt of Kusel. In 1940, the outpost was dissolved and merged into the Kusel district. In the course of administrative restructuring in Rhineland-Palatinate in the late 1960s and early 1970s, the Bürgermeisterei of Altenkirchen was finally dissolved. Until 2017, Dittweiler belonged as a self-administering Ortsgemeinde to the Verbandsgemeinde of Schönenberg-Kübelberg.

=== Population development ===
Dittweiler was a farming village and is even now widely known for its cherry growing. Records show that the first small coalmine opened in the late 18th century. Besides agriculture, small farmers could now earn their livelihoods as miners. In the late 19th and early 20th centuries, the collieries were shut down, forcing almost all coalminers to commute to the pits in the Saar coalfields. Beginning about 1870, most workers in Dittweiler worked at the Frankenholz colliery, and then later also the Nordfeld colliery. Thus came a general shift from farming village to farmer-miners’ village. It was in this time that the nickname Waffele arose. Whole batches of Grombeerwaffele (potato waffles; the Standard German word is Kartoffelwaffeln) were brought by miners to work and served as nourishing and cheap weekly victuals in the workers’ dormitory. In Dittweiler itself, diamond-cutting workshops began to arise beginning in 1909. Population figures were rising quickly even as long ago as the 18th century, although this growth later stagnated for a while in the 19th century. In the 20th century, the population almost doubled. With regard to religious alignment, the inhabitants were once almost without exception Evangelical, and even today, Catholics, followers of other faiths and those with no religion are a clear minority. Dittweiler is nowadays characterized by its residential function, and is home to people of the most varied of occupations, most of whom commute to jobs outside the village.

The following table shows population development over the centuries for Dittweiler, with some figures broken down by religious denomination:

Year	1825	1835	1871	1905	1939	1961	2004
Total	382	425	430	541	693	814	976
Catholic	39					55
Evangelical	343					755
Other	–					4

=== Municipality’s name ===
The village's name has the common German placename ending —weiler, which as a standalone word means “hamlet” (originally “homestead”), to which is prefixed the name Dioto which can be taken as a Frankish personal name. Dittweiler, therefore, was originally “Dioto’s homestead”. Dittweiler had its first documentary mention in 1316 as Dydewilre. Other names that it has borne over the ages are, among others: Diedwilr (1437), Diedweiller (1547), Didweiler (1571), Dietweiler (1824).

=== Vanished villages ===
In the far west of Dittweiler's municipal area once lay a village named Hundhausen, which was named as a vanished village as early as 1564 in Tilemann Stella's writings. It might have been a village that grew out of a lordly estate held by a lord named Hun or Hundo, a Frankish administrative official.

== Religion ==
Before the Reformation, Dittweiler belonged to the Parish Church of Ohmbach and therefore evidently shared its history. After Prince-Elector Ottheinrich had introduced the Reformation into Electoral Palatinate in 1556, Dittweiler was grouped into the parish of Altenkirchen. On the principle of cuius regio, eius religio, the inhabitants had to adopt the faith thus prescribed for Electoral Palatinate, which was Lutheranism, as taught by, of course, Martin Luther. Owing to the former allegiance to the Church of Ohmbach, however, there were still strong ties to the Wörschweiler Monastery, which lay in the County Palatine of Zweibrücken, and to which the village owed one third of its tithes. These were paid to the Dukes of Palatinate-Zweibrücken, who had taken the monastery estate into their ownership after the Reformation. After the Thirty Years' War, there was freedom of religion, and newcomers to the now depopulated village brought other Christian denominations with them. These were mostly Calvinists, although there were also a few Catholics among them. Their share of the population in the early 19th century was almost 10%, but nowadays it is somewhat more than 5%.

== Politics ==
=== Municipal council ===
The council is made up of 12 council members, who were elected by proportional representation at the municipal election held on 7 June 2009, and the honorary mayor as chairman.

The municipal election held on 7 June 2009 yielded the following results:

Year	SPD	FWG	Total
2009	7	5	12 seats
2004	7	5	12 seats

“FWG” is Freie Wählergruppe Rheinland-Pfalz (“Free Voters’ Group of Rhineland-Palatinate”).

=== Mayor ===
Dittweiler's mayor is Winfried Karl Cloß.

=== Coat of arms ===
The municipality's arms might be described thus: Argent a bend sinister wavy azure between a cherry sprig leafed of one and fructed of two slipped proper and a hammer and pick per saltire sable.

The “bend sinister wavy” (wavy slanted stripe) is held to represent the local brook, the Kohlbach, on which the village lies, while the cherry sprig on the dexter (armsbearer's right, viewer's left) side refers to the still important sweet cherry growing operations in the municipality. The hammer and pick charge on the sinister (armsbearer's left, viewer's right) side refers to the former coalmining in the local area and the old mining tradition.

The arms have been borne since 1982 when they were approved by the now defunct Regierungsbezirk administration in Neustadt an der Weinstraße.

== Culture and sightseeing ==
=== Buildings ===
The following are listed buildings or sites in Rhineland-Palatinate’s Directory of Cultural Monuments:

- Near St. Wendeler Straße 71 – warriors’ memorial, monumental soldier sculpture, 1936, by August Deubzer, Kaiserslautern
- St. Wendeler Straße 73 – Alte Schmiede (“Hiwwelschmidd”, “Old Smithy”); one-floor brick building, 1872, conversion 1908; technical equipment from 1920

=== Natural monuments ===
Described as natural monuments in Dittweiler are two trees, the Weisenbaum (an oak on the way to Breitenbach) and the Luitpoldlinde (a limetree on Schulstraße).

=== Sport and leisure ===
Cultural events in Dittweiler are mainly defined by the many local clubs, but also by the municipality's efforts to care for recreational facilities (such as the Römerweiher pond and hiking trails). An amply sized village community centre, the Bürgerhaus, was built in 1981-1983.

=== Clubs ===
Dittweiler has the following clubs:

- Freie Wählergruppe Ortsverein — “Free Voters” political group, local chapter
- Förderverein der Freiwilligen Feuerwehr — fire brigade promotional association
- Gesangverein Frohsinn — singing club
- Hundesportverein — dog sport club
- Landfrauenverein — countrywomen's club
- Natur- und Vogelschutzverein — nature and bird conservation club
- Obst- und Gartenbauverein — fruitgrowing and gardening club
- Pensionärverein — pensioners’ club
- Sportverein Kohlbachtal — sport club
- SPD – Ortsverein — Social Democratic Party of Germany, local chapter
- Schachclub — chess club
- Tischtennisverein — table tennis club
- Ski-Club Kohlbachtal — skiing club
- VdK-Gruppe — advocacy group
- Wutzeclub 77

== Economy and infrastructure ==
=== Economic structure ===
Originally, most people in the village earned their livelihood at agriculture, and indeed, sweet cherry growing still enjoys a certain importance. A mill was mentioned as early as the 15th century, and was shut down in 1900. In the late 18th century, there were already two small mines in the municipal area, Nickelhöh and Unterdell, which employed about ten miners. In the early 19th century, itinerant peddling became a widely practised occupation in Dittweiler, with poorer villagers travelling throughout southern Germany hawking wares. They sold creamware, sanguine, whetstones, woodenware and wheel resin (this last item led to the nickname Harzkrämer – “resin dealer” – for a Dittweiler villager). From the late 19th century onwards, many inhabitants also sought livelihoods in the nearby Saar coalfields. The village developed bit by bit from a farming village into a worker-farmers’ village. Alongside full-time agricultural operations arose small farms worked by the so-called Bergmannsbauern (“miner-farmers”). Likewise from the 19th century onwards, diamond-cutting workshops opened, first in neighbouring villages, and then in 1909, the first major one, with five workbenches, appeared on the scene in Dittweiler. By 1936, Dittweiler still had 13 independent diamond-cutting workshops. After 1945, there were at first still seven, but over the decades that followed, even they shut up shop one by one. Today, Dittweiler is first and foremost a commuter village. Among the shops and small businesses that can be found here are a beverage company, a florist's shop, a company that installs sanitary and heating systems, a filling station that also sells tires, a cosmetic studio, two real estate agencies, a roofing company, a tile-laying shop, a structural engineering office and a metal construction firm. The Kreissparkasse Kusel (district savings bank) maintains an automated teller machine in the village, and VR-Bank Westpfalz (a credit union) has a branch in Altenkirchen.

=== Education ===
In 1784, after Dittweiler had become a Palatine Zweibrücken holding, the village got a winter school (a school geared towards an agricultural community's practical needs, held in the winter, when farm families had a bit more time to spare), which had replaced schooling in Altenkirchen, which the children had formerly attended, as the municipality wanted to free itself of its contributions to Altenkirchen. Beginning in 1786, the school was approved by the Duke and for ten years thereafter it enjoyed a subsidy of five Gulden from the ecclesiastical coffers. The winter school's head was at first Friedrich Rindt from Breitenbach. Beginning in 1791, school was taught by Johann Hettrich in Dittweiler, who was upbraided for failing to introduce summer school. In 1818, there were 70 children of school age, and the municipality was prepared to buy a plot for a schoolhouse. Officials from the Royal Chief Mayor's Office at Waldmohr took the view that a building for only one class was what was needed, and that the price for the plot of land on offer was too high. The architect Deckert from Homburg put together a plan. The projected cost of 776 Gulden likewise struck the Chief Mayor's Office as being much too high, and a further plan was demanded. At last, in 1826, the schoolhouse was ready, standing on what is today called Friedhofstraße. The following year, it was also given a belltower, through whose sound holes the rain got in and trickled down into the floor down below. This was put right by installing shutters over the sound holes. In 1831, a barn was likewise built on the school ground for the teacher's economic ends. The schoolhouse was actually too small right from the beginning, and so the municipality sold the old school and in 1873 a new one was built in a disused quarry on today's Schulstraße. Only in 1891 was a second classroom opened. In 1929, yet another schoolhouse was to be built, this time a rather bigger one, but once again the plan was rejected, and what happened instead amounted to a partial demolition of the existing building and the addition of an upper floor, which was finished in 1936. In 1970, Dittweiler still had 87 schoolchildren. The school was nevertheless dissolved and the primary school pupils and Hauptschule students then went first to the corresponding schools in Altenkirchen and Brücken. The schoolhouse was sold into private ownership. Today, Hauptschule students attend school at the Schönenberg-Kübelberg school centre, while the primary school pupils attend school in Brücken. Special schools are available in Kusel, and for lower classes also in Brücken for children with learning difficulties. Realschulen can be found at the Schönenberg-Kübelberg school centre and in Kusel, while there are Gymnasien in Kusel and Homburg. Universities are to be found in Kaiserslautern, Saarbrücken, Homburg and Trier. Years ago, a municipal kindergarten was built onto the municipal centre, and in 2005, a youth centre was also added.

=== Transport ===
Dittweiler lies on Landesstraße 355, which links Schönenberg-Kübelberg north of Altenkirchen with Landesstraße 552 (Quirnbach-Ottweiler). Kreisstraßen (District Roads) link Dittweiler with Breitenbach and Brücken. To the southeast runs the Autobahn A 6, while to the northeast lies the A 62 (Kaiserslautern–Trier). The nearest Autobahn interchanges each lie roughly 12 km away. These are near Glan-Münchweiler (A 62), Miesau (A 6) and Waldmohr (A 6). Glan-Münchweiler station is on the Landstuhl–Kusel railway and is served by Regionalbahn service RB 67, called the Glantalbahn (the name of which refers to the Glan Valley Railway, which shared some of the route of the Landstuhl–Kusel line, including the former junction at Glan-Münchweiler). Serving Sankt Wendel is a station on the Nahe Valley Railway (Bingen–Saarbrücken). Homburg Central Station is a station on the Mannheim–Saarbrücken railway. Each of these stations lies between 10 and 15 km away from Dittweiler.

== Famous people ==
=== Sons and daughters of the town ===
- Ernst Appel (1921–1979), postal official and author
- Kurt Lauer (1923–after 1955), Nazi functionary
- Werner Pfaff (??–??), administrative official and author
