= Altenkirchen (disambiguation) =

Altenkirchen may refer to:

- Altenkirchen, capital of the district of Altenkirchen, Rhineland-Palatinate, Germany
- Administrative divisions centered on this town:
  - Altenkirchen (district), Rhineland-Palatinate, Germany
  - Altenkirchen (Verbandsgemeinde), Rhineland-Palatinate, Germany
- Altenkirchen, Kusel, a municipality in the district of Kusel, Rhineland-Palatinate, Germany
- Altenkirchen, Mecklenburg-Vorpommern, a municipality in the district of Rügen, Mecklenburg-Vorpommern, Germany
