= Frohnhofen =

- Municipality
- Coat of arms

- Location of Frohnhofen within Kusel district
- Interactive map of Frohnhofen
- Location within Germany Location within Rhineland-Palatinate
- Coordinates: 49°27′13″N 7°18′01″E
- Country: Germany
- State: Rhineland-Palatinate
- District: Kusel
- Municipal assoc.: Oberes Glantal

Government
  - Mayor (2019–24): Thomas Weyrich

Area
  - Total: 3.86 km^{2} (1.49 sq mi)
- Elevation: 310 m (1,020 ft)

Population (2025-12-31)
  - Total: 448
  - Density: 116/km^{2} (301/sq mi)
- Time zone: UTC+01:00 (CET)
  - Summer (DST): UTC+02:00 (CEST)
- Postal codes: 66903
- Dialling codes: 06386
- Vehicle registration: KUS
- Website: www.frohnhofen.de

Frohnhofen is an Ortsgemeinde – a municipality belonging to a Verbandsgemeinde, a kind of collective municipality – in the Kusel district in Rhineland-Palatinate, Germany. It belongs to the Verbandsgemeinde of Oberes Glantal, whose seat is in Schönenberg-Kübelberg.

== Geography ==
=== Location ===
The municipality lies in the upper Kohlbach valley in the Western Palatinate on the state boundary with the Saarland at an elevation of roughly 300 m above sea level at the junction of two Landesstraßen. The Kohlbach itself, which is fed by several little brooks within the village, rises west of the village on the Hirschberg. The elevations within Frohnhofen’s municipal limits reach more than 400 m above sea level in the northernmost part of the municipal area. The western part is wooded. Here, on the Entenweiher ("Duckpond"), a major recreation complex has been built, with a cabin owned by the Pfälzerwaldverein (a hiking club). As with other municipalities in the Kohlbach valley, the heights are planted with cherry trees. The municipal area measures 387 ha, of which 96 ha is wooded.

=== Neighbouring municipalities ===
Frohnhofen borders in the northeast on the municipality of Krottelbach, in the south on the municipality of Altenkirchen, in the west on the municipality of Breitenbach and in the northwest on the town of Sankt Wendel. Frohnhofen also meets the municipality of Ohmbach at a single point in the east.

=== Constituent communities ===
Also belonging to Frohnhofen is the outlying homestead of Lindenhof.

=== Municipality’s layout ===
Frohnhofen takes the shape of a clump village whose streets meet in the village core in an almost star-shaped pattern. Still standing here are a few bigger farmhouses. Otherwise, one-family dwellings dominate the built-up area. The great multipurpose hall, the Bürgerzentrum ("Civic Centre") with its village fountain stands on the road to Altenkirchen, while the former schoolhouse is found on Schulstraße ("School Street").

== History ==
=== Antiquity ===
Even as early as prehistoric times, the area around Frohnhofen was inhabited by human beings, bearing witness to which are archaeological finds from the time. A group of five prehistoric barrows runs along a mountain comb in the Heidenbösch. Thus far, the time from which they stem has not been determined. A Celtic grave that yielded weapons as grave goods was inadvertently unearthed in 1994 during building work on the Sonnenberg. It is presumed that the area was settled continuously from the Bronze Age until the Roman conquest. There might have been a fairly long interruption in the otherwise continuous habitation of the area after the Romans withdrew and before the Franks took over the land.

=== Middle Ages ===
The area around Frohnhofen belonged in Frankish times to the Free Imperial Domain (Reichsland) around the town and castle of Kaiserslautern and more locally to the court of Kübelberg, which beginning in 1312 was held as an Imperial pledge by a whole succession of secular lordships (the Electorate of the Palatinate, the County of Veldenz, the County of Sponheim). This resulted in Frohnhofen most often being a border village, lying in the border lands where the Electorate of the Palatinate, the County Palatine of Zweibrücken and the Remigiusland met, and it was sometimes mentioned as being the seat of a lordly estate (whence the village’s name – see below). In the confirmed 1387 mention of the village as Frunhoven, the stress seems to fall more on Frohnhofen’s being a village at a lordly estate.

=== Modern times ===
In a 1541 Weistum (a Weistum – cognate with English wisdom – was a legal pronouncement issued by men learned in law in the Middle Ages and early modern times), the Electorate of the Palatinate-Zweibrücken border’s alignment is the central topic. It mentions Fronhoiffen, and is apparently identical to another document described as a Weistum dating from 1355. Yet another Weistum was handed down in 1545 by the lawmakers in Altenkirchen which dealt with all the contributions that Fronhofen had to make to the family Blick von Lichtenberg, who held lands in both Altenkirchen and Frohnhofen. Contained in the listings for Altenkirchen is a special contribution for fronhofen, which was obviously then seen as nothing more than an estate. In Tilemann Stella’s 1564 Beschreibung der Ämter Zweibrücken und Kirkel ("Description of the Ämter of Zweibrücken and Kirkel"), the border is described, and Frohnhofen is mentioned, once again: "Dieser marckstein stehet inn rotbuschen unnd schaidet Braitenbach unnd Fronhouen." ("This borderstone stands in red bushes and divides Breitenbach and Frohnhofen"; the part about "red bushes", or rotbuschen in the original text, might be a mistake for Rotbuchen – common beech trees). Even by this time, the village was still quite small. A 1592 Electorate of the Palatinate estimate listed the number of families as five, which would work out to roughly 20 inhabitants. Frohnhofen was lucky enough in the Thirty Years' War not to have the killing and destruction visited on it as so many other villages in the region did, often dying right out as a result. Nevertheless, the population was roughly halved, and Frohnhofen could now hardly even be called a village. Going by the names that are known, the people there at the time were ones who had already been there before the war. French King Louis XIV’s wars of conquest thwarted any population growth in the late 17th century, and in 1701, only four families were counted in Frohnhofen. In the 18th century, though, there was strong growth in population figures, and by the end of the century, emigration had even begun. In 1775, there were 110 inhabitants in 24 families living in Frohnhofen, and there were 17 private houses in the village and three communal houses. In 1779, Electorate of the Palatinate traded the Amt of Kübelberg for the hitherto Zweibrücken-held villages of Duchroth and Oberhausen and part of the village of Niederkirchen. Frohnhofen thereby became a Zweibrücken holding and belonged to that duchy until French Revolutionary troops marched in during 1793, belonging administratively to the Zweibrücken Oberamt of Homburg and the Schultheißerei of Waldmohr.

==== Recent times ====
In 1801, France annexed the German lands on the Rhine’s left bank. In Napoleonic times, which ended in 1814, Frohnhofen belonged to the Mairie (“Mayoralty”) of Waldmohr, the Canton of Waldmohr, the Arrondissement of Saarbrücken and the Department of Sarre, whose seat was at Trier. In 1814, the French withdrew from the German lands on the Rhine’s left bank. Frohnhofen passed first to the district of Ottweiler, and in 1816 to the Baierischer Rheinkreis, the later bayerische Rheinpfalz, the territory that the Congress of Vienna awarded to the Kingdom of Bavaria. With regard to local administration, Frohnhofen passed in 1818 to the Landkommissariat (later Bezirksamt and Landkreis, or rural district) of Homburg and the Bürgermeisterei ("Mayoralty") of Altenkirchen in the Canton of Waldmohr. In the 19th century, a great number of the impoverished populace left the village and emigrated to the United States, mainly to Ohio. After the First World War, the district of Homburg was ceded to the British- and French-occupied Saar. A remnant district centred on Waldmohr remained with Bavaria – now the Free State of Bavaria after the abdications of the last king of Bavaria and the Kaiser – and thus with Germany. It belonged with a branch location of the administration to the Bezirksamt of Kusel, which remained in existence until 1940. After the Waldmohr branch administration had been dissolved, this mayoralty belonged administratively to the district of Kusel. In the course of administrative restructuring in Rhineland-Palatinate, the Mayoralty of Altenkirchen was dissolved, and Frohnhofen became an Ortsgemeinde in the Verbandsgemeinde of Schönenberg-Kübelberg in 1972.

=== Population development ===
Frohnhofen was a farming village, also known for its cherry growing. Towards the end of the 18th century, collieries were opened in neighbouring villages, which also opened new earning opportunities to the inhabitants of Frohnhofen. Bit by bit, the village changed into one in which mostly miners lived, ones who were often called Bergmannsbauern ("miner-farmers"). From the early 20th century, diamond cutting in the area offered a further kind of livelihood. Population figures rose only slightly in the 19th century and in the early decades of the 20th century, but after the Second World War, they rose rather more swiftly. Today, the village is a residential community for people in the most varied of occupations, who for the most part must commute to earn a living. In terms of religion, the great majority is Evangelical.

The following table shows population development over the centuries for Frohnhofen, with some figures broken down by religious denomination:

Year	1825	1835	1871	1905	1939	1961	2004
Total	235	250	272	305	472	534	583
Catholic	1					37
Evangelical	234					493
Other	–					4

=== Municipality’s name ===
Frohnhofen’s name refers to a lordly estate (Herrenhof or Fronhof in German) that during the Middle Ages stood somewhere in the middle of the village. The word fron meant “belonging to the lord”. This word element still appears in German in Frondienst (compulsory labour, originally for a lord) and Fronleichnam (literally “dead body belonging to the Lord”, and thus meaning "Corpus Christi"); the word Fron by itself even still exists, although now it is a noun meaning "drudgery". Frohnhofen had its first documented mention in 1387, which called it Frunhoven. Since then, the village has borne the following names, among others: Fronhoff (1437), Fronhoiven (1541), Fronhofen (1564), Fronhoffen (1610).

== Religion ==
"The Kohlbach valley’s religious centre is the venerable parish church which, standing on an hill jutting into the Kohlbach valley, dominates Altenkirchen’s appearance." This one sentence, which appears in Walter Nikolaus’s and Dieter Zenglein’s pictorial history of the Kohlbach valley might well be held to frame the local ecclesiastical history, which largely corresponds with the circumstances in Altenkirchen. From the Middle Ages, Frohnhofen’s inhabitants belonged to the Church of Altenkirchen, and this is also so today. Over many centuries, Frohnhofen’s dead were also buried at the graveyard in Altenkirchen. Only in 1832 did the village get its own graveyard, and in 1988 also a mortuary. In 1556, Elector Palatine Ottheinrich introduced the Reformation according to Martin Luther’s teachings, whereafter Ottheinrich’s successor, Elector Palatine Friedrich III decreed the stricter, Reformed version of Protestantism, Calvinism, as outlined by the 1563 Heidelberg Catechism, and until the end of the Thirty Years' War, under the principle of cuius regio, eius religio, all his subjects had to adopt that faith. Only after the Thirty Years' War ended in 1648 were the people once again allowed to adopt the Catholic or Lutheran faith. With the arrival of new settlers who had come to repopulate villages emptied of people by the Thirty Years' War, and with the promotion of Catholicism by the French during Louis XIV’s wars of conquest, the proportion of Catholics in the local villages’ populations began to rise. While the proportion of Lutherans also grew, their differences with the Calvin Protestant denominations were swept aside with the 1818 Palatine Union, which united the two churches. Even today, the greater part of the population follows the Evangelical faith. Roughly 5% of the population is Catholic. Smaller still is the share of the population who adhere to non-Christian faiths, or none at all.

== Politics ==
=== Municipal council ===
The council is made up of 12 council members, who were elected by proportional representation at the municipal election held on 7 June 2009, and the honorary mayor as chairman.

The municipal election held on 7 June 2009 yielded the following results:

Year	SPD	FWG	Total
2009	5	7	12 seats
2004	5	7	12 seats

“FWG” is a voters’ group.

=== Mayor ===
Frohnhofen’s mayor is Thomas Weyrich, and his deputy is Kurt Weber.

=== Coat of arms ===
The municipality’s arms might be described thus: A fess wavy azure between argent a barn gules with frame sable, and Or dexter a cherry sprig slipped and fructed of two all proper and sinister a hammer and pick per saltire of the fourth.

Dieter Zenglein refers to the barn in his work as a Gutshof ("big farm"). The wavy fess (horizontal stripe) refers to the local brook, the Kohlbach. The charge above this, the barn, refers to the lordly estate that once stood here, and which gave the municipality its name. The cherry sprig on the dexter (armsbearer’s right, viewer’s left) side refers to cherry growing, which is still practised in the municipality today. The hammer and pick on the sinister (armsbearer’s left, viewer’s right) side refer to the formerly great number of miners who lived in the village. The arms have been borne since 1982 when they were approved by the now defunct Rheinhessen-Pfalz Regierungsbezirk administration in Neustadt an der Weinstraße. Frohnhofen also has a municipal flag.

== Culture and sightseeing ==
=== Clubs ===
Frohnhofen has an active and multifaceted club life that to a great extent define the village’s cultural life, particularly the "Oberland" music club. In the newly built community centre and the new fire station, the local clubs have found permanent homes. The "Entenweiher" ("Duckpond") recreational complex, with the cabin of the Pfälzer-Wald-Verein ("Palatine Forest Club"), is enjoyed by anglers and other leisure seekers. The following clubs are active in the municipality:

- Ortsverein Freie Wählergruppe — Free Voters Group local chapter
- Förderverein der Freiwilligen Feuerwehr — fire brigade promotional association
- Musikverein Oberland — music club
- Landfrauenverein — countrywomen’s club
- Obstbauverein — fruitgrowing club
- Sportverein Krottelbach-Frohnhofen — sport club
- SPD – Ortsverein — Social Democratic Party of Germany local chapter
- Angelsportverein — angling club
- Sportschützenverein 3000 — shooting club

The municipality also has a library with about 800 volumes.

=== Regular events ===
Frohnhofen holds a village festival on the first weekend in July, the Jakobskerwe (“Saint James’s Fair”) on the last weekend in July and its kermis (church consecration festival) on the second weekend in October.

=== Sport and leisure ===
At the Entenweiher (“Duckpond”) out towards Sankt Wendel is found the Hütte Am Entenweiher (“Cabin at the Duckpond”), which is very popular among hikers.

=== Natural monuments ===
Frohnhofen has two old trees that are held to be natural monuments: the mighty Wolfsbirnenbaum (“Wolf’s Pear Tree”) on the road to Breitenbach and the Luitpoldlinde (“Luitpold’s Limetree”) at the corner of St. Wendelerstraße and Pfaffeneck.

== Economy and infrastructure ==
=== Economic structure ===
From the time when it first arose as a village, Frohnhofen was laid out for agriculture, although the practice of growing sweet cherries only dates back to the Electorate of the Palatinate times. It may be that there was already a mill standing at the brook in the Middle Ages. Whenever it was built, it was destroyed in the Thirty Years' War and was never restored. Beginning in the 18th century, collieries arose in the outlying countryside around the local villages, where workers from Frohnhofen also found jobs. Even until relatively recent times, there were workers in the village who commuted to jobs at coalmines in the nearby Saarland. Likewise setting up shop in neighbouring villages but not in Frohnhofen itself were the diamond-cutting shops, where workers from Frohnhofen nonetheless sometimes also earned a living. Today, the village is a residential community for people in various lines of work, most of whom must commute elsewhere. There is not much in the way of meaningful job opportunities in Frohnhofen itself. For basic food supplies, Frohnhofen has a grocer’s shop and a branch butcher’s shop. Rounding out the commercial offerings are a cabinetmaker’s shop, two heating system builders and a hairdresser’s. The village also has a postal agency, a library and a children’s playground. At the Entenweiher (“Duckpond”), the Pfälzerwaldverein (a hiking club) maintains a cabin. There are opportunities to expand tourism. Agriculture nowadays plays only a subordinate role in Frohnhofen’s economy.

=== Education ===
In the field of schooling, it was also the central village of Altenkirchen that was at first dominant in the Kohlbach valley; it got its own school in 1716, which schoolchildren from Frohnhofen could also attend. Attempts as early as the 18th century by Frohnhofen to set its own school up did not meet with success. According to details in the Altenkirchen parish register, one of the applicants for a teaching post was supposedly an übergeschnappter Student (the first word means "crazy", "loopy") from Fürth who wore a long, pleated frock coat. By 1802, a teacher named Friedrich Rindt Fuß had been secured, and he stayed for quite a long time, repeatedly being granted a new appointment. School records from 1823 say that the said Mr. Rindt had been named “provisory schoolteacher” for Frohnhofen. This teacher lived and was fed at first in turns at his pupils’ houses, and was also paid one Gulden for each pupil each year, and thus with roughly 50 pupils, he got about 50 Gulden each year. From the year 1835 comes a compilation of his later emoluments: 30 Gulden from the municipal coffers, three cords of wood from the municipal forest and 36 Simmer (or five sevenths of a hectolitre) of grain. Also among the teacher’s benefits were the free use of his service dwelling (built onto the herdsman’s house) worth 8 Gulden, the use of a garden at a scheduled rental price of 7 Gulden and 14 Kreuzer and the use of 1.2 ha of cropland as well as a 0.6 ha meadow, each worth 20 Gulden. Next to the very simple dwelling, room for teaching was brought into being in 1823 at the herdsman’s house. In 1841, a schoolhouse was built on the street now known as Binderstraße with a teacher’s dwelling in accordance with what was laid out at the time by the Kingdom of Bavaria; a belltower was also built on top. It had only one room for sometimes as many as 80 schoolchildren. An "extraordinary visitation" in 1910 complained that there were no spittoon, no wastepaper basket and no handkerchief available, and that the benches were old and therefore unsuitable. In 1912, the livingroom at the front was attacked by dry rot. The walls were painted over with hydrochloric acid (HCl) after the plaster had been stripped off. The floor was torn out and built all over again, with the floorboards having been soaked beforehand in creosote. Only in 1936 did the municipality get a schoolhouse with better premises, on today’s Schulstraße (“School Street”). This building also had a small belltower built on top. In the course of the 1970 school reform in the state of Rhineland-Palatinate, the Frohnhofen school was closed. The primary school pupils now attend school in Altenkirchen, while the Hauptschule students go to the Schönenberg-Kübelberg school centre.

=== Transport ===
Frohnhofen lies on Landesstraße 352, which branches off Bundesstraße 423 near Quirnbach, and leads into the Saarland near Frohnhofen. To the southeast runs the Autobahn A 6 (Saarbrücken–Mannheim), and to the northeast runs the Autobahn A 62 (Kaiserslautern–Trier). The Autobahn interchanges at Glan-Münchweiler and Miesau (or Waldmohr) are each some 15 km away.

Serving nearby Glan-Münchweiler is Glan-Münchweiler station on the Landstuhl–Kusel railway. There are hourly trains at this station throughout the day, namely Regionalbahn service RB 67 between Kaiserslautern and Kusel, named Glantalbahn after a former railway line that shared a stretch of its tracks with the Landstuhl–Kusel railway, including the former junction at Glan-Münchweiler. Others are to be found in Sankt Wendel on the Nahe Valley Railway (Bingen–Saarbrücken) and Homburg on the Mannheim–Saarbrücken railway.
