= Kusel station =

Railway station in Kusel, Germany

Kusel
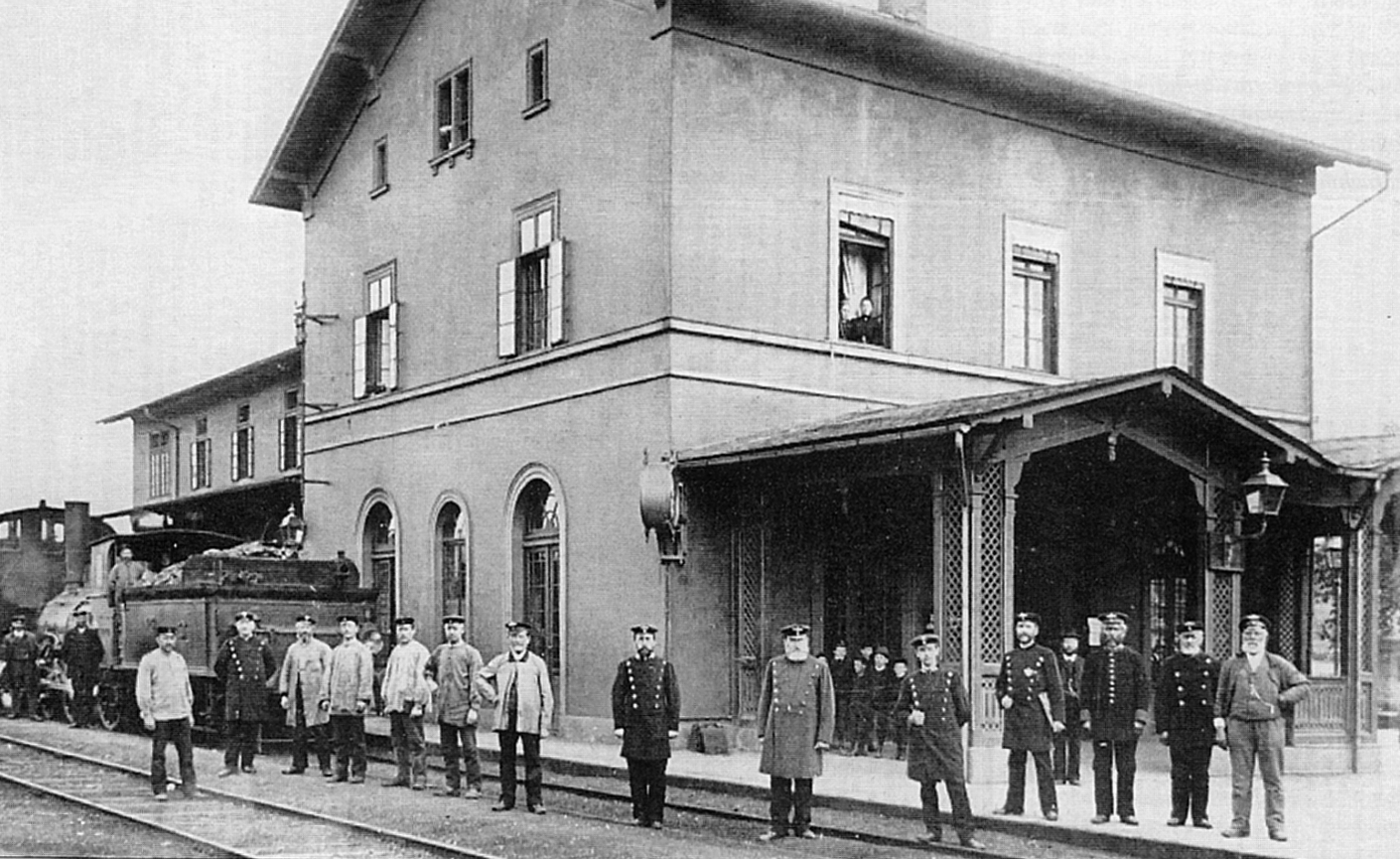
- Kusel station including staff in 1902

General information
- Location: Bahnhofstr. 65, Kusel, Rhineland-Palatinate; Germany
- Coordinates: 49°32′18″N 7°24′37″E
- Lines: Landstuhl–Kusel (4.5) (Note: The line originally had a continuous chainage from Landstuhl. The station was therefore at 28.7 km. With the opening of the Glan Valley Railway a new chainage was introduced starting in the west at Scheidt on the Mannheim–Saarbrücken railway, which ran via Glan Munchweiler and Altenglan to Bad Münster. The chainage from Landstuhl has since ended at Glan-Munchweiler. Chainage on the Altenglan-Kusel section has since started at 0.0 km.); Türkismühle–Kusel (32.6 km) (closed)
- Platforms: 2

Construction
- Accessible: Yes

Other information
- Station code: 3476
- DS100 code: SKUS
- IBNR: 8003481
- Category: 6
- Fare zone: VRN: 780
- Website: www.bahnhof.de

History
- Opened: 22 September 1868

Services
Preceding station	DB Regio Mitte	Following station
Terminus	RB 67	Rammelsbach towards Kaiserslautern Hbf
Location

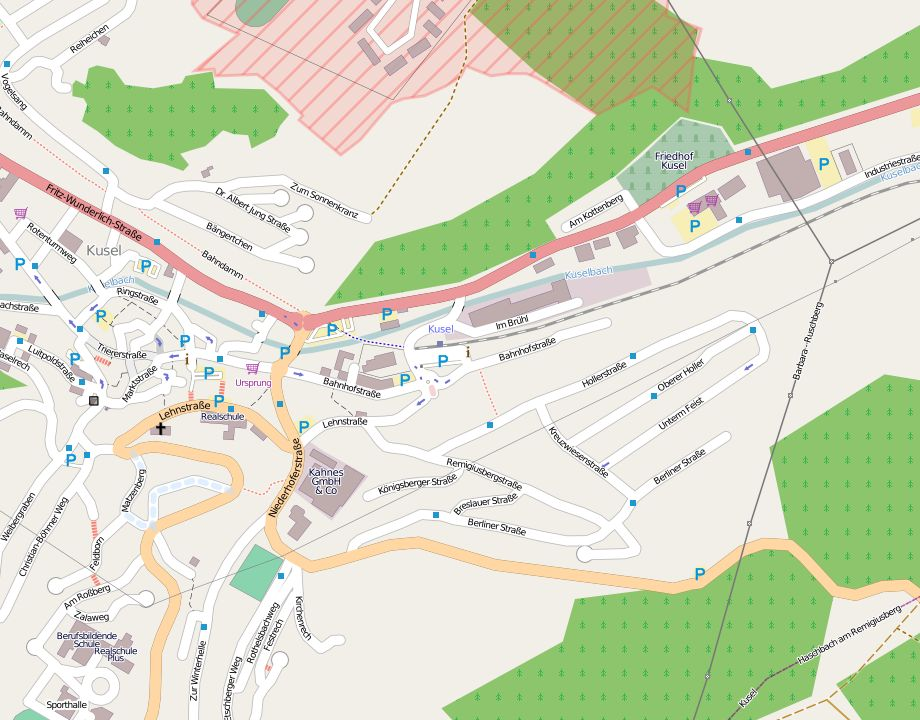
Location of Kusel station

Kusel station is the station of the town of Kusel in the German state of Rhineland-Palatinate. It was opened on 22 September 1868 as the terminus of the Landstuhl–Kusel railway. It is classified by Deutsche Bahn as a category 6 station. The station is located in the network area of the Verkehrsverbund Rhein-Neckar (Rhine-Neckar Transport Association, VRN). The address of the station is Bahnhofstraße 65.

With the completion of the Türkismühle–Kusel railway in November 1936, it became a through station. After the local through traffic had disappeared in the 1950s, the section between Kusel and Schwarzerden was shut down in 1970 and subsequently dismantled, making Kusel station a terminus again.

== Location ==
The station is located on the eastern approach to the city. In the immediate vicinity there is a department store and the silo of a rural credit union (Raiffeisen). It has a public telephone, a parking area, a bus stop and a barrier-free entrance.

=== Railways ===
The Kusel–Landstuhl railway comes from the east and follows the Kuselbach (brook) from Altenglan. From the Rammelsbach station it rises at a gradient of 1:133. From 1936 to 1970, it continued directly on to the link to Türkismühle, but through passenger services ended in 1951. The former line crossed the Kuselbach (brook) immediately after leaving the station and proceeded along its left (north) bank.

== History ==
The first attempts to have a railway built through the western North Palatine Uplands towards Kusel go back to 1856. During the construction of the Rhine-Nahe Railway (Rhein-Nahe Eisenbahn), a route was proposed by the Bavarian Palatinate, which would have run from near Boos on the Nahe along the Glan via Lauterecken and Altenglan, then along the Kuselbach via the small town of Kusel to Sankt Wendel or along the Oster to Neunkirchen. The argument for this option was based on the fact that it would have been shorter and cheaper than a line along the Nahe. For tactical reasons, Prussia initially pretended to be receptive to these plans, as at the same the Grand Duchy of Oldenburg blocked the route proposed through its exclave of Birkenfeld. Oldenburg finally gave in and accepted the line as originally proposed by Prussia. Moreover, the latter benefitted as a line along the Nahe would run mainly within its own territory.

The Ludwigshafen–Bexbach line completed by the Palatine Ludwig Railway Company (Pfälzische Ludwigsbahn-Gesellschaft) in 1849 and the Rhine-Nahe Railway completed from Bingerbrück to Neunkirchen in 1860 touched the extreme northern or southern borders of the North Palatine Uplands, in which Kusel is located. Both lines competed with each other. This became clear from the fact that Prussia built a road from Heimbach station on the Nahe Valley Railway to Kusel, to redirect traffic that had previously been aligned towards the Palatine Ludwig Railway to its territory. Initially Heimbach station's only purpose was to connect to Kusel.

=== Planning and construction of the Kusel–Landstuhl railway ===
According to a memorandum published in Kusel in 1861, the railway would branch from the Palatine Ludwig Railway in Landstuhl and run through the Mohrbach, Glan and Kuselbach valleys to Kusel. In the memorandum, it was argued that, among other things, the railway construction would improve the rather poor economic and social conditions of the region. Previously, all communities between the two cities had expressed support for such a railway. Another argument was that there were numerous stone deposits on the route, which had been used in Paris among other places.

The construction of the 28.7 km stretch from Landstuhl to Kusel was largely uncomplicated. Cuttings were only necessary in the country around Rammelsbach, where the work force encountered a diorite deposit, which was mined in the following years and gave an additional impetus to rail transport. The Rammelsbach Tunnel was the largest building project along the line. Construction on the section between Glan-Münchweiler and Kusel was delayed because not enough workers could be recruited. The first freight train ran on 28 August 1868.

=== Opening and subsequent history ===
The Kusel–Landstuhl line was officially opened on 20 September 1868. On this day, a special train also ran from Ludwigshafen to Kusel, which carried, apart from officials of the Palatinate Railway (Pfalzbahn), the former Bavarian Minister of State for Trade and Public Works, Gustav Schlör. The new line was very well received by the population, as it improved the infrastructure of the rural region northwest of Kaiserslautern. Two days later, the line was released for regular traffic. The line gave an economic impetus to the town of Kusel, in particular.

=== Creation of the link from Türkismühle ===
Already in the 1860s a railway committee of Trier had promoted a connection from Trier via Hermeskeil and Kusel to Landstuhl. The aim was a better railway connection between western and southern Germany. These efforts were unsuccessful, as only railway built on this route was the line from Landstuhl to Kusel. Another committee, which was established in the 1890s for the closing of the gap between Kusel and Türkismühle, also failed. In the subsequent period a committee was established with plans for a railway line from Heimbach via Baumholder to Kusel and this was supported by petitions from several communities such as Kusel and Freisen. In 1910, another committee was founded for a line from Türkismühle to Kusel, which suggested two different routes: one would run from Oberkirchen (now in the municipality of Freisen) to Türkismühle and another from Kusel via Oberkirchen to Sankt Wendel.

After Germany's defeat in the First World War the Saar territory was separated from Germany, the district of Restkreis St. Wendel-Baumholder (the “rest” of the Sankt Wendel district that had not been absorbed into the Allied-controlled Saar), in particular, championed the railway line, as the Saar was no longer part of the German economic territory as a result of the customs border. In 1927, both public authorities and economic and community organisations were active in the foundation of the Association for the Advancement of the Construction of the Türkismühle-Kusel Railway (Vereinigung zur Förderung des Bahnbaues Türkismühle–Kusel). On 31 March 1931, the project was included in the so-called "frontier program," even though at first it was not clear whether in this context, a railway or a road connection would result. On 7 October of that year, the Ministry of Transport approved a rail link. In addition, the construction would counteract the increasing unemployment. To finance this, the government made a loan to Deutsche Reichsbahn. During the course of the building, Kusel station had to be fundamentally redesigned. In particular, since the line being built continuously lost height from Diedelkopf, it achieved the level of line from Landstuhl only in the eastern part of the station. The section from Kusel to Diedelkopf was completed on 15 May 1936 and the line was opened to traffic along its entire length on 16 November 1936.

=== World War II and Deutsche Bundesbahn (1941–1993) ===
Since during the Second World War, the timetable could often not be met, a directory of “essential trains" was published on 5 May 1941. This included at least four trains per day between Kusel and Türkismühle, at least three trains between Kusel and Ottweiler and two between Altenglan and Kusel in each direction.

On 6 January 1945, Kusel became the target for an air raid which was aimed at munitions that were suspected to be stationed at the station, but which had already left.

On 20 May 1951, passenger services were discontinued temporarily between Kusel and Schwarzerden. In 1958, passenger services resumed towards Schwarzerden, but they were finally closed in 1964 and freight traffic ended two years later. A flood of the Kuselbach on 5 December 1965 closed operations between Altenglan and Kusel that evening and on the following day. The connection to Schwarzerden was closed permanently in 1970 and it was dismantled from 25 January 1971. Since then, Kusel has been a terminus again.

=== Deutsche Bahn (since 1994) ===
In January 2000, V 100 diesel locomotives, which hauled some of the traffic from the 1960s to the late 1980s, were returned to service for a few months. The reason for this was that the class 218 locomotives that had taken over haulage ran their engines during the winter to provide heating to the carriages, producing what a citizen of Kusel who lived near the station considered to be noise pollution. Since he had complained to the police, the V 100 was temporarily reactivated because its engines were quieter.

In the same year, the station, like the entire Western and Anterior Palatinate, became part of the newly established Western Palatinate Transport Association (Westpfalz-Verkehrsverbundes, WVV), until it was absorbed six years later into the Verkehrsverbund Rhein-Neckar (Rhine-Neckar Transport Association, VRN). Passenger operations on the Landstuhl line were operated from that time by trans regio until the end of 2008.

In 2007, the platforms were rebuilt to make them accessible for the disabled and in this context the tracks were moved and the island and outer platforms were replaced by a so-called "combined platform". Several sets of points that were no longer needed were removed. The reconstruction costs amounted to €650,000. Subsequently, the operational concession was tendered again and, as a result, DB Regio, took over operations at the end of 2008 until at least 2023.

A mobility centre called Pfälzer Bergland – hin und weg (Palatine Uplands – there and away) was opened at the station on 8 June 2011; it also acts as a tourist information office at the same time. It operates at the office of the Saar-Pfalz-Bus GmbH, the bus line that call at the station.

== Buildings ==
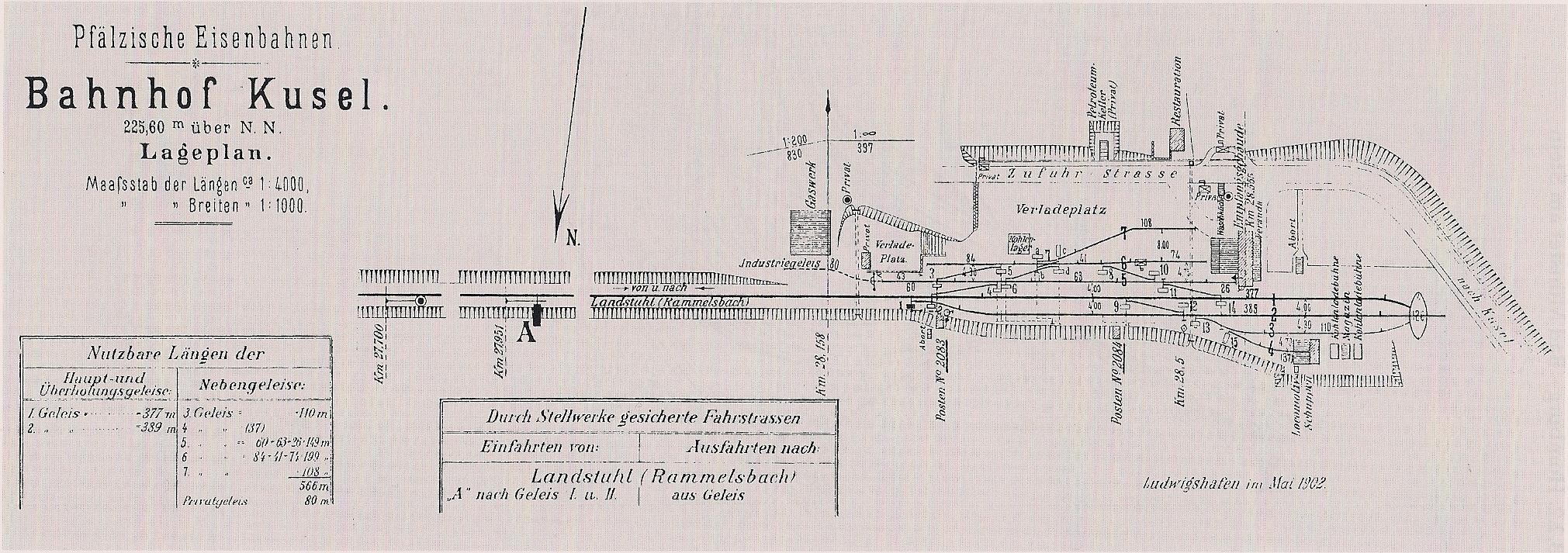
Track plan of 1902

The entrance station at its opening was built in the style of the other Palatine stations that were built in the 1860s and 1870s, inspired and equipped accordingly with external plasterwork. In accordance with the importance of the station it has a relatively large gable facing the tracks and the street. It has two and a half floors that were originally equipped with staff accommodation and administrative offices. Directly next to it there was a two-storey goods shed, which was created with the sloped part of the roof facing the station. Both the station and the goods shed experienced some structural changes and the latter was also expanded in the coming decades. There was a wooden porch at the western end of the station building. The station building is no longer used for rail operations.

=== Turntable ===
As part of its opening, the station received a turntable with a diameter of 10.5 metres. In 1888, extra tracks were added and the diameter of the turntable was extended to 12 m. After the opening of the line to Türkismühle, the turntable was rebuilt with a diameter of 16 m, but it had already disappeared by the 1950s.

=== Platforms ===
Platforms
Track	Usable length	Platform height	Current user
1	130 m	55 cm	Regionalbahn services towards Landstuhl
2	130 m	55 cm	Regionalbahn services towards Landstuhl

== Operations ==
=== Passengers ===
From the opening of the Kusel–Landstuhl line, it operated with two mixed and two ordinary passenger trains. Thus, a train shuttled four times between Landstuhl and Kusel each day. The last train to Kusel remained overnight. It was not until 1900, the services began to be extended gradually. After the opening of the Glan Valley Railway (Glantalbahn) in 1904 over its full length, services were established that ran from Glan–Munchweiler to Altenglan and over the Kusel line; other services ran between Altenglan and Kusel. A few years later services ran between Homburg and Kusel, which mainly served miners commuting from the region around Kusel to the Saar region. With the separation of the current Saarland from Germany after the Second World War, access to the Saarland was prohibited for the common people.

In 1905, a total of 32,091 tickets was sold at the station; in 1934, 52,194 were sold. Train services steadily increased to the end of the 1930s.

In early 1936, traffic ran west for less than a year to terminate in Diedelkopf; then the entire line to Türkismühle was taken into operation. After 1938, when the Oster Valley Railway (Ostertalbahn), which branched off in Schwarzerden, was opened over its full length, there were continuous services from Kusel on this line to Neunkirchen, which also mainly served miners commuting from the region around Kusel to the Saar region.

Although the railway from Türkismühle ran directly through Kusel station towards Altenglan, there were with a few exceptions, no through trains, so that normally passengers had to change in Kusel. There was, for example, one continuous connection from Türkismühle to Altenglan in 1937. Especially in the 1930s, the timetable included several routes that operated over sections of different lines, such as the Kaiserslautern–Lauterecken-Grumbach–Altenglan–Kusel route. Since the 1950s, there has been always at least ten pairs of trains each day between Landstuhl and Kusel. From the early 1950s, a so-called Städteschnellzug ("city express", a supplement-free express train) ran between Kusel and Heidelberg. In 1954, it was downgraded to a semi-fast train (Eilzug). It was discontinued in 1979.

Since 2006, the station is served hourly by the Glantalbahn (Regionalbahn 67) in the fare system of the VRN.

Rail services in 2013 timetable
Train class	Route	Frequency
RB 67	Kaiserslautern – Landstuhl – Glan-Münchweiler – Altenglan – Kusel	Hourly

=== Freight ===
Kusel station owed its importance to freight transport, especially for the local industry and the Unteroffizier-Krüger Barracks. Sometimes it served troop trains to the neighbouring Baumholder military training area. In 1905, it received or dispatched a total of 35,495.11 tons of freight. The station mainly received bricks, limestone, malt, flour, iron and other fertilizers, cement, gypsum and lime. It shipped mainly wire and wire nails, cereal and beer.

In 1920, a local freight train (Nahgüterzug) ran from Kaiserslautern to Kusel and another ran between Altenglan and Kusel. A through freight train (Durchgangsgüterzug) ran from Kaiserslautern to Kusel. After the Second World War, revenue declined steadily. Until the mid-1960s, the stations of Thallichtenberg and Pfeffelbach along the line to Türkismühle were served by a freight exchange train (Übergabegüterzug) from Kusel. In the 1990s, it was served only by a freight exchange train between Kaiserslautern-Einsiedlerhof station on the Mannheim–Saarbrücken line and Kusel. Now, the station has no freight operations and its freight tracks have been dismantled.

=== Buses ===
Next to the so-called "combined platform" there is a bus stop. It is served by the following bus routes:

- 270 (Kusel–Rammelsbach–Altenglan-Patersbach-Bedesbach–Erdesbach–Ulmet–Rathsweiler–Niederalben–Eschenau–Sankt Julian–Glanbrücken–Offenbach am Glan–Wiesweiler–Lauterecken),
- 271 (Kusel–Rammelsbach–Altenglan–Patersbach–Erdesbach–Ulmet–Rathsweiler–Niederalben–Eschenau–Sankt Julian–Gumbsweiler–Glanbrücken–Offenbach am Glan–Wiesweiler–Lauterecken),
- 274 (Kusel–Rammelsbach–Altenglan–Welchweiler–Elzweiler–Horschbach–Hinzweiler–Rothselberg/Wolfstein)
- 275 (Kusel–Rammelsbach–Altenglan–Friedelhausen–Bosenbach–Niederstaufenbach–Eßweiler/Jettenbach (Pfalz)–Rothselberg–Kreimbach-Kaulbach–Olsbrücken/Rutsweiler an der Lauter–Roßbach (Pfalz)–Wolfstein
- 276 (Kusel–Rammelsbach–Altenglan–Mühlbach am Glan–Rutsweiler am Glan–Theisbergstegen–Gimsbach–Haschbach am Remigiusberg–Kusel)
- 280 (Kusel–Diedelkopf–Bledesbach–Konken–Herschweiler-Pettersheim–Ohmbach–Brücken (Pfalz)–Schönenberg-Kübelberg–Waldmohr–Homburg)
- 288 (Kusel–Diedelkopf–Bledesbach–Konken–Langenbach (Pfalz)–Herschweiler-Pettersheim–Krottelbach–Frohnhofen–Altenkirchen (Pfalz)–Paulengrund–Schönenberg-Kübelberg–Waldmohr–Homburg)
- 292 (Kusel–Diedelkopf–Ruthweiler–Thallichtenberg–Baumholder/Pfeffelbach–Reichweiler–Schwarzerden–Oberkirchen–Freisen
- 295 Stadtverkehr Kusel

All lines are operated by Saar-Pfalz-Bus GmbH, a subsidiary of DB.

== Sources ==
- Hans-Joachim Emich, Rolf Becker (1996). Die Eisenbahnen an Glan und Lauter (in German). Waldmohr: Self-published. ISBN 3-9804919-0-0.
- Heinz Sturm (2005). Die pfälzischen Eisenbahnen (in German). Ludwigshafen am Rhein: pro MESSAGE. ISBN 3-934845-26-6.
