= Krottelbach =

- Municipality
- Coat of arms

- Location of Krottelbach within Kusel district
- Interactive map of Krottelbach
- Location within Germany Location within Rhineland-Palatinate
- Coordinates: 49°28′6″N 7°19′53″E
- Country: Germany
- State: Rhineland-Palatinate
- District: Kusel
- Municipal assoc.: Oberes Glantal

Government
  - Mayor (2019–24): Karlheinz Finkbohner

Area
  - Total: 5.56 km^{2} (2.15 sq mi)
- Elevation: 260 m (850 ft)

Population (2025-12-31)
  - Total: 613
  - Density: 110/km^{2} (286/sq mi)
- Time zone: UTC+01:00 (CET)
  - Summer (DST): UTC+02:00 (CEST)
- Postal codes: 66909
- Dialling codes: 06386
- Vehicle registration: KUS
- Website: www.krottelbach.de

Krottelbach is an Ortsgemeinde – a municipality belonging to a Verbandsgemeinde, a kind of collective municipality – in the Kusel district in Rhineland-Palatinate, Germany. It belongs to the Verbandsgemeinde of Oberes Glantal.

== Geography ==
=== Location ===
The municipality lies in the Western Palatinate near the state boundary with the Saarland. Krottelbach lies on the upper reaches of its namesake brook, the Krottelbach, which rises in the woods west of the village. Several tributary brooks flow from side valleys, forming a radial pattern and emptying into the Krottelbach within the municipality. Almost all these surrounding side valleys are settled, giving the village a somewhat star-shaped built-up area. The lowest houses in Krottelbach stand roughly 270 m above sea level, whereas higher locations reach 280 m. The valley slopes are steep, and in the west reach an elevation of 445 m above sea level at the Kaiserberg. This wooded area with the Hoher Fels (“High Crag”) and the hiker's cabin belonging to the Pfälzerwaldverein (a hiking club) is said to be a popular hiking area. The municipal area measures 555 ha, of which 161 ha is wooded.

=== Neighbouring municipalities ===
Krottelbach borders in the north and east on the municipality of Herschweiler-Pettersheim, in the southeast on the municipality of Ohmbach, in the southwest on the municipality of Frohnhofen, in the west on the town of Sankt Wendel (Saarland) and in the northwest on the municipality of Langenbach. Krottelbach also meets the municipality of Altenkirchen at a single point in the south.

=== Municipality’s layout ===
Anyone reaching Krottelbach from upstream, to the east, finds himself going along the main through street, called Hauptstraße (“Main Street”). In the village centre, Hauptstraße turns towards the south into the Kahlmer Graben. From the village centre with its Hauptstraße and Ringstraße, a whole series of other roads branches off: Friedhofstraße (“Graveyard Road”), Rödelsbachstraße, Straße “Zum hohen Fels” (“Road to the High Crag”), Flurstraße, Maiwaldstraße, Hirtenweg and Bubacher Straße. The hiker's cabin is found in the western wooded area on the extension of Straße “Zum hohen Fels”, while on the extension of Maiwaldstraße is found the sporting ground.

== History ==
=== Antiquity ===
The local area was settled in prehistoric times, as witnessed by the many barrows, mainly in neighbouring municipalities. This is also true of the Gallo-Roman epoch, which also left its traces behind. An extensive Gallo-Roman settlement spread out just across the state boundary in the Heidenbösch in Bubach, an outlying centre of the town of Sankt Wendel.

=== Middle Ages ===
Krottelbach lay in the so-called Remigiusland around Kusel. This statement, however, is subject to certain qualifications. When the Remigiusland was donated by a Frankish king in the 5th century to the Bishopric of Reims, the churches in Osterna (Niederkirchen, now an outlying centre of Sankt Wendel) and Ouenbach (Ohmbach) with Krottelbach did not belong to it. Rather, these two parishes remained first Imperial domain and only later, at an unknown time, were they given by a Frankish king as a donation to the Archbishopric of Mainz. In 976, Archbishop of Mainz Willigis (975-1011) brought about the refounding of the Disibodenberg Monastery, which then stood as the hub of archiepiscopal holdings in the lands on the Rhine’s left bank. To bring home this monastery's special status, Willigis bequeathed it extensive holdings in the surrounding area, among them the two parishes mentioned above, which were transferred out of the bishopric's belongings. The original document listing these bequests has not survived. The contents are known, however, from documents issued by Archbishops Ruthard (1108) and Adalbert (1128). That Osterna and Ohmbach were later still counted as part of the Remigiusland may have owed itself to further historical development. In 1127, Count Gerlach I from the Nahegau founded the County of Veldenz and became Schutzvogt (a lay church official charged with looking after church properties) over various ecclesiastical lordly domains of Mainz, Worms, Verdun and Reims. The result was that the Remigiusland around Kusel and the domains held by the Archbishopric of Mainz in the Ostertal (valley) and on the Ohmbach (river), which lay right next to it, were jointly administered. Thus, no longer was there any distinction between the actual Remigiusland and the domains held by the Archbishopric of Mainz. Moreover, in the late 12th century, the Disibodenberg Monastery began to decline, leading by the mid 13th century to the Benedictine convent's dissolution. The monastery's holdings in the Ostertal and on the Ohmbach were sold to the Counts of Veldenz. Ohmbach, along with the other places in the parish thus passed in 1256 into Count Gerlach V's ownership; he later bequeathed the two parishes in his will to the Werschweiler Monastery in 1258. This bequest was soon fulfilled: After taking part in a delegation to Spain, which offered King Alfonso X of Castile the German crown, Gerlach died, possibly in 1259, and the two parishes found their way into the Monastery's hands (some accounts falsely state that Gerlach did not even make it back from Spain). Less than 200 years later, the Werschweiler Monastery was dissolved in the Reformation, and the holding passed to the Counts Palatine of Zweibrücken, whose rule had begun in 1444. Within these none too fathomable development phases arose Krottelbach, but only during the 14th century, according to author Fritz Kleinschmidt's theory, at the forks of the various brooks, and as a branch settlement of the Cheiz Estate, and thus after Count Gerlach V's 1258 bequest. The village's name appears for the first time in a 1355 boundary description, in which the Imperial domain's original boundary was transcribed. The relevant part reads:

…weiter durch das Dorf Ohmbach hinauf bis zu dem Steine, an dem sich die Krottelbacher und die Altenkirchener Hube scheiden…
(…farther through the village of Ohmbach up to the stone at which the Krottelbach and Altenkirchen Huben are divided from each other…)

=== Modern times ===
Krottelbach shared history in early modern times with the Duchy of Palatinate-Zweibrücken up until it was brought to an end by the French Revolution. In 1575, a man named Hans Müller zu Croftelbach (that is, Krottelbach), was named as the Schultheiß in Pettersheim. He is the forefather of several houses of Schultheißen. At this time, the Krottelbach formed the boundary between the parishes of Ohmbach and Konken. This has caused some difficulty in ascertaining what the village's population was then, for in the so-called Konker Protokollen, the 12 hearths (for this, read “households”) with 65 inhabitants listed for Krottelbach were actually only the ones on the north side of the brook, in the parish of Konken. Corresponding statistics for the part of the village on the south bank are not available. All in all, though, the village as a whole may have been rather big for the circumstances of that time. Like all villages in the region around Kusel, Krottelbach suffered heavily under the twin blows of the Plague and the Thirty Years' War. After that war, there were for a while only four people living in the village. The Schultheiß family, too, survived; they had sought refuge during the onslaught at Castle Lichtenberg. In the years after the war, these families brought the greater part of the land under their ownership. There were newcomers, too, but more people died towards the end of the 17th century in French King Louis XIV’s wars of conquest. Only in the 18th century did the population steadily rise.

==== Recent times ====
The French Revolution put an end to the Duchy of Palatinate-Zweibrücken. France annexed the German lands on the Rhine’s left bank. Krottelbach now found itself in the Mairie (“Mayoralty”) of Konken, the Canton of Kusel, the Arrondissement of Birkenfeld and the Department of Sarre. After Napoleonic times, beginning in 1816, Krottelbach was in Bavaria's Rheinkreis in the Landkommissariat (later Bezirksamt; later still district) of Kusel and the canton of Kusel, as well as the Bürgermeisterei (“Mayoralty”) of Konken. This administrative structure was to last up to administrative and territorial reform in 1968. Since 1972, Krottelbach has belonged as a self-administering Ortsgemeinde to the Verbandsgemeinde of Glan-Münchweiler. Towards the end of Weimar times, the Nazis’ popularity grew steadily. Indeed, the last row in this table of Reichstag election results shows results for an election after Adolf Hitler seized power. Even though local support for the Nazis had swollen to 44.3% of the local vote, the Nazis were apparently still not quite as popular locally as the Communists (KPD). By the following year, though, the Nazis had dispensed with elections and banned their archrival, the Communist Party of Germany. Hitler's success in these elections had thereby paved the way for his Enabling Act of 1933 (Ermächtigungsgesetz), thus starting the Third Reich in earnest.

Year	SPD	KPD	DVP	NSDAP	Bauern
1924 (May)	37.9	15.4	54.6	—	—
1928 (May)	15.0	49.2	2.1	4.8	25.7
1930 (September)	10.3	19.5	1.1	35.1	3.8
1933 (March)	3.6	45.7	—	44.3	—

=== Population development ===
Krottelbach was until not at all very long ago still characterized by agriculture, but even in the 19th century, workers held a great share of the population, which later grew. In the time after the First World War, the number of workers, most of whom were known as Saargänger – “Saar-goers”, from their commuting habits – became more than half Krottelbach's workforce. This trend kept growing until after the Second World War. Today, farming plays a rather subordinate part in the village's economy. The village is today strictly a residential community. Jobs are today sought mainly in the Saarland, Kaiserslautern and Kusel.

The following table shows population development over the centuries for Krottelbach, with some figures broken down by religious denomination:

Year	1609	1825	1835	1871	1905	1939	1961	2003	2008
Total	65	287	327	394	428	574	779	800	759
Catholic							36		106
Evangelical							734		524
Other or None							9		101

=== Municipality’s name ===
Krottelbach's name is taken to mean the settlement on the like-named brook, which goes back to the Germanic word Kruftala, and from the beginning has meant “Toadbrook” (this would be Krötenbach in German). Nevertheless, writer Ernst Christmann tried to trace the name back to a crypt (Gruft in German) or a cave (Höhle). In the 1355 document that first mentions Krottelbach, the village is called Crofftelbach, in which the Germanic root can still clearly be recognized, whereas in the centuries that followed, the double F disappeared. In 1458, the name appeared as Kroftelbach and at the same time Krotelbach. Later, other forms cropped up, among others: Crafftelbach (1505), Krottelbach (1565 and 1824) and Grottelbach (1731).

=== Vanished villages ===
In the Krottelbach area once lay two other villages, Bontweiler and Reisweiler, which vanished in the Middle Ages. Bontweiler was mentioned in 1460 as Bontwillr and again in 1462 as Bontweiler in the Remigiusberg Monastery's taxation rolls. The name refers to a settler named Bondo (Weiler means “hamlet” in German, or originally, “homestead”). The name nowadays only appears in rural cadastral names (Bodweilerweg, Bodenweiler Garten). Reisweiler was obviously of greater importance. Its name refers to another settler named Riso. In 1292, a man named Baldemarus von Resvilre was mentioned, a lesser nobleman. All that remained of the village's name up until the 19th century, after the village was forsaken – which happened even before the Thirty Years' War – was the name Reisweiler Mühle, a mill on the Ohmbach within Krottelbach's limits, now known as the Reismühle. In a few reports, an estate called Cheiz, which was mentioned in 1238 in a document from the Wörschweiler Monastery, is named as the origin of the village of Krottelbach. By this theory, the name Kaiserberg (mountain) also goes back to this estate. The name appears in a 1233 document from the Werschweiler Monastery, according to which a Count Heinrich von Castel and his wife Agnese transferred their estate of Cheiz near Ovenbach (Ohmbach) to the Werschweiler Monastery.

== Religion ==
Krottelbach belonged from its founding to the village church in Ohmbach, which Count Gerlach V of Veldenz had bequeathed to the Werschweiler Monastery after 1258. During the Reformation, the monastery was dissolved, whereafter some of the now Lutheran villagers still belonged to the parish of Ohmbach, while others belonged to the parish of Konken. In 1588, on Count Palatine Johannes I's orders, the villagers converted to John Calvin’s Reformed teachings. After the Thirty Years’ War, there was supposedly freedom of religion, but on into the 19th century, the inhabitants of Krottelbach remained solidly Reformed, a faith that united with the Lutherans in 1817 in the Protestant Union. Meanwhile, the whole village once again belonged to the parish of Ohmbach. In 1954, the new parish of Herschweiler-Pettersheim was founded within the Deaconry of Kusel, and grouped into this were also Ohmbach, Krottelbach and Langenbach. The village's Catholic minority nowadays belongs to the church at Brücken. There are also small numbers of people in Krottelbach who are adherents of other faiths, or profess none.

== Politics ==
=== Municipal council ===
The council is made up of 12 council members, who were elected by proportional representation at the municipal election held on 7 June 2009, and the honorary mayor as chairman.

The municipal election held on 7 June 2009 yielded the following results:

Year	SPD	WGr	GFK	Total
2009	2	5	5	12 seats

“WGr” and “GFK” are voters’ groups.

=== Mayor ===
Krottelbach's mayor is Karlheinz Finkbohner (SPD), and his deputies are Thomas Schramm (GFK) and Thomas Schneider (GFK).

=== Coat of arms ===
The municipality's arms might be described thus: Argent on ground vert an ox passant guardant gules horned and unguled Or.

The charge in these arms, the ox, is drawn from a former municipal seal. The same arms were once borne by the formerly West Prussian municipality of Schönlanke (now Trzcianka in northwest Poland, whose arms are still similar). The arms have been borne since 1969 when they were approved by the now defunct Rheinhessen-Pfalz Regierungsbezirk administration in Neustadt an der Weinstraße.

== Culture and sightseeing ==
=== Buildings ===
The following are listed buildings or sites in Rhineland-Palatinate’s Directory of Cultural Monuments:

- Friedhofstraße 7 – Quereinhaus (a combination residential and commercial house divided for these two purposes down the middle, perpendicularly to the street), essentially from the 18th century, separate vaulted cellar

=== Regular events ===
- Kappensitzungen – stage shows held at Carnival (known locally as Fasching) on the two Saturdays before Shrove Tuesday and Ash Wednesday at the sport club house
- Rosenmontagsumzug – a Carnival parade on Shrove Monday
- Feuerwehrfest – fire brigade festival
- Dorffest – village festival held on the third weekend in August
- Kermis – church consecration festival, locally known as the Kerwe, held on the last weekend in October
- Martinsumzug – a parade
- Sportfest

=== Sport and leisure ===
In the nearby woods are seven marked hiking trails.

=== Clubs ===
Krottelbach has the following clubs:

- Sportverein Krottelbach-Frohnhofen – sport club
- Pfälzerwaldverein – hiking club
- Gesangverein – singing club
- Obst- und Gartenbauverein – fruitgrowing and gardening club

== Economy and infrastructure ==
=== Economic structure ===
Agriculture, which dominated Krottelbach's economic life well into the 20th century, is today not as important. Likewise, the woodlands with their romantic corners are nowadays prized more for their recreational value than their economic value in forestry. Moreover, there are development opportunities in tourism. In the village itself is a clothing shop, frequented not only by villagers but by many customers from elsewhere. Most members of the workforce must commute elsewhere to their jobs, to Kusel, Kaiserslautern or the Saarland. Krottelbach is otherwise said to be a quiet little residential community for people of the most varied of occupations. Krottelbach has a village community centre, and also a hiking clubhouse called Zum Hohen Fels (“At the High Crag”). This stands somewhat outside the village in the woods and is connected to the hiking trails.

=== Education ===
From the 16th and 17th centuries, no information about schooling in Krottelbach is available. In 1827, municipal council attended to plans to establish the village's own school and to build a schoolhouse in the village. As recompense, the schoolteacher was to be paid 50 Rhenish guilders, one barrel of corn, 1 Rhenish guilder in school fees from each schoolchild, the use of the staff dwelling, and three cords of wood. In 1829, Ludwig Theis from Erdesbach successfully applied for a teaching post (municipal council: Assistant Zimmer, Theobald Becker, Peter Wagner, Elias Zimmer, Peter Mootz, Jakob Hesel, Peter Schneider, Peter Schöpper). In 1838, the schoolteacher's recompense was set at 186 Rhenish guilders with consideration of all usage rights. After Theiß was at first always praised for his hard work and unimpeachable moral conduct, later there were criticisms to the effect that he was using more farmland than he was entitled to by the list of usage rights. The couple of Morgen that he was working, though, amounted to woodland of questionable quality that hardly yielded bountiful crops. In 1864, Friedrich Göttel (or Goeddel) from Konken came to Krottelbach as the schoolteacher. His time in the teaching post may well have served as a good example of how the authorities at that time treated a sick teacher. It was not long after he was hired that he caught tuberculosis, but the authorities were loth to acknowledge the teacher's illness. He was sent several times to a health resort for his “bad heart”, each time being made to pay for part of it himself, but always came back to stand before his class once again. It is therefore clear that the doctors who treated him – and sent him back – knew full well that he was actually suffering from tuberculosis, which could then not be cured. So, these were their recommendations: “The teacher should, while coughing, keep at least one meter away from the pupils and always hold a handkerchief or a hand before his mouth. The sputum may under no circumstances be voided onto the floor, and for this the teacher should for his own personal use avail himself of a spittoon …”. Göttel had to teach thus for yet another year before he no longer had the strength to do the job, and was accordingly given an early retirement. In the time that followed, there was a very high teacher turnover. The one-room schoolhouse was closed in the course of school reform, about 1970. Today, both primary school pupils and Hauptschule students attend their respective schools in Herschweiler-Pettersheim.

=== Transport ===
Krottelbach lies on Landesstraße 352, which branches off Landesstraße 350 near Herschweiler-Pettersheim and links with Bundesstraße 420 between Altenkirchen and Frohnhofen. Within the village itself, Kreisstraße 11 branches off Landesstraße 352 and leads through the woodlands west of the village to the boundary with the Saarland, and onwards to the neighbouring village of Bubach. To the northeast runs the Autobahn A 62 (Kaiserslautern–Trier). The interchanges at Kusel and Glan-Münchweiler are each roughly 10 km away. Only slightly farther away is the Waldmohr interchange on Autobahn A 60. The nearest station is Glan-Münchweiler station, which is on the Landstuhl–Kusel railway and is served by Regionalbahn service RB 67, called the Glantalbahn (the name of which refers to the Glan Valley Railway, which shared some of the route of the Landstuhl–Kusel line, including the former junction at Glan-Münchweiler). There are other stations in Kusel, Landstuhl and Homburg.
