= Altenkirchen, Kusel =

Altenkirchen
- Municipality
- Coat of arms

- Location of Altenkirchen within Kusel district
- Interactive map of Altenkirchen
- Location within Germany Location within Rhineland-Palatinate
- Coordinates: 49°26′32″N 7°19′13″E
- Country: Germany
- State: Rhineland-Palatinate
- District: Kusel
- Municipal assoc.: Oberes Glantal

Government
  - Mayor (2019–24): Manfred Geis

Area
  - Total: 6.44 km^{2} (2.49 sq mi)
- Elevation: 297 m (974 ft)

Population (2025-12-31)
  - Total: 1,281
  - Density: 199/km^{2} (515/sq mi)
- Time zone: UTC+01:00 (CET)
  - Summer (DST): UTC+02:00 (CEST)
- Postal codes: 66903
- Dialling codes: 06386
- Vehicle registration: KUS
- Website: Altenkirchen (Pfalz)

Altenkirchen (German pronunciation: [ˌaltn̩ˈkɪʁçn̩]) is an Ortsgemeinde – a municipality belonging to a Verbandsgemeinde, a kind of collective municipality – in the Kusel district in Rhineland-Palatinate, Germany. It belongs to the Verbandsgemeinde of Oberes Glantal, whose seat is in Schönenberg-Kübelberg.

== Geography ==
=== Location ===
The municipality lies, like its neighbours Dittweiler and Frohnhofen, in the Kohlbach valley in the Western Palatinate. Altenkirchen lies at an elevation of some 285 m above sea level, partly in the Kohlbach valley itself and partly in the narrower valleys through which the tributary brooks flow, as well as on their slopes. Roughly a fourth of the municipal area is wooded. The farmland is made up in no small measure of cherry orchards. Some of the mountains in the area reach heights of more than 400 m (Hühnerkopf 441 m).

The municipal area measures 644 ha, of which 148 ha is wooded.

=== Neighbouring municipalities ===
Altenkirchen borders in the north on the municipality of Frohnhofen, in the east on the municipality of Ohmbach, in the south on the municipality of Dittweiler and in the west on the municipality of Breitenbach. Altenkirchen also meets the municipality of Krottelbach at a single point in the northeast.

=== Constituent communities ===
Also belonging to Altenkirchen are the outlying homesteads of Wilgenhof and Hainhof. There is also a Forsthaus (“forester’s house”) in the Ahlenwald (forest).

=== Municipality’s layout ===
The original settlement arose around the church, which stands about 150 m up from the brookside, as does likewise the built-up area, the original village core, around the church with its former graveyard. The important village streets with newer building along their extensions spread out in an almost starlike pattern from the church, Friedhofstraße (“Graveyard Street”, which leads to the new graveyard) running to the north, Breitenbacher Straße running to the west, Hohlstraße running to the south and Schillerstraße, set a bit to the south, running to the east. The rectory stands across the street from the church on Schillerstraße. The graveyard used today lies at the village's north end on the Kohlbach's right bank. On Schulstraße (“School Street”), which branches off from Schillerstraße to the south, stands the former schoolhouse from 1919, which currently is still used for primary school. Another, older, former schoolhouse from 1783 stands on Bergstraße, which branches off from Breitenbacher Straße to the northwest. This building was used by the Altenkirchen Mine Administration (Altenkirchener Grubenverwaltung) in the earlier half of the 19th century as the mine office, and is nowadays under private ownership. Yet another former schoolhouse, in which classes were held between 1820 and 1919, stands on Friedhofstraße. This building is now used as the town hall and the local history museum.

Besides the village street network, there is also the thoroughfare, Sankt Wendeler Straße (Landesstraße 335), which has newer buildings on it, and which runs along the Kohlbach's left bank.

== History ==
=== Antiquity ===
In prehistoric times, there were already people in what is now Altenkirchen, bearing witness to which are archaeological finds from neighbouring municipalities. In Altenkirchen itself, a Stone Age blade was unearthed, which is now kept at Speyer. The whereabouts of a find consisting of Celtic coins unearthed in the 19th century are unfortunately unknown. The remnants of a villa rustica are to be found on the Schlossberg (mountain) near the slopes east of the village. In the several digs that have been undertaken there, coins have been found, as have a statuette (“Mercury of Altenkirchen”) and ceramic pieces. Builders who were doing conversion work on the church in 1978 discovered several examples of Roman spolia. Worthy of note is a stone with an inscription, which unfortunately can now barely be read. Also unearthed was the so-called Entenstein (“Duckstone”), a fragment of a relief with a naked man with a duck on his shoulders, walking behind whom is a bigger duck. Originally, these stones might have come from earlier, Roman buildings that once stood in the Altenkirchen area.

=== Middle Ages ===
Altenkirchen lay within the free Imperial Domain (Reichsland) around the town and castle of Kaiserslautern. When the village was founded is unknown, but what is known is that it belonged to the court of Kübelberg which, beginning in 1312, was taken over time and again by several secular lordships (the County of Sponheim, the County of Veldenz, Electoral Palatinate) as an Imperial pledged holding. According to the 1290 document in which Altenkirchen had its first documentary mention, the priest at the time, Father Theodoricus von Altenkirchen, stated to the Archbishopric of Mainz that the monks on the Remigiusberg had never in his time at Altenkirchen, nor in his time at Hirsau, ever paid taxes or any other tribute to the Archbishop of Mainz. The background to this statement is that the Remigiusberg and the Remigiusland were holdings of Reims, but under ecclesiastical organization, they belonged to the Archbishopric of Mainz. Beginning in 1437, the court of Kübelberg, and along with it the village of Altenkirchen, belonged to the Electoral Palatinate Oberamt of Kaiserslautern until the late 18th century.

=== Modern times ===
From the year 1542, a Weistum (cognate with English wisdom, this was a legal pronouncement issued by men learned in law in the Middle Ages and early modern times) from Altenkirchen has been preserved, according to which the successors of the then already late Junker Hans Blick von Lichtenberg from Bad Dürkheim, in the presence of, among others, the Landschreiber (in Electoral Palatinate, this was an official at the Oberamt level who had certain accounting and legal responsibilities), Job Weidenkopf from Lichtenberg Castle, held farming rights, and the Schultheiß, Heinrich Korb von Kübelberg collected the fees. The Weistum mainly contains lists about the payments to be made by inhabitants of Altenkirchen and Frohnhofen. It also tells one that at this time, the village was held by the noble family Blick von Lichtenberg, whose members for centuries exercised patronage rights over the village. After the family died out in the early 17th century, the Lords of Günderode inherited their holdings. These passed eventually to the Barons of Fürstenwärter. Like all the villages in the area, Altenkirchen, too, suffered greatly from the effects of the harrowing Thirty Years' War, which, it is said, left Altenkirchen with only five families by the time it ended, whereas many local villages in the Kusel area had been utterly wiped out in the war. Newcomers to the area settled in Altenkirchen, thus building the population back up, but then came more war in the late 17th century as King Louis XIV's French troops swept across the land, leaving devastation behind them. Only in the early 18th century was there once again a steady rise in population. It was also at this time that emigration to America began. In 1779, the court of Kübelberg, and along with it the village of Altenkirchen, passed in the course of a territorial reorganization between Electoral Palatinate and the Duchy of Palatine Zweibrücken by way of exchange to the latter party for the villages of Duchroth and Oberhausen and part of the village of Niederkirchen, which until then had been held by Zweibrücken. This was also a transfer from the Electoral Palatinate Oberamt of Kaiserslautern to the Zweibrücken Oberamt of Homburg. Zweibrücken times, however, did not last very long, for the whole feudal system that had shaped life was swept away by the events of the French Revolution. In 1793, the first French Revolutionary troops appeared in the region, and in 1801, France annexed the lands on the Rhine’s left bank. French rule, too, was short-lived, lasting only until 1814. During this time, Altenkirchen lay in the Mairie (“Mayoralty”) of Waldmohr, the Canton of Waldmohr, the Arrondissement of Saarbrücken and the Department of Sarre, whose capital was at Trier.

==== Recent times ====
In 1814, the French withdrew from the German lands on the Rhine's left bank, and Altenkirchen was at first assigned to the Ottweiler district. After a transition period, the Bavarian Rheinkreis (“Rhine District”) came into being in 1816, which later was known as the Bavarian Rheinpfalz (“Rhenish Palatinate”). The administrative structures that had arisen in Napoleonic times were swept aside and Altenkirchen was then assigned to the Landkommissariat of Zweibrücken. In 1818, the village became the seat of its own Bürgermeisterei (“mayoralty”) to which Dittweiler and Frohnhofen (and at first also Breitenbach) also belonged, and which lay in the canton of Waldmohr and the Landkommissariat (later Bezirksamt, and then Landkreis, or district) of Homburg.

In 1848 and 1849, the Kohlbach valley, where Altenkirchen lies, hosted a centre of the Revolutionary movement, in which the schoolteacher Daniel Hirsch is worthy of mention for, among other things, having founded a popular association. After the First World War, the district of Homburg was grouped into the French- and British-ruled Saar Mandate, but the canton of Waldmohr remained in the Free State of Bavaria (the German monarchy had been overthrown, and Bavaria's last king had abdicated), and thus still within Germany. It belonged with a branch location of the administration, which existed until 1940, to the Bezirksamt (district) of Kusel. In 1940, the branch location of the administration was dissolved and also administratively merged with the district of Kusel. Only in the 1968 administrative and territorial reform in Rhineland-Palatinate was the Bürgermeisterei of Altenkirchen dissolved. Since 1972, the municipality has belonged to the Verbandsgemeinde of Schönenberg-Kübelberg.

=== Population development ===
Altenkirchen was a farming village and is today still known far and wide for its cherry growing. In the latter half of the 18th century, the first coalmines were opened (Carls-Fundgrube, Sankt-Paulsgrube and Maximiliansgrube). With mining came the opportunity for some villagers to work at the collieries. One prominent figure in the growth of the Altenkirchen coalmining industry was Johann Paul Weiß from Saxony, who, before his arrival in Altenkirchen, had been undertaking important activities in the Electoral Palatinate mining establishment, and he had even brought experienced miners from his homeland to the Palatinate. Thus, there was a gradual switchover from a farming village to a workers’ village, which even saw many inhabitants seeking mining work in the nearby Saarland. In the late 19th and early 20th centuries, work at the pits came to an end in Altenkirchen itself, forcing almost all the local miners to commute elsewhere to work. Of course, there were opportunities in other lines of work, especially in the multifaceted handicraft industry. Population figures were already rising steeply during the 18th century, and rose threefold in the course of the 19th and 20th centuries. Also noted in that time was the high emigration to North America, especially to the US state of Ohio. With regard to religious affiliation, the inhabitants quite early on were all Evangelical. Even today, Catholic Christians and members of other denominations are in the minority.

The following table shows population development over the centuries for Altenkirchen, with some figures broken down by religious denomination:

Year	1825	1835	1871	1905	2939	1961	1999	2007
Total	496	581	646	773	1,043	1,316	1,497	1,376
Catholic	–					67	45
Evangelical	496					1,243	1,402

=== Municipality’s name ===
Altenkirchen arose near an old church, so called because it somehow related to a “new church” somewhere. This explains its name (alt means “old” in German and Kirche means “church”), but what is not thoroughly explained is just what was meant by this “new church”. Regional historian Ernst Christmann was convinced that this referred to the church at Ohmbach. Other regional historians, though, have put forth the churches at Breitenbach or Kübelberg as candidates. In 1290, Altenkirchen had its first documentary mention as Aldekierke. Other mentions rendered the name Aldenkirchen (1372), Aldenkirch (1410), Allenkirchen (1480) or Altenkirchen (1601), the current form. The local dialectal form of the name is Ahlekerje.

=== Vanished villages ===
Within Altenkirchen's current limits once lay two other villages, both of which vanished even before the Thirty Years' War. They were called Achtweiler and Staßweiler. The former lay southwest of Altenkirchen, while the latter lay northeast. Achtweiler was mentioned in a document in 1571, but all that now bears witness to Staßweiler's existence is rural cadastral toponyms.

== Politics ==
=== Municipal council ===
The council is made up of 16 council members, who were elected by majority vote at the municipal election held on 7 June 2009, and the honorary mayor as chairman.

=== Mayor ===
Altenkirchen's mayor is Manfred Geis.

=== Coat of arms ===
The municipality's arms might be described thus: Argent a church affronty gules, the helm-spire azure, the door and windows Or ensigned with a cross of the same, the chief per fess Or and sable.

The tinctures of the two stripes forming the chief are the colours of both Electoral Palatinate and the Duchy of Palatine Zweibrücken. The church is a canting charge for the village's name, which means “old church”. The arms have been borne since 1986 when they were approved by the now defunct Regierungsbezirk administration in Neustadt an der Weinstraße.

== Culture and sightseeing ==
=== Buildings ===
The following are listed buildings or sites in Rhineland-Palatinate’s Directory of Cultural Monuments:

- Protestant parish church, Schillerstraße 38 – Late Romanesque quire tower, late 13th century, Baroque aisleless church, marked 1756, and tower raising with helm (welsche Haube) from 1818
- Bergstraße 1 – former school; one-floor building with half-hipped roof, 1782/1783; furnishings from the mining administration, 1820
- Breitenbacher Straße 1 – Protestant rectory; plastered building on pedestal, 1861/1862
- Breitenbacher Straße 4 – inn, spacious hewn-stone-framed corner building; characterizes village’s appearance
- Schulstraße 12 – primary school; spacious building with hipped roof, 1914–1919, architect Regional Master Builder Löhmer, Homburg
- Hourstone, between Altenkirchen and Frohnhofen, on St. Wendeler Straße near the turnoff to Krottelbach – 1838/1840

=== Regular events ===
Altenkirchen holds a village festival on the first weekend in July. The church consecration festival, locally known as the Kerwe, goes back to the year 1839 and is held on the first weekend in October. A Christmas Market is held on the first day of Advent. In the 1950s, there was also a Cherry Blossom Festival at which a Blossom Queen was chosen.

=== Museums ===
The Heimatmuseum Altenkirchen, opened in 1987, shows life and work as it was in days of yore.

=== Culinary specialities ===
- Kartoffelwaffeln (“potato waffles”), also called Grumbeerwaffele in Palatinate German

=== Natural monuments ===
Altenkirchen has an old tree at the Römerbrunnen (“Romans’ Spring”) known as the Dicke Eiche (“Fat Oak”).

== Economy and infrastructure ==
=== Economic structure ===
Originally, the village's commercial life was oriented towards agriculture, in which sweet cherry growing, begun in 1742, promoted by Elector Karl Theodor, played a role. Cherry growing is still important today. Beginning in the mid 18th century, coal for household heating was also mined within municipal limits, at first only for a few families’ needs, but later very extensively. The biggest collieries were Carls-Fundgrube (founded in 1768) and Maximiliansgrube. In 1775, the Elector Palatine bestowed bequests upon the mine foremen Meixner and Weiß, thereby starting the more extensive phase of local coalmining. In the 1880s, mining ceased. There was further mining after each of the world wars, but neither revival lasted long. Today, Altenkirchen is a residential community for people in many occupations, and local businesses are mainly service businesses or small production facilities.

=== Transport ===
Altenkirchen lies on Landesstraße 355, which leads to Schönenberg-Kübelberg, and which meets Landesstraße 352 (Quirnbach-Ottweiler) north of the village. Kreisstraße (District Road) 5 links the village directly with the village of Breitenbach to the west. To the southeast runs the Autobahn A 6, and to the northeast is the Autobahn A 62 (Kaiserslautern–Trier). The Glan-Münchweiler, Miesau and Waldmohr interchanges each lie some 12 km.

Serving nearby Glan-Münchweiler is Glan-Münchweiler station on the Landstuhl–Kusel railway. There are hourly trains at this station throughout the day, namely Regionalbahn service RB 67 between Kaiserslautern and Kusel, named Glantalbahn after a former railway line that shared a stretch of its tracks with the Landstuhl–Kusel railway.

=== Education ===
It is likely that there were efforts to introduce schooling into Altenkirchen even before the Thirty Years' War. Records show that in 1782, some 70 or 80 schoolchildren were being taught. The schoolhouse fell into disrepair and was renovated beginning in 1785. Schoolchildren from Dittweiler and Frohnhofen also attended lessons in Altenkirchen. In those days, the married teacher received as a year's remuneration four Malter of grain, worth 16 Gulden, and also 10 Gulden in cash. He also received a Glockenkorn of grain worth 44 Gulden and 24 Gulden’s worth of wood. The schoolchildren also had to pay a school fee, which all together amounted to 10 Gulden. Furthermore, the teacher even worked a major cropfield and a meadow, bringing him a further 10 Gulden. In the 19th century, there were an “upper” school and a “lower” school, each one with an average of 60 pupils. Expenditures for teaching and learning materials and for the teacher's own needs were suggested by the municipality and finalized by the Landkommissariat of Homburg, which usually raised the amount suggested by the municipality. In 1862, expenses for the upper school were assessed at 47.33 Gulden for the garden and fields, 5.00 Gulden for a cord of wood, 12.00 Gulden for the teacher's dwelling and 285.27 Gulden from the municipal coffers. The 350.00 Gulden in school fees from the parents was no longer levied. The grand total was therefore 349.60 Gulden; the municipality had only wanted to pay 323.33 Gulden.

For the “second school” (or “preparatory school”), a similar pattern prevailed, along with a similar total, namely 350 Gulden. The municipality had great difficulty raising this sum, as the families in question mostly found it very hard to pay or could not pay at all. The 146 families owned on average about 3 ha of land each. In a municipal council decision, it says “…although it is very timely for the teacher’s support to be raised, it is also to be seen that the municipality is overburdened with costs.”

Of special importance is that schooling in Altenkirchen has a link with a famous revolutionary's name: Daniel Hirsch. In 1835, Hirsch came to Altenkirchen as a young teacher, aged 21. He succeeded the old, alcoholic teacher Peter Dennis, an old playmate of the later king of Bavaria, Maximilian Joseph I, when Dennis had spent part of his childhood at Schloss Pettersheim in Herschweiler-Pettersheim. Hirsch himself was deemed to be a hardworking and successful teacher, but because of his participation in the 1849 Badish-Palatine Uprising, he was fired, and in 1850, he emigrated to the United States.

In the course of the 20th century, the school began by holding three classes. The teachers often complained about their inadequate living quarters. As a result of school reform after the Second World War, the school was expanded in 1970 to accommodate seven primary school classes, which were also attended by children from neighbouring villages. Hauptschule students have since then attended the Hauptschule at the Schönenberg-Kübelberg school centre. The Altenkirchen primary school has so far been retained.

== Famous people ==
=== Sons and daughters of the town ===
- Otto von Bollinger (1843–1909), anatomist and pathologist

A clergyman's son from Altenkirchen, he attended the grammar school at Kaiserslautern and the Bipontinum at Zweibrücken, going on to study natural sciences in Munich. Having graduated in 1868, he became a battalion doctor in the Franco-Prussian War (1870–1871), and thereafter a member of the board of the Medical Association at Zurich and a professor of pathological anatomy and comparative pathology in Munich. In this capacity he published many medical-scientific works. He was highly decorated, becoming, among other things, a Knight of the Merit Order of the Bavarian Crown. He also discovered actinomycosis.

=== Famous people associated with the municipality ===
Johann Peter Müller (b. 1709 in Rutsweiler an der Lauter; d. 1796 in Ephrata, Pennsylvania, USA)

Later known as John Peter Miller, or simply Peter Miller, before leaving Germany in 1730, he lived for a few years as a boy in Altenkirchen, where his father, Johann Müller, was the minister. Over in the Colonies, Müller made a name for himself in the religious community in Pennsylvania, becoming a prior at the Ephrata Cloister in Ephrata.
