= Landstuhl–Kusel railway =

Branch line in Rhineland-Palatinate, Germany

Landstuhl–Kusel
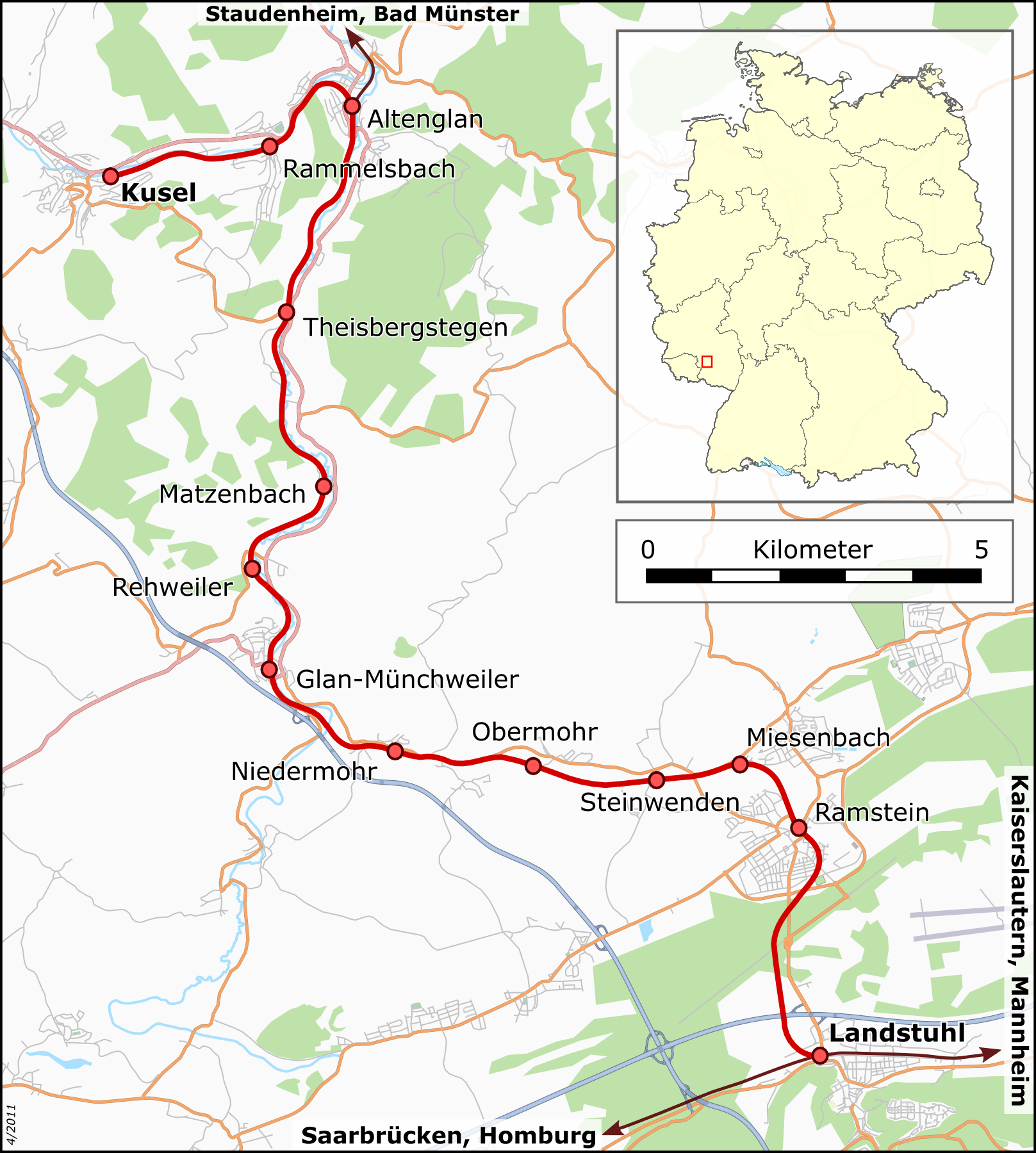

Overview
- Line number: 3202 (Altenglan–Kusel); 3281 (Glan-Münchweiler–Altenglan); 3306 (Landstuhl–Glan-Münchweiler)
- Locale: Rhineland-Palatinate, Germany

Service
- Route number: 671

Technical
- Line length: 28.7 km (17.8 mi)
- Track gauge: 1,435 mm (4 ft 8 1/2 in) standard gauge

The Landstuhl–Kusel railway is a branch line in the German state of Rhineland-Palatinate, connecting the town of Kusel to the railway network. It was the first line built by the Palatine Northern Railway Company (Gesellschaft der Pfälzischen Nordbahnen), which was then responsible within the Palatinate for all railway lines to the north of the Mannheim–Saarbrücken railway (Palatine Ludwig Railway) between Ludwigshafen and Bexbach and the first in the North Palatine Uplands. It was also the only railway in the western part of these uplands that was not threatened with closure at any time. The main purpose of its establishment was the development of the quarries in the area of the Altenglan area, leading to it being sometimes called the Steinbahn (German for "stone railway").

From 1904, the Glan-Münchweiler–Altenglan section was also part of the Glan Valley Railway (Glantalbahn), which was built for strategic reasons, but closed for passenger services between 1961 and 1986. In 1936, an extension to Türkismühle was opened for military reasons, but it was closed down in stages between 1964 and 1970. The route is operated by DB Regio using class 643 (Bombardier Talent) diesel multiple units at hourly services with additional services in the peak hour.

== History ==
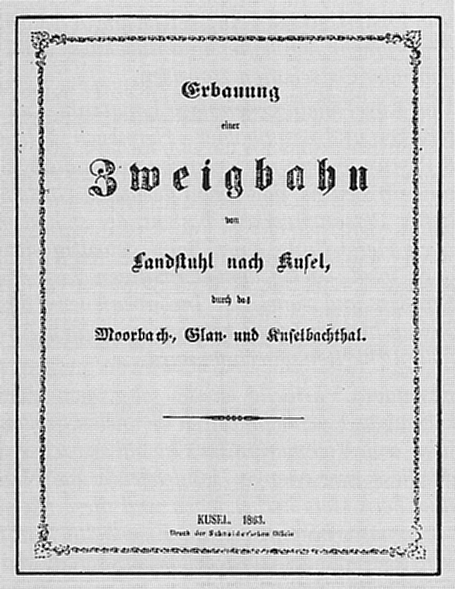
Title page of the memorandum on the construction of the line in 1863

In the early 1860s, the towns of Ramstein and Kusel, which at the time were part of the Kingdom of Bavaria, formed committees to promote the construction of a railway. According to a memorandum published in Kusel in 1861, the railway would branch from the Palatine Ludwig Railway in Landstuhl and run through the Mohrbach, Glan and Kuselbach valleys to Kusel. In the memorandum, it was argued that, among other things, the railway construction would improve the rather poor economic and social conditions of the region. The construction of the proposed Landstuhl–Kusel line under a concession issued in 1866 was funded by an issue of shares for a total of 1,740,000 guilders. The company also was given a government guarantee on its interest.

The construction of the 28.7 km stretch from Landstuhl to Kusel was largely uncomplicated. Cuttings were only necessary in the country around Rammelsbach, where the work force encountered a diorite deposit, which was mined in the following years and gave an additional impetus to rail transport. The Rammelsbach Tunnel was the largest building project along the line. Construction on the section between Glan-Munchweiler and Kusel was delayed because not enough workers could be recruited. The first freight train ran on 28 August 1868.

The Kusel–Landstuhl line was officially opened on 20 September 1868. On this day, a special train also ran from Ludwigshafen to Kusel, which carried, apart from officials of the Palatinate Railway (Pfalzbahn), the former Bavarian Minister of State for Trade and Public Works, Gustav Schlör. The new line was very well received by the population, as it improved the infrastructure of the rural region northwest of Kaiserslautern. Two days later, the line was released for regular traffic.

The operator of the line was initially the Palatine Northern Railways Company, which was responsible from 1870 for all lines north of the Palatine Ludwig Railway (Ludwigshafen–Bexbach), the main trunkline of the Palatine railways, and from 1870 it was operated as part of the Palatinate Railways.

=== Development up to the First World War ===
Since the Palatine Ludwig Railway was often referred to as the Kohlenbahn (“coal railway”) due to its main purpose, the transport of Saar coal, the Landstuhl–Kusel line was called Steinbahn, (“stone railway”) by analogy, because of its importance for the local quarries. In its first years of operation, the line had no passenger station in the municipality of Rammelsbach, located between Altenglan and Kusel, and accordingly only mixed trains (carrying freight and passengers) stopped in the town. The station was finally declared to be a normal passenger station in 1898.

In 1882, the line was downgraded to the branch line. The chain barriers along the line were converted into turnpike barriers in 1888. The construction of signals at the stations was completed in 1899. Between Ramstein and Altenglan bells were used, with the intention of reducing the closing times at level crossings.

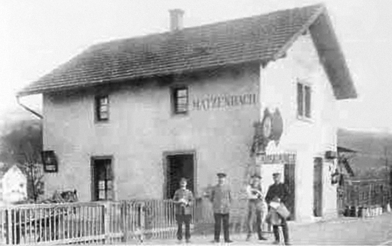
Eisenbach-Matzenbach station (formerly called Matzenbach) in 1912

Since the 1870s, there had been plans for a strategic railway line along the entire Glan. After this was initially thwarted by the opposition of Bavaria, the deterioration of Germany's relations with France caused Bavaria to revise the proposal. First, in 1896 and 1897, the Lauterecken–Staudernheim section of the line subsequently called the Glan Valley Railway (Glantalbahn) was opened as a direct continuation of the Lauter Valley Railway. In 1890, Prussia and Bavaria negotiated a treaty to build a railway from Homburg to Bad Münster, envisaged as the shortest connection from the Saar to the Rhine. The line between Glan-Münchweiler and Altenglan, which would be shared with the line to Kusel, was duplicated in accordance with the requirements of the military. As part of this duplication, the systems of tracks at Glan Munchweiler and Altenglan stations were also upgraded. The latter was rebuilt as a “wedge station” (Keilbahnhof) and also received a new entrance building. The Glan Valley Railway was completed on 1 May 1904. On 1 January 1909, the line along with the other railway lines within the Palatinate became part of the Royal Bavarian State Railways.

=== Development up to the Second World War (1919–1945) ===
In 1920, the line became part of the newly founded Deutsche Reichsbahn. Primarily for military reasons, a continuation from Kusel to Türkismühle was opened in 1936. Nevertheless, it was a year before a continuous train service from Altenglan to Türkismühle. At the same time the route of the line between Altenglan and Rammelsbach was changed since the Rammelsbach tunnel had proved to be too narrow for freight trains. The new line instead ran around the Remigiusberg (hill). In 1937, the speed limit on the Altenglan-Kusel section was increased from 40 to 70 km/h. Responsibility for the line was transferred to the Reichsbahndirektion (railway division) of Saarbrücken at the same time.

Since during the Second World War, the timetable could often not be met, a directory of “essential trains" was published in 1941. This included at least three trains between Landstuhl and Glan-Munchweiler, at least two trains between Glan Munchweiler and Altenglan and at least six and between Altenglan and Kusel. Altenglan station was bombed in 1944 and 1945 due to its function as a railway junction. In 1945, there were also air raids on Rammelsbach and Kusel.

In the last months of the war, a connecting curve was constructed between Rammelsbach and Bedesbach in the current location of Altenglan to the north of Altenglan station. This was established as a possible detour in conjunction with the line to Türkismühle in case the Nahe Valley Railway between Ottweiler and Bad Münster became blocked. In fact, however, it was only used once and dismantled immediately after the end of the war.

=== Deutsche Bundesbahn (1949–1993) ===
The track supervisor's office (Bahnmeisterei) in Altenglan was rebuilt in 1952 and it existed until 1977. A station was built at the community of Obermohr located between Niedermohr and Steinwenden in 1955. The Kusel–Türkismühle line was closed in the period 1955–1970, making Kusel a railhead again. A flood of the Kuselbach on 5 December 1965 closed operations between Altenglan and Kusel that evening and on the following day. Sunday services were abandoned on the line in 1975.

During the 1950s many other adjacent routes in the western North Palatine Uplands were shut down, but the Kusel–Landstuhl line remained open due to its high freight revenue, mainly as a result of the surrounding quarries. After passenger services were closed on the northern section of the neighbouring Glan Valley Railway from Lauterecken-Grumbach to Staudernheim in 1986, the line to Kusel and the Lauter Valley Railway were the only two lines in the region left with rail services. On 9 June 1986, Deutsche Bundesbahn and the state of Rhineland-Palatinate came to an agreement, which divided all the railway lines in the state into three categories. While the costs of operating the Lauter Valley Railway could still be addressed, there was now no question of discontinuing passenger services between Landstuhl and Kusel.

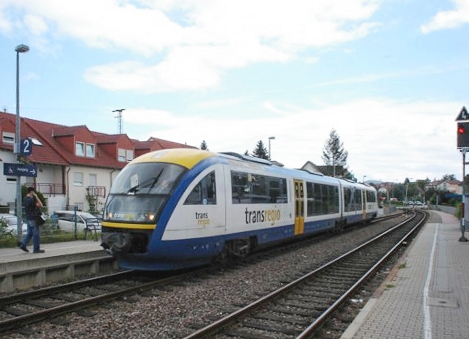
Passenger train in Ramstein station in 2007

In 1988, the stations of Ramstein and Steinwenden were reclassified as halts. A year later, the second track between Glan Munchweiler and Altenglan, which had become superfluous for operations, was dismantled, so that trains could only cross each other at Glan-Munchweiler and Altenglan stations. This led in due time to some operational problems, as for example, in the same year, the line from Rammelsbach was heavily used by gravel trains to supply the construction of the Mannheim–Stuttgart high-speed railway.

On 18 June 1990, DB introduced Signalisierter Zugleitbetrieb (SZB, a system of train control for low-speed branch lines using simplified signalling technology) on the line, which up to that time had only been used on the Nagold Valley Railway.

=== Current development (since 1994) ===
With the introduction of the Rhineland-Palatinate clock-face timetable in 1994, there were improvements to services on the line and it has since been served at least hourly. This required the building of a passing loop at Ramstein halt, leading to the restoring of its classification as a station.

On 28 May 2000, operations were taken over for a period of eight years by the private operator trans regio (Deutsche Regionalbahn GmbH). All trains originally ran non-stop on the Mannheim–Saarbrücken line to Kaiserslautern. Since 2003, some trains stop in Kindsbach, Einsiedlerhof and Vogelweh. Miesenbach station was opened between Ramstein and Steinwenden at the end of 2005.

In 2008, the line celebrated its 140th anniversary and a special train ran from Heidelberg to Kusel on 6 December 2008 to celebrate this occasion. The concession for operating services on the line was re-tendered in 2007. The winner, DB Regio, has operated the line since 14 December 2008 and its contract runs until 2023.

== Route ==
West of Landstuhl station, the line to Saarbrücken separates to the left and the line heads to the north. First, it crosses the Bruch country. From Ramstein the line follows the Mohrbach and runs to the west to Glan-Munchweiler. The line, which is now running through the North Palatine Uplands, then turns north to follow the course of the Glan to Altenglan. It turns then west to follow the course of the Kuselbach to Kusel. From Landstuhl to Niedermohr, the line runs through the district of Kaiserslautern and from Glan-Munchweiler it runs through the district of Kusel.

Originally the chainages on the line were continuous. After the opening of the Glan Valley Railway, the existing chainage was only retained on the Landstuhl–Glan-Munchweiler section. The Glan-Munchweiler–Altenglan section was integrated in the Glan Valley Railway, with the chainage initially starting in the west from Scheidt and running via St. Ingbert, Rohrbach and Homburg—now part of the Mannheim–Saarbrücken line—to Bad Münster. Later, the chainage started from Homburg and these chainages still apply between Glan-Munchweiler and Altenglan. The Altenglan–Kusel section has chainages that start from zero at Altenglan.

== Operations ==
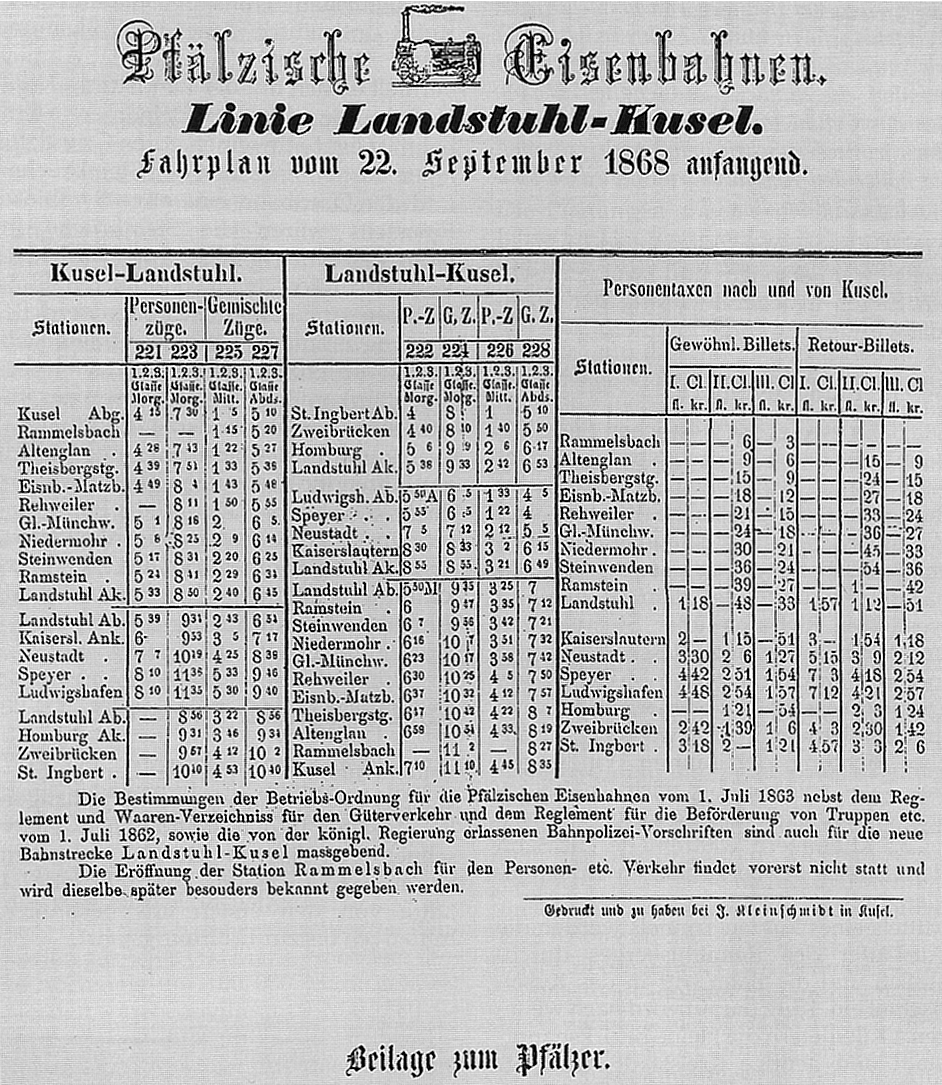
First timetable of 1868

=== Passengers ===
The Kusel–Landstuhl line always had significant passenger traffic. In 1868, it was operated with two mixed and two ordinary passenger trains. Thus, a train shuttled four times between Landstuhl and Kusel each day. The last train remained overnight. Services were extended gradually from 1900. With the opening of Glan Valley Railway there was an increase in services on the Glan-Munchweiler–Altenglan section, since this also was now part of the route between Homburg and Bad Münster. Especially in the 1930s, the timetable included several routes that operated over sections of different lines, such as the Kaiserslautern–Lauterecken-Grumbach–Altenglan–Kusel route. Since the 1950s, there has been always at least ten pairs of trains each day between Landstuhl and Kusel. From the early 1950s, a so-called Städteschnellzug ("city express", a supplement-free express train) ran between Kusel and Heidelberg. In 1954, it was downgraded to a semi-fast train (Eilzug). It was discontinued in 1979.

The route is listed in the Deutsche Bahn time table as route number (KBS) 671 and is operated hourly as the Glantalbahn (Regionalbahn 67). Most trains run to or from Kaiserslautern.

=== Freight ===
Freight traffic to the surrounding quarries always had great importance along the line, giving rise to the name of Steinbahn (stone railway). Even before the opening of the railway, the municipality of Rammelsbach leased a quarry site to the Palatine Northern Railways Company on 1 January 1868, which supplied 200 wagons of cobblestones to Berlin using the line a year later. This train was the first operation over the line. As part of the nationalisation of the Palatinate Railway, it became a secondary operation of the Bavarian State Railway Administration. Even now, it is used by gravel trains.

In 1920, a local freight train (Nahgüterzug) ran from Kaiserslautern to Kusel and another ran between Altenglan and Kusel. A through freight train (Durchgangsgüterzug) ran from Kaiserslautern to Kusel and, if necessary, an additional through freight train ran between Kaiserslautern and Altenglan.

Several quarries also existed in the immediate vicinity of Altenglan, so the local station also had an extensive infrastructure for transferring freight. Another quarry was in Theisbergstegen, which like Rammelsbach was the starting point for freight trains. From the 1990s, its importance declined gradually until it was closed in 2004.

In contrast, freight played no major role at the stations between Landstuhl and Eisenbach-Matzenbach. In September 2011, a 2.4 kilometre-long siding was opened, branching off the route south of Ramstein and connecting a woodworking company.

=== Rolling stock ===
At the opening of the Kusel–Landstuhl line, a class 1 B locomotive was used, although it was originally designed for hauling freight trains. Locomotives of class A 1 also ran over the line in the first years of operations. The latter were retired in the late 1870s, because they had been built in the 1840s. From about 1870 to about 1920 passenger services were hauled by class P 1.I locomotives and freight was hauled by class G 2.I and G 2.II locomotives. From about 1890 to about 1920 class T 1 locomotives were also used.

From the late 1960s, the steam locomotives were gradually replaced by diesels of class V100. By the end of the winter 1974/75 timetable, Kaiserslautern locomotive depot (Bahnbetriebswerk) no longer operated steam engines of class 23 and 50 for hauling passenger trains. In 1973, class 218 diesel locomotives were introduced. The class V100 locomotives operated on the line until May 1988. Both classes were used to haul Silberling coaches. In January 2000, the class V100 locomotives once again hauled trains for a few months, because they were less noisy during the winter when train heating was required.

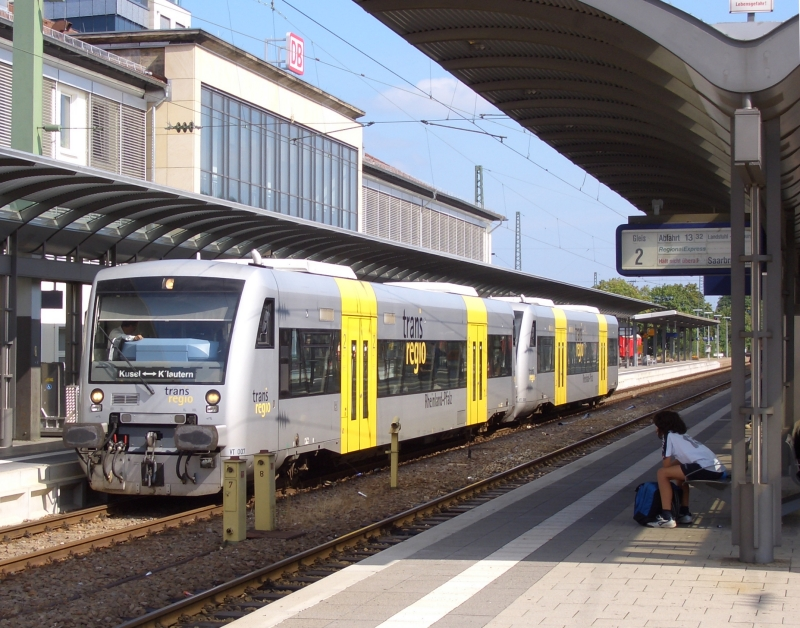
RegioShuttle to Kusel at the time of Trans regio operations in Kaiserslautern Hauptbahnhof

From the end of the 1950s to the late 1980s, battery electric railcars of class 515 ran on the line. From 1960 to the early 1980s, Uerdingen railbuses also operated some passenger services. From the late 1980s passenger services were operated with class 628/928 diesel multiple units. From 2000 to 2008 these were operated by trans regio with Regioshuttles. Since December 2008, the section is mainly operated by DB Regio with modern diesel multiple units of class 643.
