= Münchweiler =

Münchweiler may refer to:

- Glan-Münchweiler, municipality in the district of Kusel, in Rhineland-Palatinate, Germany
- Glan-Münchweiler (Verbandsgemeinde), collective municipality in the district of Kusel, Rhineland-Palatinate, Germany
- Münchweiler am Klingbach, municipality in Südliche Weinstraße district, in Rhineland-Palatinate, western Germany
- Münchweiler an der Alsenz, municipality in the Donnersbergkreis district, in Rhineland-Palatinate, Germany
- Münchweiler an der Rodalb, municipality in Südwestpfalz district, in Rhineland-Palatinate, western Germany
