= Oberes Glantal =

Municipality in Rhineland-Palatinate, Germany

- Verbandsgemeinde
- Location of Oberes Glantal within Kusel district
- Interactive map of Oberes Glantal
- Location within Germany Location within Rhineland-Palatinate
- Coordinates: 49°25′N 7°23′E
- Country: Germany
- State: Rhineland-Palatinate
- District: Kusel
- Seat: Schönenberg-Kübelberg
- Subdivisions: 23 municipalities

Area
  - Total: 155.91 km^{2} (60.20 sq mi)

Population (2025-12-31)
  - Total: 28,644
  - Density: 183.72/km^{2} (475.84/sq mi)
- Time zone: UTC+01:00 (CET)
  - Summer (DST): UTC+02:00 (CEST)
- Website: www.vgog.de

Oberes Glantal ("upper valley of the Glan") is a Verbandsgemeinde ("collective municipality") in the district of Kusel, in Rhineland-Palatinate, Germany. The seat of the Verbandsgemeinde is in Schönenberg-Kübelberg. It was formed on 1 January 2017 by the merger of the former Verbandsgemeinden Glan-Münchweiler, Schönenberg-Kübelberg and Waldmohr.

The Verbandsgemeinde Oberes Glantal consists of the following Ortsgemeinden ("local municipalities"):

1. Altenkirchen
2. Börsborn
3. Breitenbach
4. Brücken
5. Dittweiler
6. Dunzweiler
7. Frohnhofen
8. Glan-Münchweiler
9. Gries
10. Henschtal
11. Herschweiler-Pettersheim
12. Hüffler
13. Krottelbach
14. Langenbach
15. Matzenbach
16. Nanzdietschweiler
17. Ohmbach
18. Quirnbach
19. Rehweiler
20. Schönenberg-Kübelberg
21. Steinbach am Glan
22. Wahnwegen
23. Waldmohr
