= Hüffler =

- Municipality
- Coat of arms

- Location of Hüffler within Kusel district
- Interactive map of Hüffler
- Location within Germany Location within Rhineland-Palatinate
- Coordinates: 49°29′44″N 7°23′40″E
- Country: Germany
- State: Rhineland-Palatinate
- District: Kusel
- Municipal assoc.: Oberes Glantal

Government
  - Mayor (2019–24): Helge Schwab

Area
  - Total: 3.65 km^{2} (1.41 sq mi)
- Elevation: 312 m (1,024 ft)

Population (2025-12-31)
  - Total: 473
  - Density: 130/km^{2} (336/sq mi)
- Time zone: UTC+01:00 (CET)
  - Summer (DST): UTC+02:00 (CEST)
- Postal codes: 66909
- Dialling codes: 06384
- Vehicle registration: KUS
- Website: www.vg-glm.de

Hüffler is an Ortsgemeinde – a municipality belonging to a Verbandsgemeinde, a kind of collective municipality – in the Kusel district in Rhineland-Palatinate, Germany. It belongs to the Verbandsgemeinde of Oberes Glantal.

== Geography ==
=== Location ===
Hüffler is a linear village – by some definitions, a “thorpe” – that lies in the Bledesbach valley (Standard High German name: Bledesbachtal; locally customary name: Saubeeredaal or Saubeeretal) along Landesstraße (State Road) 360 and one other, parallel road. One road links Kusel with Glan-Münchweiler. Running almost parallel to the village is the Autobahn A 62 (Kaiserslautern–Trier). The elevation on the valley floor is 310 m above sea level. This rises to either side of the village. The highest hill is the Dillmeßrech or Dilmersrech at 390 m above sea level. At its highest point, the Autobahn A 62 (Kaiserslautern–Trier) cuts through the hill. To the village’s west, the land rises up to a height of 370 m. The woodlands stretch mainly along the slopes on the Bledesbach’s right bank.

=== Neighbouring municipalities ===
Hüffler borders in the north on the municipality of Schellweiler, in the northeast on the municipality of Etschberg, in the southeast on the municipalities of Rehweiler and Quirnbach, in the southwest on the municipality of Wahnwegen and in the northwest on the municipality of Konken.

=== Municipality’s layout ===
Hüffler’s municipal area, which is not very big, sustained great losses with the building of the Autobahn in the years 1938-1941 and 1966-1970. On the other hand, the work unearthed many fossils from early geological formations. The drawback was that this involved the eastern part of the municipal area being utterly split off from the rest, making it very difficult to reach. From 1974 to 1979, the Cultural Office undertook a classic Flurbereinigung, as part of which the Bledesbach and the Kehlbach were graded, and their banks were reinforced with hard stone. Rural cadastral names were not changed as a result of the work. The pattern of the built-up area can be recognized even in the original cadastral survey undertaken in 1849. Then, properties stood only along the highway on the brook’s right bank (Kirchenstraße and Hauptstraße) and on a parallel way beyond the brook (Alte Straße). In the time that followed, both areas grew in length, cross-links were built and there was further expansion mainly towards the west. Between the two world wars, the built-up area expanded very little. Hüffler’s greatest expansion came after currency reform in 1948. Many gaps in the built-up area were filled in and new building developments were laid out: Schulstraße, Mauerstraße, Flurstraße, Am Bäumchen. The two village churches stand at each end of Kirchstraße (fittingly enough, “Church Street”), the Catholic one at the south end and the Evangelical at the north. The graveyard lies west of the village up a laneway off Mauerstraße. The school built in 1966 stands on Schulstraße (also fittingly, “School Street”), likewise to the west. In the north of Hüffler’s outlying countryside, a rural road leads to the sporting ground in the cadastral area called the Isaak, or Isak. The village is today mainly a residential community for commuters.

== History ==
=== Antiquity ===
Even before the First World War, amateur archaeologists recovered two bronze rings from a barrow from Hallstatt times. Their whereabouts is today, however, unknown. Likewise at this time, a cremation grave field was supposedly destroyed. While digging in the field known as “Heidenhübel”, round, funnel-shaped pits filled with ash, stones and other material were unearthed, believed to be dwelling places of people who lived in the New Stone Age. During excavations for the Autobahn, Roman graves were found along the old Roman road, which had a breadth of up to 12 m and ran for some 400 m on the hills east of the village. A closed bronze ring measuring 7 cm across was found by archaeologist Josef Engels in 1967 next to the Roman road at the Autobahn building site. Roman coins were also found during the Autobahn’s construction along this Roman road, which itself was built in Gallo-Roman times. Celts, and later also Romans, may have been the first settlers. Moreover, in 1930, five barrows from pre-Roman times were found.

=== Middle Ages ===
As early as 1127, the monks from Reims built a Benedictine collegiate foundation on the nearby Remigiusberg hill (368 m) near Kusel, which made the Remigiusberg into the ecclesiastical hub of the whole Remigiusland. The name “Hüffler” had its first documentary mention in the foundation’s cartulary in 1305, when a freeman named Konradi from Hüffler, as Schöffe (roughly “lay jurist”) in an agreement that a knight from the Wadenau Estate (Dennweiler-Frohnbach) had concluded for the foundation’s benefit, was named as a witness. In this time, Hüffler belonged to the Provostry of Remigiusberg, an affiliated monastery of the Bishop’s Church in Reims. The Reims holdings were taken over as a Vogtei in the mid 12th century by the Counts of Veldenz. The Counts of Veldenz built Castle Lichtenberg near Kusel about 1214 and made that the seat of their lordly might. In 1444, the County of Veldenz met its end when Count Friedrich III of Veldenz died without a male heir. His daughter Anna wed King Ruprecht’s son Count Palatine Stephan. By uniting his own Palatine holdings with the now otherwise heirless County of Veldenz – his wife had inherited the county, but not her father’s title – and by redeeming the hitherto pledged County of Zweibrücken, Stephan founded a new County Palatine, as whose comital residence he chose the town of Zweibrücken: the County Palatine – later Duchy – of Palatinate-Zweibrücken.

=== Modern times ===
It was during Zweibrücken times that Hüffler suffered under the Thirty Years' War and French King Louis XIV’s wars of conquest. After the Thirty Years' War, Hüffler was empty. The people had fled before the soldiers’ advance, and some only began coming back twenty years later. Only with newcomers in the 18th century was there once again strong population growth. Hüffler belonged then to the Schultheißerei of Pfeffelbach in the Zweibrücken Oberamt of Lichtenberg.

==== Recent times ====
The Dukes of Zweibrücken were ousted in the time of the French Revolution, about 1794. France annexed the Palatinate in 1798 and held it until 1814. Hüffler belonged to the Mairie (“Mayoralty”) of Quirnbach, the Canton of Kusel and the Department of Sarre. It was at about this time that coal mining began in Hüffler at two pits: “Am Berg” and “Auf der Hube”. The seam was about 30 cm thick. The coal itself, however, could not have been of very high quality, for it had a rather high water content. Beginning in 1816, Hüffler belonged within the Kingdom of Bavaria to the Bürgermeisterei (“Mayoralty”) of Quirnbach in the Landcommissariat (later Bezirksamt and then Landkreis or district) of Kusel in the Rheinkreis. On 1 April 1818, as a result of the Congress of Vienna, a state commission was formed in what was now called the Rheinkreis (Bavaria’s new exclave on the Rhine’s left bank). This is held to be the hour of the Kusel district’s birth, and Hüffler has belonged to this district ever since. Smaller administrative units were also established. In Hüffler’s case, as in many others, villages were grouped together and had joint municipal administration and mayoral offices. Since 1946, Hüffler has been part of the then newly founded state of Rhineland-Palatinate. After the Second World War, the self-administering municipality of Hüffler remained at first in the Bürgermeisterei of Quirnbach, but in the course of administrative restructuring in Rhineland-Palatinate, which saw the formation of bigger local administrative units, it passed to the Verbandsgemeinde of Glan-Münchweiler in 1972, once the district’s Verbandsgemeinden had been founded.

=== Population development ===
The oldest record about inhabitants in Hüffler comes from 1480. Living then in the village were eleven people who were liable to taxation. According to a 1609 ecclesiastical protocol, Hüffler then had 85 inhabitants in 18 families, 47 of them children. In 1688, thus 40 years after the Thirty Years' War had ended, only seven families were counted. In 1693 it was still seven families. By 1704, this had risen slightly to nine. Emigration came mainly in the 19th century; about 70 to 80 persons went to the United States. In the First World War, 15 soldiers from Hüffler fell; in the Second World War, 54 fell or went missing. From 1950, the population figures rose steadily, but in more recent years, they seem to have been stagnating.

The following table shows population development over the centuries for Hüffler, with some figures broken down by religious denomination:

Year	1802	1836	1867	1950	1958	1966	1984	1997	2008
Total	358	390	472	505	559	568	586	587	596
Evangelical	328	349				469	456	418	405
Catholic	30	41				90	112	109	125
none								33	52
no answer								27	14

=== Municipality’s name ===
The name Hüffler first crops up in a 1305 document from the Remigiusberg Monastery, which has been handed down to the present in a cartulary. It deals with a donation from a Knight of Wadenau, and also mentions a Schöffe (roughly “lay jurist”) named Konrad von Hufflers. Further mentions are: Hiffelers (1446), Huffelers (1460), Hüfflers (1587), Hüffler (1790). There have been various attempts to interpret the name. Supposedly, the village was founded on one of the Remigiusberg monks’ Hufen, a Hufe or Hube being an area of land comparable to an oxgang, or a rural, settled place made up of worked cropland together with the attendant farmstead. The name Hüffweiler has also come up here and there, but only in 18th century documents, never in any very old ones. Researcher Ernst Christmann spoke of a settlement near rose hip shrubs (Hagebuttensträucher in German), while Dolch and Greule trace the village’s name back to the personal name Hüffelin.

=== Vanished villages ===
A centre named Rintzweiler or Rindsweiler (both pronounced the same way) once lay south of Hüffler. In 1439, it had its first documentary mention as Runtzwiler, relayed to the present day as a copy in a 17th-century Veldenz cartulary. In 1609, Rintzweiler had 83 inhabitants. The name Rintzweiler appears likewise in original documents from the 14th and 16th centuries, but by the 17th century, it appears no more. Quite likely, the village was wiped out in the Thirty Years' War. Today, a new building zone bears the name Am Rindschweiler Berg to commemorate this vanished village.

== Religion ==
Records in the Kusel Reformed (Calvinist) church register say that the inhabitants of the municipality of Hüffler belonged beginning about 1567 to the church in Kusel. Family records were also kept in this register from this time. The actual books are now to be found at the Protestant Church Archive in Speyer. From 1868, the villages of Hüffler and Wahnwegen together had their own vicariate, which in 1948 was broadened to become a self-administering parish. In 1875 and 1876, the Protestant church in Hüffler was built; it was consecrated on 22 October 1876. Since then, Schellweiler’s Protestants have also joined the parish of Hüffler. Hüffler’s, Schellweiler’s and Wahnwegen’s Catholics founded a branch community of Saint Giles’s Church (Ägidiuskirche) in Kusel in 1958. In early August 1957, the church built by Catholics with contributions from the United States was consecrated by Bishop Markus Emanuel in Speyer. The Catholic Church of Mary Queen of Heaven (Kirche Maria Königin) stands on a hill at the village’s southern end. It was built by architect Franz Schöberl in 1975-1976. Currently, besides some 5% of the population with no religion and adherents of other faiths, 75% of the population is Evangelical and 20% is Catholic.

== Politics ==
=== Municipal council ===
The council is made up of 12 council members, who were elected by proportional representation at the municipal election held on 7 June 2009, and the honorary mayor as chairman.

The municipal election held on 7 June 2009 yielded the following results:

Year	SPD	voters’ group	Total
2009	5	7	12 seats
2004	by majority vote		12 seats

=== Mayor ===
Hüffler’s mayor is Helge Schwab.

=== Coat of arms ===
The German blazon reads: Über erhöhtem schwarzen Schildfuß, darin sich zwei gekreuzte goldene Bergbauhämmer befinden, darüber in Silber ein flammenspeiender rotbewehrter blauer Drachen.

The municipality’s arms might in English heraldic language be described thus: Per fess abased argent a dragon sans hind gambes rampant azure armed and langued gules, issuant from his mouth fire proper, and sable a hammer and pick per saltire Or.

The tinctures that have been used are a reference to the village’s former lordly allegiances. The hammer and pick refer to the mining that was once done within the municipal limits. The dragon charge is supposedly drawn from an old municipal seal. The arms have been borne since 15 March 1984 when they were approved by the now defunct Rheinhessen-Pfalz Regierungsbezirk administration in Neustadt an der Weinstraße.

=== Flag ===
Likewise approved by the old Regierungsbezirk administration was the municipality’s flag. Approval was granted in 1986 to bear a flag in yellow and blue with the municipal coat of arms in the middle. It may be borne in both horizontal and vertical variations.

== Culture and sightseeing ==
=== Buildings ===
The following are listed buildings or sites in Rhineland-Palatinate’s Directory of Cultural Monuments:

- Protestant parish church, Kirchenstraße 8 – one-naved stone-block building, 1875/1876, architect Franz Schöberl, Speyer
- Alte Straße 26 and 28 – sandstone-framed Quereinhäuser (combination residential and commercial houses divided for these two purposes down the middle, perpendicularly to the street), no. 26 1855/1856, no. 28 marked 1838; former piggery

=== Regular events ===
Hüffler’s kermis (church consecration festival, locally known as the Kerb) is held on the fourth Sunday after Michaelmas (29 September) and lasts five days. Every year, on the first weekend in July, the municipality stages, in collaboration with local clubs, a village festival (Dorffest) on the primary school’s grounds. The municipality also invites the village’s older citizens every year to a seniors’ celebration. Not too many years ago, Hüffler was among those villages that still observed the peculiar Western Palatine custom known as the Pfingstquack, observed at Whitsun (Pfingsten in German); the —quack part of the custom’s name refers to a rhyme that the children recite as they go door to door begging for money with their gorse-decked wagon. The rhyme generally begins with the line “Quack, Quack, Quack”. The Saint Martin’s Day Parade is in the kindergarten’s care, and Hüffler and Wahnwegen take turns each year lighting Saint Martin’s Fire.

=== Public institutions ===
Until 2001, the municipality maintained a library that was accessible to every member of the public. Owing to dwindling interest it was closed and it is now run by the “Bedesbachtal” primary school as a municipal library.

=== Sport and leisure ===
Citizens interested in culture attend concerts, plays and presentations in the district seat of Kusel, only 5 km away. Hüffler has an extensive leisure park called Am Isack, which lies on the former prospecting ground. It has campsites, sporting grounds and tennis courts. Local clubs and visitors also have an angling pond and a grill pavilion at their disposal. Hüffler also has a sport club, SV Hüffler. This is known mainly for its football department, but it also offers tennis. Until summer 2008, football had to be played on a hard pitch, but after the club’s 50th anniversary, the field was converted to grass in the 2008/2009 season. The tennis department has two sand courts.

=== Clubs ===
Said to be an active sponsor of culture are the 90-year-old Evangelical church choir and the 75-year-old “Frohsinn” men’s singing club. The sport club, mentioned above, is more than 70 years old. A very active countrywomen’s club with 105 members has existed for more than 40 years. Other clubs that can be named are the FCK-Fan-Club „Saubeertal“ (1. FC Kaiserslautern football fan club), an angling sport club, the “Isak-Rancher” leisure club, a skat club and the SPD local chapter.

== Economy and infrastructure ==
=== Economic structure ===
Until the early 20th century, the populace earned its livelihood from farming, although besides working the land, there were also jobs in crafts. As farming declined, though, so did the old crafts that had been handed down from yore, blacksmith, metalworker, painter, saddler, cooper, shoemaker and tailor. Also worth noting is that within Hüffler’s limits until the end of the 19th century, up to four collieries were being run for a time. The colliery “Am Berg” mined 8 554 t of coal between 1845 and 1880 with six employees. At the colliery on the Schindelberg, seven miners worked. Up to 1870, they mined 2 373 t of coal. Emperor Napoleon granted the pit on the land “auf der Hub” a certificate of concession on 1 November 1805. From old documents it is known that until 1879, there was a brewery in Hüffler named “Hornung”. When the schoolhouse was being built in 1963, workers struck a beer cellar hewn in the sandstone. In 1912, stone quarrying was begun at the Am Isack ground, and work continued until the 1950s. The stone in question was intrusive bodies of melaphyre covered in sedimentary deposits such as sandstone, shale and carbonaceous shale. On a ring about 200 to 300 m across running round the intrusive body were once found sandstone quarries. This shows that the hot magma masses were thrust as high as this only in this area, while nearby they settled into layers farther below. When this intrusion happened is still not known. The age of the surrounding Rotliegend layers, however, is known to be roughly 240,000,000 years.

Milestones in Hüffler’s Economic Development
Date	Event
1903/1904	Centralized waterworks built
1980	Connection to the Ohmbach Valley joint water authority’s waterworks
1925/1926	Electrical supply by Pfalzwerke
1954	First telephone in the village
1956	First television set
1972	Mortuary built
1970/1971	Sewer system built
1980-1984	Recreational spaces on the Isak built
1991	Cable hookup by Pfalzwerke
1960-1964 and 1990-1996	Participation in the contest Unser Dorf soll schöner werden (“Our village should become lovelier”)
1989	Village renewal

Hüffler’s Economic Development by Sector
Sector	1950	1965	1998
Agricultural (run as main business)	128	10	2
Agricultural (run as secondary business)	20	15	3
Miners	35	30	1
Ironworkers	5	1	—
Diamond cutters	10	5	—
Bricklayers	6	4	2
Quarrymen	4	3	—
Quarrying businesses	1	1	—
Plastering businesses	1	1	—
Bricklaying businesses	1	1	—
Butcher’s shops	1	1	1
Bakeries	1	1	1
Grocer’s shops	5	3	1
Inns	2	2	2
Raiffeisen yards	1	1	—
Milk pools	1	1	—
Threshing cooperatives	1	1	—
Haulage businesses	—	—	1
Factory workers	3	3	~115

=== Education ===
At an auction of church property in 1712, citizens of the so-called Hüfflertal (Hüffler, Schellweiler and Wahnwegen) acquired plots of land in the Hüffler municipal area to be able to keep a schoolmaster to teach the children. From this time onwards, there was a school for these three villages. In 1715, thirty children were attending school. Beginning in 1726, classes were held in Hüffler. As of 1785, only children from Hüffler were taught at the Hüffler schoolhouse. In 1829, a new one was built. This was given an upper floor in 1882 and it was modernized in 1929. The commercial building, which was then already there, having been built in the 19th century for the schoolteacher’s maintenance, could now be removed. In 1966 arose yet another schoolhouse, this one with four classrooms, and from 1972, it housed the “Bledesbachtal” primary school. Since that time, Hauptschule students have been attending the school in Herschweiler-Pettersheim. Owing to dwindling numbers of children, the “Bledesbachtal” school was closed in 2004. Many students also attend Realschule or Gymnasium in Kusel. There was a kindergarten in Hüffler as early as the war years (1939-1945), but after the war, it was never opened again. In 1975, however, a new kindergarten was set up at the youth centre at the Evangelical rectory on Mrs. Hannelore Butterweck’s initiative. This lasted until 1982. Since then, the former schoolhouse in Wahnwegen has been used as a kindergarten, after having been remodelled for its new users. Sponsors of the kindergarten, which goes by the name Regenbogen (“Rainbow”), are the municipalities of Hüffler and Wahnwegen. Children from Hüffler reach the place by bus.

=== Transport ===
As mentioned under Municipality’s layout above, Autobahn A 62 (Kaiserslautern–Trier) runs through the municipal area, some 300 or 400 m along the edge of the village. The nearest interchange (Glan-Münchweiler) lies only 4 km away from Hüffler. Bundesstraße 420 lies roughly 5 km away. Those without cars reach shopping and administrative places in Kusel, Glan-Münchweiler or Homburg on the public bus. There are also railway stations in Kusel and Glan-Münchweiler.

== Famous people ==
=== Famous people associated with the municipality ===
- Walter Mannweiler (b. 1901 in Pirmasens; d. 1960 in Solothurn, Switzerland) — Writer and theologian, worked beginning in 1929 for a few years as an administrator in the vicariate of Hüffler-Wahnwegen and also in the parish of Glan-Münchweiler, and in Switzerland he wrote a series of books on philosophy of religion.
