= Langenbach, Kusel =

Langenbach
- Municipality
- Coat of arms

- Location of Langenbach within Kusel district
- Interactive map of Langenbach
- Location within Germany Location within Rhineland-Palatinate
- Coordinates: 49°29′43″N 7°19′46″E
- Country: Germany
- State: Rhineland-Palatinate
- District: Kusel
- Municipal assoc.: Oberes Glantal

Government
  - Mayor (2019–24): Wolfgang Schneider

Area
  - Total: 6.59 km^{2} (2.54 sq mi)
- Elevation: 303–463 m (994–1,519 ft)

Population (2025-12-31)
  - Total: 464
  - Density: 70.4/km^{2} (182/sq mi)
- Time zone: UTC+01:00 (CET)
  - Summer (DST): UTC+02:00 (CEST)
- Postal codes: 66909
- Dialling codes: 06384
- Vehicle registration: KUS

Langenbach (German pronunciation: [ˈlaŋənbax]) in the Palatinate is an Ortsgemeinde – a municipality belonging to a Verbandsgemeinde, a kind of collective municipality – in the Kusel district in Rhineland-Palatinate, Germany. It belongs to the Verbandsgemeinde of Oberes Glantal.

== Geography ==
=== Location ===
The long linear village (or, by some definitions of the word, thorpe) lies in the upper Ohmbach valley, in the Ohmbach's headwaters, in the Western Palatinate, near the boundary with the Saarland. The Ohmbach itself rises north of the village inside Selchenbach’s limits at an elevation of 400 m (1,300 ft) above sea level. It was formerly also called the Langenbach. Even in its upper reaches, the brook flows through several big fishing ponds. Particularly on the left bank, the slope climbs up steeply from the village, likewise to a height of roughly 400 m (1,300 ft) above sea level. Not quite as steep is the land on the right bank, spreading out from which, southwards, is the greater part of the municipal area. Here the land reaches the 462-metre-high (1,516 ft) Geisberg, the highest point within Langenbach’s limits. Beneath this peak stretches the Langenbach air sport grounds, where motorized aircraft and gliders can take off and land. The municipal area measures 659 ha (1,630 acres), of which 168 ha (420 acres) is wooded.

=== Neighbouring municipalities ===
Langenbach borders in the northeast on the municipality of Konken, in the southeast on the municipality of Herschweiler-Pettersheim, in the south on the municipality of Krottelbach, in the southwest on the town of Sankt Wendel and in the northwest on the municipality of Selchenbach. Langenbach also meets the municipality of Albessen at a single point in the north.

=== Constituent communities ===
Also belonging to Langenbach is the outlying homestead of Langenbacher Mühle.

=== Municipality’s layout ===
The village runs mostly along the brook’s right bank for more than two kilometres, along a road that leads from Landesstraße 350 through to Bundesstraße 420. From the village’s lower end to its upper, the elevation rises from 300 m (980 ft) above sea level to some 335 m (1,099 ft) above sea level along this road. New building zones arose on the slope over on the left bank and in the dales of smaller brooks that flow into the Ohmbach. At these brooks’ mouths, the settlement has become thicker as this is where the older parts of the village were built. The Einfirsthaus ("single-roof-ridge house") makes clear by being quite widespread in the village that the villagers formerly earned their livelihoods mainly from farming. The former schoolhouse at Schulstraße 1 has been converted into a village community centre. The former Langenbacher Mühle (mill) stands some 500 m (1,600 ft) downstream from the village. It was also once called Konken-Langenbachermühle. Besides Langenbach and Herschweiler, the village of Konken was also territorially grouped with this mill. Upstream from the village stands a fisherman's cabin, while the air sport grounds lie some two kilometres south of the village. The graveyard and the sporting ground are on the slopes on the Ohmbach's left bank.

== History ==
=== Antiquity ===
A group of five barrows from earlier La Tène times are to be found on the knoll of the Geisberg. One was opened in 1896. The grave goods gathered on that archaeological dig are kept at the museum in Speyer. although some have also gone missing. They are shards of bottles and fragments of spearheads and arrowheads. Finds in neighbouring villages also show that the area was settled in Roman times.

=== Middle Ages ===
Langenbach lay in the so-called Remigiusland around Kusel, a part of the original Imperial Domain (Reichsland) around Kaiserslautern, which was donated in the late 6th century by a Frankish king to the Archbishopric of Reims. The settlement of Langenbach itself is known to have arisen only a few hundred years after the donation, perhaps in the 10th century. In 1127, Count Gerlach I from the Nahegau founded the County of Veldenz and at the same time became the Schutzvogt over the Remigiusland. A younger line of the Counts of Veldenz, founded about 1270 by Heinrich von Geroldseck, died out in 1444. Count Friedrich III, the last count, never had a male heir. His daughter Anna married King Ruprecht's son Count Palatine Stephan. By uniting his own Palatine holdings with the now otherwise heirless County of Veldenz – his wife had inherited the county, but not her father's title – and by redeeming the hitherto pledged County of Zweibrücken, Stephan founded a new County Palatine, as whose comital residence he chose the town of Zweibrücken: the County Palatine – later Duchy – of Palatinate-Zweibrücken. The name of the village of Langenbach near Konken – there are many places in Germany named Langenbach – first cropped up in taxation rolls, such as the steward's bill from Lichtenberg (1445/1446) and the rolls from the Amt of Lichtenberg (1480).

=== Modern times ===
Langenbach shared a history with the Duchy of Palatinate-Zweibrücken up until that state was swept away in the events of the French Revolution. In Johannes Hofman's 1588 description of the Amt of Lichtenberg, it says: "The twelfth main ground has its origin and beginning up above at the thicket called im Hähn, and stretches thence by the villages of Oberlangebach, Niederlangebach, Herßweiler and Pfedersheim below which it takes in the Crofftelbacher Grundt, going on down towards the Ombach on the border." As early as 1449, the names Oberlangenbach and Niederlangenbach appeared in a document. It is likely that the two centres did not grow together until the 19th century. Like all the Kusel region's villages, Langenbach, too, suffered greatly under the effects of the Thirty Years' War. Even before the war, the village was quite small, with an ecclesiastical protocol from 1609 (nine years before the war broke out) reporting that there were six hearths (households) in the village with 45 inhabitants. How many people survived the war in Langenbach is still unknown, although what is known is that in general very few were left in the region's villages, with some villages even being left empty after the war. There was also sickness, in particular the Plague, which also claimed many lives. Newcomers bolstered the population somewhat, but then came more losses with French King Louis XIV’s wars of conquest towards the end of the 17th century. Only in the 18th century did the population grow steadily.

==== Recent times ====
The French Revolution put an end to the Duchy of Palatinate-Zweibrücken. The German lands on the Rhine’s left bank were annexed by France. Langenbach now lay in the Mairie ("Mayoralty") of Konken, the Canton of Kusel, the Arrondissement of Birkenfeld and the Department of Sarre. After French rule ended, Langenbach lay beginning in 1816 in the Baierischer Rheinkreis, a new exclave of the Kingdom of Bavaria created by the Congress of Vienna, and more locally in the Landkommissariat (later Bezirksamt and Landkreis or district) of Kusel, the Canton of Kusel and the Bürgermeisterei ("Mayoralty") of Konken. Thus, in the realm of local administration at least, nothing much had changed, and this structure remained in place until administrative restructuring in Rhineland-Palatinate in 1968. In the late 1920s and early 1930s, the Nazi Party (NSDAP) became quite popular in Langenbach. In the 1928 Reichstag elections, only 2.3% of the local votes went to Adolf Hitler’s party, but by the 1930 Reichstag elections, this had grown to 25.3%. By the time of the 1933 Reichstag elections, after Hitler had already seized power, local support for the Nazis had swollen to 88.0%. Hitler’s success in these elections paved the way for his Enabling Act of 1933 (Ermächtigungsgesetz), thus starting the Third Reich in earnest. In 1972, Langenbach passed as a self-administering Ortsgemeinde to the Verbandsgemeinde of Glan-Münchweiler.

=== Population development ===
Langenbach remained characterized mainly by agriculture until recent years, reflecting the villagers’ conservative attitude towards their way of living. Even in earlier days, though, there were workers in the nearby quarries and at the collieries and ironworks in the Saarland, and also those who worked for farms, which were often quite big. To most people living in the village nowadays, Langenbach is merely a residential community. Work is sought mainly in the Saarland and the nearby towns of Kaiserslautern and Kusel.

The following table shows population development over the centuries for Langenbach, with some figures broken down by religious denomination:

Year	1609	1825	1835	1871	1905	1939	1961	2003	2005	2007
Total	48	313	391	392	401	417	502	550	540	458
Catholic	–	19					11
Evangelical	48	294					491

=== Municipality’s name ===
In the municipality's name, the German word Bach ("brook") is joined with the adjective lang ("long") with a dative ending, likely reflecting an origin in some prepositional phrase such as am langen Bach ("on the long brook"), which may literally have originally meant a village on a long brook, or perhaps it meant that the village itself stretched for a long way along a brook. At various times, the historical records yield the forms Oberlangenbach and Niederlangenbach, which shows that there were once two centres here, side by side, with one lying upstream from the other (the prefixes mean "upper" and "lower" – or to use the English cognate, "nether"). Regional historical investigations have sometimes confused Langenbach with a place near Baumholder, nowadays officially known as Berglangenbach, while the Langenbach with which this article deals was formerly sometimes called Conken-Langenbach (using an archaic spelling of "Konken"). Among other things, this has thrown the year of first documentary mention into question. As author Helmut Weyrich from neighbouring Herchweiler pointed out, for instance, researchers Dolch and Greule give this date as 1385, when actually this may apply to Berglangenbach's first mention. The year given in this article, on the other hand, 1445-1446, certainly means the Langenbach discussed in this article.

=== Vanished villages ===
On an eastern slope south of the village centre, remnants of a settlement have been unearthed. It might have been an estate back in Gallo-Roman times.

== Religion ==
Langenbach lay in the Remigiusland, and thereby was originally subject to the lordship of the Bishopric of Reims, although within ecclesiastical organization, it belonged to the Archbishopric of Mainz. On the principle of cuius regio, eius religio, all the villagers in the time of the Reformation, about 1534, had to convert as required by the Duke first to Lutheranism, and then in 1588, on Count Palatine Johannes I's orders, everybody had to convert once again, this time to John Calvin’s Reformed teachings. After the Thirty Years' War, freedom of religion was theoretically in place, though people in Langenbach remained mostly Calvinist, or at least generally Protestant after the Protestant Union was formed out of the Lutheran and Calvinist churches in 1817. From the Middle Ages onwards, Langenbach dwellers were members of the Church of Konken. Only in 1954 did the village pass within the deaconry of Kusel to the newly founded parish of Herschweiler-Pettersheim. The Catholic Christians belong as a minority to the parish of Kusel.

=== Regular events ===
Langenbach holds its kermis (church consecration festival, locally known as the Kerwe) on the second Sunday in November, making it the last village in the Kusel district to do so each year. There is also the Brunnenfest ("Fountain Festival") in the summer. Well known are the Grün-Weißen-Nächte ("Green-White Nights") during Shrovetide (Fastnacht season). The village has no customs of its very own.

=== Clubs ===
Langenbach has the following clubs:

- Angelsportverein — angling club
- Gesangverein — singing club
- Flugsportverein Kusel — air sport club
- Landfrauenverein — countrywomen's club
- Pfälzische Bauern- und Winzerschaft — "Palatine Farmers’ and Winegrowers’ Association", Langenbach chapter
- Sportverein Langenbach e. V. — sport club
- Wasserfreunde Langenbach — swimming club

== Economy and infrastructure ==
=== Economic structure ===
Agriculture, which stood alone as Langenbach's predominant economic factor well into the 20th century, still plays an important rôle today, although now only a few of the villagers actually earn their livelihoods at it. Once serving as an important facility for supplying the local population was the mill. The Langenbacher Mühle was named as early as 1446 in a reckoning of accounts from the Oberamt of Lichtenberg (this is also reckoned to be Langenbach's first documentary mention, although sources differ), and there is the first Erbbestandsbrief (Erbbestand was a uniquely German landhold arrangement in which ownership rights and usage rights were separated; this is forbidden by law in modern Germany) from 1575. The mill crops up once again in the 1745 mill protocol, and towards the end of the 18th century, it was supposedly owned by a man named Jacob Benedum, who was for a time a member of Schinderhannes’s (Johannes Bückler’s) band of outlaws. The mill flourished even into the time after the Second World War, but in the course of the "great mill die-off", even the Langenbacher Mühle was eventually given up, sometime about 1955. It was later a children's home and a restaurant. Today it is a private house. Most people in the workforce must commute to jobs elsewhere, in Kusel, Kaiserslautern and the Saarland. A whole series of independent shops and businesses can be found in the village, two roofing businesses, one of which also builds wooden houses, a plastering and stuccoing business, a business that sells telecommunications systems, insurance agencies, a professional office for financing building projects, architects’ offices and a distillery. Otherwise, Langenbach is a residential community for people in the most varied of occupations. There may be certain opportunities in the future for tourism. The best known local business is the Ulrich distillery, which produces both grain-based industrial spirits and fruit schnapps made from local fruit.

=== Education ===
Beginning in the time of the Reformation, there were efforts to teach children everywhere to read and write and to do arithmetic, and first and foremost, to teach them Catechism. It was, however, a very long time before schools were established in every village. Langenbach’s "mother school" was at first the school in Konken, although as early as 1733, Langenbach built a schoolhouse on its own responsibility that was not supported by the government. At the time there were 19 taxpayers in the village and roughly 40 schoolchildren. Despite having its own school, the village remained as before dependent on Konken and still had to make contributions to maintain the school there and the schoolteacher. Several requests in the decades that followed to the government to establish the village's own, independent schooling came to naught, and thus in the 18th century, there was only winter school (a school geared towards an agricultural community's practical needs, held in the winter, when farm families had a bit more time to spare). Nevertheless, Langenbachers kept on maintaining their own school, for the way to school in Konken was quite far and also rather unpleasant. It became clear, though, that schoolteachers were not lining up to be hired to live and work in Langenbach. Several schoolteachers from the time before the French Revolution are known by name: Philipp Heinrich Collini from 1753 to 1762, Theobald Müller to 1779, Joh. Adam Müller to 1787, then a man named Rindt, and from 1792 once again J. A. Müller, who in 1795 was removed by the municipality. In 1828, a second schoolhouse was built on the spot occupied by the first one, which had now become inadequate to its purpose. A teacher's dwelling on its own plot of land was built across the road. In 1894, the municipality had a third schoolhouse built, with the teacher's dwelling built in. This building was given an imposing belltower. Beginning in 1938, the school was run as a Christian community school, and an eighth grade was added. In 1956, the school acquired a second class, so that the one-room schoolhouse now had to accommodate different classes in shifts. The next year, though, a second classroom was built onto the schoolhouse to deal with this newly arisen problem. In 1966, the upper grade levels were transferred to the new Mittelpunktschule ("midpoint school", a central school, designed to eliminate smaller outlying schools) in Herschweiler-Pettersheim, while for the time being, the four lowest grade levels stayed with schoolteacher Karlheinz Schultheiß in Langenbach. In 1970, this primary school, too, was dissolved. The classrooms were used for a few years after that by the Mittelpunktschule. As of 1980, though, the schoolhouse stood empty, and was converted into a village community centre. Today, primary school pupils attend school in Herschweiler-Pettersheim while Hauptschule students attend classes at the Regionale Schule Glan-Münchweiler. Kusel is the location of further schools, the vocational school and special schools.

=== Transport ===
Langenbach lies on Kreisstraßen 12 and 13, which link it with Landesstraße 350 and Bundesstraße 420. To the northeast runs the Autobahn A 62 (Kaiserslautern–Trier). The drive to the Autobahn interchange is at Kusel is roughly 6 km. The nearest station is Glan-Münchweiler station, which is on the Landstuhl–Kusel railway and is served by Regionalbahn service RB 67, called the Glantalbahn (the name of which refers to the Glan Valley Railway, which shared some of the route of the Landstuhl–Kusel line, including the former junction at Glan-Münchweiler). There are other stations in Kusel and Sankt Wendel.

==== Airfield ====
Langenbach has a special airfield run and used mainly by the Kusel air sport club. The grass landing strip has the orientation 10/28. The airfield can be reached by two-way radio with the identification "Kusel Segelflug" on 123.35 MHz. The airfield traffic pattern is flown either northwards or southwards.

== Politics ==
=== Municipal council ===
The council is made up of 8 council members, who were elected by majority vote at the municipal election held on 7 June 2009, and the honorary mayor as chairman.

=== Mayor ===
Langenbach's mayor is Wolfgang Schneider.

=== Coat of arms ===
The municipality's arms might be described thus: Argent in base water of the same upon which ground with grass proper upon which a stag statant grazing gules unguled and attired Or.

The model for this composition is a 1740 court seal. The arms have been borne since 1970 when they were approved by the now defunct Rheinhessen-Pfalz Regierungsbezirk administration in Neustadt an der Weinstraße.
