= Herschweiler-Pettersheim =

- Municipality
- Coat of arms

- Location of Herschweiler-Pettersheim within Kusel district
- Interactive map of Herschweiler-Pettersheim
- Location within Germany Location within Rhineland-Palatinate
- Coordinates: 49°28′37″N 7°20′59″E
- Country: Germany
- State: Rhineland-Palatinate
- District: Kusel
- Municipal assoc.: Oberes Glantal

Government
  - Mayor (2019–24): Margot Schillo

Area
  - Total: 7.47 km^{2} (2.88 sq mi)
- Elevation: 370 m (1,210 ft)

Population (2025-12-31)
  - Total: 1,268
  - Density: 170/km^{2} (440/sq mi)
- Time zone: UTC+01:00 (CET)
  - Summer (DST): UTC+02:00 (CEST)
- Postal codes: 66909
- Dialling codes: 06384
- Vehicle registration: KUS
- Website: www.herschweiler-pettersheim.de

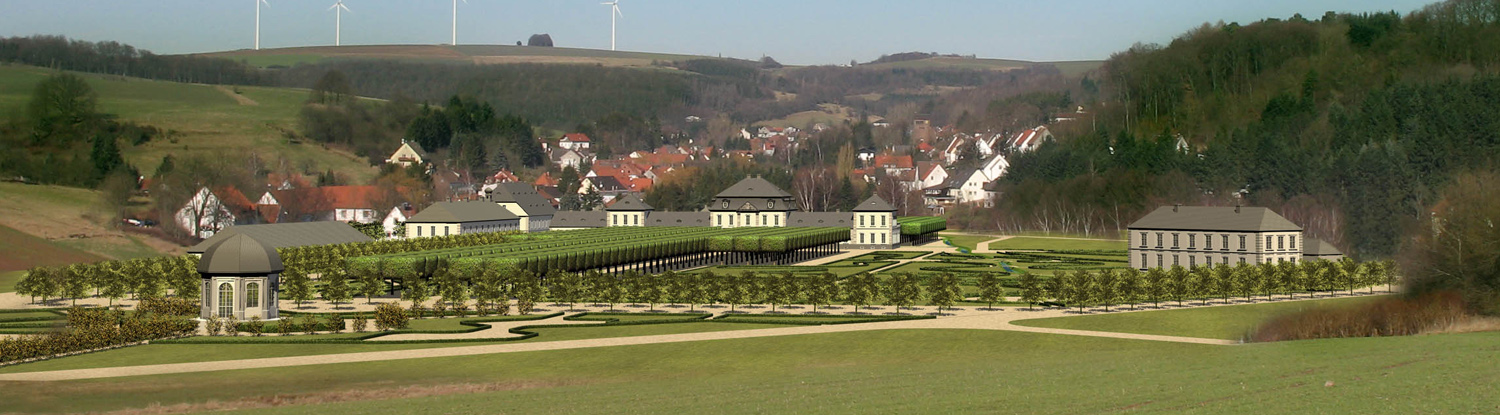
Hunting lodge as it would look in Herschweiler-Pettersheim if it still stood today

Herschweiler-Pettersheim is an Ortsgemeinde – a municipality belonging to a Verbandsgemeinde, a kind of collective municipality – in the Kusel district in Rhineland-Palatinate, Germany. It belongs to the Verbandsgemeinde of Oberes Glantal.

== Geography ==
=== Location ===
Herschweiler-Pettersheim lies in the Western Palatinate in the upper Ohmbach valley, which forks to the northwest into the Langenbach valley and to the northeast into the Klingelbach hollow. At the fork, the Harzhöhe climbs from 275 m above sea level to a 372 m-high sloping terrace and onwards to an elevation of 412 m above sea level at the top. Because it is so windswept, four wind turbines were installed on the mountaintop in late 2001. The village's own elevation is 274 m above sea level. As part of the North Palatine Uplands, the local natural environment is characterized by an extraordinarily intricately compartmentalized relief. It is marked by the constant alternation between jagged mountains and heights with sharply convex slopes west of the Ohmbach and less sharply convex slopes east thereof, along with relatively great topographic variance. Herschweiler-Pettersheim is the most populous municipality in the Verbandsgemeinde of Glan-Münchweiler. The municipal area measures 747 ha, of which 203 ha is wooded.

=== Geology ===
Geologically, Herschweiler-Pettersheim lies on layers of lower rotliegend, in particular the Middle Kusel Group (ruk2), which is made up mainly of sandstones and arkoses along with siltstones, claystones and conglomerates. There are also limestone deposits, which were once quarried at a mine on the Bockhof as well as at the lime kiln on Landesstraße 350. The lower rotliegend soils are as a rule sandy-loamy to loamy-clayey with clayey-marly bits, as well as being deeply and amply aerated. Thus the plateaux and flat slopes are used as cropland (244 ha), the expanses in the dale and the damp as well as steeper and sunny slopes as hay meadows, grazing land or meadow orchards (all together 179 ha of grassland), and the stony mountain ridges, the pathless, steep slopes and gorges for forestry (95.7 ha municipal woodland and 99.4 ha private woodland). The 437 m-high Hühnerkopf, the predominant peak in the mountain ridge east of the village is a butte formed by a subvolcanic intrusion. The sill formed until 1972 the basis for the local hard-stone industry.

=== Neighbouring municipalities ===
Herschweiler-Pettersheim borders in the north on the municipality of Konken, in the east on the municipality of Wahnwegen, in the southeast on the municipality of Steinbach am Glan, in the south on the municipality of Ohmbach, in the west on the municipality of Krottelbach and in the northwest on the municipality of Langenbach.

=== Municipality's layout ===
Until the end of the Second World War in 1945, Herschweiler-Pettersheim's built-up area stretched mainly along both sides of the thoroughfare, Landesstraße 350, west of the Ohmbach. From the village's north end (280 m above sea level) to the former fire station at the crossing of Landesstraßen 350 and 352 in the south (269 m above sea level), the village has a length of more than 1.75 km, and if the distance to the way out of the village at the Bockhof is counted, this rises to more than 2.5 km. Until the mid 20th century, Herschweiler-Pettersheim was a typical linear village (by some definitions, a "thorpe"), and one of the longest villages in the Kusel district. As early as then, however, the side dales branching off the Ohmbach to the west were already settled up to about 200 m in, the Kerb valley in "die Hohl", the "Gigum" in the Geilbach valley and the old Ducal road (Herzogstraße) in the Ehrsbach valley, which in feudal times led from Schloss Pettersheim over the heights towards the Oster valley to Zweibrücken. East of the Ohmbach, the built-up area reached thinly up the old Konker Straße ("Konken Road"). Good conditions for building houses and commercial buildings together with springs were found there in a sheltered location at the dale's edge, which was rich in groundwater, on both sides of the old road link through to today's Kreisstraße 20 towards Wahnwegen. Sewer-laying work about 1980 unearthed a layered log road about one metre deep under the roadway that had been used as a link between the residential areas "in der Hohl" and "Im Eck" in Herschweiler's old village core across the wet and marshy Ohmbach valley floor. There was even expansion not far from Schloss Pettersheim on a road link across the dale linking two roads running through the heights. This link led to a Waldecke ("forest corner") on the Hühnerkopf, and then onwards to the Roman road east of Wahnwegen. In this part of the village, formerly known as Walleck, and nowadays as Wallheck (both derived from Waldecke), with its houses set at odd angles to each other and its maze of lanes, one can still make out the original layout of the place despite all the conversions and modernization. The agricultural homesteads on the Bockhof were built at a U-shaped valley, the "Kirschen-Grund" ("Cherry Ground"), which ends here, and on today's Landesstraße 352. After the Second World War with its great loss of male inhabitants (67 had fallen in the war and 29 had gone missing from a village of 1,100 inhabitants; in the First World War, 24 had fallen), the economic downturn, the Allied occupation and currency depreciation came a time of general, lively building activity once the Wirtschaftswunder had begun and the prisoners of war had come home (the last one came home in 1950). Thus, the parts of the village had fully grown together and also grown in breadth. Parallel to Hauptstraße ("Main Street") after the war, a linking roadway within the municipality, later known as Kirchenstraße ("Church Street"), was built up as far as the location of the Evangelical church. The church itself was built in 1953 and 1954 at an exposed spot east of the Ohmbach in the highest part of the village core. Moreover, a new building zone filled in the gap between Bockhof and Pettersheim. On the riverside flats in 1973, the company Chalou GmbH built a clothing factory. Gaps on Bockhofstraße were also filled. A new building zone called Buchrech opened east of the church as the beginning of a new residential neighbourhood along a second street running parallel to Hauptstraße, at mid-slope up the Hühnerkopf's west flank. Yet another new building zone called "Am Hühnerrech" reaching to Seitersstraße, followed, which has since 2003 been growing to the east into the countryside. For urban growth, this is a very questionable development both because of the spillover into residential land, the demographic development and the high land consumption on the one hand and because of the threatening degradation of the village core on the other. The people who originally lived on the village thoroughfare move away from the core and settle towards the edge of the village in a pleasant neighbourhood, just as happens in other villages, leaving the houses along the thoroughfare empty and unused. In 2003, six houses in the Upper Village (Oberdorf) alone stood empty. Further houses will follow owing to the population's age structure. An older, empty pair of semi-detached houses next door to the inn "Zum Hirschen" were torn down in 2003. Even in the village centre, a former big department store that had sold clothing and food had to give way to today's village square. Despite stagnating and declining population growth, the built-up area's outer edge, and the village's street, watermain and sewer networks are all being expanded, which could have major consequences for later generations. For this reason, renewal of the inner village might be more important than opening new building zones on former meadows. As early as the time between 1960 and 1980, many houses in Herschweiler-Pettersheim had floors added and thereby were made more suitable to the demand for more living space. Even the graveyard laid out in the Geilbach valley in 1839 has had to be repeatedly expanded. Since the sporting ground built in 1928 in the "Wallheck" also served the municipality as a fairground in the years after the war, a new one was built specially for the village's sport club in the years 1955-1957 in the "Wallhecksdell". A new clubhouse with changing cubicles and a room for business was dedicated in 1967. Work on a new grass playing field was begun in 1975. Owing to improper grading, the project met with great and long-lasting problems with landslides, such that the grass playing field could only be dedicated in 1984. The masses of earth that had slid down the slope, which had even shoved the forest floor, complete with trees, ahead of them, had to be removed to the edge of the village.

== History ==
=== Antiquity ===
According to Dr. Karlwerner Kaiser, formerly of Speyer Archaeological Monument Care (Archäologische Denkmalpflege Speyer), knowledge and archaeological finds thus far gathered for the area within Herschweiler-Pettersheim's limits give no clue to any time before the 3rd or 4th century BC. The oldest find witnessed to date has been a bronze disk neckring. The still unknown recovery site is presumably a worn-down barrow from the 4th century BC. The find may well point to a Celtic estate, perhaps a "knightly estate", in the Ohmbach valley. Somewhat more than 200 years less old is a find consisting of a Celtic coin, which came from an unknown spot within municipal limits. It could bear witness, as a buried artifact from a settlement in the "later, pre-Christian Bronze Age" of the 1st or 2nd century BC, to a source in the floor of the dale or on the Ohmbach valley's slopes. It could somehow be linked to an ancient road that ran through the dale. Eventually, the digs at the Roman-era villa rustica on Seitersstraße in 1961 led to the unearthing of ceramics from a settlement of the "later, pre-Christian Iron Age" right near the Roman site. This points to a yet-to-be-unearthed Celtic estate at this spot dating from the 1st century BC, a forerunner to the already known Roman estate, which was built of stone. A Celtic settlement in the Ohmbach valley around today's Herschweiler-Pettersheim from the 3rd or 4th century BC melding into Roman times in the Palatinate is the picture that emerges from this. Even the name "Hühnerkopf", borne by the peak that looms over the village to the east, can be traced to the description Hünenkopf (or in Middle High German, Hunnenkopf – that is, "Hun's Head", whereas the modern form means "Chicken's Head") and is therefore a linguistic clue as to an ancient population and its particular connection with the mountain. The building of the villa rustica from Roman times after the beginning of the Christian Era on a graded layer of débris, unearthed in the years 1959-1961, in which building remnants and potsherds were found, proves that in the 2nd century AD, a great wooden building with clay-filled timber framing once stood at the spot, but later burnt down before being replaced by the Roman complex. The ceramics unearthed 30 m behind the villa rustica show that there was a Celtic settlement tradition from the "later, pre-Christian Iron Age" into what was locally Roman times, lasting into the latter half of the 3rd century AD. After the Germanic invasions and the villa's destruction in the late 3rd century, it is believed that the local area was not settled, and that virgin forest once again sprouted up on the site.

=== Middle Ages ===
About 400, Germanic peoples had already conquered great parts of the Roman provinces in Western Europe. From the north, Salian Franks thrust through the Wetterau to the west. In the disagreements among the princes of the various Frankish clans, Clovis, a prince of the Merovingian line, rose above others as the victor, making himself autocrat and King of the Franks. In 486, he defeated the last Roman proconsul, thus ending the Roman era in Gaul, and incorporating this into the Frankish kingdom. However, he soon found himself in a dispute over the newly won land with the Alemanni. In a decisive battle in 506 near Strasbourg, Clovis, finding himself in the greatest need, vowed to convert to Christianity if only he could be the victor over the Alemanni. He won. Then, together with more than 3,000 warriors, Clovis had himself baptized by the Bishop of Reims, Saint Remigius, and also appointed head and protector of the Frankish Church. A later Frankish king, in the 6th or 7th century – possibly Childebert II sometime between 575 and 590 – brought about the separation of the Remigiusland from the Königsland and its transfer to the Bishopric of Reims, thus making the Abbey of Saint-Remi in Reims the landholder of the Remigiusland, within which lay what is now Herschweiler-Pettersheim's municipal area, albeit right near the border. The tightly organized Frankish Empire grew bit by bit, particularly under Charlemagne (785-814), into Europe's greatest power. Eventually in 1024, Conrad II achieved kingship and also the Imperial crown, which the Salians had held for more than 100 years. Besides instituting Counts Palatine or Königsburgen ("King's Castles"), he divided the empire up into Gaue and hundreds and enfeoffed certain men as counts. The Schloss known to later history has its beginnings as far back as this time. According to the Salm-Kyrburg archivist Georg Friedrich Schott von Pettersheim in his work about the Nahegau, it was built at the beginning of "fist law" (the law of the stronger, or "might makes right") and was fortified with walls and moats. Since "fist law" (Faustrecht in German) goes back to the 11th century, and since a Konken parish record says that Count Emrich von Nahegau had owned Kusel and ascribed to his son, Gerlach I, both Kusel and Schloß Pettersheim (the castle/palace in question) in the Vogtei of Remigiusberg in 1030, it can be inferred that the Schloss was built in the 11th century. One of the mightiest Gaue was the Nahegau, to which Herschweiler-Pettersheim belonged. As Vögte, the counts also had the duty of protecting the Remigiusland as an ecclesiastical landhold, but they now sought to take it over for themselves. The opportunity to pass fiefs on and thereby become overlords themselves, and the right to bequeath the fief with which they had once been enfeoffed, led to a break between overlord and fiefholders, enhancing the counts' power and independence. This was also so for the comital family of the Emichones, who until 1110 were lords in the Nahegau. When the last gaugrave ("Gau count"), Emich, died, the divisions began:

- about 1113, his son Emich founded the House of the Waldgraves;
- about 1134, his brother Gerlach made himself independent and named his county after Castle Veldenz (thus, the County of Veldenz) near Bernkastel-Kues;
- about 1140, the family of the Raugraves arose.

These three comital families in the former Nahegau existed until the end of the Middle Ages and characterized the region's history, especially with their frequent disagreements, hereditary divisions, pledgings and changes of ownership. The Veldenz share of the Nahegau spread out in 1134 to, among other things, the Vogtei over the holdings of the Abbey of Saint-Remi, and thus also into the Remigiusland. Serving the first count, Gerlach von Veldenz, as a seat was at first a castle in the Nahe valley. Later, Meisenheim was raised to residence town. When the fifth count of Veldenz, Count Gerlach V, unexpectedly died in 1259 he left a young wife, who soon thereafter gave birth to a daughter, Agnes, ending the male line of Counts of Veldenz who had descended from the Emichones. Gerlach V's surviving kin coveted this now apparently "lordless" holding. Above all, it was Waldgrave Emicho, who as a descendant of the old Veldenz comital family, sought to make good his claims to the Oberamt of Lichtenberg, and he would likely have succeeded, likely even resorting to violence, in bringing it into his ownership, had Count Henry II of Zweibrücken, Agnes's grandfather and regent, not known how to defend his young granddaughter's hereditary claims. He hurriedly had several wooden castles built on mountains and in dales. It is likely that Castle Petersheim owes its beginnings to this emergency situation. If it did not exist before 1258, then it might have been founded between 1258 and 1260 and tasked with protecting the upper Ohmbach valley and the local villages from a raid. The castle, which was later expanded to a moated castle complex, was surely a well chosen and well fortified strong point from which the roads could be observed and the area secured and defended. These efforts were successful, for in the end, the Waldgrave acknowledged young Agnes's hereditary rights.

Through Agnes's marriage to the Hohengeroldseck knight Sir Heinrich of Geroldseck, who took over the regency as Count Heinrich I of Veldenz, the County of Veldenz underwent a change in dynasty without actually changing its name. Heinrich's son Georg I was followed in 1347 by Heinrich II, whose sons Heinrich III and Friedrich II began joint rule of Veldenz' holdings in 1378. On 23 April 1387, these were divided between the brothers in a document that also gives Castle Petersheim its first documentary mention, describing it as a small, moated castle. Heinrich III acquired, among other things, the Castle, while Friedrich II was guaranteed its use in times of need.

In 1393, the county returned to a single ruler under Frederick III, Count of Veldenz. His only child and heir, Anna of Veldenz, by her 1409 marriage to Stephen, Count Palatine of Simmern-Zweibrücken, Duke of Bavaria and Count Palatine of the Rhine (son of prince-elector Rupert, King of Germany), set the county on a path leading to its transfer to Stephen in 1444, when Friedrich III died. Stephen, combining his lands, created the new County Palatine of Zweibrücken, which in the fullness of time came to be known as the Duchy of Palatinate-Zweibrücken, and which included both Herschweiler and Pettersheim. In the 15th century, vassals were enfeoffed with the castle. Beginning in 1539, though, after modifications by Duchess Elisabeth, widow of Louis II, Count Palatine of Zweibrücken, it became her widow's seat. After further conversions by Elisabeth's daughter-in-law Anna of Hesse, it became her abode. The Schultheißen of the Amt of Konken, too, lived at the Schloss.

=== Modern times ===
Beginning about the 17th century, the Schloss served the Dukes of Palatinate-Zweibrücken as a hunting lodge. The oldest preserved record of a hunt in Pettersheim dates from 1608.

To understand the broader events in the region during the Thirty Years' War (1613–1648), what must first be known is the historical background: While the Holy Roman Emperor was losing power in the High Middle Ages, the prince-electors' might was growing. Within their electoral states, they had absolute power. The Protestant Prince-Electors in particular wholly broke away from the Emperor's power, so that two denominationally oriented camps formed, in 1608 the Protestant Union and in 1609 the Catholic League. Palatinate-Zweibrücken for the time being remained neutral, although it militantly fought the Reformation's ideas. When in the seemingly everlasting struggle between Protestants and Catholics the Archbishop of Prague had a Protestant church torn down, the upshot was the 1618 Defenestration of Prague, which started a religious war. The Bohemian Protestants, who rejected the new Emperor, Ferdinand II, chose Protestant Elector Palatine Friedrich V as their king (the "Winter King"). Bohemian and Palatine troops, however, were defeated in a counterattack by Imperial troops and Friedrich V had to flee into exile. The Emperor then granted the now vacant Palatine Electoral throne to the Bavarian Duke Maximilian I. His general, Tilly, conquered great parts of the Palatinate in 1620 and forced the subjects to embrace Catholicism. Spanish and Italian troops, who fought on the Emperor's side, also conquered parts of the Palatinate, likewise in 1620, and did not distinguish between the Electorate of the Palatinate and the Duchy of Palatinate-Zweibrücken. Thus it was not much use that John II, who had taken over the job of governing in Heidelberg since Friedrich V had left for Prague, wanted to declare Palatinate-Zweibrücken a neutral state. The troops went through the region, plundering, in 1620, exacting food from the local people.

Over two thousand years, the Westrich, an historic region that encompasses areas in both Germany and France, was a continual invasion route for foreign troops. This continued during this period when the Protestant resistance was broken, and foreign powers intervened to save Protestantism. Count Palatine John II eventually gave up his neutrality and allied himself with Swedish King Gustav II Adolf. The combined forces, although without Gustav II Adolf (for he had been killed at the Battle of Lützen in 1632, despite having been on the winning side), advanced on southern Germany in 1633. When they were beaten at the Battle of Nördlingen in 1634 and forced to withdraw, they brought death and depravity to the Glan area in 1635. Croatian mercenaries in the Imperial army advanced up the Glan by way of Meisenheim, Kusel and Sankt Wendel and grimly laid waste to the area. Kaiserslautern, Kusel and Zweibrücken were utterly destroyed and burnt down. The same fate was visited upon Konken with its church. The already thoroughly plundered and forsaken villages were also utterly destroyed.

No further records come from Herschweiler or Pettersheim from this time. Some villages never rose again, such as Reisweiler, a place north of Herschweiler. Supposedly in the whole Oberamt of Lichtenberg, only one cow was left. Anyone who survived the Croats' onslaught fell victim to either hunger or the Plague. Those who were left had to feed themselves on roots and tree leaves, mostly without bread, and sometimes even eating dogs and cats. Sometimes they were even driven to cannibalism. John II fled ahead of the Siege of Zweibrücken and went into exile in Metz in 1635, dying there later that same year. The union of the Swedes, who were likewise marauding through the Duchy of Palatinate-Zweibrücken robbing and murdering, with the French extended the war by more than a decade, although Emperor Ferdinand III was by then advocating peace. Only when the peace negotiations of Münster and Osnabrück had begun in 1644 did the Imperial troops end their nine-year occupation and withdraw. Only now did Duke Friedrich (1616-1661), who had stayed in Metz, like his late father (succeeding him upon his death in 1635, far from Palatinate-Zweibrücken), dare return to Zweibrücken, nominally nine years after becoming Duke, and take over the task of government. It was a few more years before the Peace of Westphalia was concluded in 1648. After Friedrich's return from exile in Metz in 1644 and with the confirmation of Zweibrücken's privileges and freedoms early in 1642, the country's reconstruction began. Because Zweibrücken had been destroyed, Friedrich moved into the old residence at Meisenheim, which had been mostly spared the war's ravages. The physically handicapped Duke showed much goodwill, though war debt weighed heavily on the country. The situation only got better when his successor, Frederick Louis, Count Palatine of Zweibrücken, who inherited a great bequest from his mother, became Duke from 1661 to 1681. At last the reconstruction forged ahead. From various parts of Germany and, foremost, from Switzerland, newcomers began settling in the Duchy's domains, which the war had left almost empty of people. The only families that came back after the Thirty Years' War, in 1670 (22 years after the war had ended) were the families Veith, Schneider and Scherer in Herschweiler's case and the families Trapp and Maurer in Pettersheim's. In Palatinate-Zweibrücken government counsel David König's 1677 description of the Pettersheim "castle", the following was reported: "The Pettersheim house is a small house, lies in a quagmire and is surrounded by a moat, has no appurtenances and only a Schultheiß lives there, can sometimes serve as a refuge." From 1672 onwards, French "Sun King" Louis XIV waged several wars of conquest against German princes with a view to expanding his kingdom's borders. During one such war, the Franco-Dutch War, 58 villages in the Amt of Lichtenburg were burnt down. Meeting the same fate in 1677 were thirty buildings in Kusel. Beginning in 1680, Louis began his Politique des Réunions, in the hopes of bringing Palatinate-Zweibrücken, too, into his ownership. When Duke Frederick Louis opposed this, he was declared to be out of line, and French troops once more marched into the Duchy. Frederick Louis became ill and died in 1681 at Schloss Landsberg (castle) near Obermoschel. Like Frederick III of Veldenz before him, Frederick Louis died without a male heir, and the new dynasty turned out to be the Swedish royal family, who were a branch of the late Duke's family. Thus, King Charles XI of Sweden was awarded the titles of Count Palatine of Zweibrücken and Duke of Bavaria.

King Charles XI never visited his County Palatine. The job of ruling what now amounted to a Swedish exclave was delegated to Christian II, Count Palatine of Zweibrücken-Birkenfeld (a Zweibrücken sideline). He ruled from 1681 to 1693, whereafter the County Palatine lay in Charlotta Friederike's hands; she was the late Friedrich Ludwig's youngest daughter, who had returned from exile in Lorraine in 1664. She was married to Duke Frederick Louis' son, who died young. In difficult times, she ruled the Duchy from Meisenheim with great prudence. From 1688 to 1697, King Louis XIV once again overran the Electorate of the Palatinate and parts of Palatinate-Zweibrücken in the Nine Years' War (known in Germany as the War of the Palatine Succession) to further his inheritance claims on his sister-in-law's behalf. She was Elizabeth Charlotte, Princess Palatine, also known as Liselotte. It did not matter either way to the Swedish king whether he held the County Palatine as a German fief or a French one. When King Charles XI died in 1697, he was succeeded by his son, Charles XII of Sweden. The year 1697 brought the Treaty of Ryswick, under whose terms Louis XIV had to forgo many of his conquests. Palatinate-Zweibrücken was awarded to the Swedes, though Charles XII never actually laid eyes on it. Nevertheless, he did decree programmes aimed at furthering agriculture and schooling. Even in the countryside, there was stress on furthering schooling. Under Swedish influence, ecclesiastical development was set on new paths. In 1718 at the Siege of Fredriksten, a fortress at Fredrikshald in Norway (now called Halden), King Karl XII was shot dead (there is some question as to whether it was an enemy gunshot or an assassin's bullet). Since he was unwed and had no children, his sister took over the task of governing. She was not, however, allowed to succeed her brother in his capacity of Count Palatine (Duke) of Zweibrücken. Thus, the County Palatine in Germany passed to the sideline of Palatinate-Kleeburg, with Charles XII's first successor here being his cousin, named Gustav Samuel Leopold, an officer in the Emperor's service who may have converted to Catholicism for his master's sake. While Herschweiler-Pettersheim may have been important enough to have a palace in its skyline in the 17th and 18th centuries, according to a 1704 report, the castle, Schloss Pettersheim, was old, small and in disrepair, and had no more than two or three rooms.

During the time of Duke Gustav's rule (1718-1731), the castle, on which major conversion work was done in 1725, together with the two villages of Herschweiler and Pettersheim with all their income that in any way has anything to do with the inhabitants, passed – in defiance of Duke Wolfgang's will – as a patrilineal fief to the privy councillor, chief hunting councillor and chief court councillor Johann Heinrich von Hoffmann, in return for military service. Herschweiler's and Pettersheim's inhabitants were then beholden to this new lord as his subjects. The family Hoffmann at the Zweibrücker Hof, though highly regarded, nevertheless fell into disrepute for theft on the night of the Duke's death. After the Countess Hoffmann, who had wed her husband even before his divorce from his first wife, died, the patrilineal fief passed back to the Duchy of Palatinate-Zweibrücken. Since Duke Gustav died childless, the Duchy's leadership passed upon his death in 1731 to Count Palatine Christian III of the sideline of Palatinate-Birkenfeld. Christian III, who was Duke Wolfgang's great-grandson, despite his good relations with the French royal house, remained a loyal evangelical Christian (that is to say, Protestant). Indeed, denominational questions delayed recognition of his succession by three years, until 1734, where after he ruled for only one more year, dying in 1735. Since his son, Duke Christian IV was only 13 years old at the time when his father died, his mother Caroline, served as regent for him and ran the Duchy.

In 1742, Christian IV himself took over the task of governing. Mindful of the succession in the Electorate of the Palatinate and Electorate of Bavaria, he decided to convert to Catholicism. Christian IV tended to his subjects' wellbeing, making improvements in the religious, social and legal sectors as well as in education and agriculture. He had the old Schloss Pettersheim torn down and on the same spot arose a hunting lodge of palatial proportions, with great garden complexes, elaborately laid out by either the Swedish Baroque architect Jonas Erikson Sundahl or, with Sundahl's collaboration, the Paris architect Pierre Patte (1723-1814). This new, statelier complex was built in the years 1759-1768 as a secondary residence. When dysentery broke out in Zweibrücken in the autumn of 1763, Christian IV fled with his family to the new palace, work on which was not yet finished.

The palace in Pettersheim served as the starting point for coursing hunts. Here, too, arose the court chapel with works by concertmaster Ernst Eicher, and court painter Mannlich also worked here. Schloss Pettersheim became such a favourite second home for the Duke, alongside Schloss Jägersburg, that even his favourite nephew, Prince Maximilian Joseph, later the first King of Bavaria (as Maximilian I Joseph), who was brought up at his uncle's court, spent part of his youth in Pettersheim. Christian IV also had the Fronbotenlinie (a trail whose name means, roughly, "bailiff's line") which had existed since 1666, and which led from Zweibrücken by way of Herschweiler-Pettersheim to Meisenheim, expanded into a road after 1750, and sometimes running on it between 1772 and 1794, in Zweibrücken's service, were six-seat wagonettes. On the night of 5 November 1775, the Duke died at his secondary residence in Herschweiler-Pettersheim of pneumonia.

Christian IV, who had been illegitimately married to a dancer named Marianne Camasse of the Mannheim Theatre who had been raised to nobility and been given the title Countess Forbach, was succeeded not by one of his sons, but rather by his nephew Charles II August. The new Duke generally neglected Schloss Pettersheim, and in the local speech, he was disdainfully called "Hundskarl" (Hund being the German word for "dog"). For his Ducal hunts, he had great stalls built for the hounds and the 200 horses, but on the other hand, he neglected the palatial residence in Herschweiler-Pettersheim because he chose to live at Karlsberg Castle near Homburg, which he had had built. The time of his rule fell in the last decades before the French Revolution, and he fled in 1793 ahead of the French Revolutionary troops into exile in Mannheim, where he died two years later.

==== Recent times ====
On the morning of 11 March 1793, a group of some 50 French horsemen appeared, stalling their horses in the Ducal palace in Herschweiler-Pettersheim. The soldiers began by plundering the palace. Later the same day came a further troupe of French cavalry, who wanted to seize what was left of the hay. In the course of the earlier half of 1793, the French troops were forced out again, only to begin advancing once more in July. On 24 July 1793, the Revolutionary troops arrived once again in Pettersheim, and once again thoroughly plundered the palace and ruined it. Shortly before this happened, the Pettersheim Burgvogt (castle administrator), Etienne, had had everything that was kept in the palace that was of any great value – worth all together 4,608 Rhenish guilders – taken to safety in Kastellaun in the Hunsrück, and had quickly set up a makeshift watch on the palace made up of a couple of invalids, before he himself had fled to Zell on the Moselle. "Lowlifes" from Herschweiler and Pettersheim took part several times in the plundering. The six suspects, the discharged soldier who had been in service at the palace, Heinrich Frey, his wife, his daughter, Katharina Großklos, Susanne Knapp and Georg Heß (all from Pettersheim) were arrested during the French troops' temporary pullback and were interrogated in Kaiserslautern by Prussian troops. They confessed and were incarcerated for two years at the Dilsberg stronghold near Heidelberg. Heinrich Frey died during his sentence, while the other five were released on 14 April 1795. Christian Etienne had in the meantime returned from exile a second time only to find the whole palace, along with his own dwelling, plundered and utterly destroyed, and wanted to have the damage repaired. The French agent, Haupt, however, allowed several townsmen from Kusel to take the bricks from the stable in 1796. Thereafter, wood and bricks were constantly being stolen, leading Etienne to decide that same year to auction various stables, kennels and coachhouses off on 18 March 1796 to be torn down for their building materials, to prevent the last usable buildings from being illegally broken up and carted off by the local people. What was left after that of the former Duchy of Palatinate-Zweibrücken hunting lodge was likewise auctioned off a few years later by the French, after they had declared it national property. The palace's lands were also sold off in 1810. All that remains of the complex now is a few converted pieces of building.

Early in 1794, the French were pushed back by Prussian troops, but by October 1794, the lands on the Rhine's left bank were back in French hands. From the 1797 Treaty of Campo Formio, under whose terms Austria recognized the Rhine as France's border, until the time when Napoleon was driven out in 1814, Herschweiler and Pettersheim belonged for more than 15 years to France. After the annexation of the lands on the Rhine's left bank by the French Revolutionary government, the Revolutionary state brought a territorial reorganization into force. The already defunct Duchy of Palatinate-Zweibrücken was formally dissolved along with the old feudal order. Also abolished were tithes and all other feudal levies. But of course, the French then levied their own taxes. Lordly and ecclesiastical property were confiscated and auctioned off to private citizens. In administration and law, there were far-reaching changes and innovations, many of which lasted well beyond the time of French rule. The church register lost its status as an authoritative record of people's status, and instead a state register was introduced.

Self-administration of municipalities as it is still known today in Germany had its roots in the mairies ("mayoralties") that were established in French times. Herschweiler and Pettersheim now belonged to the Mairie of Conken, the Canton of Cousel, the Arrondissement of Birkenfeld and the Department of Sarre, whose seat was at Trier. Every village received its adjoint ("assistant"). Meanwhile, Maximilian Joseph I's homeland, Bavaria, had been made into a kingdom in 1806 and Maximilian himself had become king, at Napoleon's pleasure, as a reward for having supported Napoleon in his war against Austria in the foregoing year. After Napoleon was driven out in 1814 and the Congress of Vienna had brought about a further territorial reorganization the following year, Herschweiler and Pettersheim passed to the Baierischer Rheinkreis (whose seat was at Speyer), later known as Rheinpfalz or Rhenish Palatinate, but by any name, it was a territory that the Congress had awarded to Bavaria. At the lower level of administration, the two villages belonged to the Bürgermeisterei ("Mayoralty") of Konken, the Canton of Kusel and the Landkommissariat (later Bezirksamt and then Kreis or district) of Kusel. Wollenweber was the first mayor under Bavarian rule. From 1818, the mayoralty bore the name Herschweiler, although there was no office building there, nor apparently anywhere. Municipal officials took files home with them. Mayors were now chosen by municipal councils for five-year terms and then confirmed by the Bavarian government. Serving as mayor was an unpaid job, but the mayor got to wear, as an outward sign of his worthiness, a silver medallion on a light blue ribbon around his neck showing the effigy of the reigning Bavarian king on the obverse and the mayoralty's name on the reverse. Among the mayor's other obligations was keeping the civil register. Court was held in Kusel, the seat of the Landkommissariat. Responsible for taxation were three taxation offices. These were as of 1818, by order from the government in Munich, in Kusel, Ulmet and Herschweiler. The one in Herschweiler was responsible for the Bürgermeistereien of Herschweiler and Niederkirchen. That this office could also have been "Konken" from 1849 to 1894 shows up clearly in the tax collectors' attempt to have their place of residence made into their place of business as well. In 1900, though, the Bavarian government confirmed that Herschweiler was the office's permanent seat, and in so doing it may also have laid down the principle of a government office's area of responsibility not necessarily having anything to do with the civil servants' place of residence. Only in 1938, during the Third Reich, did the taxation zone get smaller, when the upper Oster valley was assigned to Sankt Wendel. There was an obvious rivalry during the 19th century between Herschweiler-Pettersheim and Konken over the right to be the mayor's "residence town". It even led to the municipalities of Konken, Albessen and Herchweiler splitting away from the Bürgermeisterei of Herschweiler-Pettersheim in 1905 and forming their own administrative entities. Out of the Ducal Schultheißerei of the Amt of Konken at the old palace at Pettersheim had now arisen a mayoralty and a municipal taxation office in Herschweiler-Pettersheim, and both offices remained there until 1972. Thus, for almost 400 years, Herschweiler-Pettersheim could play an important role in local administration and it did the village good. It had, compared to neighbouring villages, many facilities, such as post, constabulary and doctor, and by 1890 it was already a cultural hub. In the course of administrative restructuring in Rhineland-Palatinate after the Second World War, there was a thorough reorganization of the new state, and in the Kusel district, seven new Verbandsgemeinden were founded, thus putting an end to the long tradition of Herschweiler-Pettersheim being an administrative centre. Since this time, Herschweiler-Pettersheim has belonged, along with the municipalities of Börsborn, Glan-Münchweiler, Henschtal, Hüffler, Krottelbach, Langenbach, Matzenbach, Nanzdietschweiler, Quirnbach, Rehweiler, Steinbach am Glan and Wahnwegen to the Verbandsgemeinde of Glan-Münchweiler, into whose administrative structure the old mayoralty and taxation office have merged. The village does, however, still have importance as the district's most populous municipality.

Today, all that is left of the Schloss is converted parts of the building. Among these is the semi-detached Hirsch/Aulenbacher house, which belonged in 1817 to the forester Gasko, and which was offered for auction on 23 September 1817 in the Kaiserslautern gazette. According to that announcement, the two-floor house had seven rooms, one hall, two lofts, a cellar, a big barn, big stables, a forecourt and a garden. It even noted that the house could be used for any trade, particularly as a brewery or a tannery, standing as it did on the main road and at a brook. There is also another house whose southern half was part of the Schloss, namely, it is believed, a linking wing between two main buildings. In its garden are foundations of the old Schloss. Furthermore, the odd stone with carved relief can still be found. They were used to build houses after the Schloss had been auctioned. The local population is hardly aware anymore of this history. Herschweiler-Pettersheim's younger generation knows almost nothing about the Schloss; it is utterly unknown to youngsters in neighbouring villages.

=== Population development ===
For centuries, agriculture defined people's daily life and characterized the village's image. To this day, the three-layer structure of large, medium and small agricultural operations that held true in Herschweiler-Pettersheim right up until the middle of the 20th century can still be made out. The predominant system in farming up to that time, which saw the younger generation taking over the day-to-day running of farms when their parents became elderly, and thus offering the parents some security in their old age, could not keep up with the system that became predominant after the Second World War. Younger workers could earn salaries, and industry was altering the economic and social landscape. The undervaluing of agricultural products, too, in comparison with industrial ones steadily thrust farming into rationalization with its consequent growth in farms' average size, or even forced some people to give farms up and shift to wage-dependent work. Of the 125 farming operations still in business in 1950, which employed 36.8% of the local workforce, only 73 were still in business in 1960. By 1970, this had shrunk to 26, by 1986 to 13 and by 2000 to only 4 run as primary sources of earnings, while a further two were run as secondary sources of earnings, with the trend continuing downwards. Besides agriculture, men and women from Herschweiler-Pettersheim and the surrounding area could seek their livelihoods at the hard-stone quarries on the Steinkopf and the Hühnerrech, which had been opened as early as 1832 and were not shut down for good until 1972, as quarrymen, stone dressers, pitmen, stone chippers and hauliers. The municipality, too, profited from tenancies and tax revenues. Earning great importance after the First World War were the local diamond-cutting workshops that arose in the area around Brücken, about 4 km south of Herschweiler-Pettersheim and the hub of the Palatine diamond-cutting industry, which gave rise to an economic upswing. The groundwork for this blossoming industry was laid for Herschweiler-Pettersheim in 1908 by Christian Schultheiß, who came from the German centre for diamond processing in Hanau, and who had been recruited in 1887-1888 by Isidor Dreyfuß for the newly founded diamond-cutting workshop at the Neumühle ("New Mill") between Ohmbach and Brücken. Further growth was cut short only a few years later when the First World War broke out, but this was only a temporary setback, and work began again in 1923. The industry's promising development was again cut short in October 1929 when the stock markets in the USA crashed and the Great Depression struck the industrialized world. Since demand for diamonds was now very slight and since rough stones were now hard to come by anyway, many diamond cutters were out of work for weeks or even longer. Once the National Socialists had seized power, though, the situation did not improve at first. The Nazi boycott of Dutch and Belgian diamond dealers, brought about by the persecution of Jews in Germany, forced 13 of the 14 local independent diamond-cutting businesses to shut up shop in 1933, with the remaining one cutting back on the amount of business that it did. Low production costs due to the Nazi state's subsidies, and the high quality standard, made the boycott ineffective, so that the business reached a peak in 1935. Of the 3,500 people then working in the 150 businesses in the Palatine diamond industry, 197 diamond cutters were working at 23 diamond-cutting workshops in Herschweiler-Pettersheim. With the outbreak of the Second World War, almost all these businesses were shut down. After currency reform in 1948 (the introduction of the Deutsche Mark), the diamond-cutting industry came back to life. Between 1950 and 1960, Herschweiler-Pettersheim had roughly 30 such businesses, and even as many as 50 until 1972. Even so, as early as 1957, business was suffering from quickly shrinking earnings. It was actually in 1972 that all work in the industry ceased, the industry's fate sealed by competition from countries with lower labour costs. All that can be seen of the industry today in Herschweiler-Pettersheim is the former diamond-cutting workshop buildings, recognizable from their great lattice windows. When the rich coal deposits on the Saar started a boom in the coal and iron industry, workers from Herschweiler-Pettersheim, too, found jobs there as miners and ironworkers. About 1890, young people set off on foot in great throngs, walking far, to the new workplaces in the Frankenholz and Neunkirchen mines and at the ironworks. Once there, they worked the whole week through, stayed in dormitories, and returned home on Sunday. With a knapsack full of potato waffles to keep themselves warm during the work week, they set off back to their jobs on Sunday evening. The women took care of farming, the children herded the cows and goats on common land. Until the time after the Second World War, many people still worked their land as a secondary occupation as worker-farmers or retired miners. First and foremost, the Bergmannskühe (literally "miner's cows"; that is to say, goats) helped worker families out of the grimmest neediness after the war. After the fall of the ironworking industry and the closure of many collieries in the Saarland in the last fourth of the 20th century in the face of stiff foreign competition, many workers switched to the processing and finishing industry in the Homburg and Kaiserslautern area. The old adage "nothing is as constant as change", however, applies here, too. With the growing shift of cost-intensive production facilities about the turn of the millennium to countries with low labour costs, the economic outlook for the Saarland and the Western Palatinate is rather more bleak than rosy. Also grave was the decline of craft occupations beginning about 1970. The vocations of blacksmith, shoemaker, tailor, painter and cabinetmaker fell victim to industrial output. Even those of baker and butcher met the same fate in the late 20th century. Of the three bakeries and two butcher's shops of the postwar era, only the Leixner butcher's shop was still in business in 2000. All other goods were sold by foreign firms in local branch locations. Wars, suppression of freedom of thought and economic need are also reflected in population figures. The Thirty Years' War (1618-1648) almost emptied Herschweiler and Pettersheim of people. In 1670, only five families came back. Into the almost thoroughly depopulated Duchy of Palatinate-Zweibrücken came new settlers from various parts of Germany, but foremost in number were those who came from Switzerland. During French King Louis XIV’s wars of conquest, several more Pettersheim farmers were killed on 5 December 1675 when the Homburg Garrison was attacked. There was great loss of life among the local population, too, in the First World War (1914-1918), in which 24 local men fell, and in the Second World War (1939-1945), in which 67 local men fell and 29 went missing. Economic distress and a lack of future prospects have also made some locals turn their backs on their homeland and seek their fortune in faraway lands. As early as 1709, and again later in 1742, citizens from Herschweiler and Pettersheim took part in the first great wave of emigration from southwestern Germany to the New World and settled in Pennsylvania, "America's Palatinate". Beginning in 1765, some accepted Empress Empress Maria Theresia's and Emperor Joseph II's offer of settlement in the southeast of their empire. Thus, in 1765, Jakob Hederich, who was born in Pettersheim, cropped up in the records as working in Bačka and the Banat as a teacher and a preacher along with Friedrich and Christian Schneider. Only at the beginning of Bavarian times in 1816 did the numbers of people emigrating to North America rise again. In 1816, the Year Without a Summer, bad grain harvests along with their attendant unpleasant consequences led ten local day-labourer families with all together 51 persons to emigrate. Between 1833 and 1854, six individual villagers and 45 families with one to ten children left the village to seek new lives elsewhere. During this time, far more than 200 persons, smallhold farmers, day labourers and craftsmen may have left Herschweiler-Pettersheim, which is reflected in stagnating, and even shrinking, population figures. From 1833 to 1883, the American state of Ohio was a target of local emigrants; a West Palatine colony of sorts was forming there about 1840. Three poor families wanted to emigrate to Algeria, but could not obtain approval because they did not have enough money to make the trip.

The following table shows population development over the centuries for Herschweiler-Pettersheim, with some figures broken down by religious denomination:

Year	1609	1635	1670	1700	1785	1802	1815/23	1840	1835/46	1852	1855	1861	1867	1871	1875	1880
Total	112	1*	5*	20*	264	430	619	568	617	534	603	603	632	630	660	700
Evangelical												530
Catholic												62
Other												6
No answer												11
None												38
Year	1885	1895	1900	1905	1910	1919	1939	1950	1970	1980	1990	1999	2000	2002	2003	2003
Total	642	742	776	814	866	762	1,112	1,213	1,396	1,338	1,395	1,427	1,480	1,436	1,419	1,417
Evangelical													1,115			1,042
Catholic													201			207
Other													15			–
No answer													33			45
None													106			–

* These figures show the number of families.

=== Municipality's names ===
The municipality of Herschweiler-Pettersheim grew together from two formerly separate villages. Said to be the boundary between the "upper village" lying farther upstream and the "lower village" lying farther downstream is the Geilbach in the village centre. In 1446, Herschweiler had its first documentary mention as Hirßwylre and Herßwiler. Other names that it has borne over time are Hersewillr and Herßwilr (1460), Herßwiler (1480), Herßwiller (1546), Heerschweiler (1609) and Hersch=weiler (1824). The village's name, Herschweiler, has the common German placename ending —weiler, which as a standalone word means "hamlet" (originally "homestead"), and which is derived from the Latin villare, and indeed Herschweiler lies not far from the Roman villa rustica excavated from 1959 to 1961. The placename does not, as Ernst Christmann presumed, derive from the German word Hirsch ("hart"), but rather from the name Heriso, and thus the name Herschweiler would originally have meant "Heriso's Homestead". According to toponymical research, the —weiler villages were founded sometime between 650 and 700. Researchers Bruchmüller, Haubrichs and Spang believe that Romance-speakers were settled here by the Abbey of Saint-Remi in Reims, which had holdings here. At the time of the transfer of the County of Veldenz into a new County Palatine of Zweibrücken in 1444, Herschweiler and Pettersheim were named as villages of the Schultheißerei of Konken. In 1731, the school attendant Valentin Meßing mentioned the villages of "Langenbach and Herschweiler together with Pfettersheim". In the 1744 mill protocol initiated by Duke Christian IV and developed by Chamber of Finance Secretary Johann Friedrich Marx, the upper village was still called Dorf Herschweiler ("Village of Herschweiler").

On 23 April 1387, Pettersheim had its first documentary mention in a document dealing with a division of holdings from Counts Heinrich III and Friedrich II of Veldenz as Castle Pederßheim. The name "Pettersheim" is not one of the older group of villages with named ending in —heim ("home", even in modern-day German). According to E. Christmann, the village grew up in connection with the moated castle, whose name, Petersheim, was chosen by its builder, and whose meaning is simply "Peter's Home". The 1458 spelling Pedersheym was one that lasted up until about the time when French Revolutionary troops plundered the castle in 1793. The Palatinate-Zweibrücken government councillor David König wrote of das Haus Pettersheim as early as 1677 in his description of the duchy. Alongside that is found the spelling Schloß Pfeddersheim, used by the state scrivener at Lichtenberg Castle, and in the 1744 mill protocol mentioned above, the same spelling still used today. At what point in time the two villages of Herschweiler and Pettersheim formally merged – or for that matter, whether it was even formally brought about – is unknown. It can be gathered from the 1798/1799 civic registers that no special importance was placed on which part of the village anyone was from, and that the two places were then already regarded as one village, although the register still named Herschweiler, Pettersheim or "Bockhof" as a citizen's birthplace. The modern spelling was only permanently confirmed on 4 October 1929 by decree from the Bavarian Ministry of State for the Interior. The Paris architect Pierre Patte (1723-1814) wrote in his catalogue raisonné that he had drawn up les dessins d'une Maison de chasse ... Petterschem ("the plans for a hunting lodge called Petterschem"). What is startling about this is that this spelling, to be found in a French document, has been preserved in older inhabitants' speech in Herschweiler-Pettersheim and the surrounding area for more than 200 years (IPA: [ˈpɛtɐʃm̩]), and is still customary now, perhaps because it is easier to say than "Pettersheim" (IPA: [ˈpɛtɐshaɪm]).

=== Vanished villages ===
Unearthed right near a spring, roughly 750 m east of the Ortsteil of Herschweiler and under a tailing heap formerly used by the hard-stone quarry, were a villa rustica's foundations, in work done by Wilhelm Jordan between 1958 and 1961 for the Speyer Archaeological Monument Care (Archäologische Denkmalpflege Speyer). The complex's form matches that typical of farmsteads in the Roman Empire's northern provinces and belongs to TVD "Bollendorf". Characteristic of this is the nearly square shape of the whole complex, measuring 23 × 23.5 m with corner risalti and a jutting portico façade that was once decorated by four columns. The estate had a great central hall measuring 16.5 × 12 m, which was used for commercial purposes. Available to the commercial space on the ground floor was roughly 290 m², while upstairs, where it can be assumed there was living space, there was another 248 m². A great deal of flat wall plaster painted red and yellow suggests that the place was elegantly decorated. It can be gathered from the finds that the stone building arose in the 120s AD, and apparently destroyed by fire in the 270s during the Germanic invasions in the border areas between the Roman provinces of Germania Superior and Gallia Belgica. Other buildings that went up in Roman times may have stood somewhere from 200 to 700 m to the west of the estate. The unearthed villa rustica remains the first object of its kind in the Palatinate to be preserved as an open-air museum.

== Religion ==
In 1523, Franz von Sickingen sent the Reformer Johann Schwebel from his fortress at Ebernburg to Zweibrücken. Schwebel, who was named court preacher, town pastor and general superintendent by Duke Louis II (ruled 1522-1532), decreed the first Lutheran Church Order. It was a few years, though, before the Order reached some of the outlying Ämter, for the Imperial Diet of Speyer of 1529 forbade the spread of the new teaching. In Konken and its ecclesiastical affiliate Quirnbach along with other places that belonged to them ecclesiastically, the shift to Protestantism must have come about by 1538, for in that year, a Reverend Johannes was named as the Protestant pastor in Konken. Duke Wolfgang (ruled 1563-1569), likewise one of Luther's followers, like his regent, Rupert (future Count of Veldenz), completed the Reformation in his duchy. The monasteries in the duchy were confiscated, and in general, church services were being given in line with Lutheran teaching. The time of the Lutheran faith was, however, short-lived. When Duke John I (ruled 1569-1604), who was Calvinist, succeeded Duke Wolfgang, the subjects had to convert, under the principle of cuius regio, eius religio laid down by the 1555 Peace of Augsburg, to their leader's Reformed belief. Many clergymen frowned upon this decision. One who actually opposed the change was the Konken pastor. He was threatened with dismissal should he be unwise enough to repeat his displeasure once more. The first Reformed pastor of the Church of Konken was Michael Simon Holzapfel, who held the post from 1553 to 1571. For the new faith, a new catechism was introduced, which the pastor and the schoolteacher had to bear in mind when teaching. Although Holzapfel was named as the Evangelical-Reformed pastor in the 1567 parish register, Konken only became a Reformed parish in 1588. Adherence to the new teaching was overseen by ecclesiastical visitations. Belonging to the parish of Konken as early as 1538 were, besides Konken, also Herschweiler-Pettersheim, Langenbach, Krottelbach (about half the members), Albessen, Herchweiler and Unterselchenbach. The 1575 ecclesiastical visitation, which named "Veitin von Pedershym" as one of the "censors" (presbyters), consisted mainly of complaints about the state of the church building (badly roofed, rotten beams, no glass windows). On the bright side, however, the parishioners were found to be well enough grounded in Catechism. In 1589, the year after the Lutherans of Palatinate-Zweibrücken had converted to Calvinism, Duke John I issued an order to the state scrivener at Lichtenburg and superintendent Johannes Fabricius in Kusel to visit all parishes in the Oberamt of Lichtenburg, which was done in 1590. In Konken, the "censors" were satisfied with the pastor's teaching and behaviour, but complained about the lack of help and support from the patron lord. In the time that followed, the Protestant princes thoroughly rid themselves of Imperial restraint, which led to the formation of two denominationally oriented camps. The unending dispute between them came to a head in 1618 with the outbreak of a religious war, which had disastrous consequences for the local population. After Emperor Ferdinand II's counterstrike and Protestant Elector Friedrich V's flight into exile, the Emperor transferred the title of Elector Palatine to the Bavarian Duke Maximilian I. His general, Tilly, conquered great parts of the Electorate of the Palatinate and Palatinate-Zweibrücken in 1620, forcing subjects there to adopt the Catholic faith. Spanish and Italian troops, too, fighting on the Emperor's side, took part in the conquest of Palatine domains and marauded over the land plundering. The grimmest destruction, though, was wrought by Croatian mercenaries, who in 1635 plundered and burnt down not only Kusel but also Konken with its church. Anyone who could not flee was murdered. The upshot was that the whole region was laid waste and almost utterly depopulated. The Konken pastor Jakob Brackius temporarily fled, so that even ecclesiastical life was temporarily extinguished. Of the 130 inhabitants in Konken before the Croatian onslaught, nobody was left afterwards. The same held true in neighbouring villages. Only under Duke Frederick Louis, who ruled from 1661 to 1681, were there advances towards reconstruction. It was not long, though, before the region was stricken with yet more war, this time French King Louis XIV’s Nine Years' War, which resulted in more hardship and woe. Louis XIV's occupation (1688-1696) promoted "Recatholicization", and members of the Catholic faith could once again be found in the Herschweiler-Pettersheim area, but mostly in small communities within towns. Calvinism's privileged status was thus limited. Only after the 1697 Treaty of Ryswick, under whose terms the Duchy of Palatinate-Zweibrücken was awarded to King Charles XII of Sweden, putting the Duchy in personal union with Sweden and giving him the title of Duke of Palatinate-Zweibrücken, was ecclesiastical development set on new paths. Before withdrawing from those lands that they had originally wanted to incorporate into their empire, the French had determined that the Catholic communities should remain in existence. Obviously, before the Treaty of Ryswick, the Church of Konken was served by a Catholic priest and after the Treaty, it was barred to Catholics, who were then parochially united with Kusel. In Sweden, of course, it was the Lutheran faith that predominated, leading to a revival of sorts in the Palatinate. At first, little colonies of Swedish officials in the main towns formed their own Lutheran communities. The Palatine-Swedish administration's tolerant stance motivated people of all different denominations, who faced hardship elsewhere in Germany for no other reason than their beliefs, to move to the Duchy. This tolerant stance later shifted, however, to favour Lutherans. The idea of according all three denominations the same rights was only good as long as tolerance was exercised by all sides. This, however, was often not the case. Ecclesiastical life changed at this time from the ground up. Gone for good were the days when the Duke could favour one Christian denomination and forbid all others. By now there were three Christian denominations in Kusel and a Jewish community besides. Charles XII was succeeded by Gustav Samuel Leopold, who converted to Catholicism, possibly to curry Imperial favour. Under his rule, Catholicism was once again tolerated, and even promoted, as had been the case during the French occupation, although this did not mean that the three denominations that were widespread in the Duchy always lived happily together; there were often tensions, with those between the Lutherans and Calvinists being greatest. So that new churches would not need to be built throughout the Duchy, King and Duke Samuel Leopold introduced the simultaneum, whereby a single church would be available to different denominations at different times. Thus, in Kusel, the Calvinists and Catholics shared the town church, while Lutherans built themselves a church in 1747 on the Bangert, which burnt down in 1794 and was built anew in 1805. After the merger of the two Protestant denominations, it was transferred to the Catholics. After the new Catholic church was built on Lehnstraße, the church on the Bangert was torn down. After the childless Swedish King Gustav Samuel Leopold died in 1731, rule passed to Count Palatine Christian III, who was an evangelical Christian. After struggling for recognition of his legitimacy, he died shortly after finally receiving it and was succeeded by his 13-year-old son Duke Christian IV, for whom his mother ruled as regent until he came of age. Christian IV was an enlightened and tolerant Duke whom the Duchy owed thanks for improvements in the field of religion. Mindful as he was of what would be expected if he was to succeed as Elector of the Palatinate and Duke of Bavaria, he converted to Catholicism. After his death in 1775 he was followed by the pompous and egomaniacal Charles II August, the time of whose rule fell in the last few decades before the French Revolution. In 1798, the Duchy had been formally swept away by the French, along with its feudal system. The church books lost their recordkeeping functions. With the raising of Brücken to a Catholic parish in 1803, the Catholics of Herschweiler-Pettersheim, along with those in the Bockhof, were parochially united with Brücken. In 1839, the parish of Brücken counted all together 1,069 Catholics in the following places:

- Brücken — 610
- Altenkirchen — 10
- Bockhof — 6
- Dittweiler — 54
- Frohnhofen — 0
- Herschweiler and Pettersheim — 54
- Königreicher Hof — 10
- Krottelbach — 1
- Neumühle — 8
- Ohmbach — 306
- Paulengrund — 10

According to statistics from 1861, the 603 inhabitants in Herschweiler-Pettersheim were, by religious affiliation, 62 Catholics and 530 Protestants and Mennonites [sic]. The Konken Reformed Protestant community passed to the Inspectorate of Limbach in 1815 and to the Protestant deaconry of Kusel in 1820. It was until the Palatine Union in 1818 made up of the parish of Konken with eight villages and 1,190 souls and the parish of Quirnbach with five villages and 932 souls, making 2,122 souls all together. The two-hour journey to the branch church in Quirnbach from the mother church in Konken as well as the arduousness of the journey itself made "dem Pfarrer ein Pferd nöthig" ("a horse necessary for the pastor"). In 1825, Quirnbach was itself raised to parish. Until 1839, when Herschweiler-Pettersheim got its own graveyard, the dead were buried at the mother church's graveyard in Konken. In Herschweiler-Pettersheim, the efforts to secure a church in the village itself reach back to the 19th century. In 1897, Herschweiler-Pettersheim municipal council decided to establish a church building fund. Only in 1913, though, was a church building association formed, which up to 1923 had amassed assets of 14,000 marks, only to see its worth shrink to nothing in the hyperinflation that beset Weimar Germany at this time. It was thirty years before Herschweiler-Pettersheim formed another church building association in 1953, and on 21 June that year, the foundation stone for Herschweiler-Pettersheim's own church was laid. The building material was sandstone, which was broken on the spot. On 10 October 1954, the church, built to plans by Kaiserslautern architect Heuser, was consecrated by Deacon Cassel. Youths were first confirmed there in 1955. An organ was built into the church on 19 February 1956, followed by the dedication of three cast-steel bells on 2 September 1956. On 1 January 1961, the autonomous vicariate of Herschweiler-Pettersheim became a parish in its own right. In 1962 and 1963, a rectory and a youth home were built along with two blockhouses. For its 25-year jubilee, the church got its name: Evangelische Kirche St. Michael ("Saint Michael's Evangelical Church").

== Politics ==
=== Municipal council ===
The council is made up of 16 council members, who were elected by proportional representation at the municipal election held on 7 June 2009, and the honorary mayor as chairman.

The municipal election held on 7 June 2009 yielded the following results:

Year	SPD	FWG	Total
2009	7	9	16 seats
2004	7	9	16 seats

"FWG" is a voters' group.

=== Mayors ===
Herschweiler-Pettersheim's mayor since 2019 has been Margot Schillo.

Herschweiler-Pettersheim's mayors since 1800 have been as follows:

- 1800–1805 Johann Neuberger
- 1805–1816 Johann Friederich Limberger
- 1816–1821 Johannes Wollenweber
- 1821–1843 Adam Mehl, Langenbach
- 1843–1853 Jakob Fauß 4., Konken
- 1853–1881 Georg Morgenstern
- 1881–1884 Jakob Cloß
- 1884–1890 Ludwig Blind
- 1890–1919 Peter Müller
- 1919–1924 Christian Schultheiß
- 1925–1926 Otto Hollinger
- 1926–1929 Jakob Rietz
- 1930–1940 Hermann Theiß
- 1940–1942 Karl Fell
- 1942–1943 Friedrich Gerlach
- 1943–1945 Ernst Häßel
- 1945–1948 Ludwig Becker
- 1948–1956 August Karst
- 1956–1964 Albert Hollinger
- 1965–1969 August Karst
- 1969–1972 Karl Fetterroll
- 1972–1974 Wilhelm Woditsch
- 1974–1989 Günter Schug
- 1989–2006 Karl Schmitt
- 2006–2009 Rüdiger Becker
- 2009–2019 Klaus Drumm
- 2019– Margot Schillo

=== Coat of arms ===
The municipality's arms might be described thus: Or in base a mount with grass proper on which a hart springing gules unguled and attired of the field.

This device was used as early as 1747 in a local court seal, and thus goes back to Duke Christian IV's time, when Schloss Pettersheim was his base for coursing hunts. The old 1740 court seal from the neighbouring village of Langenbach likewise showed a hart, but drinking water instead of "springing", as the main charge in these arms does.

== Culture and sightseeing ==
=== Buildings ===
The following are listed buildings or sites in Rhineland-Palatinate's Directory of Cultural Monuments:

- Protestant parish church, Kirchenstraße 47 – asymmetrical rusticated building, 1954, architect Eugen Heußer, Kaiserslautern; aisleless church with bar westwork
- Am Schäfergarten 12 – former school; spacious, sandstone-framed building with hipped roof, 1909/1910, architect C. M. Raysz, Kaiserslautern
- Hauptstraße 1–9 – Hauter Estate; long estate complex; house 1836, former barn and stables, one-floor commercial building marked 1841
- Villa rustica, north of the village – remnants of an estate from Roman times, early 2nd century; small manor house with portico and corner risalti, hall with cellar

=== Regular events ===
Until 1924, Herschweiler-Pettersheim's kermis (church consecration festival) was held in November on the Sunday after Saint Martin's Day (11 November), and thus after the Langenbach kermis and the Quirnbach horse market. Because the inn "Zur Post" was the working man's public house, serving those who spent more willingly, the main action played out there. At the other inn, "Zum Hirschen" in the upper village, which was geared more to the local farmers, things were a bit quieter. In 1925, the kermis was moved to the first Sunday in September, and beginning in 1936 it was held instead on the third Sunday in September. It is nominally two festivals held on the same day, known in the local speech as the Owwerderfer Kerb ("Upper Village Fair") and the Unnerderfer Kerb ("Lower Village Fair"). Beginning about 1960, the main action was generally shifted to the upper village, as it was there that a children's carousel, carnival games, sales booths and parking were to be found. Both the inns, which each had a dancehall at their disposal, had their Straußbuben ("bouquet lads" – a kermis tradition) who paraded through the village, loudly, in a competition between the Straußbuben from the upper village and those from the lower village. In the time on Sunday evening when there was no more dancing, the bouquet would be brought late in the evening by the Straußbuben from the upper village to the lower village and hidden in a barn. The Straußbuben from the lower village would do the reverse. On the way home, the inns, which participated in the competition, would be visited, where there would be a preponderance not only in patrons' numbers. On Sunday afternoon, the kermis bouquet would be fetched by the bouquet youth in a parade accompanied by an orchestra and carried through the whole village by muscle power (for it was quite a big bouquet). Today, this is done by tractor and bejewelled followers. After the bouquet is stuck on the inn, the speech reader greets the listeners in rhyme. In the main speech, the Kerwepfarrer ("Kermis pastor" – not a real clergyman) goes over particular events in village life, and also, some inhabitants find their legs being pulled. After the kermis speech, the bouquet is watered and the youth dance the Drei Ersten ("Three First [Ones]") in the kermis hall. Since 2000, though, there have been no more Straußbuben in the lower village. Because today the Frühschoppen – the custom of the early-morning drink – now lasts until the evening, the custom of the Kranzheraustanzen ("dancing the bouquet out") on Monday afternoon has been lost. Furthermore, because dance orchestras cost so dearly and because of waning popularity, the Monday night dancing has fallen by the wayside. Instead, there is a Saturday night dancing event. Straußbuben from the upper village still go about the village with musical instruments on kermis Tuesday gathering money and produce. While there was once dancing on Tuesday evening at the end of kermis, nowadays, at midnight in the kermis hall, the Kerwepfarrer, with much to-do and clamour, "buries" the Straußbuben. Often enough, the kermis was dug up again on Wednesday and celebrated further with the monies gathered on Tuesday. There are three other regular events, a Dorffest ("Village Festival"), the Nohkerb ("Afterkermis") and the Weihnachtsmarkt ("Christmas Market").

=== Clubs ===
The oldest cultural representative in the municipality is the Männergesangverein 1871 e.V., a men's singing club. The mostly older singers still keep the tradition of singing at recitals, singing festivals, burials and war memorial services. In 1905, the Arbeitergesangverein "Liederkranz" ("Workers' Singing Club") was also founded as a men's singing club. In 1925, a mixed choir was formed, in which likewise both men and women of rather advanced age sing, and which appears here and there together with the Männergesangverein. By its activities, the Landfrauenverein ("Countrywomen's Club") can likewise be called a municipal cultural representative. On its programme are useful and interesting courses and presentations on household and health topics. Far beyond the municipality's limits, the Musikverein ("Music Club") founded in 1988, with its modern repertoire and big band sound, has made a name for itself. The orchestra, which has many members, owed its great numbers to its conductor, Horst Durst, a music teacher at the district music school and himself a "full-blooded" musician. These members are mostly younger musicians from outlying villages. The orchestra plays at a high level. The sport club, founded in 1920, has earned great importance, after still having to play matches in meadows at the time when football was introduced. Today the club has at its disposal a hard pitch and a grass pitch, as well as a clubhouse. The sport club, too, has many members, with groups in various kinds of sport. After the loosening of the ban on firearms after the Second World War, the Schützenverein "Hubertus" (shooting club) was founded in 1963. At the shooting facility set up on the Kreuzberg, even marksmen and markswomen from outside the village come to pursue their sport. A skittle club was founded in 1972 after a Bundeskegelbahn (a skittle facility meeting the standards laid out by the Deutscher Kegler- und Bowlingbund) had been built at the inn "Zum Hirschen". The table tennis club split away from the sport club, becoming a club in its own right, in 1975, and is particularly popular among the village's youth. The Freizeitclub 69 e.V., the Freizeitclub "Blaue Löwen" e.V. founded in 1974 and the Freizeitclub "Harry's Truppe" founded in 1983 are the village's leisure clubs, and they tend to the camaraderie, friendship and conviviality arising from football, and also to other sporting interests. Similar goals are pursued by the club Wanderfreunde Oberland und Umgebung Herschweiler-Pettersheim (hiking), founded in 1976, which has repeatedly organized IVV hikes. Great social services are done by the German Red Cross local chapter, founded in 1960, with its on-call service and first aid, as well as with its first-aid training and blood donation appointments. The Sozialverband VdK Deutschland (or simply VdK) local chapter, founded in 1949, busied itself after the Second World War fighting for social justice for the war wounded and the bereaved. The Arbeiter-Unterstützungsverein ("Workers' Support Club"), founded in 1894, has also pursued from the beginning the goal of helping members' families over the initial neediness in case of death. The pensioners' club, founded in 1966, seeks through various kinds of events to forge closer contact between the older citizens and prevent them from being isolated. An important cultural and social task is fulfilled by the fruitgrowing and gardening club, which has set itself the goals of promoting fruitgrowing and the use of fruit, fruit tree care as well as village beautification and living space design. The SPD local chapter, founded in 1919, forcibly dissolved in 1933 by the Third Reich and refounded in 1949, has, of course, political goals. Not very many members still belong to the local chapter of the Pfälzische Bauern und Winzerschaft e. V. (farming and winegrowing), but the regional small animal raising club is still active in Herschweiler-Pettersheim.

=== Recreation ===
There is an abandoned quarry on the Hühnerkopf that is quite scenic. It has hiking trails.

== Economy and infrastructure ==
=== Economic structure ===
As a village with a central place function, three bakeries with "colonial wares" (originally, products from the "colonies", thus coffee, tea, cane sugar, tobacco, rice and so on), two butcher's shops and one Asko Europa-Stiftung branch covered basic demands after the Second World War and until about 1975. Available for further needs were two bank branches, a postal agency, a pharmacy, two textile shops, a shoe shop, an electrical shop, two retail and housewares shops, a stationery shop, a jewellery and watch shop, two shoemaker's shops, an installation and heating system builder, a locksmith and blacksmith, a cabinetmaker, a painting shop, two hairdressing salons, three tailor's shops, two dressmaker's shops, an automotive workshop with a filling station, a Pfalzwerke AG (energy supplier) works and a Raiffeisen yard. These offerings were for a while bolstered by six inns and a cinema. Business and crafts ensured many jobs at that time. There was also work on farms, at the stone quarry and at the many diamond-cutting shops. With the mayoralty, the taxation office, the constabulary, the primary school and the Hauptschule, Herschweiler-Pettersheim was a place with good infrastructure. With administrative restructuring in 1972, the village lost its central-place function. The mayoralty and the taxation office were, in the face of the local populace's opposition, dissolved and by law reassigned to the Verbandsgemeinde of Glan-Münchweiler, a great loss for the municipality, which now had to make do with being nothing more than a population centre. A further cause of this decline was the rising industrial output and mass production of daily needs, the rise of supermarkets, the population's shift towards the throw-away society, unfavourable wage-price development in agriculture, craft occupations and the diamond industry, which sealed agriculture's and local business's fate. Even the post withdrew from the village and the area. Only a few survived the ruinous competition. Of all the businesses that were running just after the war, only one butcher's shop (with a one-year interruption), one hairdressing salon, the pharmacy (run by Otto Carius) and two inns that both serve meals survived to the turn of the millennium. However, there were some new businesses that came to Herschweiler-Pettersheim in the meantime. Since 1982, a food market with baked goods and meat departments, two branch shops selling baked goods, a drink shop, a florist's shop, a Turkish produce shop, a kebab shop and a tanning salon have located in the village. Also, in 1973, the Chalou GmbH clothing factory located on the Bockhof, manufacturing ladies' outerwear. Following the general economic development, the actual production (sewing) was shifted to Eastern Europe, while designing, precutting, pattern creation, final inspection, sales and distribution are all things that are handled at the Herschweiler-Pettersheim facility, which in 2004 employed roughly 70 women (but almost 100 in 1986). It is currently the biggest employer in the village and the biggest business tax payer in the Verbandsgemeinde. There are not very many job opportunities for villagers in the village itself nowadays. Indeed, Herschweiler-Pettersheim's economic structure must be deemed to be rather weak. Most people in the workforce must therefore seek livelihoods in the Saarland and in the Kaiserslautern area, commuting to jobs.

=== Education ===
From Duke Louis II's time as ruler (1522-1532), which was marked by ecclesiastical upheaval and constant innovations, all Counts Palatine (Dukes) of Palatinate-Zweibrücken set themselves the task of developing schooling in the Duchy. Ludwig II was said to be the first Elector in the Holy Roman Empire who openly avowed the basic teachings of the Reformation. Not only did he promote every theologian who was prepared to reform the church, but he also saw the promotion of schooling as being an integral part of the Reformation, for Martin Luther himself had demanded of mayors and aldermen as early as 1524 the establishment and maintenance of Christian schools, a task that would fall to clergymen. "Only he who truly knew Christian teaching could in Luther's perception be a good Christian." Bearing this in mind, it seemed obvious that the task of raising these good Christians would be easier if children learnt to read, write, sing and pray. Thus, even in the Reformation's earliest days, schools were opened in the duchy's towns and all children had to attend. Successes were, however, moderate, for the need for reading and writing was not readily understood by many subjects, for the children's fathers, grandfathers and forebears had got along without them quite well in pre-Reformation times, never having undergone the burdensome training now being demanded of the children. For the actual purpose of establishing these schools, much can be read into how the teachers were, as a rule, also candidates for clerical posts, and were sent to teach children outside their own towns. The expansion of the school system was carried out only slowly. To Duke John I's (ruled 1569-1604) way of thinking, children should be taught not only the beliefs of their faith (Catechism), but also reading, writing and "other good arts". In a circular, therefore, he ordered that a school be set up in every parish seat where there was yet to be any schoolmaster or schoolroom, with the local pastor, failing either of those things, teaching the local children if need be. Since Konken was the local parish seat for Herschweiler-Pettersheim – that is to say, that was where everyone went to church – all the parish's children, and hence also the ones from Herschweiler and Pettersheim, had to attend school in Konken. For the winter of 1575-1576, Benedikt Reichhold from Waidenburg (Meißen) is named as the pastor and the schoolmaster, while from 1579 to 1589, Nikolaus Schlemmer from Landstuhl is named as the holder of that post; he was then released from it at his own request. Johann Sebastian Armbruster was likewise both the pastor and the schoolmaster in Konken (with Pfeffelbach and Niederkirchen) from 1592 to 1597. These clergymen, who had to pray not only on Sunday but also throughout the week and also work the parish land, put up a fight against all this extra work with all kinds of excuses. In 1596, the Duke instructed his officials to force the clergy to hold school, and to introduce new schools into 46 further villages. By the time Duke Johannes I died on 12 August 1604, though, thirty places in his realm had schools taught by secular schoolteachers, while in eight further places, schools temporarily had ecclesiastical schoolteachers. This school policy was also maintained by Johannes I's successor, Duke John II, who ruled from 1604 to 1635. The pastors, who had to see to the schoolmasters' maintenance, felt that this extra work was unreasonable, especially as they thereby also had to put up with a reduction of earnings. It could be that this measure was undertaken to offset the reduction in the amount of work that the schoolmasters represented. Meanwhile, certain sectors of the population had come to believe that a school was not an utter disadvantage for the village. The cost of building a schoolroom and the people's poverty, though, further dampened interest in establishing a school. Besides, the villagers would soon have something else to worry about, for the Thirty Years' War was about to break out. This war saw to it that many villages almost died right out, and therefore had no further need for a school. During reconstruction from 1661 to 1681, only five of Herschweiler-Pettersheim's pre-war families actually came back to the village, in 1670. It is clear that school began again in this time, for a schoolmaster for Konken is named for 1671, Kaspar Metzger. Schoolmasters changed often from year to year, with the pastor sometimes taking on the duty between teachers. Daniel Fischer, who had been teaching in Konken since 1692, left the village schoolhouse in 1694, went to Altenglan and stayed there until 1699, when he came back to Konken, only to leave for Altenglan again in 1702. Besides his meagre wages, the schoolmaster received an agreed amount of produce, grain, oats and wine. Most of the produce, though, was not delivered, and the money was also not paid, which was of course the cause of frequent complaints. The subjects, too, often complained, mainly about how they were too poor to pay a schoolmaster. The Reformed school assistant Valentin Meßing, who taught from 1720 to 1729 in Conken (as it was spelt in those days) complained in 1731 that he had not been paid since Saint Martin's Day (11 November) 1730. He was owed half a barrel of grain by each Gemeindsmann (male citizen). From the same year came news that "the villages of Langenbach and Herschweiler together with Pfettersheim" were building schoolhouses and wanted to hire their own schoolteacher. They eventually hired a school assistant later in the year, who nevertheless had to "feed" himself. This was the beginning of the split from the Konken school. The official severing of the link came in 1733. At the time, Herschweiler-Pettersheim counted 14 "Reformed citizens". Named as teacher at the local winter school (a school geared towards an agricultural community's practical needs, held in the winter, when farm families had a bit more time to spare) for 1737-1738 was Johann Georg Dentzer, who was born in Annweiler am Trifels. Church steward Koch had to break it to the municipality that "if they want to keep their own school assistant, they should maintain him without burdening the administration". Thus, each Gemeindsmann was to yield up half a barrel of grain and one Simmer (roughly 22 L) of oats, and further, each one was to pay 8 to 15 Rhenish guilders. Teaching here in 1743 was the old schoolmaster Conrad Fuhr, and from 1744 to 1745 it was Johann Georg Ott. Thereafter, Gottfried Holl from Zweibrücken was named as the poor, abandoned school assistant at Herschweiler-Petersheim. Although the municipality had already gathered up 10 barrels of corn by the time Holl took the job, he only got 6 1/2. Following in 1752 was Mateus Lozenius, and about 1771 came Philipp Heinrich Collini, who in 1778 received a sharp rebuke for his behaviour, and in 1783 he had to switch posts with the Adenbach teacher Praß, because the Reverend Heintz from Konken had reported Praß for apparently visiting an inn, getting drunk and then proceeding to the dance floor. Teaching candidate Philipp Venter followed in 1795, and then sometime between 1796 and 1800 came Christian Praß. In 1825, schoolteacher Kaiser, who complained about how small his lodgings were, was transferred. He was followed by schoolteacher Glöckner, school administrator Fauß (1836-1837) and a schoolteacher named Klensch. In 1822, the municipality's very first schoolhouse – formerly A. Clemens's property – had to be expanded by having a parlour added. In the winter half-year of 1826/1827, 95 children attended the school, while in the summer half-year it was 90. Since the school had become too small by 1829, it was auctioned. For the time being, a new schoolhouse could not be afforded, even though in 1828 a place had been measured out for it. The temporary solution was to move school in 1829 to Langenbach, where it was held in farmer Adam Feick's rented, two-floor farmhouse. Two years later, it was moved again, this time to Jakob Trapp's property. Eventually, in 1833, a new schoolhouse could be afforded. It was later to be used as a mayoral office and the municipal centre. In the winter half-year of 1841, 109 children attended the school, while in the summer half-year it was 114. The number of schoolchildren had risen by 1848 to 127, who were all taught by schoolteacher Klensch and his son as assistant. Obviously the municipality wanted to know nothing about this assistant's additional salary. Even the Royal Bavarian government did not approve the second teaching post upon which the school commission had decided, leaving everyone to make the best of a questionable situation. As a result of rising pupil numbers, the municipality bought forester's assistant Kirsch's house in 1856, which later also served as the municipal centre, and used it after the conversion, beginning in 1860, as a second schoolhouse. In 1874, Karl Dörr came to Herschweiler. He complained about the school conditions and requested a new building, which at first municipal council refused. Knowing that the teacher's post in Kusel was far better (and therefore made the municipality look bad), a new schoolhouse was built in 1879 on the former Stegner property. The two schoolhouses standing next to each other, with a teacher's dwelling, allowed orderly schooling. In 1905, at the business association's request, a Zeichenschule (a kind of early vocational school for training craftsmen) was established for apprentices and local business owners' sons, although this only lasted until 21 October 1914, when it was closed for want of students and because times were bad for craft industries (this was likely due to the outbreak of the First World War a few months earlier). It was headed by the Bavarian schoolteacher Karl Baumbach, who had been teaching since 1882. He had also pressed the municipality for a new building, but municipal council had refused, even in the face of a majority being in favour of it at a citizens' meeting. In 1909, the building now known as "the old schoolhouse" – since 2004, in renovated form, the municipal centre – was built with four classrooms. Uninterrupted teaching continued there for only five years before the First World War broke out, and the teachers were called into the Kaiser's forces. At first, the school simply had to be closed, but later it was run by assistant teachers taking turns with the school in Langenbach, and also with mixed-grade classes. Henceforth, schoolwork was characterized by the course of the war. Owing to petroleum shortages, classes had to begin later, or they were cancelled for lack of heating fuel or because there were public works that the teachers had to perform outside school. School was also cancelled owing to military demands: French prisoners of war were sometimes billeted there; the schoolhouse was used as an army mess when the war ended, for soldiers on the way home; French occupiers quartered themselves there. In the autumn of 1922, the downstairs classrooms received "for the enlightenment of civic gatherings" electric lighting, while the upstairs classrooms were left out owing to cost, leaving wintertime classes to be held with the old-fashioned petroleum lighting. On 2 November 1931, the school head applied to the regional school authority, asking for a stop to be put to the annoyances and obstacles due to the many jobless men who had to pick up their unemployment money here. After 1933, when Adolf Hitler and the Nazis seized power, the school joined in celebrations, torchlight parades and Party events. The lads from 4th to 7th grade from Herschweiler-Pettersheim and neighbouring villages met on the sporting ground in the Wallheck for sport competitions, while the girls held gymnastic demonstrations under the music club's leadership. On 22 March 1937, those entitled to education voted for the introduction of the German Christian Community School. What had hitherto been the Protestantische Volksschule Herschweiler-Pettersheim became the Deutsche Volksschule Herschweiler-Pettersheim. That same year, the 8th grade and a fourth teaching post were introduced. As in the First World War, the end of the Second World War brought school cancellations owing to a lack of teachers, the conversion of the building into a Wehrmacht field hospital and, once again, French occupiers quartered themselves there, claiming three of the rooms in November 1945. Under the most difficult of circumstances, classes were begun again, provisorily, in September, and over the winter sometimes had to be held in unheated rooms. Until the spring of 1946, schoolteacher Klinck taught all classes, with grade levels combined. Only in 1950 was some normalcy restored, once there was a staff of four teachers again. On 29 September 1963, the foundation stone was laid for the sixth schoolhouse in the village's history, on the former sporting ground in the Wallheck. The dedication came on 20 November 1965. On 19 April 1966, Protestantische Volksschule Herschweiler-Pettersheim was declared a Mittelpunktschule ("midpoint school", a central school, designed to eliminate smaller outlying schools). In 1968, the municipalities of Albessen, Frohnhofen, Herchweiler, Herschweiler-Pettersheim, Konken, Krottelbach, Langenbach, Liebsthal, Ohmbach, Selchenbach and Wahnwegen were all grouped into the Herschweiler-Pettersheim School Association (Schulverband Herschweiler-Pettersheim). Grades were organized and some grades were "farmed out" to school buildings elsewhere. This fragmentary arrangement got officials thinking about building a new school for the school association. With the formation of Verbandsgemeinden in 1972, these same bodies also became school zones, leading to a reorganization with regard to neighbouring villages. Glan-Münchweiler as the Verbandsgemeinde seat and Herschweiler-Pettersheim as the biggest municipality by population were each given a Hauptschule department with a primary school organizationally bound thereto. Besides that, the village was equipped with a common, four-group kindergarten for Herschweiler-Pettersheim, Krottelbach and Langenbach and an Evangelical youth home. Today, Herschweiler-Pettersheim has one kindergarten, one primary school and one Regionalschule.

=== Public institutions ===
Herschweiler-Pettersheim also has a village community centre.

=== Transport ===
Herschweiler-Pettersheim lies at the crossroads of Landesstraßen 350 (Kusel-Homburg) and 352 (Glan-Münchweiler-Sankt Wendel). Furthermore, Kreisstraßen 20 (towards Wahnwegen) and 12 (towards Langenbach) link the village to neighbouring ones and the regional road network of Bundesstraßen 423 and 420. To the northeast runs the Autobahn A 62 (Kaiserslautern–Trier) with an interchange at Kusel, 6 km away. The nearest station is Glan-Münchweiler station, which is on the Landstuhl–Kusel railway and is served hourly by Regionalbahn service RB 67 between Kaiserslautern and Kusel, called the Glantalbahn (the name of which refers to the Glan Valley Railway, which shared some of the route of the Landstuhl–Kusel line, including the former junction at Glan-Münchweiler).

== Famous people ==
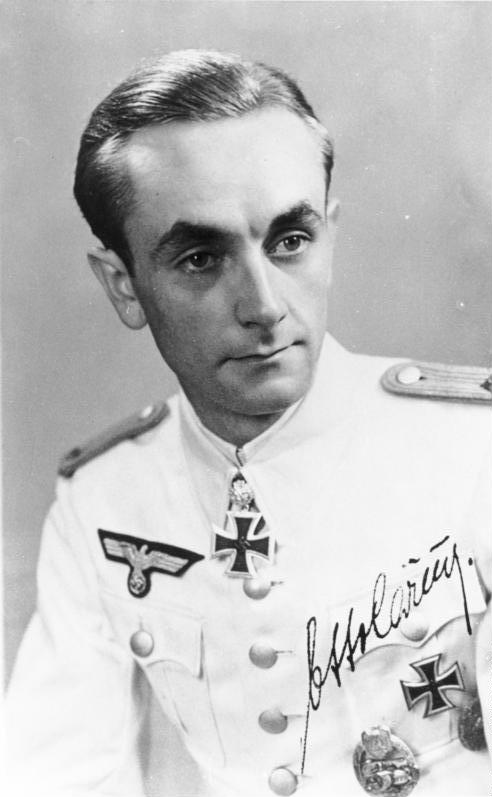
Otto Carius

=== Famous people associated with the municipality ===
- Otto Carius (1922–2015), decorated German tank commander in the Second World War, who ran a pharmacy in Herschweiler-Pettersheim named Tiger Apotheke.
- Christian IV (1722–1775), Duke of Palatinate-Zweibrücken, died in Herschweiler-Pettersheim.
