= Glan-Münchweiler (Verbandsgemeinde) =

Coordinates: 49.471°N 7.446°E

- Verbandsgemeinde
- Locator map of Verbandsgemeinde Glan-Münchweiler in District of Kusel, Rhineland-Palatinate, Germany.
- Country: Germany
- State: Rhineland-Palatinate
- District: Kusel
- Seat: Glan-Münchweiler

Glan-Münchweiler is a former Verbandsgemeinde ("collective municipality") in the district of Kusel, Rhineland-Palatinate, Germany. On 1 January 2017 it merged into the new Verbandsgemeinde Oberes Glantal. The seat of the Verbandsgemeinde was in Glan-Münchweiler.

The Verbandsgemeinde Glan-Münchweiler consisted of the following Ortsgemeinden ("local municipalities"):

1. Börsborn
2. Glan-Münchweiler
3. Henschtal
4. Herschweiler-Pettersheim
5. Hüffler
6. Krottelbach
7. Langenbach
8. Matzenbach
9. Nanzdietschweiler
10. Quirnbach
11. Rehweiler
12. Steinbach am Glan
13. Wahnwegen
