= Wahnwegen =

- Municipality
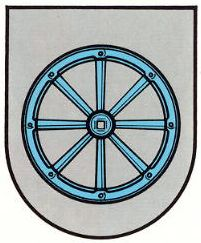
- Coat of arms

- Location of Wahnwegen within Kusel district
- Interactive map of Wahnwegen
- Location within Germany Location within Rhineland-Palatinate
- Coordinates: 49°29′05″N 7°22′34″E
- Country: Germany
- State: Rhineland-Palatinate
- District: Kusel
- Municipal assoc.: Oberes Glantal

Government
  - Mayor (2019–24): Rene Morgenstern

Area
  - Total: 4.64 km^{2} (1.79 sq mi)
- Elevation: 330 m (1,080 ft)

Population (2025-12-31)
  - Total: 642
  - Density: 138/km^{2} (358/sq mi)
- Time zone: UTC+01:00 (CET)
  - Summer (DST): UTC+02:00 (CEST)
- Postal codes: 66909
- Dialling codes: 06384
- Vehicle registration: KUS
- Website: www.wahnwegen.de

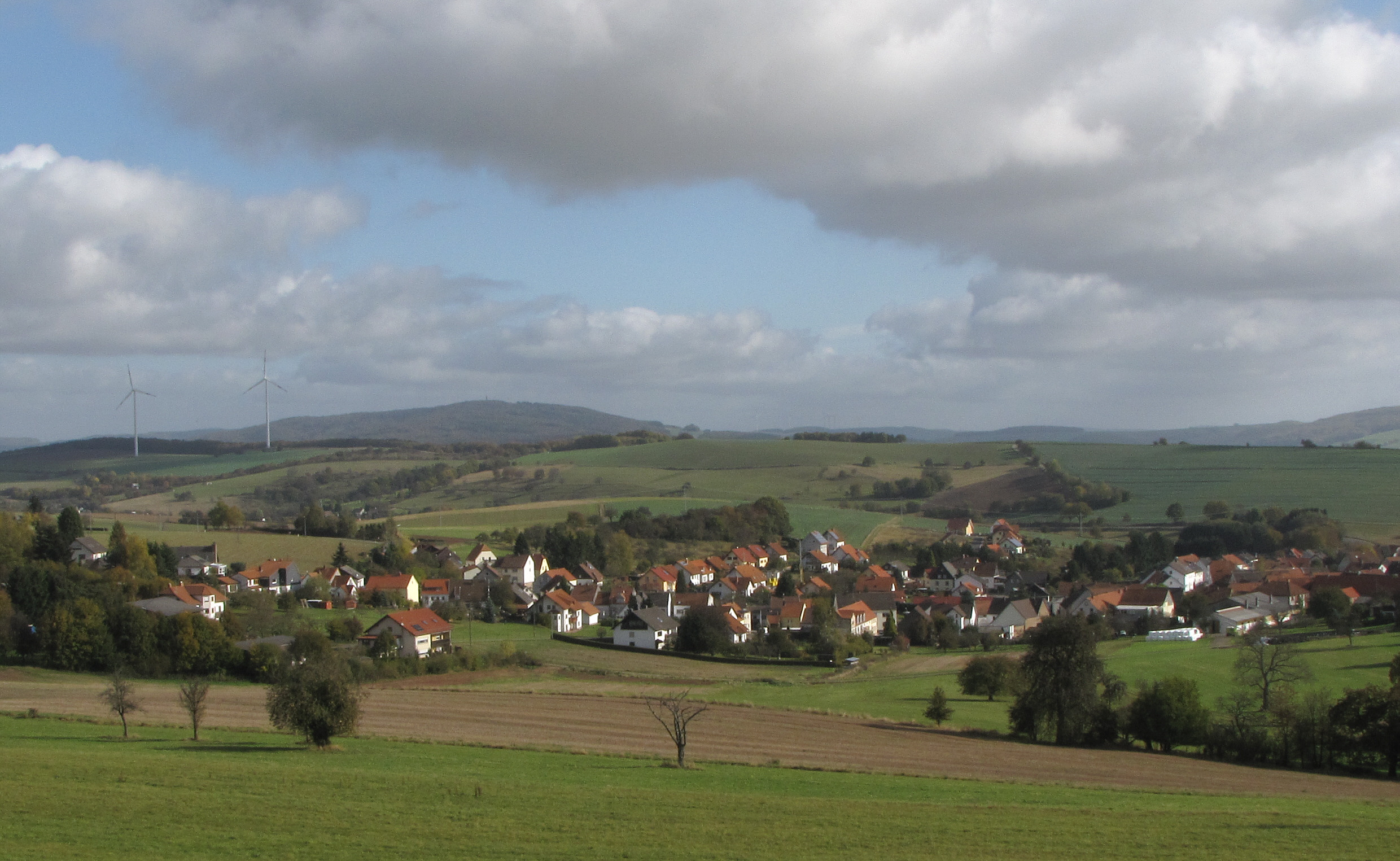
View of Wahnwegen

Wahnwegen is an Ortsgemeinde – a municipality belonging to a Verbandsgemeinde, a kind of collective municipality – in the Kusel district in Rhineland-Palatinate, Germany. It belongs to the Verbandsgemeinde of Oberes Glantal.

== Geography ==
=== Location ===
The municipality lies at the foot of the 437 m-high Hühnerkopf in the Saubeertal (valley) in the Western Palatinate. Wahnwegen's elevation is roughly 310 m above sea level and the village lies in the Bledesbach's headwaters, northeast of the Hühnerkopf (“Chickenhead” – a mountain) with its stone quarries, although these lie within Herschweiler-Pettersheim's limits. A relatively narrow strip of land roughly 3 km long and barely 1 km wide forms Wahnwegen's municipal area, broadening out somewhat towards the north. The local area is rich in forests, especially to the south, where the Hodenbach rises, flowing southwestwards to the Henschbach. The dale through which the Hodenbach flows is well known as a hiking and recreation area. Here in the municipal area's south, mountains reach 375 m above sea level. Farther north, right at the municipality's western limit, looms the Bosten (or the Boster) at 406 m (or 409 m) above sea level, the municipality's highest point (the differing names and elevations arise from a disagreement between sources). The municipality's lowest point lies near the sewage treatment plant on the way out of the village going towards Hüffler. The municipal area measures 463 ha, of which 80 ha is wooded.

=== Neighbouring municipalities ===
Wahnwegen borders in the north on the municipality of Konken, in the northeast on the municipality of Hüffler, in the east on the municipality of Quirnbach, in the southeast on the municipality of Henschtal, in the south on the municipality of Steinbach am Glan and in the west on the municipality of Herschweiler-Pettersheim.

=== Municipality’s layout ===
Wahnwegen is a clump village whose beginnings were as an agricultural village that grew up at a crossroads. Along both these roads stand the village's older houses, which in many cases are typical Westrich (an historic region that encompasses areas in both Germany and France) farmhouses (Einfirsthäuser – houses with a single roof ridge), built either with a gable or an eaves facing the road. A few of these houses are semi-detached as double farmhouses, representing a peculiarity that seldom crops up elsewhere in Westrich villages. The schoolhouse in the village centre, built about 1900, was converted in 1984 into a kindergarten for both Wahnwegen and Hüffler. Hanging once again since 1951 in this building's belltower, built as a ridge turret, has been a bell. The old bell was seized during the Second World War by the Nazis to be melted down. It hung at an older schoolhouse that has since been sold into private ownership. The graveyard lies on the road to Herschweiler-Pettersheim. The village centre has been remodelled according to needs. South of the village lies the sporting ground with the sport clubhouse. A shooting clubhouse stands in the north. There is a popular forest playground on the Bosterrech.

== History ==
=== Antiquity ===
The Wahnwegen area is rich in prehistoric archaeological finds going back to the New Stone Age. On the Heidenhübel north of the village, a heavily weathered stone axe was found, and unearthed south of the village was a red stone arrowhead. Also on the Heidenhübel may once have lain, for many centuries, a prehistoric settlement. A burying ground belonging to this site contains archaeological sites from several epochs stretching from the time of the Urnfield culture (about 1200 BC) to Gallo-Roman times (50 BC to AD 400). Many individual objects from the graves were unearthed and described, but their whereabouts are for the most part now unknown. Further barrows, some in groups, were discovered in the south of the municipal area, and also in the north at the municipal limit with Hüffler. That the Wahnwegen area was inhabited in Roman times is also known from its proximity to the well known villa rustica in Herschweiler-Pettersheim, lying only some 2 km from the Heidenhübel burying ground.

=== Middle Ages ===
Wahnwegen lay in the so-called Remigiusland around Kusel, a part of the original Imperial domain around Kaiserslautern, which in the late 6th century was donated to the Archbishopric of Reims by a Frankish king. Only a few centuries later, though, did Wahnwegen actually arise as a village, perhaps in the 12th or 13th century. Thus, its first documentary mention came relatively late, namely in a 1446 steward's account from Lichtenberg Castle. According to this document, the estate at Wahnwegen had to deliver four Malter of grain to Count Palatine Stephan of Zweibrücken. Other “estates” in the area were mostly deeper in debt to the Count Palatine. This may be a hint that Wahnwegen was then a comparatively small settlement. In 1127, the Counts of Veldenz had taken over the Vogtei (that is, they had become “lords protector”) over the Remigiusland and incorporated the region into a newly founded county. More than 300 years later, the last Countess of Veldenz wed the said Stephan of the Electorate of the Palatinate (as he was then known), who took his own landholds, combined them with the lands that his wife inherited in 1444 – namely the County of Veldenz – and founded the County Palatine of Zweibrücken, which was later generally described as a duchy. Appearing for the first time in a 1480 document are inhabitants’ names from the village of Wahnwegen. It can be gathered from this and other documents that the Counts of Veldenz, and later the Counts Palatine (Dukes) of Zweibrücken, owned a great plot of land in Wahnwegen, which they lent a local family under an hereditary lease (Erbbestand). Besides having to pay taxes to the secular Vögte, the villagers also had to pay part of the fruits of their labours to the monks at the Monastery on the Remigiusberg. There was also an estate whose profits flowed to the priest.

=== Modern times ===
Wahnwegen shared Palatinate-Zweibrücken's history until that state fell in the time of the French Revolution. In the 1588 description of the Amt of Lichtenberg by Johannes Hoffmann, Wahnwegen was assigned to a side valley of the vierter Hauptgrund (“fourth main ground”) in the Oberamt of Lichtenberg, which corresponds exactly with the valley of the Bledesbach. Hoffmann described this dale as being 1,500 Schuch (“feet”) or 100 Rutten (“rods”) long. This would make its length roughly 450 m. According to the 1609 Oberamt of Lichtenberg church Visitation protocol, 82 persons were then living in the village, making it one of the bigger villages in the parish of Kusel. It would seem that the village was not stricken with the Plague, for death rates in Wahnwegen during the worst Plague years were not particularly high. On the other hand, the Thirty Years' War struck the village particularly hard. While before the war there had been up to five births noted in the Kusel church books for Wahnwegen each year, from 1632 until the war ended in 1648, only one wedding was recorded, and only two births. Deaths were no longer being registered at all. Even for the decades following the war, the church books only record the odd entry about Wahnwegen. Only in 1668 – twenty years after the Thirty Years' War had ended – were three births in one year recorded, which had been average before the war. There was not as much hardship to bear, however, in King Louis XIV's wars of conquest, although perhaps it was a hardship that the village's population had only risen back up to 15 by that time. During the 18th century, population figures swiftly climbed until at the turn of the 19th century, there were 300 people in Wahnwegen.

==== Recent times ====
The French Revolution put an end to the Duchy of Palatinate-Zweibrücken towards the end of the 18th century. The German lands on the Rhine’s left bank were annexed by France. Between 1801 and 1814, Wahnwegen lay in the Department of Sarre and the Mairie (“Mayoralty”) of Quirnbach in the Canton of Kusel and the Arrondissement of Birkenfeld. In the time that followed, after Napoleonic times and under the terms of the Congress of Vienna, Wahnwegen belonged to the Kingdom of Bavaria, within which it found itself in the Bürgermeisterei (“Mayoralty”) of Quirnbach and the Canton and Landkommissariat (later Bezirksamt and Landkreis, or “district”) of Kusel. In the early 1930s, the Nazi Party (NSDAP) became quite popular in Wahnwegen. In the 1930 Reichstag elections, 3% of the local votes went to Adolf Hitler’s party, but by the time of the 1933 Reichstag elections, after Hitler had already seized power, local support for the Nazis had swollen to 36.1%. Hitler’s success in these elections paved the way for his Enabling Act of 1933 (Ermächtigungsgesetz), thus starting the Third Reich in earnest. In the course of administrative restructuring in Rhineland-Palatinate, Wahnwegen was grouped as a self-administering Ortsgemeinde into the Verbandsgemeinde of Glan-Münchweiler in 1972.

=== Population development ===
Wahnwegen was, even into the 19th century, a village characterized by agriculture, in which, however, the share of the population represented by workers in other industries began to rise considerably quite early on. There was work at the nearby stone quarries and in the collieries and ironworks in the Saarland. Today, most villagers only live in the village, commuting to jobs elsewhere. As for religious affiliation, most villagers are Evangelical.

The following table shows population development over the centuries for Wahnwegen, with some figures broken down by religious denomination:

Year	1609	1825	1835	1971	1905	1939	1961	2003	2008
Total	82	282	391	462	601	732	799	804	752
Catholic		33					68
Evangelical		249					712
other or none							19

=== Municipality’s name ===
The village's name, Wahnwegen, means an den Wagenwegen, or “on the wain ways” (or for “wain”, read “wagon”, “cart”, “carriage”, etc., as Wagen can mean all these things in German). This refers to the village's location at a crossroads, where mediaeval roads crossed. The name first appears as Wanwgen in 1446 in a steward's account from Lichtenberg Castle. That same year, the name also cropped up in documents as Wanwinden, Wangwegen and Wernswinden. It was also called Wangwegen in 1578. The interpretation of the name's meaning as something to do with the old crossroads is not shared by all researchers. Alternative interpretations see the first syllable as coming from a personal name, perhaps Werni, and the ending —wegen or —winden as meaning bei den Weiden (“by the meadows”, or perhaps “by the willows”).

=== Vanished villages ===
Vanishing long ago was the village of Derschbach, which lay north of Wahnwegen. It had its first documentary mention in 1445 (slightly earlier than Wahnwegen itself), but by the early 16th century, it had been forsaken by its inhabitants. The name supposedly goes back to a Celtic word for “body of water”, onto which the German placename ending —bach was added.

== Religion ==
Wahnwegen lay in the Remigiusland, and thereby was originally subject to the lordship of the Bishopric of Reims, but in terms of ecclesiastical administration, it belonged to the Archbishopric of Mainz. Going by the then customary principle of cuius regio, eius religio, when the Reformation was introduced about 1534, all subjects, as required by the newly converted Ducal administration, likewise had to convert, to Lutheranism, and then in 1588, on Count Palatine Johannes I's orders, to Calvinism. After the Thirty Years' War, it was theoretically possible to choose one's religion, although the villagers in Wahnwegen remained overwhelmingly Calvinist, or at least generally Protestant after the Lutheran and Reformed faiths were united in 1817. From the Middle Ages, the villagers were members of the Church of Kusel. In 1869, the villages of Wahnwegen and Hüffler joined together into their own parish, ministering to which was a vicar who was responsible only for these two villages. The school in the neighbouring village of Hüffler made a room available for church services. Today, there is also a municipal building in Wahnwegen at the Evangelical church's disposal. Otherwise the original arrangement remains unchanged. The village's Catholic Christians belong, as they always have, to the parish of Kusel.

== Politics ==
=== Municipal council ===
The council is made up of 12 council members, who were elected by majority vote at the municipal election held on 7 June 2009, and the honorary mayor as chairman.

=== Mayor ===
Wahnwegen's mayor is Rene Morgenstern.

=== Coat of arms ===
The municipality's arms might be described thus: Argent a wheel spoked of eight azure.

The arms go back to a seal used in 1747. The single charge in the arms, an eight-spoked wheel, is a reference to the municipality's name, derived, it is believed, from the village's having arisen at a crossroads that would have seen traffic equipped with such wheels, namely Wagen (from which the first syllable Wahn— supposedly derives). The wheel's tincture, azure (blue), refers to the arms once borne by the Counts of Veldenz. The arms have been borne since 1979 when they were approved by the now defunct Rheinhessen-Pfalz Regierungsbezirk administration in Neustadt an der Weinstraße. Besides the coat of arms, Wahnwegen also has a flag with the same blue wheel on a gold field. This was approved in 1988.

== Culture and sightseeing ==
=== Buildings ===
The following are listed buildings or sites in Rhineland-Palatinate’s Directory of Cultural Monuments:

- Friedhofstraße 5 – Quereinhaus (a combination residential and commercial house divided for these two purposes down the middle, perpendicularly to the street), 18th century, expansion in the 19th century; characterizes street’s appearance

=== Regular events ===
Wahnwegen holds its kermis (church consecration festival, locally known as the Kerwe) on the fourth Sunday in September.

=== Clubs ===
The following clubs are currently active in Wahnwegen:

- SPD local association (founded in 1910)
- Sängervereinigung (singing club, 1909)
- Fruitgrowing and gardening club (1929)
- Sport club (1946, together with Hüffler)
- Shooting club (1952)
- Countrywomen’s club (1953)
- Pensioners’ club (1959)
- Volunteer fire brigade (1965)
- Pfälzer-Wald-Verein (hiking club, 1975)
- Nursing association (~1975)
- Theatre group (1985)
- FCK fanclub (1986)

== Economy and infrastructure ==
=== Economic structure ===
Agriculture, which dominated Wahnwegen's economic life well into the 20th century, plays only a subordinate role in today's economy. Only two businesses earn money mainly from agriculture nowadays. Most workers commute to jobs outside the village, to Kusel, Kaiserslautern, and the Saarland. A series of independent businesses can be found in the village: a grocer’s shop, a butcher’s shop, two inns, a bank branch, the postal agency, a hairdresser’s, a concert artists’ agency, a driving school, an agency for a department store business, a haulage company and two distilleries.

=== Education ===
From the time of the Reformation, the government of the Duchy of Palatinate-Zweibrücken sought to spread schooling throughout the country, so that the subjects could independently understand Holy Writ. It was a long time, though, before the goal was generally reached. In 1712, a winter school (one geared towards a farming community's practical needs, held in the winter when farm families had more time) came into being in Hüffler for the villages of Hüffler, Wahnwegen and Schellweiler; the teacher was Johann Güneyssen. Wahnwegen tried to set up its own school in 1750, but was met with refusal from the highest consistory. Because of a dispute over the school wood in the three villages, local education suffered a far-reaching setback. Instead of the 50 pupils who were supposed to attend lessons, only seven did so. In 1783, a new schoolhouse for the three villages was built in Hüffler, although Schellweiler had, in the foregoing year, founded its own winter school. Only in 1811 did Wahnwegen cut its ties with the three-village school arrangement, and it was likely that schooling was then done, at first, in a private house. In 1825, the village got its own school, which was later expanded with another schoolroom. A new schoolhouse was dedicated in 1901, and this one was given a third classroom in 1960. Since the 1971-1972 school year, schoolchildren have been attending classes in Hüffler, while Hauptschule students have been going to Herschweiler-Pettersheim. The former Wahnwegen schoolhouse is now used as a kindergarten for Wahnwegen and Hüffler.

=== Transport ===
Wahnwegen lies on Landesstraße 360 (Kusel-Wahnwegen), which south of the village meets Landesstraße 352 (Quirnbach-Frohnhofen). It also lies on Kreisstraßen (District Roads) 19 (to Herschweiler-Pettersheim) and 20 (to Konken). To the northeast runs the Autobahn A 62 (Kaiserslautern–Trier); the Kusel interchange is about 7 km away. The nearest stations are Glan-Münchweiler station and Kusel station, which both lie on the Landstuhl–Kusel railway.

== Famous people ==
=== Famous people associated with the municipality ===
- Walter Mannweiler (b. 1901 in Pirmasens; d. 1960 in Solothurn)

A theologian and a writer, Mannweiler was from 1929 to 1934 vicar and church administrator in the parish of Hüffler-Wahnwegen, whereafter he became a pastor in Switzerland, last of all in Solothurn. He compiled uplifting written works, and under the pseudonym “Rhenanus” he was for many years a contributor to the magazine Leben und Glauben (“Living and Believing”).
