= Quirnbach, Kusel =

Quirnbach/Pfalz
- Municipality
- Coat of arms

- Location of Quirnbach/Pfalz within Kusel district
- Interactive map of Quirnbach/Pfalz
- Location within Germany Location within Rhineland-Palatinate
- Coordinates: 49°28′25.428″N 7°25′15.550″E
- Country: Germany
- State: Rhineland-Palatinate
- District: Kusel
- Municipal assoc.: Oberes Glantal
- Subdivisions: 2

Government
  - Mayor (2019–24): Stefanie Körbel

Area
  - Total: 6.1 km^{2} (2.4 sq mi)
- Elevation: 242 m (794 ft)

Population (2025-12-31)
  - Total: 474
  - Density: 78/km^{2} (200/sq mi)
- Time zone: UTC+01:00 (CET)
  - Summer (DST): UTC+02:00 (CEST)
- Postal codes: 66909
- Dialling codes: 06383
- Vehicle registration: KUS
- Website: www.quirnbach-pfalz.de

Quirnbach/Pfalz (German pronunciation: [ˈkvɪʁnbax]) is an Ortsgemeinde – a municipality belonging to a Verbandsgemeinde, a kind of collective municipality – in the Kusel district in Rhineland-Palatinate, Germany. It belongs to the Verbandsgemeinde Oberes Glantal.

== Geography ==
=== Location ===
The municipality lies just west of Glan-Münchweiler in the Western Palatinate. Quirnbach lies at an elevation of 223 m above sea level and the outlying centre of Liebsthal at an elevation of 251 m above sea level in the valley of the Wehrbach, a side valley of the Henschbach. To the east, it is bordered by the Steinerner Mann (“Stone Man”; 329 m) and a ridge that runs farther to the valley's north end, to the Schindelberg (379 m) and the Dellmesrech (390 m). Guarding the west are the Kirchberg (349 m) and the heights of the Sangerhof (378 m). One particular reference point is the 390 m-long Henschbachtalbrücke (Henschbach Valley Bridge) on the way into Quirnbach. The municipal area measures 610 ha, of which 46 ha is wooded, 14 ha is taken up by the Autobahn and 8 ha is taken up by the outlying centre of Liebsthal.

=== Neighbouring municipalities ===
Quirnbach borders in the north on the municipality of Rehweiler, in the southeast on the municipality of Glan-Münchweiler, in the south on the municipality of Henschtal, in the southwest on the municipality of Wahnwegen and in the northwest on the municipality of Hüffler.

=== Constituent communities ===
Quirnbach's Ortsteile are Quirnbach and Liebsthal.

=== Municipality’s layout ===
As early as the Middle Ages, Quirnbach's inhabitants settled at the lower end of the Wehrbach valley around the church. This was newly built in 1777 on the site where an old chapel had once stood. Next to it was built the school, which 120 years later served as the town hall. It now serves as a village community centre, used jointly by the municipality and the parish. On the way into the village in the Henschbach valley, standing at the former mill is an ancient limetree, which enjoys conservational protection. In the early 20th century, the through road leading to Herschweiler-Pettersheim was realigned to allow for a new residential area. It was here that the municipality opened up its first new residential area after 1950, called “Auf Löbsch”. Since the cattle markets kept shrinking, even the old marketplace lands were built up in the mid 1950s. In 1964, a new school was built on Trahweiler Weg, but this only served for eight years before falling victim to the axe of school reform. Located there now is a small business furnishing 8 to 10 jobs. In 1970, it became possible with the consequent freeing up of new land to build the new marketplace, complete with a market hall, and a playground. A football pitch was laid out for youth, thus sparing them the trip to the sporting ground out in the Altenwald (forest). A bigger new building zone, “Auf Dungen”, sprang up in 1997, and is still being expanded. Quirnbach's southern limit is the Henschbach. Beginning in the Middle Ages, this was also the border between Palatinate-Zweibrücken domain on the one side and House of Leyen domain on the other. To the east, the municipal area is sundered by the broad band of the Autobahn A 62 (Kaiserslautern–Trier) cutting right across it. To the north, the old Roman road is a “natural” boundary and to the west, parts of the municipal area reach into the Hodenbach valley. Agriculture nowadays plays only a minor part in Quirnbach's life, with only one farm run as the farmer's primary occupation, while three others are run as secondary occupations.

== History ==
=== Antiquity ===
Within Liebsthal's limits, a Stone Age hatchet was found, although its whereabouts are today unknown. Three Bronze Age or Stone Age barrows can also be found within Liebsthal's limits, only one of which is preserved in its original condition. Among the rubble heaps in Quirnbach may lie some prehistoric barrows, but most of these are likely indeed tailing heaps from the former mining industry here. The area was settled by the Romans in ancient times, as witnessed by many archaeological finds (however, these have only been made in the municipal areas of the neighbouring villages of Wahnwegen and Hüffler). Along the northern municipal limit runs what is known to be a Roman road that led from Waldmohr to Kusel. After the fall of the Roman Empire, Frankish settlers came to the area.

=== Middle Ages ===
Places with names ending in —bach (“—brook”) were founded beginning in the 9th century. In 1152, Quirnbach had its first documentary mention as Querenbach. According to the document in question, Emperor Friedrich Barbarossa acknowledged to Abbot Hugo of the Abbey of Saint-Remi his ownership of the Remigiusland. The document goes on to name every ecclesiastical place in the Remigiusland, one of which was Quirnbach, then known as Querenbach. The document's contents are preserved only in a 13th-century copy. Liebsthal had its first documentary mention as Lybestatt in 1349. In 1154, Quirnbach appeared as Kerembac in the Polyptichum (directory of holdings) kept by the Archishopric of Reims. Since the entries in this book deal with matters stretching back a great length of time, it could be that Quirnbach held some importance for Reims as far back as the Early Middle Ages as a village in the so-called Remigiusland. In the earlier half of the 12th century, the Counts of Veldenz took over the Remigiusland as a Vogtei, and thereafter these counts – and later the Dukes of Palatinate-Zweibrücken – were named as landed lords together with the Abbey of Saint-Remi. In this Veldenz time, the village gave a noble family its name. Named as members of this family were Konrad von Quirnbach (1152), Wolfram von Quirnbach (1196) and Ulrich von Quirnbach (1255), who was cathedral canon at Speyer and Abbot of Limburg. In 1444, the County of Veldenz met its end when Count Friedrich III of Veldenz died without a male heir. His daughter Anna wed King Ruprecht's son Count Palatine Stephan. By uniting his own Palatine holdings with the now otherwise heirless County of Veldenz – his wife had inherited the county, but not her father's title – and by redeeming the hitherto pledged County of Zweibrücken, Stephan founded a new County Palatine, as whose comital residence he chose the town of Zweibrücken: the County Palatine – later Duchy – of Palatinate-Zweibrücken. Within this state, Quirnbach found itself within the Oberamt of Lichtenberg. Also in 1444, Quirnbach's market was first named when the Duke sent his court butcher there to buy livestock. The next record after that is found in the lordly wine cellars’ accounts from the Oberamt of Lichtenberg, which stated that at Saint Bartholomew's Market (Bartholomäusmarkt), three Fuder and two and a half Ohm (that is, roughly 3 150 L) of lordly wine had been tapped. Quirnbach's best known market, and the only one that is still held, is the Quirnbacher Pferdemarkt (“Horse Market”).

The little farming village of Liebsthal, which until 1975 was a self-administering municipality, was also in earlier times tightly bound with its bigger neighbour, Quirnbach. The village gets its name from the Lords of Liebsthal, who had been enfeoffed by the Counts of Veldenz. Their seat was at a now vanished hill castle, the Burg Liebsthal, on hilly land now called the Schlossberg – “Castle Mountain”.

=== Modern times ===
Quirnbach kept its importance as a parish hub and a major market village throughout the Middle Ages. Even its place in the then dominant feudal structure did not change. Nonetheless, an end was put to any development time and again by the 16th century's wars (the Thirty Years' War and French King Louis XIV’s wars of conquest), particularly any population growth. Only in the 18th century did a continuous population growth once again set in, continuing until feudalism itself was swept away in the events of the French Revolution.

==== Recent times ====
After France had annexed the German lands on the Rhine’s left bank, Quirnbach, now the seat of a mairie (“mayoralty”), lay in the Canton of Kusel, the Arrondissement of Birkenfeld and the Department of Sarre. Also belonging to the Mairie of Quirnbach were the villages of Hüffler, Wahnwegen, Liebsthal, Rehweiler, Trahweiler with Sangerhof and Frutzweiler. In 1814, the French were driven out, and after a transitional period, the Baierischer Rheinkreis (Bavarian Rhine District) was founded, which was later called the Rheinpfalz (Rhenish Palatinate). By any name, though, it was the territory on the Rhine that the Congress of Vienna awarded to the Kingdom of Bavaria. As of 1816, Quirnbach and Liebsthal lay within this new Bavarian exclave in the Canton of Kusel and the Landcommissariat of Kusel, with Quirnbach retaining its status as a mayoral seat, although the official term for this was now German instead of French: Bürgermeisterei. During the Palatine-Badish Uprising in 1849, Quirnbach played a special role through Mayor Jakob Munzinger's activities. Munzinger represented the Canton of Kusel in the Revolutionary Government in Kaiserslautern. In the mid 19th century, Quirnbach held the right to hold 24 markets each year. In 1877, for the first time, the horse market was held on Penance Day, the Wednesday before 23 November (this day is known in Germany as Buß- und Bettag, an Evangelical observance), for which 24,000 lots were sold throughout the Palatinate. Today, the horse market is only held on the second Wednesday in November, once again tied to a lottery. Territorial changes in the region came in the course of administrative restructuring in Rhineland-Palatinate beginning in 1968. It was only in 1972 that Quirnbach lost its function as a mayoral seat, which was now taken over by the then newly founded Verbandsgemeinde of Glan-Münchweiler. Meanwhile, Quirnbach and Liebsthal were both dissolved as municipalities. On 9 March 1975, the municipality of Quirnbach bei Kusel was newly formed out of these two dissolved municipalities, and on 1 May 1976, the name was changed to Quirnbach/Pfalz.

=== Population development ===
About 1800, 500 people lived in Quirnbach proper while 160 lived in outlying Liebsthal. The population figures rose continually, albeit slowly, in the 19th century, only to sink somewhat towards the end of the century because of emigration and loss of population to the nearby Saarland. In the 20th century, there was once again considerable population growth, although the trend was not likely to have held. The village itself was a farming village with a few small craft businesses. Beginning in 1900, many villagers were employed at the mine or the ironworks. The village, though, was also blessed with a great number of inns because it was such an active market centre. In 1911, there were eleven of these, in a village whose population was roughly 450. With depletion of Saar collieries and the closure of ironworks there, many people from Quirnbach lost their jobs. Almost all farmers forsook their farms and found work with the Americans. Today, most people are employed in the Kaiserslautern area.

The following table shows population development over the centuries for Quirnbach, with some figures broken down by religious denomination, and including figures for the outlying centre of Liebsthal after 1961:

| Year | 1825 | 1835 | 1871 | 1905 | 1939 | 1961 | 1997 | 2008 |
| Total | 322 | 406 | 446 | 442 | 459 | 486 | 569 | 558 |
| Catholic | 5 | | | | | 25 | 68 | 76 |
| Evangelical | 17 | | | | | 454 | 426 | 329 |
| Jewish | 9 | | | | | – | – | – |
| Other | | | | | | 7 | 75 | 153 |

The following table shows population development over the centuries for Liebsthal up to 1961, with some figures broken down by religious denomination:

| Year | 1825 | 1835 | 1871 | 1905 | 1939 | 1961 |
| Total | 127 | 144 | 150 | 125 | 148 | 170 |
| Catholic | 3 | | | | | 7 |
| Evangelical | 124 | | | | | 163 |

=== Municipality’s names ===
Quirnbach was at first only a brook's name, and it was so called by villagers in Rehweiler, Trahweiler and Frutzweiler, too. As early as 1588, Johannes Hofmann wrote in his description of the Oberamt of Lichtenberg: “The Heinsbach (Henschbach) empties into the Glan taking up the Quirnbach before this. That is today’s Wehrbach, whose name became through Quirnbach and Querbach, Wehrbach. The course of the brook, which empties into the Henschbach at a right angle but runs slantwise to the Henschbach, may have been the reason it was given this name.” Hofmann was referring to the German word quer, which can mean either “slantwise” or “at a right angle”. Actually, Quirn or Kurn is an old German word for a mill (cognate with the English word “quern”). The Quirnbach was therefore a brook on which stood many mills. Names that the village has borne over time are Querenbach (1152), Kerembac (1154) and Quirnbach (1588). Liebsthal was originally called Liebesstatt (in 1349 Lybestatt), and thus the settlement, perhaps a castle, bore a name that was meant to be understood as “Liebo’s Place”. The placename ending —statt changed over time into —stall along the lines of the neighbouring vanished village of Leidentall, and then to —tal or —thal (“dale”). Hence, the name Liebsthal only first cropped up in the 19th century.

== Religion ==
Tightly bound with secular events was Quirnbach's ecclesiastical development. Mentioned as the first Protestant pastor in 1538 was Oswald Scherer, the overseer of the Kapell Quirenbach (chapel). The Quirnbach clergyman Emil Müller wrote in his chronicle in 1890 that there had been an autonomous parish in Quirnbach even before the Reformation. The oldest record relevant to this states that after the Reverend Kayser's death on 15 March 1518, his post was awarded to the priest Lorenz from Altenglan by the Papal Prothonotary Marianus Carraciolus. Hence, there was then already a church in the village; it is described as Saint Bartholomew's (Bartholomäuskirche). In May 1773, the then pastor Heintz reported that the church was threatening to cave in on three sides. In 1777, work finally began on building a new church, the one that still stands today. It was consecrated on 6 December 1778. The church has no belltower, but is rather a typical village church with a ridge turret instead. The village was still thoroughly Evangelical in 1900. In the Second World War, two of the church's three bells were taken away to be melted down, but these were replaced in the 1950s. The church lost many of its former characteristic peculiarities in the thorough renovation work done on it in the 1960s, but perhaps a bit of this was regained when the “Luther Window”, which had gone missing at the time of the renovations, was reinstalled. Today, 75% of the inhabitants are Evangelical, 15% are Catholic and 10% belong to other faiths or profess none. Now belonging to the Evangelical parish are the municipalities of Steinbach with Frutzweiler, Henschtal with Sangerhof, Quirnbach with Liebsthal and Rehweiler. The Catholics attend church in Glan-Münchweiler.

== Politics ==
=== Municipal council ===
The council is made up of 12 council members, who were elected by majority vote at the municipal election held on 7 June 2009, and the honorary mayor as chairman.

=== Mayor ===
Quirnbach's mayor is Stefanie Körbel.

=== Coat of arms ===
The municipality's arms might be described thus: Or a lion rampant reguardant sable armed and langued gules.

The lone charge in these arms, a lion looking back over his shoulder (“reguardant”) is drawn from an old seal, although the tinctures have been transposed, for the seal in question showed a gold lion on a black field. According to Karl Heinz Debus, author of Das große Wappenbuch der Pfalz (“The Great Armorial Book of the Palatinate”, Neustadt an der Weinstraße 1988), the first form of the arms was approved by the Government of Bavaria in 1937, and the second form is supposedly now only still in use as a matter of custom. In the village itself, this interpretation is denied.

== Culture and sightseeing ==
=== Buildings ===
The following are listed buildings or sites in Rhineland-Palatinate’s Directory of Cultural Monuments:

==== Quirnbach (main centre) ====
- Protestant parish church, Marktstraße 4 – aisleless church with ridge turret, 1777/1778, architect Philipp Heinrich Hellermann, Zweibrücken; furnishings, Walcker organ from 1872
- Hauptstraße 18 – sandstone-framed building with hipped roof on stone-block pedestal, 1856
- Marktstraße 2 – former school; building with hipped roof on high quarrystone pedestal, 1837/1838, architect possibly Johann Schmeisser, Kusel; characterizes village’s appearance
- Schulstraße 6 – Protestant rectory; plastered building on pedestal, 1849, one-and-a-half-floor stable-barn

==== Liebsthal ====
- Siedlungsstraße 3 – hook-shaped estate; complex with single roof peak, 1850, timber-frame shed

=== Regular events ===
The whole Quirnbach area celebrates on the second Sunday in August the Quermbacher Kerb, as the kermis (church consecration festival) is known in the local speech. Formerly, the kermis’s timing was reckoned by Saint Bartholomew’s Day (24 August), which meant that it fell on either the third or the fourth Sunday in the month. Out of economic considerations, the new timing was chosen a few years ago. Even weeks beforehand, the Straußburschen and Straußmädchen (“bouquet lads and lasses”) meet to tie bands onto the Kerwestrauß (“kermis bouquet” – which is, in fact, a tree). Also in this time, the Kerweredd (“kermis speech”) is put together to be called out on Kermis Sunday at the market hall. It summarizes the year's events in the village. It also takes the odd poke at certain villagers with a moral, but humorous, “sermon”. The kermis lasts until Tuesday evening (Dienstagowent in the local speech). There is another dance and at nightfall, the kermis is “buried”. In the graveside speech, the events during the kermis are reported in humorous fashion, and amid the bouquet lads’ howling and loud music, the villagers return to their dancing. The kermis is hardly over before the villagers begin to ready themselves for the next festival, one for which Quirnbach is known far and wide: its yearly Horse Market (Quirnbacher Pferdemarkt), held on the second Wednesday in November. It is regularly attended by 19,000 to 30,000 people. Early on, the sale begins of the Quirnbacher Lotterie, as do the organizational preparations, which demand every villager's efforts. On the new marketplace and the village streets, some 75 to 80 sales booths are set up, a great horse show is staged and the lottery winner is drawn under the marquee. Without the local clubs’ collaboration, staging the Horse Market would be impossible.

=== Clubs ===
The Quirnbach singing club has been in existence for 125 years, the workers’ support club for 100 and the sport club for 50. Many villagers, though, are also members of several other clubs.

== Economy and infrastructure ==
=== Economic structure ===
Quirnbach was known throughout the Middle Rhine region and far into Lotharingia as a market village. The village was also the hub of Glan-Donnersberger cattle breeding country. Until the Second World War, the village's economic mainstay was agriculture, although many workers also commuted to work at the mines, ironworks and foundries in the Saarland. After the war, the villagers saw their farming village transform itself into a service-sector village. Besides one farm, there are today 13 craft and retail businesses in Quirnbach, working at which is no small number of commuters from elsewhere. Likewise, many people from Quirnbach travel to jobs in industry in Kaiserslautern, Homburg and even Ludwigshafen.

=== Education ===
In 1798, Quirnbach had a one-room schoolhouse. In 1840, the old schoolhouse was torn down and a new one with a teacher's dwelling was built. Attached to this, in the lower rooms, were a stable and a small barn. In those days, schoolteachers had to earn extra income by farming a plot, as did the village pastor, who in 1840 likewise got a new rectory, complete with a stable and a barn. In 1910, the school was split into two classes, but there was still only one schoolteacher, who then had to handle each class in shifts. In 1933, year level 8 was introduced, and was attended by pupils from Quirnbach, Rehweiler and Liebsthal. In 1929, Liebsthal got a new schoolhouse and Quirnbach got a new teacher's dwelling. In 1964, a new school was dedicated, but this was closed only eight years later, in 1972, as was the school in Liebsthal. The children from the then newly merged municipality now attend kindergarten, primary school or Hauptschule in Glan-Münchweiler.

=== Transport ===
With help from the municipality of Quirnbach, the Kuseler Land (region around Kusel) was opened to transport in 1868 by the Landstuhl–Kusel railway. In the neighbouring villages of Rehweiler and Glan-Münchweiler, loading ramps were installed to enable better service to the markets in Quirnbach by improving livestock delivery. Running by the village is Bundesstraße 423, leading from Altenglan to Sarreguemines, while through the village itself runs the linking road from Rehweiler to Herschweiler-Pettersheim, Landesstraße 352. Directly north lies the Autobahn A 62 (Kaiserslautern–Trier), the nearest interchange onto which is found in neighbouring Glan-Münchweiler, 3 km away. Serving nearby Glan-Münchweiler and Rehweiler are railway stations on the Landstuhl–Kusel railway, served by the hourly Regionalbahn service RB 67, called the Glantalbahn, even though this name refers to a largely closed railway line, part of which is still used by this service, which also runs through to Kaiserslautern. Bus links lead by way of Wahnwegen to Kusel and by way of Brücken to Homburg.

== Famous people ==
=== Sons and daughters of the town ===
- Hermann August Maurer (b. 1861; d. 1934 in Landau)

Himself a clergyman and famous painter, Maurer’s father was the deacon Karl Konrad Ludwig Maurer (see below), who from 1854 to 1862 worked in Quirnbach as a pastor. The younger Maurer, while born in Quirnbach, spent his youth in Bergzabern and attended the Gymnasium in Landau. He studied theology and after several lesser posts became pastor in Annweiler in 1887. The church’s governing body raised him to the church council in 1925.

- Karl Munzinger (b. 1864; d. 1937 in Heidelberg)

Jakob Munzinger’s grandson (see below) and Adolf Munzinger’s son, like his grandfather, Munzinger was the mayor, a farmer, an innkeeper and a brewer in Quirnbach. He studied theology, was beginning in 1887 a parochial administrator in Otterberg and Bosenbach and a town vicar in Kusel. From 1889 to 1895, he was a missionary in Japan. Back in Germany, he became pastor in Sausenheim and Zweibrücken, and eventually deacon in Kusel and Landau, then church councillor and chief church councillor. The Universities of Strasbourg and Heidelberg both awarded him honorary doctorates. During the French occupation after the First World War, he turned against the Separatists’ efforts. He also made a name for himself as a writer.

=== Famous people associated with the municipality ===
- Karl Konrad Ludwig Maurer (b. 1819 in Lauenstein; d. in Bad Bergzabern)

Pastor from 1854 to 1862 in Quirnbach, Maurer was also the pastor and “Wasgau Painter” Hermann August Maurer’s father (see above). He moved from Quirnbach to Bergzabern, where he concerned himself with the town’s history and the care of the poor. He held important positions in several Protestant associations.

- Emil Müller (b. 1864 in Eppstein; d. 1918 in Münchweiler an der Alsenz)

As a clergyman, Müller was first a town vicar in Kaiserslautern, then an administrator in Göllheim and Quirnheim, where the Church turned the pastor’s post over to him in 1890. In 1901, he moved to Sausenheim, and in 1908 to Münchweiler an der Alsenz. Müller busied himself with a secondary occupation in writing and put together, among other things, writings about the Kuseler Land’s regional history, such as Der Brand von Kusel im Jahre 1794 (“The Fire of Kusel in the Year 1794”) and Kleine Dorfgeschichte von Quirnbach (“Little Village History of Quirnbach”).

- Jakob Munzinger (b. 1807 in Gerhardsbrunn; d. 1874 in Quirnbach)

As a Gerhardsbrunn farmer’s son, Munzinger wed Karoline Drum from Quirnbach, a farmer’s, innkeeper’s and brewer’s daughter. In Quirnbach, Munzinger assumed the mayor’s office. He advanced the ideas of the Palatine Uprising in 1849 and voted as a representative of the Canton of Kusel in May against the cantonal council’s proposal to put into place a state defence board, and for the founding of a provisory government. He thereby actively supported the planned uprising, and was later arrested because of his vote and tried at Zweibrücken, where he was acquitted after he had distanced himself from his original revolutionary ideas. He could, however, no longer thereafter exercise the office of mayor, and this was taken over by his son Adolf, and held by him until his own death in 1892.

- The Goeddel Family
