= Haschbach =

Haschbach can refer to two places in the Kusel district in Rhineland-Palatinate, Germany:

- Haschbach am Remigiusberg, a self-administering municipality
- Haschbach am Glan, a constituent community of Henschtal
