= Rehweiler =

- Municipality
- Coat of arms

- Location of Rehweiler within Kusel district
- Interactive map of Rehweiler
- Location within Germany Location within Rhineland-Palatinate
- Coordinates: 49°29′7.82″N 7°26′29.94″E
- Country: Germany
- State: Rhineland-Palatinate
- District: Kusel
- Municipal assoc.: Oberes Glantal

Government
  - Mayor (2019–24): Frank Scholz

Area
  - Total: 6.74 km^{2} (2.60 sq mi)
- Elevation: 220 m (720 ft)

Population (2025-12-31)
  - Total: 419
  - Density: 62.2/km^{2} (161/sq mi)
- Time zone: UTC+01:00 (CET)
  - Summer (DST): UTC+02:00 (CEST)
- Postal codes: 66907
- Dialling codes: 06383
- Vehicle registration: KUS
- Website: www.rehweiler.de

Rehweiler is an Ortsgemeinde – a municipality belonging to a Verbandsgemeinde, a kind of collective municipality – in the Kusel district in Rhineland-Palatinate, Germany. It belongs to the Verbandsgemeinde of Oberes Glantal.

== Geography ==
=== Location ===
The municipality lies in the Western Palatinate at a broadening of the Glan valley near the mouths of two brooks that empty into the Glan, the Rödelbach from the left and the Dorfbach from the right, roughly 210 m above sea level, while the settled parts of the flanking slopes reach some 300 m above sea level. The municipality's highest point, in the municipal area's far west, is 357 m above sea level. Near this peak runs the Autobahn A 62 (Kaiserslautern–Trier) for about one kilometre through the municipal area. Two continuous woodlands lie to the village's east (Bannbusch) and west (Brandenbusch). The municipal area measures 673 ha, of which 167 ha is wooded.

=== Neighbouring municipalities ===
Rehweiler borders in the north on the municipality of Theisbergstegen, in the northeast on the municipality of Matzenbach, in the east on the municipality of Niedermohr, in the south on the municipality of Glan-Münchweiler, in the southwest on the municipality of Quirnbach, in the west on the municipality of Hüffler and in the northwest on the municipality of Etschberg.

=== Constituent communities ===
Rehweiler's Ortsteile are Rehweiler (on the Glan's left bank) and Reichartsweiler (on the Glan's right bank). Although the merger took place 400 years ago, the two centres are even today clearly distinguished from each other.

=== Municipality’s layout ===
Rehweiler's two formerly separate parts, the former municipality of Reichartsweiler and the original Rehweiler, can still be made out separately even today. Reichartsweiler lies at the crossroads formed by the thoroughfare known as Hauptstraße (“Main Street”; Bundesstraße 423), and, to each side of this, Glanstraße and Steinrissstraße (“Stone Cleft Street”), both of which run parallel to the Dorfbach down to its mouth. A further street, named Hahnböschel, branches off Hauptstraße north of this crossing at the mountainside. The houses in the original Rehweiler, too, cluster around a crossroads, this one formed by Kuselbergstraße and Quirnbacher Straße running north-south, and Rödelbachstraße and Glanstraße on the river's left bank. While Kuselbergstraße towards its north end climbs up the mountain slope, branching off it in a straight line down in the valley is Eisenbacher-Straße. Not only the Glan, but the railway line, too, splits the two centres. The railway station stands in the village's south end, separated from the former Rehweiler Mühle (mill) by the railway embankment. The former school stands on the Glan's right bank near the bridge. From the older buildings in both the old villages, it can be seen that both are former farming villages. Among the many original farmhouses, one has even been preserved that has a crow-stepped gable. New building zones stretch mainly at the ends of the village in the east and the northwest on Kuselbergweg (street).

== History ==
=== Antiquity ===
Bearing witness to early human habitation in what is now Rehweiler is an archaeological find made in 1938: While destroying a barrow from La Tène times (about 400 BC) inside the Reichsarbeitsdienst camp (now SpVgg Rehweiler-Matzenbach's sporting ground), a human skeleton, a narrow-necked bottle and four heavily oxidized bronze armrings were found by the resident Nazis. These are now kept at the Historisches Museum der Pfalz (“Historical Museum of the Palatinate”) in Speyer. Rehweiler was also settled in Roman times. This is known from the stone found in 1790 up from the village in the Brandenbösch, which bore a Roman inscription that ran as follows: DEOMER. C. SEX. COTTIUSTASG. IL. LVSVS.L.M. (“To the god Mercury, C. Sextus Cottius…”). Furthermore, more than 20 Roman copper coins were found along with this stone. These Gallo-Roman finds were stored by Charles II August, Duke of Zweibrücken in his cabinet of rarities at Karlsberg Castle, his palatial country seat near Homburg, now in the Saarland. Unfortunately, this palace was burnt down in 1793 by French Revolutionary troops, and the Rehweiler finds seem to have been lost as a result. It is likely that there is still a Gallo-Roman estate – a so-called villa rustica – lying somewhere within Rehweiler's limits, waiting to be discovered.

=== Middle Ages ===
The villages of Leidenstall, Reichartsweiler and Rehweiler may have arisen in the expansion phase of the later Frankish colonization during the 10th century, but it is impossible to pinpoint exact founding dates. Whenever it happened, it can be assumed that Reichartsweiler and Rehweiler arose at the same time, and also that they originally formed a single village. The former may well have been the older of the two, and it seems to have got its name from an early settler named Richard. The vanished village of Kengerhausen may have been somewhat less old than the others. With the exception of Reichartsweiler, the villages lay in the so-called Remigiusland, the territory held by the Bishopric of Reims around Kusel and Altenglan, which in 952 was transferred into the ownership of the Abbey of Saint-Remi in Reims. Only Reichartsweiler lay outside this Remigiusland in the free Imperial domain of Kaiserslautern. In 1112, Count Emich's son, named Gerlach, from the Nahegau took over several Vogteien (security functions) over various lands held by ecclesiastical lordships (Mainz, Worms, Verdun, Reims), and out of these, together with some lands already under his own ownership in the Nahegau, he founded the so-called County of Veldenz, named after the Episcopal-Verdun holding around Schloss Veldenz on the river Moselle. Gerlach, who through this deed had become Count Gerlach I of Veldenz, had four successors who also bore the name Gerlach (the last of these, Gerlach V of the Older Line of the Counts of Veldenz, died in 1259). Some 200 years before this County of Veldenz was founded, Rehweiler and its neighbouring villages had already arisen. However, only under the Counts of the Newer County of Veldenz (1270-1444) did these villages’ names begin appearing in documents. Leidenstall was first in 1270. From this document the reader learns that Count Heinrich I of Veldenz, the founder of the newer comital line, sold the villages of Ysenbach (Eisenbach) and Leidenstall to the Count of Zweibrücken, and also that he ordered the Schultheiß in Kusel to pay interest on this in the amount of seven solidi in Trier funds to the provost at the Remigiusberg. According to a document dated 62 years later (1332) referring to Rewilir (Rehweiler), Kunigunde, who was the Kusel Schultheiß Ruso's widow, was allowed the tithes from the villages of Eisenbach and Rehweiler that the provost at the Remigiusberg had awarded to the mayor, even after her husband's death.

Only a few years after this first documentary mention of Rehweiler, Reichhartsweiler, the village across the Glan likewise passed to the County of Veldenz, and through a pledge of the free Imperial Ämter of Deinsberg (Theisbergstegen) and Reichenbach, to Count Georg I of Veldenz, who had succeeded Heinrich of Geroldseck. The exact year when this pledge was made is unknown, although it is, of course, known that it happened before 1347, when Georg I, perhaps, as the Landvogt of Speyer, the mightiest of all the Counts of Veldenz, died. While Rehweiler and the two other villages were now, as before, part of the Schultheißerei of Kusel, Reichartsweiler stayed with the pledged Ämter, which were later united into one Amt, the Reichenbacher Amt. The oldest surviving document that names Reichartsweiler dates from 1393, when Count Friedrich of Veldenz, the last count of the newer Veldenz line, set forth for his wife Margaretha a Wittum with income from the villages of Gimsbach, Bettenhausen and Reichartsweiler. In 1444, the County of Veldenz met its end when Count Friedrich III of Veldenz died without a male heir. His daughter Anna wed King Ruprecht's son Count Palatine Stephan. By uniting his own Palatine holdings with the now otherwise heirless County of Veldenz – his wife had inherited the county, but not her father's title – and by redeeming the hitherto pledged County of Zweibrücken, Stephan founded a new County Palatine, as whose comital residence he chose the town of Zweibrücken: the County Palatine – later Duchy – of Palatinate-Zweibrücken. All the villages that now lie within Rehweiler's limits then lay within this duchy, possibly including Kengerhausen and Leidenstall, but it is unknown when these two villages vanished. Thus, Rehweiler and the two now vanished villages still lay within the Remigiusland, in the Oberamt of Lichtenberg and the Schultheißerei of Pfeffelbach, but Reichartsweiler found itself in the Amt of Reichenbach.

=== Modern times ===
In 1543, Duke Wolfgang of Zweibrücken transferred lands to his uncle Ruprecht to found his own county palatine. These were the Ämter of Veldenz, Lauterecken, Jettenbach and Reichenbach, and later also Lützelstein in Alsace. This new county palatine bore the name Palatinate-Veldenz, and later also Palatinate-Veldenz-Lützelstein. It thus arose that Reichartsweiler found itself within this new county palatine with the residence town of Lauterecken. However, Wolfgang's successor Johannes I concluded a treaty on 14 August 1600 with Ruprecht's successor Georg Hans (Jerrihans) whereby, among other things, the villages of Haschbach and Stegen passed from Palatinate-Zweibrücken to Palatinate-Veldenz, against which Palatinate-Veldenz ceded the village of Reichartsweiler to Palatinate-Zweibrücken. At the same time, Rehweiler and its neighbouring village across the Glan, Reichartsweiler, were merged into a common village structure under the name Rehweiler. The name Reichartsweiler slowly disappeared from official documents, although church books kept mentioning it right up until 1700. According to the 1609 Church Visitation protocols of the Amt of Baumholder, 136 persons – 91 in Reichartsweiler and 45 in Rehweiler – were living in the united village at that time. Soon thereafter, though, came the Thirty Years' War, which struck Rehweiler very badly, as it did every other village in the area. While Rehweiler could still claim nine families, many other nearby villages were quite empty of people. Migration to the area helped raise the population levels, but French King Louis XIV's wars of conquest brought new hardship.

==== Recent times ====
Beginning in 1797, the Palatinate belonged to France, and Rehweiler belonged to the Mairie (“Mayoralty”) of Quirnbach, the Canton of Kusel, the Arrondissement of Birkenfeld and the Department of Sarre (whose capital was Trier). The mairie, at least, persisted even after Napoleonic French rule ended with the Battle of Waterloo and the Congress of Vienna, but it was now called the Bürgermeisterei of Quirnbach, although this literally means in German the same thing as the older, French term. In 1817, the Bürgermeisterei of Quirnbach passed to the Kingdom of Bavaria. In the late 1920s and early 1930s, the Nazi Party (NSDAP) became quite popular in Rehweiler. In the 1928 Reichstag elections, 1.7% of the local votes went to Adolf Hitler’s party, but by the 1930 Reichstag elections, this had grown to 12.3%. By the time of the 1933 Reichstag elections, after Hitler had already seized power, local support for the Nazis had swollen to 77.0%. Hitler's success in these elections paved the way for his Enabling Act of 1933 (Ermächtigungsgesetz), thus starting the Third Reich in earnest. The Mayoralty of Quirnbach lasted until administrative restructuring in Rhineland-Palatinate in 1972, when it was finally dissolved, and Rehweiler was grouped into the newly founded Verbandsgemeinde of Glan-Münchweiler.

=== Population development ===
Until the early 20th century, Rehweiler's inhabitants earned their living almost exclusively at agriculture, which then began to lose importance, finally usually only being pursued as a secondary occupation. Even before the First World War, many villagers had to earn their livelihoods as workers at stone quarries, Saarland mines and factories. Many members of the workforce today commute to work, making Rehweiler mainly a residential community for people in the most varied of occupations. The greater part of the population belongs to the Evangelical faith. Before the rise of the Third Reich, a few Jews also lived in the village. While in 1609 there were still 136 inhabitants in Rehweiler, by 1675 – only 27 years after the Thirty Years' War ended – there were only nine families left, and thus about 50 inhabitants. It was mainly newcomers who settled in the village who strongly boosted the population in the years leading up to 1688, but it shrank again in the wake of French King Louis XIV's wars of conquest. Then came steady growth, even though during the 18th century, nine families emigrated to North America. Between 1815 and 1835, there was yet more strong growth, followed by a fall in numbers due once again to emigration. There was another period of growth between 1900 and 1939, and then after the Second World War came ethnic Germans driven out of Germany's former eastern territories, looking for new homes. This also raised the population figures. Today, the trend is once again downward.

The following table shows population figures for Rehweiler over the centuries, and in some instances breaks the population down by religious affiliation. Figures marked with an F denote the number of families:

Year	1609	1675	1688	1693	1704	1815	1835	1905	1939	1961	2003	2008
Total	136	9 F	15 F	10 F	14 F	439	598	415	469	464	445	459
Catholic	–					30				38		106
Evangelical	136					405				419		241
Jewish	–					4				–		–
Other	–					–				7		112

=== Municipality’s name ===
Both Reichartsweiler and Rehweiler have the placename ending —weiler. As a standalone word, this means “hamlet” in Modern High German (but originally “homestead”). It can be traced to the Latin word villa (“estate”) and the German loanword villare. In both cases, the foregoing syllables come from personal names. According to researchers Dolch and Greule, Reichartsweiler may originally have been a homestead kept by somebody named Richard, and Rehweiler may likewise have been such a thing held by somebody named Raho, and nothing at all to do with roe deer (Reh in German); the charge in the coat of arms is merely a canting element. The name Reichartsweiler has appeared in several forms over the ages: Richartsvilr (1393), Rycharts wilre (1477), Richartzviller (1593). Likewise, Rehweiler has taken, among other forms: Rewilir (1332), Ruhwilr (1393), Rehwilre (1416), Rewiller (1436), Rehweiler (1586). Also according to Dolch and Greule, a man named “Baldemar von Rehweiler” mentioned sometime before 1296 has nothing to do with today's Rehweiler, but rather his name refers to a now vanished village in the Ohmbach valley.

=== Vanished villages ===
In the area north of the village of Rehweiler, in the valley of the Eisenbach, once lay the village of Kengerhausen, the likelihood being quite high that it was somewhere within Rehweiler's current limits. The village is only known from one mention in an historical document from 1588. It was likely actually a bigger than usual farmstead. Researchers Dolch and Greule construe the name as meaning a place Zu den Königsleuten (“At the King’s People”), which therefore would mean that it must have arisen before the founding of the Remigiusland in the Königsland. If Dolch's and Greule's interpretation is correct, Kengerhausen might well have been older than either Rehweiler or Reichartsweiler. The former village of Leidenstall, whose name can still be recognized in the cadastral name Leidstaler Hube (a field in the municipality), lay right at the municipal limit with Etschberg, but nonetheless within what is now Rehweiler. It was mentioned as early as 1270 as Leudenstall, which can be taken to mean “Luido’s Farm”. The ending —stall here means “place”, rather than “stable” as it usually does in modern-day German. This ending changed to —t(h)al (“dale” or “valley”) only much later. Forms of the name were, over the ages, as follows: Laidensthal (1446), Laidsthal (1484) and Leidsthal (1588). The 1588 form comes from Johannes Hoffmann's Beschreibung des Oberamtes Lichtenberg (“Description of the Oberamt of Lichtenberg”). By his time, the village had already vanished. It had supposedly burnt down one Sunday while all the villagers were attending church services in Kusel. Even then, a building was still standing near the village's location (but within Etschberg's limits), the so-called Huberhaus from which watch was kept over the surrounding forest. Later, a marksmen's clubhouse stood on the spot.

== Religion ==
During the Late Middle Ages, Rehweiler belonged to the church of Kusel, and Reichartsweiler to the church of Reichenbach; these both belonged to the Diocese of Mainz. When Duke Ludwig II of Zweibrücken converted to Martin Luther’s new teaching, the inhabitants of these villages, under the principle of cuius regio, eius religio, had to do likewise and adopt the Lutheran faith. In 1588, the subjects had to convert again, this time to John Calvin’s teaching, once Duke Johannes I had chosen Calvinism as his new belief. This, however, only applied to Rehweiler, and not to Reichartsweiler, for the latter belonged at this time to Palatinate-Veldenz. Only two years later, though, the two villages were merged, and then Reichartsweiler’s inhabitants likewise had to convert to Calvinism. After the Thirty Years' War, freedom of religion prevailed, and that led, during the occupation by King Louis XIV's troops, to the Catholic faith being once again more strongly supported. A further conversion to Lutheranism held little meaning for the villagers. Most kept to their Calvinist beliefs, and Catholic migrants, too, were settling in the village. The Evangelical Christians in the village today belong to the church of Quirnbach in the Protestant deaconry of Kusel, while the Catholics belong to the church of Glan-Münchweiler in the Catholic deaconry of Kusel.

== Politics ==
=== Municipal council ===
The council is made up of 8 council members, who were elected by majority vote at the municipal election held on 7 June 2009, and the honorary mayor as chairman.

=== Mayor ===
Rehweiler's mayor is Frank Scholz.

=== Coat of arms ===
The German blazon reads: Über erhöhtem Schildfuß, darin eine rote Bogenbrücke auf Silber, von Schwarz und Gold gespalten, darin ein Rehbock in verwechselter Tinktur.

The municipality's arms might in English heraldic language be described thus: Per pale sable and Or a roebuck at gaze counterchanged upon a bridge arched of three gules masoned sable spanning water argent.

The roebuck (Rehbock in German) is a canting charge for the municipality's name. The bridge is the one spanning the river Glan (the water in base), and symbolizes the link between the two formerly separate villages of Reichartsweiler and Rehweiler. The tinctures, sable and Or (black and gold), are those borne by the House of Wittelsbach, which held sway in both the Palatinate and the Duchy of Palatinate-Zweibrücken, the two states that also once divided the two centres between themselves.

Otto Hupp’s book Die Ortswappen und Gemeindesiegel der Rheinpfalz (“Municipal Arms and Seals of the Rhenish Palatinate”) published in 1928 displays an unapproved coat of arms for Rehweiler that might be described as “Argent a roebuck springing gules unguled Or” (that is, a red roebuck with gold hooves rearing on its hindlegs on a silver background).

An old seal from the 18th century shows a roebuck as a play on the name Rehweiler, which is actually not derived from the German word at all, but rather from an old Frankish personal name. Modelled on this seal was the coat of arms in Hupp's book, and modelled on this in turn was the current coat of arms, which has been borne by the municipality since 1987.

== Culture and sightseeing ==
=== Buildings ===
The following are listed buildings or sites in Rhineland-Palatinate’s Directory of Cultural Monuments:

- Am Kuselberg 1 – Quereinhaus (a combination residential and commercial house divided for these two purposes down the middle, perpendicularly to the street) with crow-stepped gable, marked 1821, expansion 1910
- Am Kuselberg 3 – hook-shaped estate, latter half of the 19th century; Quereinhaus, about 1875, two-floor stables, essentially from 1787 (?)
- Eisenbacher Weg 1 – stone oven pedestal, marked 1814
- Glanstraße 8 – former school; Baroque Revival building with hipped roof, 1907, architect Regional Master Builder Kleinhans, Kusel
- Glanstraße 14 – former mill; oilmill ruin, possibly from the latter half of the 18th century; protective house for the waterwheels, marked 1880; two-and-a-half-floor, wedge-shaped former gristmill, marked 1797 and 1890, commercial part from the earlier half of the 19th century; characterizes village’s appearance
- Quirnbacher Straße 2 – Quereinhaus, Late Classicist motifs, roof partly overhanging, marked 1899 (conversion), shed, about 1920
- Quirnbacher Straße 3 – Quereinhaus, latter half of the 18th century
- Rödelbach 5 – Quereinhaus, marked 1772 (stone oven pedestal), behind, former bakehouse

=== Regular events ===
The shift in population structure and the promotion of tourism have both breathed new life into Rehweiler’s cultural life. Nevertheless, the local clubs are still seen as the village’s main cultural support. Rehweiler holds its kermis (church consecration festival, locally known as the Kerb) on the first weekend in May, with Straußmädchen and Straußbuben (“bouquet girls” and “bouquet lads”), and also the Kerwerede (“kermis speech”). See the Regular events section in either the Niederalben or Quirnbach article for more about this. The old children's custom of the Pfingstquack at Whitsun has also been preserved. See Regular events in the Henschtal article for more about this.

=== Clubs ===
The following clubs are active in Rehweiler:

- Spielvereinigung Rehweiler-Matzenbach — sport club union with Matzenbach
- Schützenverein Edelweiß — shooting club
- Angelsportverein — angling club
- Gemischter Chor — mixed choir
- Landfrauenverein — countrywomen's club
- Arbeiterwohlfahrt — workers’ welfare
- Feuerwehr-Förderverein — fire brigade promotional association
- Verein der Motorradfreunde — motorcycle club
- SPD-Ortsverein — Social Democratic Party of Germany local chapter

Found in the municipality are a sporting ground and a shooting range.

== Economy and infrastructure ==
=== Economic structure ===
An important economic institution for Rehweiler in days of yore was the mill. In 1585, it was given over into Erbbestand (a uniquely German landhold arrangement in which ownership rights and usage rights were separated; this is forbidden by law in modern Germany), during the Thirty Years' War it was destroyed and in 1675 it was repaired. According to the Sundahl’sches Mühlenprotokoll, this mill had two waterwheels that drove two grist runs with cage gear, and a husking run. A so-called Pletschmühle (one with an overshot waterwheel that could only run when the water flow was strong enough) also stood for a time, on a channel that tapped into one of the Glan's tributaries, which was used only as an overflow mill, and was bound to the main mill. Soon after the Second World War, the mill in Rehweiler was shut down for good. The economic mainstay was agriculture, though the village had the customary craftsmen and innkeepers, and alongside them beginning in the mid 19th century also Musikanten (travelling musicians; see Musikanten and Otto Schwarz in the Hinzweiler article for more about them) and miners. These occupations earned ever more importance on into the 1920s. Today, the village itself offers very few opportunities for a livelihood, and the old craft businesses have long since disappeared. There are an agricultural dealership, a roofing company, an auto body speciality shop and a building services company. Tourism may become more important as time goes by.

=== Education ===
The first rudiments of schooling in Rehweiler in the 17th century could not be brought to fruition because of the ravages of the Thirty Years' War, and only in the course of the 18th century was their any advancement towards the goal of setting up a school system in the village. In the beginning, some children voluntarily attended lessons in Quirnbach. The municipality thus put forth a proposal to establish a school in the village itself at its own expense, since it was all too burdensome, sending the children, some of whom were sickly or not well clothed, to school in Quirnbach in wicked wintertime weather. The chief consistorial councillor and school inspector Euler from Pfeffelbach agreed to send a schoolteacher to Rehweiler, but nonetheless, taxes for the school and bell office would, as before, have to be transferred to Quirnbach. Just when schooling began in Rehweiler is unknown, but in 1730, Johannes Gensinger from Hesse was sent to Rehweiler, right after his examination. Gensinger taught in the village until 1734, when he was called to Bosenbach. Gensinger's successor was Franz Philipp Collini, who taught from Saint Martin's Day to Easter – in other words, only in winter – 30 to 34 schoolchildren in three classes, the whole day but for a one-hour lunch break. Collini received from secular taxes six Rhenish guilders and two Malter of corn (wheat or rye), from the municipality three Malter of corn, and further, each child paid him 15 Kreuzer in school fees. In 1754, the municipality was relieved of its duty to deliver “school wood” (for heating) to Quirnbach. Collini's successor was Johann Jacob Theiß, who according to an official report kept the school in a good state. In 1764, 23 boys and 18 girls were being taught. In 1766, Johann Jacob Müller was the schoolteacher in Rehweiler, 28 years old, father of two children. The dwelling made available to him was merely a parlour. The living arrangements were, not surprisingly, described by the Oberamt officials as “bad”. In 1775, a teachers’ college student Johann Christian Theyss from Rehweiler was named, and in 1783 a schoolteacher Jakob Strauß, whose father Abraham Strauß was the reeve in Rehweiler. In 1790, the teacher Johann Nickel Schmidt was teaching in Rehweiler, a job that he kept through French Revolutionary and Napoleonic times. In the Kingdom of Bavaria (where Rehweiler found itself after the Congress of Vienna), the government undertook from the beginning to bring to life a new school structure. It is known that before 1836 in Rehweiler, a man named Jacob Horstmann led the school. Horstmann was then transferred to Erpolzheim and followed in Rehweiler by Jacob Philipp Schwarm, who for seven years had taught in Haschbach am Remigiusberg. About 1870, Rehweiler parents were no longer satisfied with Schwarm, who after teaching for 35 years showed obvious signs of bodily and mental weakness. With a yearly salary of 200 guilders, he was pensioned off, and after interviewing several applicants, municipal council chose Ludwig Neumüller as his successor. Already towards the end of the century, Neumüller was suffering from a severe eye malady. After several lengthy leaves of absence, he was pensioned off at the age of 64 in 1904. He was succeeded by several supply teachers, first among them Friedrich Hebel senior. When he became seriously ill at the age of 46, his son, Friedrich Hebel junior, then 21 years old, took over. In 1907, a new schoolhouse was built right near the Glan bridge in the Baroque Revival style. The local school had to be closed in the course of scholastic restructuring in 1970. The schoolhouse was remodelled into a house. Primary school pupils and Hauptschule students are now taught in Glan-Münchweiler. Nearby Gymnasien are to be found in Kusel and Landstuhl. The nearest university towns in the broader area are Kaiserslautern (Kaiserslautern University of Technology), Saarbrücken (Saarland University), Trier (University of Trier) and Mainz (University of Mainz).

=== Transport ===
Running through the village is Bundesstraße 423 on the Glan's right bank and parallel thereto, which leads from Altenglan by way of Glan-Münchweiler and Homburg to the French border. Branching from it is Landesstraße 359, which links Rehweiler with the neighbouring village of Quirnbach. All neighbouring villages (Quirnbach, Glan-Münchweiler, Matzenbach) lie only a few kilometres away. To the south lies the Autobahn A 62 (Kaiserslautern–Trier), whose Glan-Münchweiler interchange lies roughly 3 km away. Rehweiler has a railway station on the Landstuhl–Kusel railway, served by hourly Regionalbahn 67 (Glantalbahn, Kusel–Landstuhl–Kaiserslautern) services.

== Famous people ==
=== Sons and daughters of the town ===
- Johann Wilhelm Baumer (1719–1788), physicist, medic and mineralogist (German Wikipedia article)
