= Steinbach am Glan =

- Municipality
- Coat of arms

- Location of Steinbach am Glan within Kusel district
- Interactive map of Steinbach am Glan
- Location within Germany Location within Rhineland-Palatinate
- Coordinates: 49°27′10.48″N 7°23′6″E
- Country: Germany
- State: Rhineland-Palatinate
- District: Kusel
- Municipal assoc.: Oberes Glantal

Government
  - Mayor (2019–24): Jörg Fehrentz (SPD)

Area
  - Total: 6.86 km^{2} (2.65 sq mi)
- Elevation: 301 m (988 ft)

Population (2025-12-31)
  - Total: 843
  - Density: 123/km^{2} (318/sq mi)
- Time zone: UTC+01:00 (CET)
  - Summer (DST): UTC+02:00 (CEST)
- Postal codes: 66909
- Dialling codes: 06383
- Vehicle registration: KUS
- Website: Steinbach am Glan

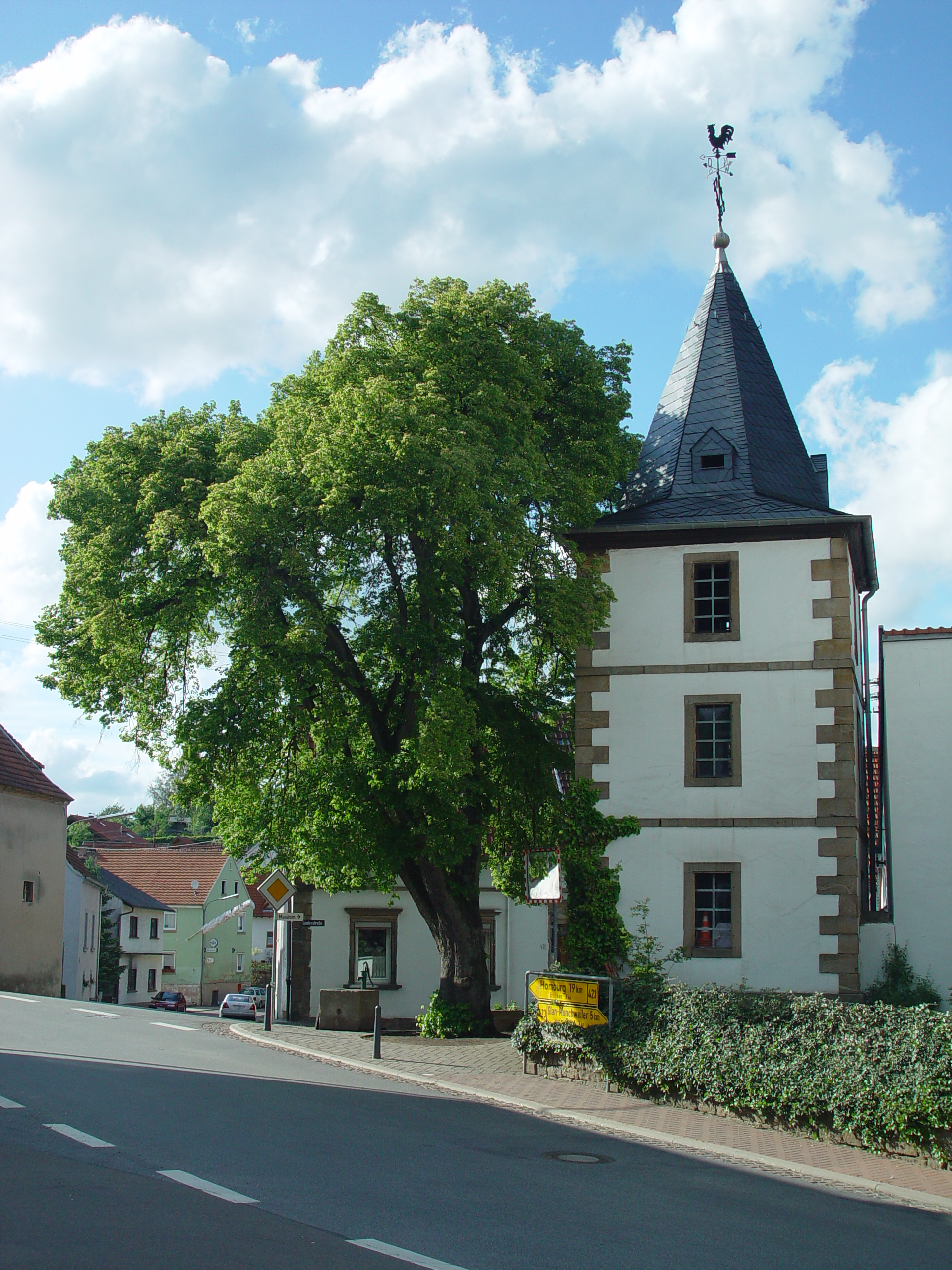
Historic belltower with the “Freedom Tree”

Steinbach am Glan (Palatine German: Schdääbach) is an Ortsgemeinde–a municipality belonging to a Verbandsgemeinde, a kind of collective municipality – in the Kusel district in Rhineland-Palatinate, Germany. It belongs to the Verbandsgemeinde Oberes Glantal.

== Geography ==
=== Location ===
The municipality lies about 35 km west of Kaiserslautern on both sides of the Steinbach, which rises in the village's western end and then flows about one kilometre down to the Hodenbach, where the two streams together become the Henschbach. The constituent community of Steinbach lies on the brook's right bank, and the constituent community of Frutzweiler on the left. Steinbach therefore does not lie directly on the Glan, which makes its name suffix “am Glan”, a bit misleading. It actually lies some 7 km upstream from where the local river empties into the Glan. The name suffix simply serves to distinguish Steinbach am Glan from other places named Steinbach. From the bottom of the dale at roughly 260 m above sea level, the land rises steeply on the right bank up to the Schnepfenrech (417 m) and the Steinberg (406 m), while on the left side, an elevation of 367 m above sea level is reached. Other peaks are the Marbacher Berg, with its sporting ground (353 m), and the Neumühler Berg (343 m). Once lying within municipal limits were two coal pits, Steinbach and Maria. Much of the Hodenbachtal (Hodenbach Valley), laid out as a recreational area, lies within Steinbach's municipal limits. The municipal area measures 686 ha, of which 123 ha is wooded.

=== Neighbouring municipalities ===
Steinbach am Glan borders to the north on the municipality of Wahnwegen, to the northeast on the municipality of Henschtal, to the southeast on the municipality of Börsborn, to the south on the municipality of Brücken, to the west on the municipality of Ohmbach and to the northwest on the municipality of Herschweiler-Pettersheim.

=== Constituent communities ===
Steinbach am Glan's Ortsteile are Steinbach and Frutzweiler. Also belonging to Steinbach am Glan is the outlying homestead of Naturfreundehaus, actually the “Friends of Nature” House.

=== Municipality’s layout ===
The centre now known as Steinbach am Glan was originally made up of two linear villages (by some definitions, “thorpes”), one on each side of the brook, that eventually met and grew together. The way the built-up area is laid out and the way the houses are built, much of it from the 19th century, still reflect this original configuration to some extent, along Bundesstraße 423 in Steinbach's case, and along the old village street (Dorfstraße) in Frutzweiler's. As Steinbach began spreading out to the south towards Börsborn as far back as the early 19th century, the two villages now have the outward appearance of one great clump village, and everywhere side-streets have been springing up down to the present day. Where the two villages have run up against each other, especially on the Steinbach side, a village centre of sorts has arisen. This is where the old belltower stands, built in 1788 and endowed by the then rulers, the Counts of Leyen, represented in this case by Countess Marianne von der Leyen. Also, standing here is the old schoolhouse from 1825, which today houses a kindergarten and the municipal centre. The great limetree standing before the belltower was planted in 1849 as a “Freedom Tree” in the wake of the Revolutions of 1848. Steinbach once had a synagogue from 1725 that stood in this village centre. In 2000, the municipality built the Jewish Museum in this area. The Jewish graveyard from 1825 lies outside the village on the mountain slope towards Henschtal. The general building pattern in the village is characterized by farmhouses, mostly for small holdings. In the village's west lies the closed Frutzweiler graveyard. The older Steinbach graveyard with its warriors’ memorial lies on Bundesstraße 423. A new graveyard west of the village at the Jungenwald (forest) was opened in 1970 for both villages. At the way out of the village to the south going towards Börsborn is the Catholic church, which was converted in 1936 from what had been a mine hoist house.

== History ==
While the two former municipalities may have had many commonalities, their territorial histories on the other hand went two quite different ways. Both centres can look back on a more than 650-year-long history. Indeed, the first documentary mention came in 1355. The village's foremost landmark is the belltower mentioned above.

=== Antiquity ===
As far back as prehistoric times there were people in the area that is now Steinbach am Glan, as clearly witnessed by archaeological finds made within municipal limits. As early as the 19th century, stone axes were being found, which have now all gone missing. Also dating from the Stone Age is a barrow in what was once Frutzweiler's municipal area. A row of six untouched barrows from the late Hallstatt culture stretches along the ridge of the Steinberg as far as the municipal limit with Henschtal. Three further barrows stand on the Schnepfenrech in the south of the municipal area, of which one lies within Börsborn's limits. It is unknown to what epoch these barrows belong. The area was also inhabited in Gallo-Roman times. In 1904, a grave within Steinbach's limits was opened, bringing to light grave goods such as four clay vessels containing ashes, four rings and two needles. These finds might have been from Gallo-Roman times. A stone lion found within Steinbach's limits is now kept at the Historisches Museum der Pfalz (Historic Museum of the Palatinate) in Speyer. From the Altenwald (forest) once led a Roman road over to somewhere near Wahnwegen; it supposedly had a breadth of six metres.

=== Middle Ages ===
Because the Steinbach and the Henschbach formed the border between the Remigiusland and the Hornbach Monastery's holdings in the Münchweiler valley, Steinbach's and Frutzweiler's paths through history were utterly unalike. From the Imperial Domain (Reichsland) around Castle Lautern, kings split certain parcels off to donate them to various ecclesiastical and secular lordships. Great parts passed into Salian hands. Count Werner I of this dynasty endowed the Hornbach Monastery in 737, whose first abbot was Saint Pirmin. The Count bestowed a great many estates and landholds upon the monastery, including the Münchweiler valley, where Steinbach lay. As a fief from the Hornbach Monastery with its centre at Glan-Münchweiler, all this area's villages passed first in 1323 to the Raugraves in the Nahegau, and thereafter, in 1344, to the Archbishop of Trier and the Breidenborns in 1388. In connection with the Münchweiler valley, the village of Steinbach and the now vanished village of Frensweiler were both mentioned repeatedly, although the latter was mentioned earlier. A man named Conradus de Vrodenswilre was mentioned as far back as 1313 in the family Mauchenheim's cartulary, while a village named Frinßwiller was named in 1419 in the family Breidenborn's cartulary. In the Weistum from 1456, a one Clais von Frynswillr crops up as a witness, and in a further 1461 Weistum from Glan-Münchweiler, someone who is likely the same man crops up again as Claz von Frinßwiller (a Weistum – cognate with English wisdom – was a legal pronouncement issued by men learned in law in the Middle Ages and early modern times). The Lords of Frenzweiler may have been considered lower nobility in their own time. In 1355, Steinbach had its first documentary mention in a border description of the Remigiusland; it was mentioned again in the 1419 document mentioned above, and then again in a 1541 Weistum (also a border description). The modern spelling was used, although much of the text used spellings that would now be considered archaic; the spelling used for Frensweiler, on the other hand, was Frntzweiler. Through Georg I von der Leyen's marriage to Eva von Mauchenheim in 1456, the House of Leyen came into possession of the Bliesgau and also, by hereditary accession in 1486, of a share in the Blieskastel castle. At the same time, Abbot Ulrich of the Hornbach Monastery granted Jörge von der Leyen, a Burgmann of Castle Lautern, the Münchweiler valley. The Lords of Leyen had their roots in the lower Moselle area, and by the High Middle Ages, they already resided at their castle near Gondorf on the Moselle. They were mostly in the service of the Archbishop of Trier, and Johann von der Leyen-Saffig was even chosen to fill that office in 1556. Alongside the Leyens, their kin, the Mauchenheims took turns being enfeoffed with parts of the monastery's holdings in the Münchweiler valley, but as of 1533, only the Barons – later Counts – of Leyen were fiefholders there. While Steinbach and Frensweiler eventually lay within the landholds granted the Leyens by the monastery, Frutzweiler lay in the Remigiusland, which was held by the Abbey of Saint-Remi in Reims, and which was also given in 1112 to the Counts of Veldenz as a Vogtei. This put the village in the County of Veldenz. Frutzweiler coincidentally had its first documentary mention in the same 1355 border description as Steinbach (see above), and was mentioned again in a 1387 document from the Counts of Sponheim. A man named Baldewin von Frutzweiler stood in the late 15th century as the Burgmann at Lichtenberg Castle. According to a 1391 document, Count Friedrich III of Veldenz enfeoffed this Baldewin with a rental income of 8 pounds in Lichtenberg currency. In 1397, Baldewin still appeared among the Burgmannen at Lichtenberg Castle. In 1402, Count Friedrich confirmed for him that this rental income could be bequeathed to his offspring. Baldewin had two sons, who were likewise mentioned in documents in the years still to come. One was named Tilman and the other Baldwin after his father. Tilman, too, was in the castle's service as a Junker. In 1414, he confirmed that he was entitled to the same rental income of eight Gulden as his now late father. The younger Baldwin, Tilman's brother, now appeared in the record under the name Baldewin von Zweibrücken. He, too, lived as a Junker at Lichtenberg Castle, and according to a 1441 document, received a rental income of 8 pounds in Heller. This younger Baldewin was married to Jutta von Wadenau, whom he granted his Lichtenberg Castle fief in 1441, a deed confirmed by Count Friedrich III. In 1444, the County of Veldenz met its end when Count Friedrich III of Veldenz died without a male heir. His daughter Anna wed King Ruprecht's son Count Palatine Stephan. By uniting his own Palatine holdings with the now otherwise heirless County of Veldenz – his wife had inherited the county, but not her father's title – and by redeeming the hitherto pledged County of Zweibrücken, Stephan founded a new County Palatine, as whose comital residence he chose the town of Zweibrücken: the County Palatine – later Duchy – of Palatinate-Zweibrücken. From 1444 on, Frutzweiler thus lay in this state.

=== Modern times ===
Until the French Revolution, the local lordly relations did not change very much. Steinbach lay in the Leyens’ Münchweiler valley while Trahweiler lay in the Duchy of Palatinate-Zweibrücken. As a matter of principle, there were good ties between Zweibrücken and the Counts of Leyen. According to a church Visitation protocol, there were 48 people living in Frutzweiler in 1609: 10 men, 11 women, 26 children and one manservant. Frutzweiler then already belonged to the parish of Quirnbach. Corresponding figures for Steinbach from that time are unavailable. Both villages were heavily stricken by the events of the Thirty Years' War and the Plague. Only a few survived the war. Repopulation followed. A few years after the Thirty Years' War, the Leyens began to expand their holdings to the rivers Blies, Saar and Glan. The villages of the Münchweiler valley within this widely scattered landhold were grouped together as an Unteramt of the whole lordship. Only in 1773 did the comital couple of Franz Karl von der Leyen and Marianne née Dalberg move the residence from Koblenz to Blieskastel. After Count Franz Karl's death in 1775, his wife Marianne assumed the regency for their young son Philipp. When Blieskastel was occupied by French Revolutionary troops, the Countess managed to flee and, with some support, get herself first to Koblenz and later to Frankfurt. Under Napoleon’s rule, the Leyens were allowed to have their personal holdings back. Both villages, Steinbach and Frutzweiler, at the time of French rule after 1801 belonged to the Department of Sarre, whose capital was at Trier. Steinbach belonged to the Canton of Waldmohr, the Arrondissement of Saarbrücken and the Mairie (“Mayoralty”) of Glan-Münchweiler, while Frutzweiler belonged to the Canton of Kusel, the Arrondissement of Birkenfeld and the Mairie of Quirnbach.

==== Recent times ====
In 1814, the French were driven out from the Rhine's left bank. After a transitional period, the Bavarian Rheinkreis – an exclave of the Kingdom of Bavaria – was founded in 1816. This was later called the Rheinpfalz (“Rhenish Palatinate”). The administrative entities that had come into being during French Revolutionary and later Napoleonic times had to be reorganized. While Frutzweiler remained in the Bürgermeisterei (“Mayoralty”) of Quirnbach and in the Landkommissariat of Kusel, Steinbach now belonged to the Bürgermeisterei of Glan-Münchweiler in the Canton of Waldmohr in the Landkommissariat of Homburg. The homestead of Neumühle in Steinbach's west, originally part of the municipality, was merged with Brücken. A Steinbach inhabitant, Isidor Triefus, brought the craft of diamond cutting to the Western Palatinate in 1888, thereby laying the groundwork for the region's economic upswing in the earlier half of the 20th century. When Homburg was grouped into the autonomous Saar area after the First World War, the Canton of Waldmohr remained with the newly formed Free State of Bavaria – the Kaiser had been overthrown and so had the Bavarian king – and thereby with Weimar Germany. The canton belonged to the Bezirksamt of Kusel with an administrative branch of its own, which it retained until 1940, whereafter the Canton of Waldmohr was administered directly from Kusel. Thus, Steinbach belonged to the Kusel district, but remained part of the Bürgermeisterei of Glan-Münchweiler. On 31 July 1934, the last horse-drawn postal coach in the Palatinate made its last trip, between Glan-Münchweiler and Steinbach. In the late 1920s and early 1930s, the Nazi Party (NSDAP) became quite popular in Steinbach am Glan. In the 1928 Reichstag elections, 1.3% of the local votes went to Adolf Hitler’s party, but by the 1930 Reichstag elections, this had grown to 4.2%. By the time of the 1933 Reichstag elections, after Hitler had already seized power, local support for the Nazis had swollen to 44.3%. Hitler's success in these elections paved the way for his Enabling Act of 1933 (Ermächtigungsgesetz), thus starting the Third Reich in earnest. The last colliery in Rhineland-Palatinate was in Steinbach am Glan; it was closed in 1959. In the course of administrative restructuring in Rhineland-Palatinate, Glan-Münchweiler became the seat of a Verbandsgemeinde in 1972 into which both the municipality's current centres were grouped. Steinbach am Glan had already been newly formed on 7 June 1969 from the municipal areas of Frutzweiler and Steinbach as part of this administrative restructuring. In 2005, a new building area was opened.

==== Jewish history ====
An almost 300-year-old Jewish history permeates the municipality. As early as 1725, the first synagogue in a country municipality was built here. Steinbach was the hub of Jewish life in the south of what is now the Kusel district; in 1848, out of 217 inhabitants in the village, more than one third were Jewish. There is now a small Jewish Museum in Steinbach.

=== Population development ===
As can still be recognized today in the construction technique of the older parts of both Steinbach am Glan's centres, a great number of the villagers in the 19th century made their living from agriculture. There were also, however, many who worked the coal pits in Steinbach and other mines farther afield. In the earlier half of the 20th century, many diamond cutters lived in both villages. Considerable, too, was the Jewish share of the population, many of whom were in trade and crafts, including the diamond cutting. The number of Jewish families shrank in the latter half of the 19th century as many Jews emigrated to the United States. By 1933, only 35 Jews lived in the village, and under the pressure of Adolf Hitler’s Nazi régime, emigration accelerated. Four Jewish residents who had remained were deported to the Gurs internment camp in the south of France in 1940, whence they were later transported to Auschwitz; they did not survive the Holocaust. A sharp rise in the population figures can be noted between 1800 and the middle of the 19th century, with the population doubling. At the turn of the 20th century, there was a drop in population as people emigrated or moved on. The figures, though, began to rise again, even before the First World War, and further rises can be noted down to the present day. Frutzweiler, too, saw particularly strong population growth in the early 19th century. About 1835, the population peaked, only to fall off steadily for many years afterward, rising again only after the Second World War. The Jewish share of the population was not as high in Frutzweiler as it was in Steinbach. Nowadays, no Jews live in either centre anymore. In the course of the 20th century, ever fewer villagers earned their livelihood at agriculture, until now, this endeavour plays only a very minor role in the municipality’s economy. Today’s municipality of Steinbach am Glan is mainly a residential community for commuters.

The following tables show population development over the centuries for Steinbach am Glan, with some population counts giving a breakdown by religious affiliation. Steinbach and Frutzweiler are treated separately here up to 1971, whereafter the Steinbach table shows the figures for the now amalgamated municipality:

==== Steinbach ====
Year	1825	1837	1840	1871	1905	1939	1961	1971	2003
Total	505	624	724	688	525	672	814	1023	1084
Catholic	124	159					238
Evangelical	236	281					576
Jewish	45	184					–

==== Frutzweiler ====
Year	1825	1835	1871	1905	1939	1961
Total	162	258	250	214	143	198
Catholic	64					50
Evangelical	88					148
Jewish	10					–

More than 120 United States citizens live in Steinbach am Glan.

=== Municipality’s names ===
The placename ending —bach groups Steinbach into the series of names of countless other places with the same ending that arose on brooks – Bach still means “brook” in German – in the course of the Frankish taking of the land. The other part of the name, Stein—, meaning “stone”, is a reference to stone or pebbles, perhaps those found on the brook bed. The name's pronunciation, going by its appearance in documents, has not changed since 1355. The placename ending —weiler bears witness to Frutzweiler's beginnings as a very small settlement (Weiler is the word for “hamlet” in modern-day German, although it originally meant “homestead”), and the other part of the name, Frutz—, likely means that it was founded by a man named Fruodi. Other forms of the name that have appeared in writing over the ages are: Frutzwilr (1378 and 1391), Frutßwilr (1397), Fritzwilre (1401), Frutschwilr (1402) and Frudeßwilre (1411).

=== Vanished villages ===
A village named Frensweiler (also known in the local speech as Fröschweiler), sometimes confused with Frutzweiler, lay within Steinbach am Glan's limits near the forks of the Hodenbach and Steinbach. It had its first documentary mention in 1313 as Vrodenswilre, later being named in further documents: Flinßwilr (1419), Frinswiller (1461) and Frentzwiler (1477). The last example cropped up in Lichtenberg Castle's revenue register, thus bearing witness to the village's still being inhabited at that time. The same was not so by 1541. A Grenzscheidweistum (a Weistum that describes a border's alignment) explicitly describes the village as a Wüstung, the German word for “abandoned village”. Hence, it is clear that the village was forsaken by its villagers sometime between 1477 and 1541. Frenzweiler had the same —weiler ending as Frutzweiler, and the other part of the name, Frenz—, derives from the Frankish personal name Frudin. Frenzweiler was thus originally “Frudin’s hamlet”. According to local lore, there were once two other villages in the west of the municipal area, named Steinbrück and Schnepfental. These two names, however, do not show up in any old documents, although there is still a rural cadastral name, Schnepfenrech.

== Religion ==
Steinbach belonged from the Early Middle Ages to the Glan-Münchweiler church, which was consecrated by Saint Pirmin and ministered to all churches in the Münchweiler valley. In the time of the Reformation, Steinbach, along with all the dwellers of the Münchweiler valley, had to adopt on the lord's orders Lutheran beliefs, leaning as the Leyens did mainly towards Palatinate-Zweibrücken's views when it came to religion, at least at first. In 1588, though, when Palatinate-Zweibrücken, then headed by Duke Johannes I, commanded all its subjects to convert to Calvinism, the Counts of Leyen resisted this order within their lordly domain. The valley's Christians kept their Lutheran faith, but were subject to an ecclesiastical administration that was directed from Zweibrücken. After the Thirty Years' War, the law conferred religious freedom, and indeed, among the newcomers to Steinbach, particularly at the time of King Louis XIV's War of the Reunions, were a great many Catholics. At the turn of the 19th century, one third of the Christian population was Catholic, a share that is still similar today. Today's Protestant villagers belong to the Quirnbach church within the Evangelical deaconry of Kusel, while the Catholics belong to the Glan-Münchweiler church within the Catholic deaconry of Kusel. The same is true for Frutzweiler.

As a village within the Remigiusland, Frutzweiler belonged from the Early Middle Ages to the Kusel church, but later to the Quirnbach church. In the time of the Reformation, people here had to convert to Lutheranism as well, but unlike people in Steinbach, they obeyed the order from Duke Johannes to convert to Calvinism. Only after the Thirty Years' War did the Duchy of Palatinate-Zweibrücken have to tolerate other faiths. The Swedish kings promoted Lutheranism while the French tried to restore Catholicism to the land. By the turn of the 19th century, almost half Frutzweiler's population was Catholic. By the 20th century, the figures had once again swung the Protestants’ way, and they are to this day about two thirds of the population.

After Count Casper von der Leyen allowed Jakob Levi, a Jew, to settle in Steinbach in 1728, a considerable Jewish community grew bit by bit in the village, which laid out its own graveyard and built a synagogue, not only for themselves but for worshippers from the surrounding area, too. It is not known in exactly what year the synagogue was built, but the Jewish Museum's information says that it was 1725. In 1825, Jews made up 29% of Steinbach's population; in Frutzweiler it was 6%. Before 1933, there were no tensions between Jews and Christians, but then came Adolf Hitler and the Nazis. On Kristallnacht (9–10 November 1938), SA thugs came to the village, destroyed the synagogue in Steinbach, ravaged several Jewish houses and devastated the Jewish graveyard.

== Politics ==
=== Municipal council ===
The council is made up of 12 council members, who were elected by majority vote at the municipal election held on 7 June 2009, and the honorary mayor as chairman.

=== Mayor ===
Steinbach am Glan's mayor is Jörg Fehrentz (SPD).

=== Coat of arms ===
The municipality's arms might be described thus: Per pale argent on ground a limetree, both vert, and azure a belltower gules with pedestal, roof and quoins Or, on a chief party per pale azure a diamond proper and Or a hammer and pick per saltire sable.

The four charges in the arms refer to the municipality's particularities. The diamond on the dexter (armsbearer's right, viewer's left) side of the chief stands for the history of diamond processing in the municipality while the hammer and pick on the sinister (armsbearer's left, viewer's right) side of the chief refer to Steinbach am Glan's history as a coalmining centre. The other two charges below these are municipal landmarks, the great limetree and the belltower before which it stands, endowed by Countess Marianne von der Leyen in 1788. The tower is held to be Steinbach am Glan's foremost landmark. At the time when the two villages were separate, Frutzweiler bore no arms. The arms have been borne since 1986 when they were approved by the now defunct Rheinhessen-Pfalz Regierungsbezirk administration in Neustadt an der Weinstraße.

== Culture and sightseeing ==
=== Buildings ===
The following are listed buildings or sites in Rhineland-Palatinate’s Directory of Cultural Monuments:

- Börsborner Straße 1 – Quereinhaus (a combination residential and commercial house divided for these two purposes down the middle, perpendicularly to the street), 1856; characterizes village’s appearance
- Lindenstraße 75 – belltower; three-floor plastered building on stone-block pedestal, eight-sided spire, 1788; bell, about 1400, ascribed to Otto von Speyer (see picture at head of article)
- Jewish graveyard (monumental zone) – 1824-1938; area ringed by quarrystone wall with 232 gravestones

=== Natural monuments ===
A historic lime tree, planted in 1849 as a "Freedom Tree" following the Revolutions of 1848, stands in front of the 1788 belltower.

=== Sport and leisure ===
The Friends of Nature house Am Haselrech on the heights between Steinbach and Börsborn is a popular hiking destination. Beginning there are three Nordic walking trails of various difficulty levels belonging to the Haselrech Nature Fitness Park, which was laid out by the Kusel district in 2006. There is a farm lane leading to the Hodenbachtal local recreation and leisure area. On the way out of the village going towards Börsborn is a hydrotherapeutic wading basin based on Father Sebastian Kneipp’s model.

=== Regular events ===
Steinbach am Glan holds the following yearly events:

- Kirchweih – kermis (church consecration festival), celebrated by both centres on the last weekend in July
- Dorffest – village festival (every second year)
- Weihnachtsmarkt – Christmas Market

=== Clubs ===
The following clubs are active in Steinbach am Glan:

- E. L. C. (Eisenbahn-Landschaft-Club) – model railways
- Feuerwehrverein – fire brigade association
- Gymnastikverein – gymnastics
- Landfrauenverein – Countrywomen’s Club
- Motorrad Club MC – Motorsport Club
- Naturfreunde – Nature Club
- Obst- und Gartenbauverein – fruitgrowing and gardening
- Pensionärsverein – Pensioners’ Club
- Sportverein TUS – Sport club
- Verein evangelischer Frauen – Association of Evangelical Women
- Verein katholischer Frauen – Association of Catholic Women
- Volkschor Steinbach-Frutzweiler (founded in 1867 as Männerchor Steinbach-Frutzweiler, a men's singing club) – “People’s Choir”, and municipality's oldest club

=== Museums ===
Steinbach am Glan houses a museum devoted to the former Jewish presence in the municipality.

== Economy and infrastructure ==
=== Economic structure ===
Even in an economic sense, Steinbach forms together with Frutzweiler a unit today. Already by the 18th century, agriculture could no longer claim to be the only, nor even the most important, income earner in the municipality, for it was then that in Steinbach, as in so many nearby places, too, that exploitation of the underlying coal seams began. These are part of the Breitenbacher Flöz (Flöz means “seam” or “lode”). Several collieries sprang up in the municipal area. Perhaps the best known was the Maria pit in the east. During the time of French rule after 1800, Theobald Roth ran the Steinbach pits. He paid a fee of 54.89 francs on the collieries’ yield each year. In the course of the 19th century, coalmining in Steinbach was eventually shut down, for it could not compete with the more productive pits in the nearby Saar. Steinbach collieries, however, did undergo a revival in Weimar times because the Saar had been politically and economically separated from Germany by the Treaty of Versailles. This revival, though, ended with the onset of the Second World War. In the late 19th century, diamond processing (cutting and polishing) grew into a particularly important branch of industry, which can be traced back mainly to a Steinbach native, Isidor Trifuß. This industry rooted itself not only in Steinbach, but also in several neighbouring villages as well. After Trifuß had founded a diamond-cutting workshop at the Neumühle (“New Mill”) between Brücken and Ohmbach in 1888, by and by competing businesses sprang up in Brücken itself, and in neighbouring villages. The first in Steinbach opened in 1912. Later the village had 12 diamond-cutting workshops with roughly 80 employees. Just after the Second World War, there were even as many as 100 employees in this field. Beginning about 1960, though, the industry found itself on a downswing due to, more than anything else, competition from countries with lower wages, but also to some extent to the international diamond trade's requirements. In 1960, there were still seven diamond-cutting businesses in Steinbach, but by 1970, only four. Since then, all have closed. The groundwork for tourism has been laid and will be expanded in the future. Steinbach today is otherwise above all a residential centre for families whose breadwinners must commute elsewhere.

=== Education ===
It is certain that in the time before the French Revolution, there was hardly any commonality in schooling between the then two separate villages of Steinbach and Frutzweiler. Quite likely, neither village had its own schoolhouse, and classes were taught at private houses, with the school in Frutzweiler being a Catholic one also attended by children from villages that lay rather far away. In the Kingdom of Bavaria, the authorities strove from the beginning to bring unity to schooling for both villages, even though the two schools stood in two different Landkommissariate (districts). In 1825, a schoolhouse with two classrooms was opened for the Christian schoolchildren. In 1838, the Jewish schoolhouse opened, even if it was a bit cramped. In 1842, the Jewish school was moved to a new building in which a mikveh had been built. In 1857, a Catholic schoolhouse was built. The Jewish school was dissolved during the First World War. In 1928, both villages decided to build a common schoolhouse, although at first Frutzweiler village councillors refused to pay the share that was demanded of them. A new school came into being in 1932 in Steinbach for both the Christian denominations and for the Jews. The municipality sold the old schoolhouses off in 1938.

=== Transport ===
Running through Steinbach is Bundesstraße 423, leading to Altenglan, Glan-Münchweiler, Homburg and the French border. A Landesstraße branches off and leads to neighbouring Börsborn. To the northeast lies the Autobahn A 62 (Kaiserslautern–Trier). The nearest interchange is at Glan-Münchweiler, some 7 km away. Serving Glan-Münchweiler, some 6 km away, is Glan-Münchweiler station on the Landstuhl–Kusel railway. There are hourly trains at this station throughout the day, namely Regionalbahn service RB 67 between Kaiserslautern and Kusel, named Glantalbahn after a former railway line that shared a stretch of its tracks with the Landstuhl–Kusel railway, including the former junction at Glan-Münchweiler.

== Famous people ==
=== Sons and daughters of the town ===
- Isidor Trifuß (b. 1840 in Steinbach; d. 1919 in Kaiserslautern)

Trifuß opened a diamond-cutting shop at the Neumühle (“New Mill”) near Brücken in 1888, thus founding the West Palatine tradition of diamond cutting.
