= Henschtal =

- Municipality
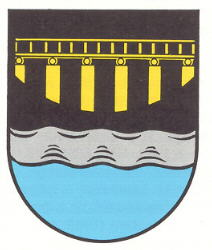
- Coat of arms

- Location of Henschtal within Kusel district
- Interactive map of Henschtal
- Location within Germany Location within Rhineland-Palatinate
- Coordinates: 49°27′59″N 7°24′36″E
- Country: Germany
- State: Rhineland-Palatinate
- District: Kusel
- Municipal assoc.: Oberes Glantal

Government
  - Mayor (2019–24): Roger Decklar

Area
  - Total: 3.46 km^{2} (1.34 sq mi)
- Elevation: 240 m (790 ft)

Population (2025-12-31)
  - Total: 317
  - Density: 91.6/km^{2} (237/sq mi)
- Time zone: UTC+01:00 (CET)
  - Summer (DST): UTC+02:00 (CEST)
- Postal codes: 66909
- Dialling codes: 06383
- Vehicle registration: KUS
- Website: henschtal.de

Henschtal is an Ortsgemeinde – a municipality belonging to a Verbandsgemeinde, a kind of collective municipality – in the Kusel district in Rhineland-Palatinate, Germany. It belongs to the Verbandsgemeinde of Oberes Glantal.

== Geography ==
=== Location ===
Henschtal lies on both sides of its namesake brook, the Henschbach, formed by two smaller streams called the Steinbach and the Hodenbach, which flows right through Henschtal and thence down to the Glan, meeting it upstream from Rehweiler. The Ortsteil of Haschbach lies on the right bank, while the Ortsteil of Trahweiler, whose centre is roughly 500 m upstream, lies on the left bank. The municipal area measures 345 ha, of which 61 ha is wooded.

==== Haschbach am Glan ====
Haschbach lies on the Henschbach's right bank, somewhat downstream from Trahweiler and on the other side. The elevation at the bottom of the valley is roughly 240 m above sea level. Towards the south, the slope of the Klopfberg climbs steeply to 380 m above sea level. Some of the land on the slope is wooded. Haschbach does not lie right on the Glan. The tag “am Glan” merely serves to distinguish the Henschtal Ortsteil from the self-administering Ortsgemeinde of Haschbach am Remigiusberg, which lies in the same district.

==== Trahweiler ====
Trahweiler stretches along a road running parallel to the Henschbach and along a side valley of the Henschbach. The valley floor here lies at an elevation of slightly more than 240 m above sea level, and some of the houses on higher ground stand at about 250 m above sea level. Towards the north, the land climbs steeply, reaching an elevation of 478 m above sea level. The land towards the municipal limit with Wahnwegen is wooded. West of Trahweiler, into Steinbach am Glan’s municipal area, the Hodenbach empties into the Hengsbach. The Hodenbach valley, which along the brook’s northern reaches touches Trahweiler’s (former) municipal area, is held to be a popular recreational area.

=== Neighbouring municipalities ===
Henschtal borders in the north on the municipality of Quirnbach, in the east on the municipality of Glan-Münchweiler, in the southeast on the municipality of Börsborn, in the southwest on the municipality of Steinbach am Glan and in the west on the municipality of Wahnwegen.

=== Constituent communities ===
Henschtal’s Ortsteile are Trahweiler, Haschbach am Glan and the hamlet of Sangerhof. For the purposes of this article, Trahweiler and Haschbach am Glan will be discussed separately under most headings, while the Sangerhof outlying centre will be grouped with Trahweiler.

=== Municipality’s layout ===
==== Haschbach am Glan ====
Haschbach was originally a linear village (by some definitions, a “thorpe”). The built-up area mostly runs along Bundesstraße 423, locally known as Hauptstraße (“Main Street”). Today, other streets branch off Hauptstraße towards the south, into a side valley of the Henschbach. The shapes that the houses take make it quite clear that the village was once mostly characterized by agriculture. The former schoolhouse stands not far from the bridge linking the Ortsteil of Haschbach with the Ortsteil of Trahweiler. West of the village lies the graveyard.

==== Trahweiler ====
Trahweiler was originally settled along the valley road, which can still be made out today in the simple farmhouses that were built mostly in the 19th century to the general design that characterizes such houses in the Westrich, an historic region that encompasses areas in both Germany and France. Newer building can be found along this road's extensions and on two sidestreets that branch off towards the north. The graveyard lies west of the village.

== History ==
=== Antiquity ===
==== Haschbach am Glan ====
Even as far back as prehistoric times, the broader area around the village was settled by man, bearing witness to which are archaeological finds. A row of barrows runs from within Steinbach am Glan's limits into Haschbach. It is unknown, though, from what time these date. The area was also settled in Gallo-Roman times, although there have been no finds to confirm this.

==== Trahweiler ====
The area around Trahweiler was settled in both prehistoric times and Roman times, bearing witness to which are many barrows in the municipal areas of neighbouring villages and Gallo-Roman finds in the area.

=== Middle Ages ===
==== Haschbach am Glan ====
From the contiguous Free Imperial Domain (Freies Reichsland) around Castle Lautern (Kaiserslautern), kings split certain areas off to give as donations to both ecclesiastical and secular lordships. Great parts of it came into the Salian dynasty’s ownership. Count Werner I from the Salian noble family endowed Hornbach Abbey in 737, whose first abbot was Saint Pirmin. Werner furnished this monastery richly with estates and lands, among which was the Münchweiler Tal (dale), which itself included the Henschbach valley, to which Haschbach belonged. As a fief from Hornbach Abbey with Glan-Münchweiler as its hub, all villages in this valley first passed to the Raugraves in the Nahegau, and thereafter to the Archbishop of Trier in 1344 and to the Breidenborns in 1338. In connection with the Münchweiler Tal, both the now vanished village of Frensweiler and also Haschbach are named repeatedly in documents. Thus it says in the Weistum of Glan-Münchweiler (a Weistum – cognate with English wisdom – was a legal pronouncement issued by men learned in law in the Middle Ages and early modern times), which was handed down about 1330 and written in both Latin and Middle High German, that the Raugraves’ representative (a bailiff or a beadle) was entitled to, among other things, a piece of land in Hagenspach. In Latin, the text reads: "habet idem pedellus in Haschbach in inferiore mansu dimidietatem ex parte dominorum quidquid cedit." The Middle High German text reads: "Item hat auch derselbig büttel von der herren zu Hagenspach im underen mansu den halben theil, was da felt." Then, in the 1456 Glan-Münchweiler Weistum, it says: "Da soll ein apt zu Hornbach von sant Pirmans wegen denselben budel den zehenden zu Haspach zuschen den zwein grunden geben und zustellen nach wisung des orteils." Also appearing in this Weistum as a witness is someone named “Clais von Frynswillr”, who is also named in another Glan-Münchweiler Weistum from 1461 as “Claz von Frinßwiller”. Whoever he was, he was apparently from Frenzweiler, as indicated by his name, a village that has long since vanished, but which likely lay within what are now Henschtal's limits. Furthermore, a man named Konrad von Vrodenswilre – another reference to the same village – had appeared in 1313 in the Mauchenheim cartulary. It is likely that the Lords of Frenzweiler were distinguished members of the lower nobility. With Georg I's marriage to Eva von Mauchenheim in 1456, the House of Leyen came into ownership of the Bliesgau, and by inheritance in 1486 that family also came to own a share in the castle at Blieskastel. At the same time, Abbot Ulrich of Hornbach Abbey granted Jörge von der Leyen, a Burgmann from Castle Lautern, the Münchweiler Tal. The Lords of Leyen had their roots in the lower Moselle area and kept their seat as early as the High Middle Ages at their castle near Gondorf on the Moselle. They stood mostly in the service of the Archbishops of Trier, and indeed in 1556, Johann von der Leyen-Saffig was chosen to be the Archbishop of Trier. Besides the House of Leyen, until 1533, the Leyens’ kin, the Mauchenheims were also enfeoffed in turn with parts of the Abbey's holdings in the Münchweiler Tal.

==== Trahweiler ====
Trahweiler might have arisen in the 12th century, but an earlier founding cannot be ruled out. It is certain that the village lay within the so-called Remigiusland, which defined its later history. The oldest document that had been preserved from the Middle Ages, from 1446, was lost to the ravages of war. Another document from 1458, a book of accounts of payments by subjects owed the lords, says that Trahweiler was liable to the Remigiusberg Monastery in such matters, and listed the payments in money and in kind owed by not only Tragewillr but also Quirnbach and Frutzweiler. Trahweiler was included in the founding of the County of Veldenz under Count Gerlach I in 1112. In 1444, Frederick III, Count of Veldenz, the last from the Hohengeroldseck family to rule the county, died without a male heir; the county passed to his son-in-law Stephen, Count Palatine of Simmern-Zweibrücken, widower of Frederick's daughter, Anna of Veldenz. Stephen, combining his lands, created the new County Palatine of Zweibrücken, which in the fullness of time came to be known as the Duchy of Palatinate-Zweibrücken.

Even before Trahweiler's first documentary mention, the now vanished village of Frensweiler was being mentioned in documents. The documentary mentions of Conrad von Vrodenswilre and Clais von Frynswilr, both named after the former village, are discussed above.

=== Modern times ===
==== Haschbach am Glan ====
Until the French Revolution, the lordly structure did not change again. Like all villages in the area, Haschbach, too, was stricken with the hardships and horrors of the Thirty Years' War and the Plague. By the 1648 end of that war, only a few people survived in the area. Newcomers settled, though, as in the neighbouring village of Trahweiler, there may have been no more than five families living in Haschbach, even into the 18th century. A few years after the Thirty Years' War, the Family von der Leyen began to expand their holdings on the rivers Blies, Saar and Glan. The villages of the Münchweiler Tal within these scattered holdings were gathered together administratively into an Unteramt of the lordship as a whole. Only in 1773 did the comital couple Franz Karl von der Leyen and Marianne, née Dalberg, move the comital residence from Koblenz to Blieskastel. After Count Franz Karl's death in 1775, his beloved, and now widowed, wife Marianne took on the regency for their underage son, Philip Francis, Prince of Leyen.

==== Trahweiler ====
Wolfgang, Count Palatine of Zweibrücken introduced the Reformation according to Martin Luther into his county in 1537, and in 1588, John I, Count Palatine of Zweibrücken forced his subjects to convert to the Reformed faith according to John Calvin (Calvinism). In 1609, according to the ecclesiastical visitation protocol of Baumholder, 50 persons in 10 families lived in Trahweiler. During the 17th century, the Thirty Years' War and French King Louis XIV's wars of conquest claimed many victims, and for a time, the village was almost empty of people. Newcomers raised the population figures back up, and beginning in the 18th century, there were once more people migrating out of the village.

==== Recent times ====
===== Haschbach am Glan =====
Countess Marianne von der Leyen managed to flee during the occupation of Blieskastel by French Revolutionary troops, escaping with subjects’ help first to Koblenz and then later to Frankfurt. Under Emperor Napoleon’s rule, the Family von der Leyen were allowed to have their personal holdings back. Haschbach belonged during the time of French rule to the Department of Sarre, the Mairie (“Mayoralty”) of Quirnbach, the Canton of Kusel and the Arrondissement of Birkenfeld. Thus, the village belonged for the first time to the same administrative unit as the neighbouring village of Trahbach. In 1814, the French were driven out, and after a transitional period, the Baierischer Rheinkreis (Bavarian Rhine District) was founded, which was later called the Rheinpfalz (Rhenish Palatinate). By any name, though, it was the territory on the Rhine that the Congress of Vienna awarded to the Kingdom of Bavaria. The union of Haschbach and Trahweiler that had arisen in French times was once again put asunder. While Trahweiler remained in the Bürgermeisterei (“Mayoralty”) of Quirnbach and in the Landkommissariat (District) of Kusel, Haschbach now belonged to the Bürgermeisterei of Glan-Münchweiler in the Canton of Waldmohr and the Landkommissariat of Homburg. When Homburg was assigned to the autonomous Saar after the First World War, the Canton of Waldmohr remained with Bavaria (albeit the Free State of Bavaria and not the Kingdom, for the last king had abdicated along with the Kaiser) and was grouped into the Bezirksamt (District) of Kusel. In the process, Waldmohr got an outlying branch of the administration for the places that had been newly grouped into the Bezirksamt; it lasted until 1940. Haschbach thereby belonged permanently to the Kusel district, and still to the Bürgermeisterei of Glan-Münchweiler. In the course of administrative restructuring in Rhineland-Palatinate in 1968, Glan-Münchweiler became the seat of a Verbandsgemeinde, to which the villages of Haschbach and Trahweiler both belonged. These two villages were united in 1970 into the Ortsgemeinde of Henschtal. Since 1972, it has belonged to the Verbandsgemeinde of Glan-Münchweiler.

===== Trahweiler =====
When the German lands on the Rhine’s left bank temporarily belonged to France, Trahweiler belonged to the Mairie (“Mayoralty”) of Quirnbach, the Canton of Kusel, the Arrondissement of Birkenfeld and the Department of Sarre, whose seat was at Trier. In the Bavarian time that followed Napoleon's defeat, beginning in 1817, the village belonged to the Bürgermeisterei of Quirnbach in the Canton of Kusel, with Kusel also being the Landkommissariat seat. In the early 1930s, the Nazi Party (NSDAP) was quite popular in Trahweiler. In the 1933 Reichstag elections, 51.3% of the local votes went to Adolf Hitler’s party. Hitler’s success in these elections paved the way for his Enabling Act of 1933 (Ermächtigungsgesetz), thus starting the Third Reich in earnest.

===== Henschtal =====
The current municipality came into being on 7 June 1969 with the merger of the municipalities of Haschbach am Glan and Trahweiler. It was named after the Henschbach, the brook that flows through the middle of the municipality (the —tal ending is German for “dale” or “valley”, while the —bach ending means “brook”). This marked the boundary between the two former municipalities, Haschbach and Trahweiler, that now form Henschtal.

=== Population development ===
==== Haschbach am Glan ====
As can still be seen today in the building style of the village's houses, the greater part of the population in the 19th century earned their living at agriculture. This changed in the 20th century as ever more farmers sought work outside the village, either working the land as a secondary occupation or giving farming up altogether. Thus, agriculture today plays a subordinate role, and the village is first and foremost a residential community for people in the most varied of occupations.

The following table shows population development over the centuries for Haschbach am Glan, with some figures broken down by religious denomination:

Year	1825	1835	1871	1905	1939	1961
Total	137	150	158	153	185	199
Catholic	15					13
Evangelical	116					183
Jewish	6					–

==== Trahweiler ====
The following table shows population development over the centuries for Trahweiler, with some figures broken down by religious denomination:

Year	1609	1825	1835	1871	1905	1939	1961
Total	50	164	220	174	182	232	263
Catholic	–	26					22
Evangelical	50	138					240

=== Municipality’s names ===
==== Haschbach am Glan ====
Haschbach is among the many villages with names ending in —bach (“brook”) that arose at streams at the time when the Franks were taking over the land. The derivation of the name Haschbach is otherwise uncertain. The first syllable, Hasch—, or, to use its older form, Has—, according to placename researchers Ernst Christmann and Kaufmann, refers to the hare (in German, Hase; or in Proto-Germanic, Haso). Researchers Dolch and Greule concur, but do not rule out that the syllable might refer to Hasa, a name for a body of water. Over the ages, Haschbach has borne the following names: Haschbach (1330), Haspach (1456 and 1460), Haßbach (1587), Aschbach (1797) and Hasbach (1824). According to a village chronicle, the name was written Haspach in 1589 and Aspach in 1712, even though other places spelt their names —bach, with a B.

==== Trahweiler ====
The village's name, Trahweiler, has the common German placename ending —weiler, which as a standalone word means “hamlet” (originally “homestead”), to which is prefixed a syllable that goes back to a man's name, either “Trago” or “Drago”. According to this derivation, Trahweiler arose from “Trago’s (or Drago’s) Homestead”. The name first appeared in documents still preserved today in the form Tragewylre in 1446. Over the ages, Trahweiler has borne the following names, among others: Tragewillr (1458 and 1460), Trawiler (1480) and Trahweiler, (1824).

==== Henschtal ====
The modern name for the merged municipality was coined in 1969. The name is drawn from the one borne by the brook that flows through the municipality, the Henschbach. The ending —bach (“brook”) was simply dropped and replaced with —tal (“dale” or “valley”). The first syllable, Hensch—, derives from the German Hengst (“stallion”; compare the development of the English word henchman), and indeed for a while, the brook was called the Hengstbach. Henschtal, therefore, is, according to its name, the place in the valley of the Hengstbach/Henschbach.

=== Vanished villages ===
A village named Frenzweiler lay outside the Remigiusland in the Münchweiler Tal, possibly within Haschbach's former limits (before the amalgamation), but then again, perhaps within Steinbach am Glan’s limits. In 1313, this village had its first documentary mention as Vrodenswilre and was later also named in other documents: Flinßwilr (1419), Frinswiller (1461), Frentzwiler (1477). The last named mention was a register of the incoming accounts of Schloss Lichtenberg, in which Frenzweiler’s name appears. Hence, the village was still populated at that time. This, however, was not so by 1541. In the 1541 Kuseler Grenzscheidweistum (a Weistum describing boundaries), the reader notes “At the inflow of the Hodenbach … lies in House of Leyen lands the ghost village of Freisweiler, from which the Scheideflössgen (border stream) took the name Freisweiler Flössgen”. Hence, the village must have been forsaken sometime between 1477 and 1541. Along with the ending —weiler (see Trahweiler above), the name Frenzweiler has a prefix that refers to a Frankish personal name, Fruodin or Frudin. Frensweiler was therefore originally “Fruodin’s Homestead”.

== Religion ==
=== Haschbach am Glan ===
Haschbach belonged from the Early Middle Ages to the Glan-Münchweiler church, which was consecrated by Saint Pirmin and ministered to all churches in the Münchweiler valley. As early as 1537, Wolfgang, Count Palatine of Zweibrücken adopted the Reformation and all his subjects (including Haschbach and the dwellers of the Münchweiler valley), had to adopt Lutheran beliefs. In 1588, when John I, Count Palatine of Zweibrücken, commanded all his subjects to convert to Calvinism, the Counts of Leyen resisted this order within their lordly domain. The valley's Christians kept their Lutheran faith, but were subject to an ecclesiastical administration that was directed from Zweibrücken. After the 1648 conclusion of the Thirty Years' War, the law conferred religious freedom, and indeed, among the newcomers to Haschbach were a few Catholics. In the 19th century, a few inhabitants of the Jewish faith were noted in the village. On the whole, though, the population even today remains overwhelmingly Evangelical. Christians of both denominations attend church in Glan-Münchweiler.

== Politics ==
=== Municipal council ===
The council is made up of 8 council members, who were elected by majority vote at the municipal election held on 7 June 2009, and the honorary mayor as chairman.

=== Mayor ===
Henschtal's mayor is Roger Decklar.

=== Coat of arms ===
The municipality's arms might in English heraldic language be described thus: A fess wavy abased argent between sable a roadbridge with a railing and six piers couped in fess embowed reversed Or, and azure.

The arms for the newly amalgamated municipality were created in 1970. The tinctures azure and argent (blue and silver) are a reference to Haschbach's former allegiance to the House of Leyen, and the wavy fess is also a reference to the brook that runs through the municipality, the Henschbach. The tinctures sable and Or (black and gold) are a reference to the Duchy of Palatinate-Zweibrücken. The charge above the wavy fess is the big Autobahn bridge that crosses the Henschbach valley between Quirnbach and Henschtal. The arms go back to a design by Willi Nierhaus, and have been borne since 1972 when they were approved by the now defunct Rheinhessen-Pfalz Regierungsbezirk administration in Neustadt an der Weinstraße.

== Culture and sightseeing ==
=== Buildings ===
The following are listed buildings or sites in Rhineland-Palatinate’s Directory of Cultural Monuments:

==== Haschbach am Glan ====
- Hauptstraße 26 – former school; sandstone-framed plastered building and barn, 1876, architect Johann Schmeisser, Kusel
- Hauptstraße 27 – one-floor Quereinhaus (a combination residential and commercial house divided for these two purposes down the middle, perpendicularly to the street), 1855/1856

==== Trahweiler ====
- Sangerhof 4 – sandstone-framed Quereinhaus, 1876

=== Regular events ===
Both Ortsteile together hold their kermis (church consecration festival) on the second weekend in October. It was done in this way even before the amalgamation. On 1 May, the Maypole is decorated. Henschtal is among those places that still observe the peculiar Western Palatine custom known as the Pfingstquack, observed at Whitsun (Pfingsten in German); the —quack part of the custom’s name refers to a rhyme that the children recite as they go door to door begging for money with their gorse-decked wagon. The rhyme generally begins with the line “Quack, Quack, Quack”.

=== Clubs ===
The following clubs are active in Henschtal:

- Feuerwehrförderverein — fire brigade promotional association
- Gesangverein — singing club
- Imkerverein — beekeepers’ club
- Jugendfeuerwehr — youth fire brigade
- Landfrauenverein — countrywomen’s club
- Motorsportverein — motorsport club
- Pensionärsverein — pensioners’ club
- Schützenverein — shooting club
- Seniorenverein — seniors’ club
- SPD-Ortsverein — Social Democratic Party of Germany local chapter
- Spielmannszug — marching band
- VdK-Ortsverein — local chapter of an advocacy group representing people with handicaps, the elderly, veterans, etc.

== Economy and infrastructure ==
=== Economic structure ===
==== Haschbach am Glan ====
Even in an economic sense, Haschbach and Trahweiler today form a unit. As early as the beginning of the 20th century, ever more workers were having to seek livelihoods outside the village. Projections for tourism are expected to expand in the future. Haschbach is otherwise, first and foremost, a residential community.

=== Trahweiler ===
Besides farmers, craftsmen lived in the village, and beginning in the early 20th century, also miners, factory workers, company employees and officials. Fields of endeavour outside agriculture kept on earning greater importance. Today, the village itself offers little in the way of earning opportunities. Even business life in the two formerly separate villages is now unified. It is hoped that opportunities in tourism can be broadened in the coming years.

=== Education ===
==== Haschbach am Glan ====
About schooling in the Münchweiler Tal at the time of the Counts of Leyen hardly anything is known. What is certain is that at that time, there was no collaboration in education with the neighbouring village of Trahweiler. Only after the cession to the Kingdom of Bavaria after the Congress of Vienna did the government put forth efforts, right from the beginning, to build a school for both the villages on each side of the Henschbach. In 1822, the district government in Speyer wrote: “Even though the two places are separated by the brook, in two Landkommissariate and two cantons, this hinders the common school cooperative in no way, and Trahweiler gets the same advantage from the separation from Quirnbach as Haschbach does from the separation from Münchweiler.” The inhabitants of Trahweiler did not share this opinion, because they had already paid in advance to have a school built in Quirnbach, and moreover, they refused to join a school cooperative. The upshot was that Haschbach ended up building its own schoolhouse in 1828 in the village itself. When the government in Speyer nonetheless tried to force the formation of such a body in 1829, Trahweiler once more raised an objection, saying that it wished to build its own schoolhouse. Once again, the government would not allow it and wrote: “The municipality of Trahweiler is much too small to build its own schoolhouse and remunerate its own schoolteacher.” The Landkommissariat of Kusel took the same view and in 1832 announced: “The municipality of Trahweiler has at last stepped back from its intention to build its own schoolhouse.” Although a school cooperative was now established, there were once more differences of opinion, this time about who would pay how much in fees for the school. Haschbach council wanted to use the general taxation as a basis for the calculations, whereas Trahweiler council thought it would be fairer to use the number of schoolchildren from each village as the basis (see the table under Trahweiler, below). Haschbach's 1828 schoolhouse soon could not meet the village's demands, and so both municipalities built a new schoolhouse in 1874 with a teacher's dwelling downstairs and a classroom upstairs. The cost of this new school was 20,336 marks and 92 pfennigs, of which Trahweiler bore 12,140 marks and 30 pfennigs and Haschbach 8,196 marks and 62 pfennigs. By 1939, the one classroom was no longer enough to serve the two villages’ needs, and the teacher's dwelling was converted into another classroom. The local school had to be closed in the course of school restructuring in 1970. Since then, primary school pupils and Hauptschule students have been attending school in Glan-Münchweiler. The nearest Gymnasien are in Kusel and Landstuhl. University towns in the greater region are Kaiserslautern, Saarbrücken, Trier and Mainz.

=== Trahweiler ===
Preparations to build a school in the early 17th century could not be brought to fruition mainly because of the frightful events of the Thirty Years' War, and newer records about schooling in Trahweiler only show up in historical records from the 18th century (the Thirty Years' War ended in 1648). These records say that at that time, many children did not go to school because they were expected to work in the fields. Obviously there was no school in the village itself, and those that did go to school went to Quirnbach. In Bavarian times, beginning in 1816, the Royal Government called for the establishment of a common school for Trahweiler and Haschbach. The Haschbach am Glan section above deals with the disagreements arising from this. Haschbach council tried to accommodate its neighbouring village by offering to let it pay only a third of the cost even though it had a greater population, and the fee for each schoolchild would only be one guilder each year, whereas the school in Quirnbach, where Trahweiler's schoolchildren had been attending classes, demanded 32 Batzen – almost two guilders – each year. In 1828, a schoolhouse was built across the brook in Haschbach, but owing to the ongoing failure to come to an agreement with its neighbouring village over cost sharing, and to the failure to establish a school cooperative, Trahweiler's schoolchildren were not afforded the opportunity to attend school just across the brook, and still had to go to school in Quirnbach. As outlined in the above section, an initiative that would have seen Trahweiler build its own school fell through. Then there was the argument over who should pay more or less towards a common school. Trahweiler held that payment should be based on the number of schoolchildren attending school from each village. Often, though, numbers were roughly equal:

Year	1845	1846	1847	1848	1849	1850	1851	1852	1853	1854
Trahweiler	44	44	46	43	38	37	32	32	31	33
Haschbach	40	38	39	36	36	37	33	32	28	27

From the time that the new, common school for both villages was built in 1874, Trahweiler's school history is the same as Haschbach am Glan's.

=== Transport ===
Running through the municipality is Bundesstraße 423, which runs through the Ortsteil of Haschbach parallel to the Henschbach on its right bank, leading from Altenglan by way of Glan-Münchweiler and Homburg and onwards to the French border. A Kreisstraße links Haschbach by way of Trahweiler and the Sangerhof with Wahnwegen. To the northeast lies an interchange on the Autobahn A 62 (Kaiserslautern–Trier), some 5 km away near Glan-Münchweiler. The nearest station is Glan-Münchweiler station, some 3 km away, which is on the Landstuhl–Kusel railway and is served hourly by Regionalbahn service RB 67 between Kaiserslautern and Kusel, called the Glantalbahn (the name of which refers to the Glan Valley Railway, which shared some of the route of the Landstuhl–Kusel line, including the former junction at Glan-Münchweiler). Trains serve the station hourly throughout the day.
