= Brücken, Kusel =

Brücken
- Municipality
- Coat of arms

- Location of Brücken within Kusel district
- Interactive map of Brücken
- Location within Germany Location within Rhineland-Palatinate
- Coordinates: 49°25′55″N 7°21′36″E
- Country: Germany
- State: Rhineland-Palatinate
- District: Kusel
- Municipal assoc.: Oberes Glantal

Government
  - Mayor (2025–29): Christof Dahl

Area
  - Total: 8.12 km^{2} (3.14 sq mi)
- Elevation: 247 m (810 ft)

Population (2025-12-31)
  - Total: 2,058
  - Density: 253/km^{2} (656/sq mi)
- Time zone: UTC+01:00 (CET)
  - Summer (DST): UTC+02:00 (CEST)
- Postal codes: 66904
- Dialling codes: 06386
- Vehicle registration: KUS
- Website: www.bruecken.de

Brücken (Pfalz) (German pronunciation: [ˈbʁʏkn̩]) is an Ortsgemeinde – a municipality belonging to a Verbandsgemeinde, a kind of collective municipality – in the Kusel district in Rhineland-Palatinate, Germany. It belongs to the Verbandsgemeinde of Oberes Glantal, whose seat is in Schönenberg-Kübelberg.

== Geography ==
=== Location ===
The municipality lies in the Ohmbach valley in the Western Palatinate. Near the village, the Ohmbach turns from its southerly direction of flow to a more southeasterly one where the valley floor also broadens out. Here it has an elevation of some 240 m above sea level, whereas the higher residential areas reach almost 300 m above sea level. The higher elevations within municipal limits, meanwhile, reach heights of some 380 m in the northeast and 320 m in the southeast. Also flowing through the municipal area in the southeast, near the small homestead of Paulengrund is the Kohlbach. The Neumühle, originally a gristmill and from the late 19th century until after the Second World War a diamond-cutting workshop, stands in the village's north in the Ohmbach valley, and the homestead of Fuchsgrund lies on the valley floor to the southeast. Wooded land stretches eastwards and northwards from the village, and is also found in the southwest. The galleries of former coalmines lie in the village's northeast on the Dammfeld and the Buchwiese (rural cadastral names), at the Schenkelberg (mountain) and in the Schleckenborn. The municipal area measures 811 ha, of which 166 ha is wooded.

=== Neighbouring municipalities ===
Brücken borders in the north on the municipality of Steinbach am Glan, in the northeast on the municipality of Börsborn, in the east on the municipality of Gries, in the south on the municipality of Schönenberg-Kübelberg, in the west on the municipality of Dittweiler and in the northwest on the municipality of Ohmbach.

=== Constituent communities ===
Also belonging to Brücken are the outlying homesteads of Paulengrund, Neumühle and Fuchsgrund.

=== Municipality’s layout ===
The village stretches out along the bend in the Ohmbach on relatively even ground on the valley floor, and in the outskirts on roads that climb outwards in a star-shaped pattern. The main street is one of these, running from the upper Ohmbach valley through the middle of the village and then in a broad bow to the south going towards Schönenberg-Kübelberg. On this main street ("Hauptstraße") stands the schoolhouse, as does the Diamond-Cutting Museum (Diamantenschleifermuseum). In the northwest on the mountainside stands Saint Lawrence's Catholic Parish Church. Nearby lies the graveyard. The Evangelical parish church built in 1953 stands in the northeast on Straße Zum Krämel (a road). Old farmhouses of the type Quereinhaus type (a combination residential and commercial house divided for these two purposes down the middle, perpendicularly to the street) are still to be found in the village core. The outer residential areas are otherwise characterized by houses, mostly newer single-family dwellings. A major sport field has been laid out in the Karstwald (forest) southeast of the village on the road going towards Schönenberg.

== History ==
=== Antiquity ===
As early as prehistoric times, the area around the village was inhabited by mankind, bearing witness to which are various finds from both Brücken itself and almost every neighbouring municipality. In the woods east of Brücken, at least according to a listing in the documents at the Office for Prehistory and Protohistory (Amt für Vor- und Frühgeschichte) in Speyer, is a prehistoric barrow with a diameter of some nine metres and a height of 70 cm. Nevertheless, there is no longer any sign of it on the ground. Much clearer are traces left by the Romans. In 1928, while ploughing over the heights near the Paulengrund in the field named "Auf der Burg", a farmer discovered some wall remnants of a Gallo-Roman villa rustica. This was temporarily unearthed so that it could be surveyed. According to statements made by earlier inhabitants, it is likely that in the early 20th century a vault with urns was unearthed. Later attempts at digging, though, yielded no such result. According to information from writer Tilemann Stella, in his time (17th century), A Roman stone, found within Brücken's limits, was known, showing on one side the goddess Minerva and on the other side the god Vulcan. Also, reports from the 19th century mention that a coin was found within Brücken's limits, but this has since been lost.

=== Middle Ages ===
The village of Brücken belonged from the time of its founding to the free Imperial Domain (Reichsland) around the town and castle of Kaiserslautern and the Amt and court district of Kübelberg in this domain. This Amt of Kübelberg, beginning in 1312, was taken over in succession by a whole series of secular lordships as an Imperial pledged holding, passing first to the Counts of Sponheim and in 1375 to Electoral Palatinate, and then in 1378 back to Sponheim, only to pass once again to Electoral Palatinate in 1437. Sometime before 1333 – the exact date is unknown – Brücken had its first documentary mention in a Weistum (cognate with English wisdom, this was a legal pronouncement issued by men learned in law in the Middle Ages and early modern times) from Glan-Münchweiler in which the boundaries of the landhold held by the Hornbach Monastery in the Münchweiler Tal (dale) were outlined, in both German and Latin. According to this description, the boundary came from a now vanished village called Wanrneshoben, ran round the Steinberg to Bartenvogt (a ford near Waldmohr) "…und darnach durch die mitten zwischen bruckhen bis gehn Brenheim" ("…and thereafter through the middle between Brücken and up until Brenheim"). The corresponding Latin text reads "…et tunc per medium inter Brugel et usque Berinheim". Brenheim (Berinheim, Breitenheim) is a former village, but in connection with this matter, nothing is clear. Writer Dieter Zenglein is of the opinion that the naming of Bruckhen and Brugel (another name used for the place in the Weistum) is likely to have nothing to do with the village of Brücken, but rather with named rural areas (common in Germany even now). It may be that Brücken was named in even older documents in connection with the Hornbach Monastery. Nevertheless, it is quite unclear whether Brücken in the Ohmbach valley is meant. A 1372 document says that Johann von Wilenstein pledged taxes owed him and his holdings "in the estate at Brücken in Obenbach parishes" to his brother-in-law Frank von Wendelsheim. It is, however, certain that this refers to Brücken in the Oster valley. Otherwise, the village’s history is the same as that experienced by the whole Amt of Kübelberg. In the Late Middle Ages, the first of a series of Huberbücher (literally "books of farmers who work a whole Hube, a land area roughly equivalent to the English oxgang) was published by the Knights of Mauchenheim, who as vassals of the Counts Palatine of Zweibrücken and Electoral Palatinate were enfeoffed with holdings in the Amt of Kübelberg.

=== Modern times ===
Further lists of Huber appeared in the 16th century, as did holding directories from the Wörschweiler Monastery. A comprehensive description by Electoral Palatinate Master Forester Vellmann comes from 1600. There was no great change in the arrangement of rulers in Early Modern Times. The Plague and the Thirty Years' War brought the village horror and death. "When in the autumn of 1635 the Imperial formations withdrew from Lorraine to the Rhine, they received orders to burn the villages on the army road down. Our village, too, was apparently overrun by troops in this year. The inhabitants were displaced, murdered or driven out, unless they had already fled sometime earlier." As if to confirm this, the taxation rolls thereafter showed hardly any entries, and towards the end of this harrowing war, and even for a few years after the Peace of Westphalia (1648), Brücken was a ghost village. It was 1656 before anyone – only two people – ever lived in the village again, and there then followed a sparse repopulation. French King Louis XIV’s wars of conquest, though, led to more hardship, destruction and loss of life. Only after the Treaty of Ryswick (1697) was there any effort aimed at repopulating the village. This was promoted by the Electoral Palatinate lord and brought newcomers from Switzerland, the Tyrol and even France to the region. The population figures rose swiftly in every village in the Amt of Kübelberg, including Brücken. Among these newcomers were also many Catholics, whereas earlier, from the beginning of the Reformation, only the faith according to Martin Luther had been tolerated.

Under the 1779 Treaty of Schwetzingen, Electoral Palatinate traded the court district of Kübelberg, and thereby Brücken, for the villages of Duchroth and Oberhausen and part of the village of Niederkirchen, all formerly belonging to the Duchy of Palatinate-Zweibrücken. Brücken was thereby also transferred from the Electoral Palatinate Oberamt of Kaiserslautern to the Zweibrücken Oberamt of Homburg and to the Schultheißerei of Waldmohr. One year before the exchange, the Electoral Palatinate geographer Goswin Widder described the village of Brücken for his four-volume work Geographische Beschreibung der Kurpfalz ("Geographical Description of Electoral Palatinate"), which only came out in 1788. Because of the territorial swap, Brücken could no longer be listed in the work, though the foreseen text has been preserved in manuscript.

==== Recent times ====
The interlude with Palatinate-Zweibrücken, however, did not last long, for the old feudal states were all swept away in the aftermath of the French Revolution. In 1793, the first French Revolutionary troops showed up in the region, exacting contributions from the populace and plundering the countryside. Brücken was spared none of this. In 1801, France annexed the German lands on the Rhine’s left bank and the oppression that had characterized the early days of French hegemony came to an end, although local young men were still being pressed into the French Army to fight France’s wars. During the short time of French rule, which ended in 1814, Brücken lay in the Mairie ("Mayoralty") of Schönenberg, the Canton of Waldmohr, the Arrondissement of Saarbrücken and the Department of Sarre (Département de la Sarre), whose seat was at Trier. In 1814, the French withdrew from the German lands on the Rhine’s left bank, and Brücken was at first assigned to the district of Ottweiler. After a transitional time – the changes brought about by the Congress of Vienna had not quite taken hold – the Baierischer Rheinkreis ("Bavarian Rhine District") came into being in 1816, later coming to be known as the bayerische Rheinpfalz ("Bavarian Rhenish Palatinate"), an exclave of the Kingdom of Bavaria. Brücken now lay within this new piece of Bavaria, and within the Bürgermeisterei ("Mayoralty") of Schönenberg, to which belonged not only Schönenberg itself, but also the villages of Kübelberg and Schmittweiler, and this Bürgermeisterei further belonged to the canton of Waldmohr in the Landkommissariat (later Bezirksamt and Landkreis or district) of Homburg. After the First World War, the district of Homburg was grouped into the autonomous Saar. The canton of Waldmohr, though, remained with Bavaria – now the Free State of Bavaria now that the last king of Bavaria and the Kaiser had abdicated – and thus with Germany, too. It belonged with a branch location of the administration to the Bezirksamt of Kusel, which remained in existence until 1940. As early as 1895, the citizens of Brücken put forth a proposal to the Kingdom of Bavaria to split the village away from the Mayoralty of Schönenberg and found their own mayoralty, and a year later the appropriate municipal council decision was made. The raising of the village to self-governing municipality came about in 1921. After the Waldmohr branch administration had been dissolved, this mayoralty belonged administratively to the district of Kusel. In the course of administrative restructuring in Rhineland-Palatinate, Brücken became an Ortsgemeinde in the Verbandsgemeinde of Schönenberg-Kübelberg in 1972.

=== Population development ===
In the village chronicle Brücken in der Pfalz (Bauer/Zenglein 1994), the village's population development is comprehensively documented. As early as the Late Middle Ages, there were roughly 100 inhabitants, which at that time already made it a big village. The repopulation after the Thirty Years' War proceeded only in fits and starts, only for the population to be adversely affected once again by more warfare in the 17th century as French King Louis XIV sought conquests in several wars. Only a well directed repopulation effort promoted by the Electors was able to bring about a steady rise in population in the course of the 18th century, and this resulted in a demographic change, not only in the greater numbers, but also in the predominant religious belief, for many Catholics heeded the call for new settlers, especially from French-speaking Europe. Eventually, they tipped the numeric balance in favour of their own denomination, becoming the majority in Brücken. The greater part of the population earned their livelihood at agriculture, and even the various craftsmen, merchants and innkeepers worked the land as a secondary source of income. Only with the opening of the collieries in the latter half of the 18th century did miners settle in the village, eventually building up to ten family heads. In 1753, the population count was once again more than 300, meaning that it had risen tenfold since the beginning of the century. Then, however, there was a definite flattening in the population growth curve. Further growth was indeed forthcoming, but now, there was also emigration. Growth once more began in earnest in the 19th century. Late that same century came another growth spurt with the spread of the diamond-cutting industry, which strengthened the village's economy until the mid 20th century. Neither agriculture nor diamond-cutting are of any particular importance today, and the villagers work at the most varied of occupations; most must commute to work outside the village. Nevertheless, the population has risen to a current total of about 2,600.

The following table shows population development over the centuries for Brücken, with some figures broken down by religious denomination:

Year	1753	1825	1835	1861	1871	1905	1939	1961	2003
Total	323	836	952	960	950	1,279	1,915	2,370	2,604
Catholic		532						638	1,680
Evangelical		252						277	689
Jewish		52						–	–
Other		–						45	235

=== Municipality’s name ===
"Brücken" means "bridges" in modern German. As the municipality's name makes clear, the village arose at a little bridge (Brückchen in German) that crossed the Ohmbach here. The municipality is also known in the local speech as "Brigge". In some of the earliest documentary mentions from 1372 and 1420, the village was called Brucken (without the umlaut). Beginning in the 16th century, however, the spelling Brückhen (1592) or Brücken (1611) became the preferred form. The name first appeared sometime before 1333 in the Glan-Münchweiler Weistum mentioned above under "History/Middle Ages", in which the name appeared in two forms, Brückhen and Brugel. The latter form is to be understood as meaning "little bridge" (it has no modern German form). It is, however, a point of debate as to whether the Brückhen or Brugel in the Weistum actually refers to the village in question. Later documentary mentions render the placename Brucken (1372, 1420, 1438), Bruck (1440, 1564) or Pruck (1570). The name seems to have settled on Brücken by the early 17th century, although the form Ohmbachbrücken has also appeared, to distinguish the village from others with the same name (see Brücken and Brücken). Since 14 January 1954, the municipality's name has officially been "Brücken (Pfalz)". On that day, the Rhineland-Palatinate state government approved the municipality's application to bear the tag "(Pfalz)", which means "(Palatinate)", as part of its name.

== Religion ==
According to Dieter Zenglein's work in the chronicle, Brücken belonged with respect to ecclesiastical organization to the parish of Ohmbach as a branch with a chapel. The parish's main church had been given over as early as 976 to the Disibodenberg Monastery by Archbishop of Mainz Willigis. The Disibodenberg Monastery's holdings in the Oster valley and around Ohmbach were sold in 1256 to Count Gerlach V of Veldenz, who in turn, together with his wife Elisabeth, bequeathed these landholds and rights to the Wörschweiler Monastery in 1257. This monastery was secularized in the time of the Reformation. Even so, after the Reformation's introduction into Brücken, the village still belonged to the Church of Ohmbach, until its parish was dissolved in 1638. The chapel at Brücken might well have been razed during the Thirty Years' War. Since most of the newcomers who settled in Brücken after the war were Catholic, the chapel was reinstated for Catholic worshippers and consecrated to Saint Lawrence in 1724. Thereafter, the Catholic chapel in Brücken was occupied by a chaplain and functioned as a branch church of the Kübelberg mother church for Brücken itself and also the neighbouring villages of Ohmbach, Dittweiler, Altenkirchen and Frohnhofen. Soon afterwards, though, in 1730, this branch split away from the parish church and got its own priest, a process prompted by a number of issues that had put parishioners at loggerheads. In Napoleonic times, ecclesiastical organization was thoroughly overhauled. The Diocese of Worms, which had hitherto been responsible, was dissolved and the Church of Brücken passed to the Diocese of Trier; fifteen years later, after Bavarian rule had begun, it was transferred once again to the Diocese of Speyer. Likewise in the time of French rule, Kübelberg became a parish seat for the whole canton of Waldmohr. Breitenbach, Brücken, Glan-Münchweiler and Höchen were now held to be nothing more than auxiliary parishes within the greater cantonal parish. Since Brücken had a great Catholic community to tend, it was treated once more in Bavarian times as a parish unto itself. In 1838, the new Saint Lawrence's Church (Laurentiuskirche) arose on the spot in the heart of the village where the little mediaeval chapel had since been torn down. After about one hundred years, this church, too, had become too small. By then, Adolf Hitler and the Nazis had come to power and war was looming. This put off the building of the foreseen new church, to be built somewhere in the village's northeast until after the Second World War; it was consecrated in 1955. The old church was torn down. Today, Brücken is an autonomous parish within the Schönenberg-Kübelberg parish group, to which the Catholic Christians in the municipalities of Altenkirchen, Dittweiler, Frohnhofen, Herschweiler-Pettersheim, Krottelbach and Ohmbach also belong.

If the Catholic inhabitants came to predominate after the repopulation efforts after the Thirty Years' War and further immigration in the 18th century, there were nonetheless also Reformed and Lutheran communities in the village. Since the Catholics had the chapel at their disposal, they also had control of the bells, which long lay at the heart of a dispute as to whether they should also be rung for Evangelical burials. The Lutherans were granted approval about 1740 to build their own little church. The Catholics, with their local priest's support, tried to forestall the building of the church, which was nonetheless finished in 1742. The Reformed congregants still attended services in Altenkirchen. After the unification of the two Protestant denominations in the 1818 Palatine Union, the Catholic church, which had since fallen into ruin, became a branch church of Altenkirchen for all the village's Protestants. A proper Evangelical church was, after long delays, was finally built in 1953, near the old chapel.

Besides the Christian denominations, there was, beginning in the late 18th century, also a Jewish community in the village. At first, worship was held at a prayer house with a cantor leading, until 1833, when the congregation, small as it still was, built itself a synagogue. About the middle of the 19th century, the Jewish community numbered some 70 members. Thereafter, the number of Jews in Brücken fell, mostly owing to emigration, leading to the dissolution of the hitherto autonomous community, which now joined the bigger Jewish worship community in neighbouring Steinbach am Glan. Among the members of the Jewish community was Isidor Triefus, the founder of the diamond-cutting industry in the village. As early as 1927, the by now long empty synagogue was auctioned off. By 1933 at the onset of the notoriously antisemitic Third Reich, there were ten Jews still living in the village, most of whom emigrated soon afterwards. Only the family Straaß stayed, whose fate was most unfortunate. In 1940, they were deported by the Nazis to Gurs internment camp in Gurs in the southwest of France, whence they were further transported in 1942 to Auschwitz. Only two family members survived the Holocaust. They were brother and sister, Walter and Mildrut (Mildred) who later emigrated to the United States.

== Politics ==
=== Municipal council ===
The council is made up of 17 council members (16 plus Mayor), who were elected by proportional representation at the municipal election held on 9 June 2024. The election yielded the following composition of the Municipal Council (Ortsgemeinderat):

CDU (9), SPD (3), Free Independent Group (4).

=== Mayor ===
Brücken's mayor is Christof Dahl (CDU), who was elected on 29 June 2025 with 83.3% of the vote. This election became necessary because his predecessor, Johannes Huber (CDU), who had been elected in 2024 as the successor to Pius Klein (CDU), was elected county commissioner of the Kusel district in March 2025 and therefore had to give up the office of local mayor.

=== Coat of arms ===
The municipality's arms might be described thus: Sable issuant from base a bridge arched of two Or masoned of the field, surmounting the middle spandrel a diamond shining proper, upon the bridge a lion passant of the second armed, langued and crowned gules holding in his dexter prang a miner's hammer of the second.

The charge in the upper half of the escutcheon is the Palatine Lion. He holds, raised up in his right forepaw, a golden miner's hammer. The lion is walking along a stone bridge with two arches upon whose middle spandrel is a shining diamond. The bridge itself is a canting charge for the municipality's name, Brücken ("bridge" is Brücke in German). Moreover, the municipality was named for an actual bridge. The Palatine Lion refers to Brücken's 350-year history as a holding of Electoral Palatinate. The tool in the lion's paw symbolizes the village's history as a coalmining centre. The local economic mainstay was for roughly a century diamond cutting, to which the diamond charge alludes.

== Culture and sightseeing ==
=== Buildings ===
The following are listed buildings or sites in Rhineland-Palatinate’s Directory of Cultural Monuments:

- Saint Lawrence's Catholic Parish Church (Pfarrkirche St. Laurentius), Hauptstraße 66B – spacious nave with hipped roof, low aisles, belltower, 1953–1955, architect Wilhelm Schulte II
- Bergstraße 2 – Quereinhaus (a combination residential and commercial house divided for these two purposes down the middle, perpendicularly to the street), upper floor 1841, stable complex from the latter half of the 19th century
- Near Glanstraße 16 – wayside cross; pedestal and cross made of yellow sandstone, Corpus made of cast metal, 19th century
- Glanstraße 24 – Quereinhaus on high basement, 1911; stucco ceilings
- Hauptstraße 26 – former Catholic school; Late Historicist building with hipped roof, gable risalto, 1903, architect Regional Master Builder Löhner, Homburg; characterizes street's appearance

=== Regular events ===
On the second weekend in September, the kermis (church consecration festival, locally known as the Brigger Kerb) is held, on the Sunday after the Nativity of Mary. To this day, this festival with its traditional kermis customs has retained its special meaning in Brücken's village life. Weeks before the kermis, the Straußjugend (the Strauß youth – Strauß is used here in a non-standard meaning; it means a log festooned with colourful streamers here, not a bouquet, not a set of feathers on a helmet, and certainly not an ostrich) gather to set about working on the kermis. Most of the work entails decorating the Strauß – which has only actually been made out of a spruce log since the early 1960s – onto which up to 25,000 paper streamers in thick, long rows are bound. Formerly, the Strauß was a spruce sapling onto whose twigs colourful bands, bows and glossy paper were stuck. After a festive parade, the Strauß is put up at the inn and the kermis is called out, whereafter the Straußpfarrer (Pfarrer means "clergyman") gives his speech. Then, the Strauß is christened with a glass of wine. On the Monday the Strauß is taken away and on the Tuesday the kermis is brought to an end. Traditionally the Brigger Kerb is celebrated for four days, and is today, as ever, a time when former villagers come back to Brücken for a visit.

There is also a rock festival each year, held on a cow stall. "Rock'um Kuhstall"

=== Diamond-Cutting Museum ===
This opened to the public in December 1998. The area of over 150 m^{2} on the ground floor and first floor of the former convent of the Catholic parish of Brücken is home to the permanent exhibition. Besides a complete, fully functional diamond-cutting shop, complete with original workstations from various times and replicas of 35 of the world's biggest and most important diamonds, there is also a media room in which audiovisual documentation is shown. The ground floor of the building next door to the museum has integrated into it a small jewellery shop, "Nina’s Goldschmiede" (Goldschmiede means "goldsmith’s shop").

Onto the existing convent building, a two-floor building has been built. Located on the ground floor here is the museum café "Brillant", while the upper floor houses changing exhibits, which can be linked with the museum's area of specialization, in a large hall. The hall also affords room for cultural events and festive occasions.

Before the museum stands a statue of a diamond cutter by Peter Brauchle, a sculptor from Lustadt.

=== Clubs ===
Brücken has a great many clubs:

- Arbeitergesangverein Eintracht 1925 — workers’ singing club
- Allgemeiner Sportclub Bunker Boys 1976 — sport club
- Automobilclub in ADAC — ADAC car club
- Behindertensportgruppe — disabled sports
- Big Band "Just for Fun"
- Brieftaubenverein Paloma — carrier pigeon club
- Deutsches Rotes Kreuz — German Red Cross
- Freiwillige Feuerwehr — volunteer fire brigade
- Gewerbeverein — chamber of commerce
- Katholische Arbeitnehmerbewegung (KAB) — Catholic Employees’ Movement
- Katholischer Kirchenchor — Catholic church choir
- Kulturverein — cultural club
- Männergesangverein Liederkranz — men's singing club
- Musikverein — music club
- Obst- und Gartenbauverein — fruitgrowing and gardening club
- Ökumenischer Krankenpflegeverein — ecumenical nursing association
- Pfälzerwald-Verein — hiking club
- Reit- und Fahrverein — riding club
- Schachfreunde — chess club
- Sportverein 1920 — sport club
- Turnverein 1964 — gymnastic club
- Unterhaltungsverein — conversation club
- Verein der Hundefreunde — dog lovers’ club
- VdK — advocacy group for the handicapped, elderly, chronically ill, etc.
- Volkstanzkreis — dancing

== Economy and infrastructure ==
=== Economic structure ===
Originally, agricultural operations predominated in Brücken alongside the customary craft businesses, among which were many linen weavers. As of the late 18th century, there was also coalmining within Brücken's municipal limits. In 1775, the Bernhardus colliery was opened. The Josephsgrube, another colliery, followed in 1785. Jewish dealers ran the livestock trade in the greater area. As early as 1372, a mill in Brücken was named, which likely had an end put to it by the Thirty Years' War. A new mill arose in the early 18th century and lasted until 1960; the property is today occupied by a building material dealership. Another mill in the Brücken area was the Paulengrunder Mühle in the Kohlbach valley, which was first mentioned in 1600 and is likely much older. It, too, was destroyed in the Thirty Years' War, but was later built again together with an inn. Only in 1973 did it, too, succumb to the great "mill death". A third mill was the Neumühle ("New Mill") which originally lay within Steinbach's limits, becoming amalgamated with Brücken in 1842. It was run as a gristmill and an oilmill. In 1864, it got a steam engine, making it independent of the water conditions in the Ohmbach. In 1887, it passed into Isidor Triefus's ownership. In 1888, Isidor Triefus founded the first diamond-finishing shop in Brücken, and indeed in the Palatinate, there. London diamond merchants at that time did their own diamond finishing, bringing themselves substantially increased profits. This may well have made Triefus consider opening his own shop. His business laid the groundwork for a whole new industry in the region, and others soon sprang up in nearby villages, with most specializing in the brilliant cut. In January 1907, the firm Daßbach und Geier, founded in 1892 in Hanau, built a branch location in Brücken. It was the first competition that the Triefus diamond-finishing shop had ever had. Some of the diamond finishers were technically gifted and strove to improve the tools used for working diamonds. The Pfälzer Doppen, also called the Amann-Doppen, a kind of dop developed and patented by Philipp Amann in 1928 that is still used today, was best at meeting the demands of the trade and became the standard everywhere. In all the world's countries in which diamonds are cut and polished, machines from the firm Amann are in use. In 1929, Brücken alone had 45 diamond-cutting shops with 375 employees. All together, the Western Palatinate had 108 diamond-cutting shops with 679 employees. In this same year, of course, came the onset of the Great Depression, and along with it came the beginning of the end for the diamond-cutting industry. Brücken was the economic hub of Palatine diamond crafting up until the Second World War. However, the diamond-cutting trade that for so many decades influenced and defined the local people's lives is now all but a relic from bygone days, with the last diamond-cutting shops going out of business in the 1990s. All that is left of the industry now are two diamond cutters who work bort diamonds for industry, and that as a secondary occupation only. In December 1998, the new Diamond-Cutting Museum was dedicated in Brücken. With the diamond-cutting trade's death, Brücken became a residential community for employees in the most varied of occupations, many of whom must seek livelihoods outside the village.

Within the village, however, are no fewer than six inns, a butcher’s shop, building companies and building supply companies and small businesses such as those in the field of electrical and electronic products.

=== Education ===
In the early 17th century, schoolchildren from Brücken at first attended school in Kübelberg, until in 1716 a Catholic schoolhouse was built, followed by an Evangelical one in 1724. A fundamental restructuring of schooling came about in Bavarian times, whereby teachers had to demonstrate their competence through examinations. In 1818, Landcommissar Siebenpfeiffer set forth the proposal to build a great schoolhouse together with teachers’ dwellings for both Christian denominations and for the Jewish community as well. Siebenpfeiffer also later issued orders that it be built, over both Protestants’ and Catholics’ fierce protests. The schoolhouse was built in 1825, but it was not exactly the interdenominational institution that had been envisaged. The schoolchildren were streamed into classes geared to either Protestant or Catholic belief, and in 1836, the Evangelicals were able to obtain a smaller, nearby schoolhouse. Thus, Catholic schoolchildren were taught in two classes and Evangelical schoolchildren were taught in one. Jewish schoolchildren attended the Evangelical school. About 1900, the school, especially the Catholic part, had become overfull. A new schoolhouse with four classes, three of which were for the Catholic school, was dedicated on Hauptstraße in 1904. In 1921, the mayor's office also took up residence in this building. In 1929, the Protestants once again obtained their own schoolhouse on Paulengrunder Straße, allowing the Catholics to institute a fourth class. In 1937, the community school was established, and then dissolved again after the Second World War, only to be established once again in 1969. Once again, the schoolhouses had become too small, and a new one was obtained in 1960 on Wiesenstraße. Further changes were brought by the 1969 school law. The great school centre came into being in Schönenberg-Kübelberg, where all Hauptschule students are now taught. At the Brücken school, primary school pupils from neighbouring villages are now taught. Also, the schoolhouse now houses a branch location of the school for children with learning difficulties in Kusel.

=== Transport ===
Brücken is linked to the national highway system by Bundesstraße 423 (Sarreguemines–Mandelbachtal–Homburg–Altenglan), from which within the village itself Landesstraße 350 to Konken and Bundesstraße 420 branches off. Kreisstraße (District Road) 6 branches off to the Paulengrund (outlying homestead), as does Kreisstraße 7 to the neighbouring village of Börsborn. To the south runs the Autobahn A 6, and to the northeast lies another Autobahn, the A 62 (Kaiserslautern–Trier). Glan-Münchweiler station is on the Landstuhl–Kusel railway and is served by Regionalbahn service RB 67, called the Glantalbahn (the name of which refers to the Glan Valley Railway, which shared some of the route of the Landstuhl–Kusel line, including the former junction at Glan-Münchweiler). Serving Sankt Wendel is a station on the Nahe Valley Railway. Serving Homburg is a station on the Homburg–Neunkirchen railway and the Palatine Ludwig Railway. These stations all lie within 12 km of Brücken.

== Famous people ==
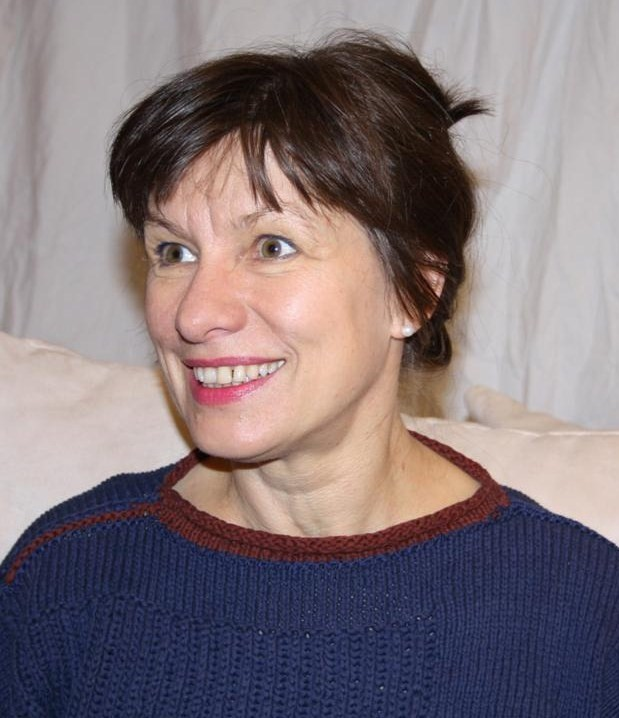
Marcella Berger

=== Sons and daughters of the town ===
- August Spies (1893–1972), politician (CDU)
- Marcella Berger (1954–), author
