= Veldenz lion =

Heraldic emblem

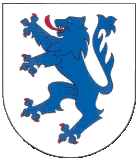
Veldenz Lion

The Veldenz lion is a heraldic emblem. As a charge the heraldic lion in the coat of arms has a stationary appearance. The blazon is "argent, a lion rampant azure, armed and langued gules".

As a representation of the County of Veldenz this lion can be found in many arms in the region. In the Palatinate the Palatine lion dominates.

== History ==
In 1444 the Castle of Veldenz and the surrounding area in the Mittelmosel were granted to the Count of Pfalz-Zweibrücken.

The arms of Niederstaufenbach show the black-and-gold colors of the County of Veldenz and the red lion of Pfalz-Zweibrücken. It is a reference to their former overlords. In the arms of Veldenz next to the blue Veldenz Lion are the Wittelsbach lozenges. The lion was an 1835 emblem of the King of Bavaria. The Veldenz lion is also known as the Bavarian lion ". The lion remained in the coat of arms until the end of the First World War. The arms lapsed with the abdication of King Ludwig III during the November revolution.

== Coats of Arms with the Veldenz lion ==
The Veldenz lion can be found in the 4th field of the Kingdom of Bavaria until 1919, since 1950 in the 3rd quarter of Arms of the state of Bavaria

== Gallery ==
Veldenz

Landkreis Celle

Landkreis Gifhorn

Landkreis Harburg

Landkreis Birkenfeld

Baumholder

Berglangenbach

Berschweiler bei Baumholder

Eckersweiler

Fohren-Linden

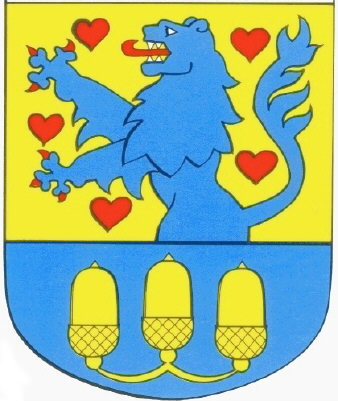
Vordorf

Hahnweiler

Leitzweiler

Mettweiler

Rohrbach (bei Baumholder)

Rückweiler

Ruschberg

Landkreis Kusel

Gammertingen

Neufra

Meisenheim

Breitenheim

Mülheim (Mosel)

County of Veldenz
