= Rohrbach, Birkenfeld =

Rohrbach
- Municipality
- Coat of arms

- Location of Rohrbach within Birkenfeld district
- Interactive map of Rohrbach
- Location within Germany Location within Rhineland-Palatinate
- Coordinates: 49°35′6″N 7°15′31″E
- Country: Germany
- State: Rhineland-Palatinate
- District: Birkenfeld
- Municipal assoc.: Baumholder

Government
  - Mayor (2019–24): Bernhard Sauer (CDU)

Area
  - Total: 2.45 km^{2} (0.95 sq mi)
- Elevation: 440 m (1,440 ft)

Population (2025-12-31)
  - Total: 173
  - Density: 70.6/km^{2} (183/sq mi)
- Time zone: UTC+01:00 (CET)
  - Summer (DST): UTC+02:00 (CEST)
- Postal codes: 55776
- Dialling codes: 06789
- Vehicle registration: BIR
- Website: www.rohrbach-nahe.de

Rohrbach (German pronunciation: [ˈʁoːɐ̯bax]) is an Ortsgemeinde – a municipality belonging to a Verbandsgemeinde, a kind of collective municipality – in the Birkenfeld district in Rhineland-Palatinate, Germany. It belongs to the Verbandsgemeinde of Baumholder, whose seat is in the like-named town.

== Geography ==
=== Location ===
The municipality lies on the like-named Rohrbach south of the Nahe at the foot of the 548.5 m-high Wüschberg.

=== Neighbouring municipalities ===
Rohrbach borders in the north on the municipality of Berglangenbach, in the east on the municipalities of Fohren-Linden and Berschweiler bei Baumholder, in the south on the municipality of Freisen in the Saarland and in the west on the municipality of Rückweiler.

== History ==
=== Names ===
The villages of Rohrbach, Rückweiler, Hahnweiler and Leitzweiler bear the tag Auf der Heide, although it is unclear why this is so. As in English, the words for “heath”, “heather” and “heathen” are similar to each other in German. Since Heidekraut (“heather”) was formerly written with an A in second position, doubt has arisen about that theory of the name's origin. It could also refer to Heiden (“heathens”). Nevertheless, the former theory is the likelier of the two, for the German word Heide formerly described a treeless, wild-growing area (as the English word “heath” still does).

Rohrbach's own name seems to have sprung from the bulrushes (Rohrkolben in German) and reeds (Schilfrohr) that once grew in abundance along the brook (Bach). These gave the brook its name, Rohrbach. This theory is easy to believe, for the lower valley of the Rohrbach is quite marshy and boggy, with soil in which such plants easily take root and grow. Later, the village was named after the brook.

=== Roman times ===
It can be said that Rohrbach does not find itself in the historical foreground, but on the other hand, there was a Roman settlement here, or somewhere nearby. Witnessing this are a number of archaeological finds of things such as gold and silver Roman coins and grave urns, which have been unearthed in the village during building work and in the local fields during digging. Iron Age cremation graves have also been found nearby in neighbouring municipalities. In the cadastral area known as Krämel, it is said that a Roman army long encamped. Another cadastral area nearby, Römermäuerchen, whose name means “Little Roman Wall”, further recalls a Roman past.

=== Middle Ages ===
When Rohrbach was founded is something that research has not yielded. Under Frankish rule, the land was carved up into Gaue, with each headed by a gaugrave (Gaugraf i.e. "Gau count"). Rohrbach belonged, together with the other “heath” villages, to the Moselgau. Under the Carolingians and Salians, the fiefdom developed. The villages of the Pflege (literally “care”, but actually a local geopolitical unit) of Rohrbach had documentary mentions in 1428, 1431 and 1440. Belonging to this Pflege were Rohrbach, Rückweiler and Leitzweiler, while Hahnweiler and Wolfersweiler were affiliated. In 1586, the Pflege was in the County Palatine of Zweibrücken's Oberamt of Lichtenberg. Each year, the Schöffe (roughly “lay jurist”) was obliged to gather in the taxes and fines from the subjects and send them to his superior, the Amtsschultheiß in Berschweiler, or to the Oberamt at Castle Lichtenberg. Moreover, from time to time, he had to render certain official services, for example at executions. His remuneration was very slight, given the low population at the time, which amounted to some 115 persons.

In 1112, Gerlach, who was Count of the Nahegau Emich's son, founded the County of Veldenz. In 1214, Count Gerlach IV founded Castle Lichtenberg. Count Gerlach V received from the Bishop of Verdun the Schirmvogtei (roughly “blanket bailiwick”) over the Amt of Wolfersweiler, to which Rohrbach, among other places, belonged. Shortly thereafter, however, he had to forgo the greater part of his new acquisition, but Wolfersweiler, along with Rohrbach, the Count of Veldenz managed to keep.

In 1386, Johann von Lewenstein paid Count of Veldenz Heinrich 100 Gulden (roughly equivalent to €4000 or €5000 in modern funds) for his villages, courts, paupers, water and meadowland at “Roirbach, Zingswilre und Rickwilre” along with three bondsmen outside these villages.

In 1428, the Count of Veldenz awarded the court fief to the House of Winterbecher. Three years later, half of each of the two villages of Rohrbach and Rückweiler, along with their people, interest payments and earnings, were under Count of Sponheim Wolf's ownership. He in turn sold the rights along with other goods and sources of income for almost 500 Gulden to Count of Veldenz Friedrich.

The other halves of the fiefs of Rohrbach and Rückweiler were held by the family Gauwer von Lichtenberg, and thereafter by Hildebrand von Boxberg. Owing to disputes between Count of Veldenz Stephan and Lord of Oberstein Wyrich von Dhaun, a judicial decision on 26 January 1440 stipulated that the Boxberg fief of Rohrbach, Rückweiler and Würtzweiler was to be awarded in whole to the House of Veldenz.

In 1444, the House of Veldenz died out in its male line. There was a daughter left, Anna. She wed Stephen, Count Palatine of Simmern-Zweibrücken. Ownership of the former Veldenz holdings, including Rohrbach, later passed in whole from Count Stephen to his second son, Louis I, Count Palatine of Zweibrücken, continuing down through that line. During this time, Rohrbach belonged to the Amt of Nohfelden and the Oberamt of Lichtenberg.

According to the 1477 Lichtenberg taxation book, levies for the Rohrbach court district payable to the lord amounted to 11.5 Malter of corn (it is not specified which grain this was), 23 Malter of oats and 12 Kappen. A Malter was something between 80 and 90 kg, while a Kappe was a small measure).

On 15 October 1571, Count Palatine Johann, in his own, his brother Wilhelm's and his cousin Ruprecht's names, enfeoffed Wolfgang Blick von Lichtenberg with the Veldenz fief, which his parents had owned after Boxberg's death, together with, among other things, shares in the villages of Rohrbach and Rückweiler and tithing rights in Rohrbach.

In 1580 and 1581, Duke Johannes I had some silver prospecting undertaken at “Michaels-Bergwerk” (“Michael’s Mine”) near Rohrbach, to ease his subjects’ poverty. The idea had to be given up, though, as it turned out there was no silver deposit.

The village's poverty became all the more apparent a few years later, in 1586, when Rohrbach and Freisen were assigned a shared plot of meadowland measuring 150 Morgen: the village could not afford its share of the herdsman's wages. So, livestock from outside was also allowed to use the meadow, and the Brothers Böschhan, butchers from Baumholder, were given leave to graze their herd there, too.

In 1620, at the Schaumburg Amtmann’s instigation, 74 sheep were pledged by the people of Freisen to the Brothers Böschhan. The Lorrainian Lord of Eberstein assigned the debt to the people of Rohrbach, because they had supposedly breached Lorrainian national custom. After the Brothers Böschhan had redeemed the herd at high cost, the Lord of Eberstein was satisfied.

On 5 October 1620, the Schultheiß of Baumholder, named Eichhorn, issued a report about Rohrbach to the Oberamt in connection with the above dispute over the sheep-pledging arrangement. Among other things, he characterized the village as being very run down. Before he had become Schultheiß, most of the houses had been allowed to fall into disrepair. The smithy owner, Hans Storrer, was singled out for not only letting his own house go to rack and ruin, but also for tearing empty buildings apart to sell beams and other building materials to outsiders. Eichhorn's report ended with a request that the authorities grant him building wood so that he might build the village back up.

=== Early modern times ===
In 1675, after the Thirty Years' War, there were only two families left in Rohrbach. By 1790, however, there were 24 households. This war also took its toll on the local livestock: in 1635, the Imperial general Matthias Gallas conquered the Oberamt of Lichtenberg, leaving only one cow standing.

In 1733, the land passed to the Birkenfeld-Bischweiler line. Also in the 18th century, many people emigrated out of economic need. In 1741, Jakob Meyer left with four children, and in 1766, Michel Danneck left with four persons. All went to America (the United States did not yet exist).

In 1789, a new disagreement arose when Freisen was asked to plant coppices, and chose to do this in the cadastral area known as Hundklopp. Rohrbach protested because Hundklopp was meant to be commonly held grazing land, and the village was entitled, under an agreement on grazing land, to a livestock path that gave access to livestock watering. It was eventually decided that only a fourth of the land would be planted with coppice.

=== French Revolution and Napoleonic times ===
This problem, though, paled next to the one that began that same year, namely the French Revolution. In its wake, Rohrbach, having formerly belonged to the Amt of Berschweiler, and for a short while to the Amt of Nohfelden, was assigned under French rule, beginning in 1793, to the Mairie (“Mayoralty”) of Berschweiler in the canton of Baumholder. In 1819, there were 128 inhabitants in Rohrbach living in 19 houses.

=== Principality of Lichtenberg ===
With Napoleon’s downfall and the Congress of Vienna, Rohrbach and the surrounding area became part of the Duchy of Saxe-Coburg-Saalfeld as the Principality of Lichtenberg. This arrangement lasted until 1834 when, by treaty, the Principality was incorporated into the Prussian state as the Sankt Wendel district. Twelve years later, Rohrbach burnt to ashes in a fire of unknown origin. A smaller fire in 1891 claimed two houses.

At the time the school was built in 1876, the village had 40 houses. Roughly one third of them had upper floors, while the rest were bungalows. All were roofed with either slate or tiles. Beside a house usually stood a stable, then the barn, and then another stable.

=== Imperial Germany ===
After the Franco-Prussian War in 1870/1871, some small farmers from Rohrbach moved to the neighbouring Saar area to work in the mines or ironworks. Before the First World War, some 30 men from Rohrbach were employed in the Saar area. The men spent the workweek at their jobs away from the village, sleeping in dormitories on site, and coming home only on weekends. This difficulty kept many from taking up jobs as miners, leaving them only with farming as a livelihood. Often this was not enough, and malnutrition was rife. It could be seen in schoolchildren's languor and pallor.

In 1906, Rohrbach had a watermain, which came at a cost of 13,000 to 14,000 marks. Building work on the church began in 1907, and this cost roughly 48,000 marks.

When the First World War broke out on 2 August 1914, 25 fighters left the village to go to war. Twelve fell in action; a further four were taken prisoner.

=== Weimar Germany ===
In 1922, Rohrbach was hooked up to the Baumholder district power station, although electricity was, given the financial difficulties at that time, quite dear. In 1923, the French franc was introduced as a currency. Along with other misfortunes in the 1920s, foot-and-mouth disease struck in 1926.

The first radio made its appearance in Rohrbach in 1928. In 1930, there was a celebration when the French finally withdrew from the Rhineland in 1930.

=== Nazi Germany ===
In 1933, Adolf Hitler became German Chancellor, marking the birth of the Third Reich, and on 10 July of that same year, a Nazi named Johann Knop was installed as the head of the municipality of Rohrbach. On 1 March 1935, the Saarland was returned to German sovereignty, causing much excitement in the local area, as many believed that this event would alleviate unemployment. Also this year, Hitler introduced conscription. In 1939, the Second World War began.

The war came home to Rohrbach: in 1940, a twin-engine bomber had to make an emergency landing on the Halterskopf, in 1943, there was an aerial engagement above the village, and of course, the village was occupied in 1945. This happened at about ten o’clock in the morning on 18 March, and the village did not fall without a fight. American tanks and German infantry engaged each other, resulting in four deaths on the German side.

=== Since the Second World War ===
Twelve OST-Arbeiter went home, and by 29 May 1945, the first men from Rohrbach who had gone to war came home. The last homecoming, though, did not happen until 21 July 1949. Under Allied occupation, there were many house searches. Refugees from the Saarland showed up. Nine men from Rohrbach had fallen in the war, and a further four had gone missing (a memorial to them was dedicated in 1961). In 1946, a census yielded a population figure for Rohrbach of 217, of whom 202 were Catholic and the other 15 Protestant.

In 1948 came currency reform, and the Deutsche Mark became the currency. One Deutsche Mark was worth 10 of the old Reichsmarks. Also, sewerage came in 1952. A volunteer fire brigade was established in 1957. In 1958, there were six American families living in Rohrbach, and the number of cars in the village amounted to six. In 1959, there was one television set in the village, and in 1960, Flurbereinigung was completed. In 1969, Rohrbach expressed a wish to be amalgamated with nearby Freisen; its population at this time was 286.

Rohrbach families have twice had triplets in recent decades, with one set born in 1984 (Diana, Christina and Jessica) and another in 1997 (Hannah, Marie and Lukas). In 1989, the municipality elected its first woman municipal councillor, Christine Niegisch. In 1995, “pot patches” were discovered in Rohrbach.

== Politics ==
=== Municipal council ===
The council is made up of 6 council members, who were elected by majority vote at the municipal election held on 7 June 2009, and the honorary mayor as chairman.

=== Mayor ===
Rohrbach's mayor is Bernhard Sauer, and his deputies are Franz-Josef Ley and Ignatius Forster.

=== Coat of arms ===
The municipality's arms might be described thus: Per fess argent issuant from the line of partition a demilion azure armed and langued gules, and vert a bend sinister wavy abased issuant from which two bulrushes Or.

The charge in the upper field, the lion, is a reference to the village's former allegiance to the County of Veldenz. The charges in the lower field are canting for the village's name, Rohrbach, which roughly translated means “Bulrush Brook”.

== Culture and sightseeing ==
The municipality of Rohrbach was featured on 10 September 2009 on the SWR3 programme Hierzuland, showing its village life and clubs. Along with clubs such as the “Tell” shooting club, the volunteer fire brigade, the Auf zur Heide carrier pigeon club, the angling club, the Catholic women's association, „Schrillen Grillen“ e.V. (dancing and Carnival) and the promotional association with its many unpaid helpers, there are also those who do their best to maintain the village's traditions.

== Economy and infrastructure ==
Rohrbach has a village community centre.

=== Transport ===
Running south of the municipality is the Autobahn A 62 (Kaiserslautern–Trier). Serving nearby Heimbach is a railway station on the Nahe Valley Railway (Bingen–Saarbrücken).

=== Economy ===
In days gone by, Rohrbach was purely a farming village, with cropraising and livestock raising. Later, some people worked at the coalfields and ironworks along the Saar. In recent decades, though, the village has undergone a great shift in economic structure. There are no longer any full-time farmers. Those who work go to jobs in the surrounding area (in Baumholder, for instance), with a few even going as far as Ludwigshafen each day. Over the last few decades, the population figure has been shrinking as young people choose to move away after their studies or apprenticeship, seeing not much in the way of job prospects locally, and greener pastures elsewhere.
