= Hahnweiler =

- Municipality
- Coat of arms

- Location of Hahnweiler within Birkenfeld district
- Interactive map of Hahnweiler
- Location within Germany Location within Rhineland-Palatinate
- Coordinates: 49°34′N 7°13′E
- Country: Germany
- State: Rhineland-Palatinate
- District: Birkenfeld
- Municipal assoc.: Baumholder

Government
  - Mayor (2019–24): Heiko Bier

Area
  - Total: 2.28 km^{2} (0.88 sq mi)
- Elevation: 500 m (1,600 ft)

Population (2025-12-31)
  - Total: 176
  - Density: 77.2/km^{2} (200/sq mi)
- Time zone: UTC+01:00 (CET)
  - Summer (DST): UTC+02:00 (CEST)
- Postal codes: 55776
- Dialling codes: 06789
- Vehicle registration: BIR
- Website: www.hahnweiler.de

Hahnweiler (German pronunciation: [ˈhaːnvaɪlɐ]) is an Ortsgemeinde – a municipality belonging to a Verbandsgemeinde, a kind of collective municipality – in the Birkenfeld district in Rhineland-Palatinate, Germany. It belongs to the Verbandsgemeinde of Baumholder, whose seat is in the like-named town.

== Geography ==
=== Location ===
The municipality lies in the Hunsrück at the southwesternmost end of the Birkenfeld district and the Verbandsgemeinde of Baumholder. In the south it borders on the Saarland. With its 218 inhabitants – which includes those who hold only a secondary residence here – (as at 31 January 2011), Hahnweiler is the third smallest municipality in the Verbandsgemeinde. By land area – the municipal area measures only 228.5 ha – it is the smallest. Its elevation ranges between 450 and 552 m above sea level.

=== Neighbouring municipalities ===
Hahnweiler borders in the northeast on Rückweiler, in the south on Freisen in the Saarland, in the west on Gimbweiler and Nohfelden-Wolfersweiler, also in the Saarland, and in the north on Leitzweiler.

== History ==
Hahnweiler, or Hanwilre as it was known in the Middle Ages, belonged to the comital House of Tholey holdings in the Moselgau (a territory that stretched along the Moselle). The Vogtei rights over the Moselgau were granted Count Gerlach V in 1235 by the Bishop of Verdun. By 1397, Count Friedrich von Veldenz had bought from Geretrud Broich, her son Emmerich and his wife the estate, along with its serfs, interests and rights at Hanwilre and Moysberg (now Mosberg, part of Mosberg-Richweiler, itself an outlying centre of Nohfelden) for 50 Rhenish guilders. In the time that followed, the village belonged to the Amt of Nohfelden and thereby to the Oberamt of Lichtenberg. After the Nohfelden Gerichtsweistum (a Weistum – cognate with English wisdom – was a legal pronouncement issued by men learned in law in the Middle Ages and early modern times; Gericht means “court”), the rightful judges of the high court were deemed to be the Counts Palatine of Zweibrücken. Hahnweiler was part of the great fief given Wirich II of Oberstein in 1432 by the Duke of Lorraine. The 1480 Bede register (the Bede was a kind of taxation) lists for Hahnweiler two inhabitants who had to pay the May Bede and three who had to pay the autumn Bede. Wendel Gelzenleichter, his wife Agnes, son Nickel and daughter Elisa from Hahnweiler were Oberstein serfs in 1603. Wendel performed “along with the thresher at Hanwiller and his fellow heirs at Berßwiller a goods transport for the Count of Oberstein. As to further compulsory service, the said Wendel yearly gave the Count some money, about 1 Thaler. What else he yearly gave in money and produce in levies has not been determined.”

The 1675 description of the Oberamt compiled by D. König after the Thirty Years' War counted two families in Hahnweiler, while 115 years later, there were 18 families in the village. In 1816, 13 houses, 14 families and 94 souls were counted. The village’s Reformed parishioners were parochially bound with Wolfersweiler before French Revolutionary times, and thereafter with Berschweiler. The Catholics belonged to the parish of Freisen. Until 1793, Hahnweiler was part of the Zweibrücken Amt of Nohfelden. The municipal boundary between Hahnweiler and Rückweiler was also the old boundary between the Rohrbach and Nohfelden court regions. During the French occupation, the village belonged to the Mairie (“Mayoralty”) of Nohfelden in the canton of Baumholder. Beginning in 1819, after the Congress of Vienna, it was part of the Bürgermeisterei (also “Mayoralty”) of Berschweiler. In 1819, Hahnweiler had 13 families and 107 souls; by 1843, these figures had grown to 21 and 131 respectively.

== Politics ==
=== Municipal council ===
The council is made up of 6 council members, who were elected by majority vote at the municipal election held on 7 June 2009, and the honorary mayor as chairman.

=== Mayors ===
Hahnweiler’s mayor is Heiko Bier.

The following is a list of Hahnweiler’s mayors since 1936. The gap between 1938 and 1945 represents a loss of official records from the time of the Third Reich.

- 1936-1938 Otto Stephan
- 1945-1952 Otto Haupenthal
- 1952-1956 Josef Becker
- 1956-1961 Emil Bier
- 1961-1969 Bernhard Werle
- 1969-1979 Otto Schmitt
- 1979-1988 Günter Mohr
- 1988-1999 Hermann Bier
- 1999-2004 Axel Mohr
- 2004-2015 Dietmar Schmitt
- 2015- Heiko Bier

=== Coat of arms ===
The municipality’s arms might be described thus: Per fess argent a demilion azure armed and langued gules, and vert a cock sinister crowing, his sinister leg raised, Or.

The charge in the upper field, the demilion, is a reference to the village’s former allegiance to the County of Veldenz. The cock (Hahn in German) is canting for the municipality’s name.

== Economy and infrastructure ==
Hahnweiler has a village community centre.

=== Transport ===
Directly to the north runs the Autobahn A 62 (Kaiserslautern–Trier). Available in nearby Heimbach is a railway station on the Nahe Valley Railway (Bingen–Saarbrücken).
