= Ruschberg =

- Municipality
- Coat of arms

- Location of Ruschberg within Birkenfeld district
- Interactive map of Ruschberg
- Location within Germany Location within Rhineland-Palatinate
- Coordinates: 49°37′18″N 7°17′24″E
- Country: Germany
- State: Rhineland-Palatinate
- District: Birkenfeld
- Municipal assoc.: Baumholder

Government
  - Mayor (2019–24): Alfred Heu

Area
  - Total: 7.45 km^{2} (2.88 sq mi)
- Elevation: 410 m (1,350 ft)

Population (2025-12-31)
  - Total: 771
  - Density: 103/km^{2} (268/sq mi)
- Time zone: UTC+01:00 (CET)
  - Summer (DST): UTC+02:00 (CEST)
- Postal codes: 55776
- Dialling codes: 06783
- Vehicle registration: BIR

Ruschberg (German pronunciation: [ˈʁʊʃbɛʁk]) is an Ortsgemeinde – a municipality belonging to a Verbandsgemeinde, a kind of collective municipality – in the Birkenfeld district in Rhineland-Palatinate, Germany. It belongs to the Verbandsgemeinde of Baumholder, whose seat is in the like-named town.

== Geography ==
=== Location ===
Ruschberg lies on the Baumholder Bach southwest of the 563 m-high Feldberg. It also lies in the Westrich, an historic region that encompasses areas in both Germany and France.

=== Neighbouring municipalities ===
Ruschberg borders in the north on the Baumholder Troop Drilling Ground, in the east on the town of Baumholder, in the southeast on the municipality of Fohren-Linden, in the southwest on the municipality of Berglangenbach, in the west on the municipality of Heimbach and in the northwest on the municipality of Reichenbach.

=== Constituent communities ===
Also belonging to Ruschberg are the outlying homesteads of Clarashall (baryte mine), Haus Mohrenmühle, Im Inkelrech, Lauersmühle and Seibertsmühle.

== Politics ==
=== Municipal council ===
The council is made up of 12 council members, who were elected by proportional representation at the municipal election held on 7 June 2009, and the honorary mayor as chairman.

The municipal election held on 7 June 2009 yielded the following results:

Year	SPD	CDU	Total
2009	8	4	12 seats
2004	8	4	12 seats

=== Mayor ===
Ruschberg's mayor is Alfred Heu.

=== Coat of arms ===
The municipality's arms might be described thus: Per fess, argent issuant from the line of partition a demilion azure armed and langued gules, and azure a hammer and pick per saltire of the first surmounted by an ear of wheat between two ears of rye all couped, palewise and Or.

== Culture and sightseeing ==
=== Clubs ===
- Catholic women's club
- Eschelbacher Natur- und Angelfreunde (friends of nature and angling)
- Evangelische Frauenhilfe (Evangelical women's aid)
- Fußballclub 1921 (football)
- Mixed choir
- Ruschberg “Germania” music club
- Shooting club
- Sport club
- VdK local chapter (service club)
- Volunteer fire brigade

== Economy and infrastructure ==
=== Public institutions ===
- Evangelical church, parish of Baumholder
- Catholic church, parish of Baumholder
- Kindergarten Ruschberg
- Ruschberg primary school
- Ruschberg youth club
- Bürgerhaus Ruschberg (community centre)

=== Transport ===
Running a few kilometres south of the municipality is the Autobahn A 62 (Kaiserslautern–Trier). Serving nearby Heimbach is a railway station on the Nahe Valley Railway (Bingen–Saarbrücken). There has been no railway station in Ruschberg itself since the 1981 when the Heimbach (Nahe)–Baumholder Railway ceased passenger operations.
