= Eckersweiler =

- Municipality
- Coat of arms

- Location of Eckersweiler within Birkenfeld district
- Interactive map of Eckersweiler
- Location within Germany Location within Rhineland-Palatinate
- Coordinates: 49°33′33.0552″N 7°17′29.2812″E
- Country: Germany
- State: Rhineland-Palatinate
- District: Birkenfeld
- Municipal assoc.: Baumholder

Government
  - Mayor (2019–24): Hans-Peter Bohr

Area
  - Total: 3.69 km^{2} (1.42 sq mi)
- Elevation: 500 m (1,600 ft)

Population (2025-12-31)
  - Total: 186
  - Density: 50.4/km^{2} (131/sq mi)
- Time zone: UTC+01:00 (CET)
  - Summer (DST): UTC+02:00 (CEST)
- Postal codes: 55777
- Dialling codes: 06783
- Vehicle registration: BIR
- Website: www.eckersweiler.de

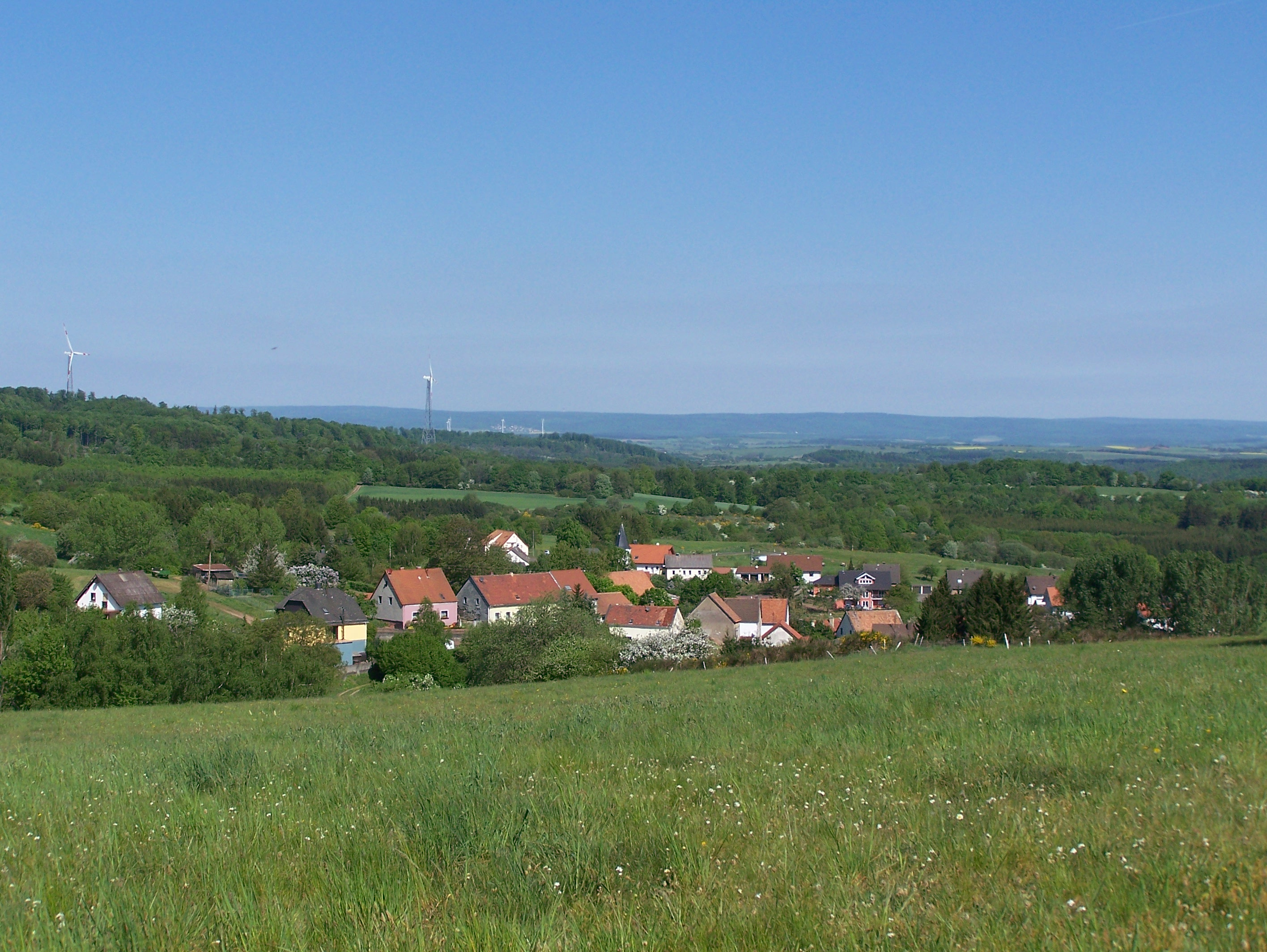
Eckersweiler

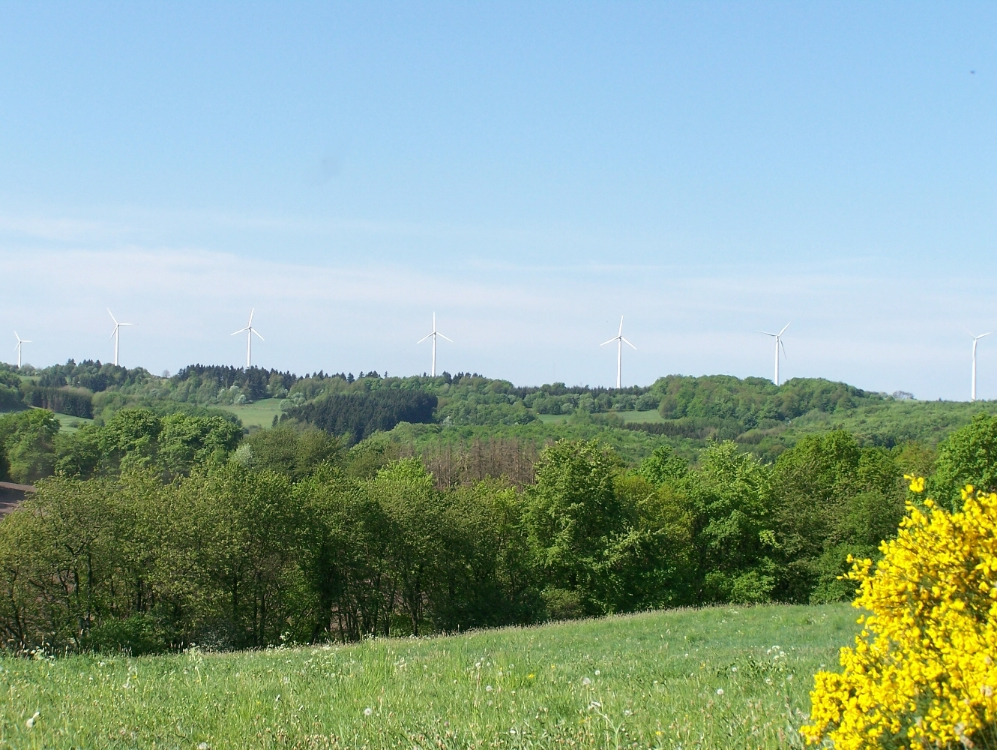
Countryside near Eckersweiler

Eckersweiler is an Ortsgemeinde – a municipality belonging to a Verbandsgemeinde, a kind of collective municipality – in the Birkenfeld district in Rhineland-Palatinate, Germany. It belongs to the Verbandsgemeinde of Baumholder, whose seat is in the like-named town.

== Geography ==
=== Location ===
The municipality lies in the Westrich, an historic region that encompasses areas in both Germany and France, on the boundary with the Saarland. Eckersweiler is the district's southernmost municipality.

=== Neighbouring municipalities ===
Eckersweiler borders in the north on the municipality of Berschweiler bei Baumholder, in the east on the municipality of Thallichtenberg (Kusel district), in the south on the municipality of Reichweiler (Kusel district) and in the west on the municipality of Freisen (Sankt Wendel district, Saarland).

== Politics ==
=== Municipal council ===
The council is made up of 6 council members, who were elected by majority vote at the municipal election held on 7 June 2009, and the honorary mayor as chairman.

=== Mayor ===
Eckersweiler's mayor is Hans-Peter Bohr, and his deputies are Helmut Rausch and Paul Dinges.

=== Coat of arms ===
The German blazon reads: In geteiltem Schild oben ein wachsender rotbewehrter und -gezungter blauer Löwe in Silber, unten in Blau ein silberner Turm mit Turmhelm.

The municipality's arms might in English heraldic language be described thus: Per fess argent a demilion issuant from the line of partition azure armed and langued gules, and azure a tower with roof of the first.

The blue lion is a reference to the village's former allegiance to the County of Veldenz. The tower depicts the village's churchtower, which stands under monumental protection.

The arms have been borne since 10 January 1964.

== Culture and sightseeing ==
=== Buildings ===
The following are listed buildings or sites in Rhineland-Palatinate’s Directory of Cultural Monuments:

- Evangelical church, Hauptstraße 1 – aisleless church, 1758; west tower with octagonal roof, 1169 or about 1470

Eckersweiler's village midpoint was ranked as worth seeing in Birkenfeld district's local Agenda 21.

== Economy and infrastructure ==
Eckersweiler has a village community centre, and to the south lies the Autobahn A 62 (Kaiserslautern–Trier).
