= Mettweiler =

- Municipality
- Coat of arms

- Location of Mettweiler within Birkenfeld district
- Interactive map of Mettweiler
- Location within Germany Location within Rhineland-Palatinate
- Coordinates: 49°34′48″N 7°18′55″E
- Country: Germany
- State: Rhineland-Palatinate
- District: Birkenfeld
- Municipal assoc.: Baumholder

Government
  - Mayor (2019–24): Ute Theiß

Area
  - Total: 5.50 km^{2} (2.12 sq mi)
- Elevation: 445 m (1,460 ft)

Population (2025-12-31)
  - Total: 245
  - Density: 44.5/km^{2} (115/sq mi)
- Time zone: UTC+01:00 (CET)
  - Summer (DST): UTC+02:00 (CEST)
- Postal codes: 55777
- Dialling codes: 06783
- Vehicle registration: BIR

Mettweiler is an Ortsgemeinde – a municipality belonging to a Verbandsgemeinde, a kind of collective municipality – in the Birkenfeld district in Rhineland-Palatinate, Germany. It belongs to the Verbandsgemeinde of Baumholder, whose seat is in the like-named town.

== Geography ==
=== Location ===
The municipality lies in the Westrich, an historic region that encompasses areas in both Germany and France. The municipal area is 47% wooded.

=== Neighbouring municipalities ===
Mettweiler borders in the north on the town of Baumholder, in the southeast on the municipality of Thallichtenberg and in the west on the municipalities of Berschweiler bei Baumholder and Fohren-Linden.

== Politics ==
=== Municipal council ===
The council is made up of 6 council members, who were elected by majority vote at the municipal election held on 7 June 2009, and the honorary mayor as chairman.

=== Mayor ===
Mettweiler's mayor is Ute Theiß.

=== Coat of arms ===
The municipality's arms might be described thus: Per fess argent issuant from the line of partition a demilion azure armed and langued gules, and azure two ears of wheat couped per saltire surmounted by a bell Or.

The charge in the upper part of the escutcheon, the lion, is a reference to the village's former allegiance to the County of Veldenz.

== Culture and sightseeing ==
=== Regular events ===
Each year, a kermis and a Brunnenfest (“Fountain Festival”) are held.

== Economy and infrastructure ==
=== Transport ===
To the south runs the Autobahn A 62 (Kaiserslautern–Trier). Serving nearby Heimbach is a railway station on the Nahe Valley Railway (Bingen–Saarbrücken).
