= Berglangenbach =

- Municipality
- Coat of arms

- Location of Berglangenbach within Birkenfeld district
- Interactive map of Berglangenbach
- Location within Germany Location within Rhineland-Palatinate
- Coordinates: 49°35′58″N 7°15′9″E
- Country: Germany
- State: Rhineland-Palatinate
- District: Birkenfeld
- Municipal assoc.: Baumholder

Government
  - Mayor (2019–24): Kurt Jenet

Area
  - Total: 5.73 km^{2} (2.21 sq mi)
- Elevation: 400 m (1,300 ft)

Population (2025-12-31)
  - Total: 464
  - Density: 81.0/km^{2} (210/sq mi)
- Time zone: UTC+01:00 (CET)
  - Summer (DST): UTC+02:00 (CEST)
- Postal codes: 55776
- Dialling codes: 06789
- Vehicle registration: BIR
- Website: www.berglangenbach.de

Berglangenbach is an Ortsgemeinde – a municipality belonging to a Verbandsgemeinde, a kind of collective municipality – in the Birkenfeld district in Rhineland-Palatinate, Germany. It belongs to the Verbandsgemeinde of Baumholder, whose seat is in the like-named town.

== Geography ==
=== Location ===
Berglangenbach belongs to the Westrich, an historic region that encompasses areas in both Germany and France, and lies between the Hunsrück and the North Palatine Uplands, near the state boundary with the Saarland. Berglangenbach lies roughly 5 km west of Baumholder and 8 km southeast of Birkenfeld.

=== Land use ===
Berglangenbach's municipal area measures 573 ha, of which, roughly, 21 ha is built up, 266 ha is given over to agriculture, 213 ha is wooded, 65 ha is designated greenbelt and 8 ha is areas dedicated to streets, parks and the like.

=== Neighbouring municipalities ===
Clockwise from the north, these are Heimbach to the north, Fohren-Linden to the east, Rohrbach and Rückweiler to the south and Leitzweiler to the southwest.

=== Constituent communities ===
Also belonging to Berglangenbach are the outlying homesteads of Bächelshöfe and Zinkweilerhof.

== Politics ==
=== Municipal council ===
The council is made up of 8 council members, who were elected by majority vote at the municipal election held on 7 June 2009, and the honorary mayor as chairman.

=== Mayor ===
Berglangenbach's mayor is Kurt Jenet.

=== Coat of arms ===
The German blazon reads: Im geteiltem Schild oben in Silber ein wachsender rotbewehrter und rotgezungter blauer Löwe, unten in Grün ein erhöhter, silberener Dreiberg, belegt mit blauem Wellenband.

The municipality's arms might in English heraldic language be described thus: Per fess argent a demilion azure armed and langued gules, and vert a mount of three enhanced of the first surmounted by a fess wavy of the second.

The charge above the line of partition is a reference to the village's former allegiance to the County of Veldenz. Below the line of partition, the field tincture vert (green) symbolizes the agriculture practised in the municipality, while the “mount of three” (a charge known in German as a Dreiberg) and the wavy fess (horizontal stripe) are canting charges for the municipality's name (Berg = mountain; Bach = brook).

The arms have been borne since 8 July 1965, when they were approved by Rhineland-Palatinate Ministry of the Interior decree.

== Culture and sightseeing ==
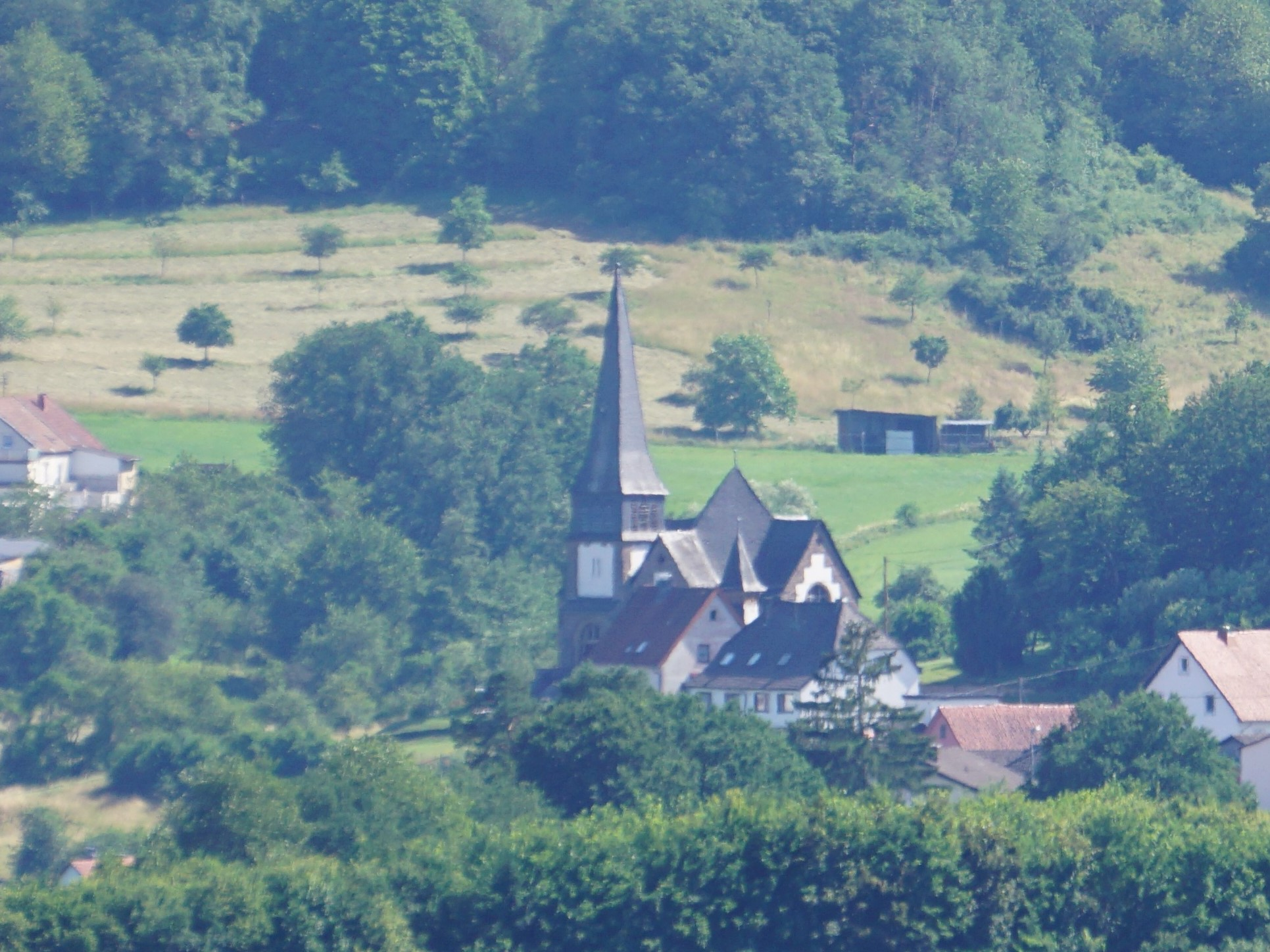
Evangelical Church of Berglangenbach

=== Buildings ===
The following are listed buildings or sites in Rhineland-Palatinate’s Directory of Cultural Monuments:

- Evangelical church, Kirchenweg – historicized volcanic-rock building, partly plastered, 1906/1907, architect August Senz, Düsseldorf
- Beside Hauptstraße 37 – small smithy, possibly from the early 20th century; equipment

=== Regular events ===
The farmer's and craftsmen's market is held each year in September. Also held once a year is the kermis (church consecration festival, locally known as the Kerb).

== Economy and infrastructure ==
Berglangenbach has a village community centre and a market hall.

To the south runs the Autobahn A 62 (Kaiserslautern–Trier). The nearest railway station is in nearby Heimbach, on the Nahe Valley Railway (Bingen–Saarbrücken).
