= Hoppstädten-Weiersbach =

- Municipality
- Coat of arms

- Location of Hoppstädten-Weiersbach within Birkenfeld district
- Interactive map of Hoppstädten-Weiersbach
- Location within Germany Location within Rhineland-Palatinate
- Coordinates: 49°37′N 7°12′E
- Country: Germany
- State: Rhineland-Palatinate
- District: Birkenfeld
- Municipal assoc.: Birkenfeld
- Subdivisions: 3

Government
  - Mayor (2019–24): Peter Heyda (SPD)

Area
  - Total: 17.86 km^{2} (6.90 sq mi)
- Elevation: 374 m (1,227 ft)

Population (2025-12-31)
  - Total: 3,348
  - Density: 187.5/km^{2} (485.5/sq mi)
- Time zone: UTC+01:00 (CET)
  - Summer (DST): UTC+02:00 (CEST)
- Postal codes: 55768
- Dialling codes: 06782
- Vehicle registration: BIR
- Website: www.hoppstaedten-weiersbach.de

Hoppstädten-Weiersbach is an Ortsgemeinde – a municipality belonging to a Verbandsgemeinde, a kind of collective municipality – in the Birkenfeld district in Rhineland-Palatinate, Germany. It belongs to the Verbandsgemeinde of Birkenfeld, whose seat is in the like-named town.

== Location ==
The municipality lies in neither the Hunsrück nor the Palatinate, but rather near the boundary with the Saarland in the Nahe valley in the Upper Nahe Uplands (Oberes Nahebergland), part of the Saar-Nahe Hills (Saar-Nahe-Bergland). The countryside and the municipality itself are characterized by the Hoppstädt Nahe valley, a broad floodplain with vast meadowlands and wooded mountain slopes on both sides. These mountains are known as the Hoppstädter Berg and the Weiersbacher Berg. Lying higher up are great cropfields. Many parts of the Nahe valley between Hoppstädten-Weiersbach and Idar-Oberstein have been left in their natural state and, accordingly, in 1991, parts of it were declared a scenic conservation area (Landschaftsschutzgebiet).

== Constituent communities ==
Hoppstädten-Weiersbach's Ortsteile are Hoppstädten, Weiersbach (with Bleiderdingen) and Neubrücke.

== History ==
In the Middle Ages, the villages of Weiersbach and Hoppstädten, along with Leitzweiler, Heimbach and Freisen, belonged to the lordship of Werdenstein. It was a sideline of the Lords of Oberstein who first named themselves Werdenstein, after the lordship. Jakob von Eberstein married the daughter who held hereditary rights, and about 1550 he built the castle that bore the same name. It stood between the municipality's two main centres and had been completely dismantled by the early 19th century.

In the outlying centre of Neubrücke in 1944 and 1945, the Hinzert concentration camp maintained a satellite camp.

Also at Neubrücke, on a 44-hectare lot, the United States Army set up its 98th General Hospital in 1952. The emergency and reserve hospital had at its disposal 1,000 beds and various medical departments for, among others, surgery, dentistry, orthopaedics, radiology, rehabilitation and ophthalmology. A complete hospital train was kept standing by at all times. In 1994, the hospital was closed.

The hospital's former lands now house the Environmental Campus Birkenfeld (Umwelt-Campus Birkenfeld), a branch of the Trier University of Applied Sciences.

The municipality of Hoppstädten-Weiersbach was newly formed on 7 June 1969 from the two dissolved municipalities of Hoppstädten and Weiersbach.

== Politics ==
=== Municipal council ===
The council is made up of 20 council members, who were elected by proportional representation at the municipal election held on 25 May 2014, and the honorary mayor as chairman.

The municipal election held on 25 May 2014 yielded the following results:

	SPD	CDU	WGR	Total
2014	7	10	3	20 seats
2009	6	11	3	20 seats
2004	5	13	2	20 seats

=== Mayor ===
Hoppstädten-Weiersbach's mayor is Peter Heyda (SPD).

=== Coat of arms ===
The municipality's arms might be described thus: Per fess sable issuant from the line of partition a demilion Or armed, langued and crowned gules, and argent a pale wavy azure between a wheel spoked of four, the rim couped between the two uppermost spokes of the third and the hub surmounted by the blade of a sword palewise of the first the hilt and pommel of the third, and a factory of the third with five windows and a door of the first.

The arms are a fusion of both Hoppstädten's and Weiersbach's former arms from the time before the 1969 merger.

== Culture and sightseeing ==
=== Buildings ===
The following are listed buildings or sites in Rhineland-Palatinate’s Directory of Cultural Monuments:

==== Hoppstädten ====
- Saint Catherine's Catholic Church (Kirche St. Katharinen), Hauptstraße – aisleless church with ridge turret, 1787; in the east wall a wayside cross, marked 1724
- Saarstraße 19 – railway station of the former Rhein-Nahe-Bahn (railway); built to standard plan; one- or two-floor sandstone-framed brick building
- Saarstraße 20 – seven-axis house, 1870; characterizes square's and village's appearance
- Rhein-Nahe-Bahn railway bridge – four-arch sandstone bridge over the Steinaubach, 1880
- Jewish graveyard, east of the village on the slope of the Eborner Berg (monumental zone) – 168 gravestones, 1770 to 1958; on the older part of the graveyard sandstone tomb slabs with fragments of Hebrew inscriptions preserved; biggest Jewish graveyard in the broader area

==== Weiersbach ====
- Saint Mark's Catholic Parish Church (Pfarrkirche St. Markus), in Bleiderdingen – aisleless church 1738/1739, lengthening and west tower 1862; Gothic quire, before 1235; décor
- In Bleiderdingen/corner of Auf dem Sand – wayside cross, Station cross, marked 1847
- Roadbridge, between Hoppstädten and Bleiderdingen – three-arch sandstone quarrystone bridge over the Nahe

== Economy and infrastructure ==
=== Transport ===
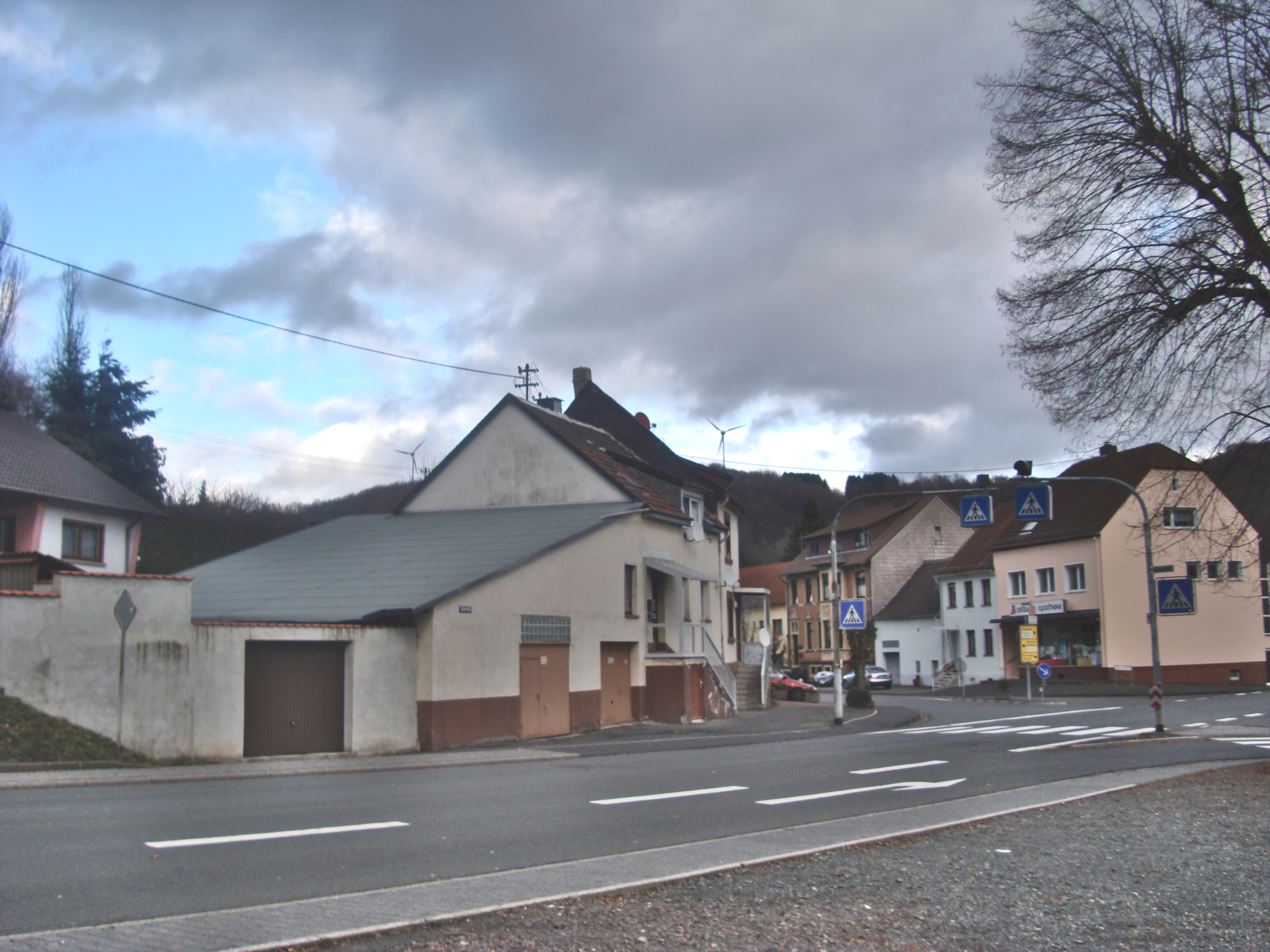
Hoppstadten seen from the train stop

Hoppstädten-Weiersbach lies on the Autobahn A 62 (Kaiserslautern–Trier) near the Birkenfeld interchange (indeed, nearer than Birkenfeld itself), and also on the Nahe Valley Railway (Bingen–Saarbrücken), which here runs concurrently with the important Saarbrücken-Mainz link. There is a regional railway station in the municipality, Neubrücke (Nahe) station, and a further halt called Hoppstädten-Weiersbach in Hoppstädten.

Between the municipality's two main centres of Hoppstädten and Weiersbach lies the Hoppstädten-Weiersbach Special Airfield (ICAO code: EDRH).

Hoppstädten-Weiersbach is the location of the Landessammelstelle für radioaktive Abfälle (“State Collection Point for Radioactive Waste”) of the Rhineland-Palatinate State Office for the Environment, Water Management and Trade Supervision (LUWG).

== Famous people ==
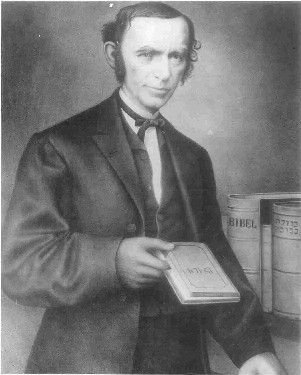
David Einhorn

- David Einhorn (b. 10 November 1809 in Diespeck; d. 2 November 1879 in New York), from 1842 to 1847 Rabbi of Hoppstädten and State Rabbi of the Principality of Birkenfeld.
- Alex Lewin (b. 5 October 1888 in Adelsheim; d. 1942 at Auschwitz), last State Rabbi of the Oldenburg Principality of Birkenfeld with seat and home in Hoppstädten.
- Hinton Battle (b. 29 November 1956), American actor, singer, dancer, and dance instructor
