= Baumholder (Verbandsgemeinde) =

- Verbandsgemeinde
- Location of Baumholder within Birkenfeld district
- Interactive map of Baumholder
- Location within Germany Location within Rhineland-Palatinate
- Coordinates: 49°37′N 7°20′E
- Country: Germany
- State: Rhineland-Palatinate
- District: Birkenfeld
- Seat: Baumholder
- Subdivisions: 14 municipalities

Area
  - Total: 137.05 km^{2} (52.92 sq mi)

Population (2025-12-31)
  - Total: 9,525
  - Density: 69.50/km^{2} (180.0/sq mi)
- Time zone: UTC+01:00 (CET)
  - Summer (DST): UTC+02:00 (CEST)
- Website: www.vgv-baumholder.de

Baumholder is a Verbandsgemeinde ("collective municipality") in the district of Birkenfeld, in Rhineland-Palatinate, Germany. The seat of the Verbandsgemeinde is in Baumholder.

The Verbandsgemeinde Baumholder consists of the following Ortsgemeinden ("local municipalities"):

1. Baumholder
2. Berglangenbach
3. Berschweiler bei Baumholder
4. Eckersweiler
5. Fohren-Linden
6. Frauenberg
7. Hahnweiler
8. Heimbach
9. Leitzweiler
10. Mettweiler
11. Reichenbach
12. Rohrbach
13. Rückweiler
14. Ruschberg
