= Baumholder Army Airfield =

Military airfield in Baumholder, Germany

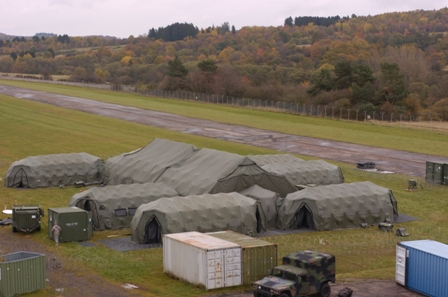
- IATA: none; ICAO: ETEK

Summary
- Airport type: Military
- Operator: United States Army
- Location: Baumholder
- Elevation AMSL: 1,421 ft / 433 m
- Coordinates: 49°39′05″N 007°18′19″E
- Interactive map of Baumholder Army Airfield

Runways
Direction	Length		Surface
Direction	m	ft	Surface
07/25	572	1,877	Asphalt

Baumholder Army Airfield is a small military airfield in support of the United States Army facilities in Baumholder, Germany. It has a single runway in the 07/25 direction which is 16 metres (52 ft) wide and 572 metres (1,877 ft) long. It is located just north-east of the town of Reichenbach.
