= Leitzweiler =

- Municipality
- Coat of arms

- Location of Leitzweiler within Birkenfeld district
- Interactive map of Leitzweiler
- Location within Germany Location within Rhineland-Palatinate
- Coordinates: 49°35′28″N 07°13′20″E
- Country: Germany
- State: Rhineland-Palatinate
- District: Birkenfeld
- Municipal assoc.: Baumholder

Government
  - Mayor (2019–24): Andreas Theodor Werle

Area
  - Total: 3.02 km^{2} (1.17 sq mi)
- Elevation: 485 m (1,591 ft)

Population (2025-12-31)
  - Total: 110
  - Density: 36/km^{2} (94/sq mi)
- Time zone: UTC+01:00 (CET)
  - Summer (DST): UTC+02:00 (CEST)
- Postal codes: 55779
- Dialling codes: 06789
- Vehicle registration: BIR
- Website: www.leitzweiler.de

Leitzweiler (German pronunciation: [ˈlaɪtsvaɪlɐ]) is an Ortsgemeinde – a municipality belonging to a Verbandsgemeinde, a kind of collective municipality – in the Birkenfeld district in Rhineland-Palatinate, Germany. It belongs to the Verbandsgemeinde of Baumholder, whose seat is in the like-named town.

== Geography ==
=== Location ===
Leitzweiler lies near the state boundary with the Saarland, roughly 3 km southeast of Hoppstädten-Weiersbach and 9 km west of Baumholder. The municipal area measures 3.02 km^{2}, of which 30% is wooded.

=== Constituent communities ===
Also belonging to Leitzweiler is the outlying homestead of Lindenhof.

== Municipality’s name ==
Leitzweiler was founded in the 8th or 9th century by nobility. At that time, all the places ending in —weiler were founded as a result of the growth in population. In Leitzweiler's case, the leading syllable would give a clue as to the founder's name. It was likely Leudoin, for this was a very common name in the Early Middle Ages.

== History ==
In 1440, Leitzweiler belonged to the County of Veldenz, and the Counts of Dhaun held it as a fief. This time is recalled in Leitzweiler's civic coat of arms; the lion in the upper half of the escutcheon is drawn from the arms formerly borne by the Counts of Veldenz. Leitzweiler – older forms of the name were Leideßweiler, Leydesweiler or Laitzweiler – was certainly very small at this time, not so much a village as a farm, and with few inhabitants. In 1444, the tiny centre passed by inheritance to Stephen, Count Palatine of Simmern-Zweibrücken (later passing to his second son Louis I, Count Palatine of Zweibrücken), and was assigned to the Oberamt of Lichtenberg. In 1533, the Lords of Oberstein were enfeoffed with Leitzweiler, along with Mettweiler, Fohren and Linden. A 1539 agreement between the Oberamt of Lichtenberg and the Lords of Oberstein set forth clearly that authority in civil, personal and practical matters lay with the Duchy of Palatinate-Zweibrücken. The Lordship of Oberstein, however, did not hold with the arrangement very long, for it was out of force by 1559, and thereafter Leitzweiler was a fief held by the Lordship of Wertenstein. At first, the Lordship comprised Leitzweiler, Heimbach, Weiersbach, Namborn, Ellweiler and Bleiderdingen. Near the last-named place stood the Wertensteiner Schloss, the Lordship's seat. In 1570, Leitzweiler burnt down utterly, although by 1587, Laitsweiler der Hof (Hof means “farm” in German) once again boasted four houses.

In 1620, a new agreement between Palatinate-Zweibrücken and Wertenstein came into force. This one set forth that authority in civil, personal and practical matters lay with the Lordship of Wertenstein, but high jurisdiction was reserved to Palatinate-Zweibrücken. Among other things dealt with in the agreement was the question of appearances at the weekly market in Baumholder by the villagers of Leitzweiler. These were compulsory, and failure to show up there on market day was punished, even if the villagers were bound to do compulsory labour in Wertenstein that same day. The new agreement rectified this, and after it came into force, failure to appear at Baumholder Market was no longer punishable, as long as a Wertenstein official could show a certificate indicating that there was compulsory labour to be done that day.

The Thirty Years' War (1618–1648) brought plundering, devastation and destruction to Leitzweiler and its surrounding area. In their wake came hunger and sickness and the resulting unending decimation of the population. In 1635, Leitzweiler and Heimbach burnt down utterly. According to one account, people from Leitzweiler fled to Castle Birkenfeld. It was 1664 before there were once again inhabitants in either Leitzweiler or Heimbach – two each. The man in Leitzweiler, according to an oft-told story, was not even German, but rather a French soldier named Werle, and indeed, the first families listed in the Hoppstädten-Weiersbach Family Book with the surname Werle were all in Leitzweiler. Since then, the name has spread, so that there is now hardly a village in the local area in which the name Werle is not amply represented.

The new village that sprang up after the Thirty Years' War was built on Leitzweiler's current site, but the village had thereby shifted its location somewhat from where the old one had been. It is believed that the old Leitzweiler lay some 100 or 200 m nearer Heimbach.

In 1667, Lorraine finally managed to gain control over the Lordship of Wertenstein, thus ending the centuries-long squabbles with Oberstein or Palatinate-Zweibrücken. Under Lorraine, Leitzweiler was grouped into the Upper Amt of Schaumburg.

The last Lord of Castle Wertenstein died in 1745. In the years that followed (1748 to 1754), his offspring sold the lordship to Tholey Abbey, which thus acquired the tithing rights. Moreover, the Abbey exercised low jurisdiction, while high jurisdiction, as had been so before, lay with the Duke of Lorraine. Appeals, therefore, had to be heard in Lorraine's capital, Nancy. In 1766, the last Duke of Lorraine died, and France came into the Duke's inheritance. Only a few years later, though, the Duke of Zweibrücken brokered a deal with France whereby Zweibrücken traded certain places in Alsace for the villages of Freisen, Heimbach, Weiersbach, Bleiderdingen and Leitzweiler. The Duke thereby managed to fill some of the territorial gaps in his holdings in 1783. In November 1792, three years after the French Revolution, French Revolutionary troops descended on the Leitzweiler area. The French burnt Leitzweiler down, but this might have been a case of “mistaken identity”. It seems that the French soldiers were to have burnt Eitzweiler, another village a few kilometres away, today a constituent community of Freisen in the Saarland. To offset Leitzweiler's loss, Eitzweiler was ordered to deliver to Leitzweiler oakwood so that the mistakenly burnt village could rise from its ashes. This, however, was not what Leitzweiler got. Instead, the wood delivered to the village was ash, which was not as popular as oak, for house borers found it quite appetizing. With the Treaty of Campo Formio in October 1797, the Rhine’s left bank was ceded to France. All lordly holdings were seized by the state and French law was imposed. Leitzweiler was part of the Department of Sarre and in the canton of Birkenfeld.

The French campaign went further, putting an end to the thousand-year-old Holy Roman Empire in 1806. It was only in 1813 that Napoleon actually suffered a decisive defeat in the Battle of Leipzig (“the Battle of the Nations”), which sent the French army fleeing to Paris, with the Prussians right behind them all the way. The Rhine's left bank was thus freed of French rule, and by a treaty concluded in May 1814, it was placed under a joint Imperial-Royal Austrian and Royal Bavarian “State Administrative Commission” (Landesverwaltungskommission). Leitzweiler lay in the Birkenfeld district in the canton of Baumholder in the Amtsbezirk of Berschweiler.

Representatives from Europe's powers gathered in 1814 and 1815 at the Congress of Vienna to decide the Continent's political shape in the post-Napoleonic era. In April 1815, great parts of the now leaderless lands out of which the French had been driven passed to Prussia. The newly formed cantons of Sankt Wendel, Grumbach and Baumholder – within which lay Leitzweiler – were, however, given by the concluding act of the Congress to the Duchy of Saxe-Coburg-Saalfeld as compensation for having helped the allies in the Napoleonic Wars.

In September 1816, Saxe-Coburg took charge of its new territory with its 25,000 souls and area of 8.25 square miles. Beginning in 1819, this territory, which went by the name Principality of Lichtenberg, had its seat of government in Sankt Wendel. Meanwhile, Weiersbach, which lay (and still lies) to Leitzweiler's north, was, along with great parts of today's Birkenfeld district, assigned to the Principality of Birkenfeld, an exclave of the Grand Duchy of Oldenburg, most of whose territory was in what is now northwest Germany, with a coastline on the North Sea. Leitzweiler thereby became a border village between these two principalities.

In 1832, the Hambach Festival was held, attended by 20,000 people who demonstrated for freedom, democracy, and national unity. At the same time, riots broke out in Sankt Wendel, leading the Duke to decide to sell the Principality of Lichtenberg to Prussia. The agreed price was 2,100,000 Thaler, and thus, in 1834, Leitzweiler remained a border village, but now in Prussian territory, while the Weiersbach side was, as it had been before, the Principality of Birkenfeld in the Grand Duchy of Oldenburg. Prussia grouped the new acquisition as the Sankt Wendel district into the Regierungsbezirk of Trier. Even today, an old border stone stands as a reminder of this time. The great stone bears the letters “KP” (for Königreich Preußen – “Kingdom of Prussia”) on the Leitzweiler side, and “GO” (for Großherzogtum Oldenburg – “Grand Duchy of Oldenburg”) on the Weiersbach side.

As a result of Germany's defeat in the First World War and the subsequent 1919 Treaty of Versailles, the Sankt Wendel district was split: 26 of the 94 municipalities within it were grouped into the Saar, a League of Nations mandate. Leitzweiler was excluded from this cession – by a couple of kilometres – and thenceforth formed along with the other 67 excluded municipalities the “Restkreis St. Wendel-Baumholder”, with the first syllable of Restkreis having the same meaning as in English, in the sense of “left over”. The “leftover” district's seat was in Baumholder.

Oldenburg and Prussia still existed in one form or another right through Imperial and Weimar times, but the Third Reich put an end to the former in 1937 by merging it with the latter. Together with the Restkreis, a new Prussian Birkenfeld district was established, to which Leitzweiler belongs to this day.

Prussia itself was abolished as any kind of political entity after the Second World War with the onset of Allied occupation. Since 1946, Leitzweiler has been part of the then newly founded state of Rhineland-Palatinate.

Ecclesiastically, Leitzweiler was long part of the Catholic parish of Bleiderdingen. Until 1932, Leitzweiler's dead were even buried in Bleiderdingen. Only then did Leitzweiler get its own graveyard. In 1947, the municipality was transferred from the parish of Bleiderdingen to the parish of Rückweiler. The inhabitants undertook a campaign to collect signatures, but to no avail. Many villagers registered their protest by attending church in Bleiderdingen; some even went to Heimbach.

=== Population development ===
The following table shows Leitzweiler's population figures for selected dates since 1609:

Year	Population
1609	37
1623	28
1635–1663	0
1664	2
1816	93
1819	105
1843	111
1861	118
1871	153
1895	130
1926	153
1950	180
1958	174
1961	166
1978	132
1990	110
1992	124
2004	130
present	≈115

== Politics ==
=== Municipal council ===
The council is made up of 6 council members, who were elected by majority vote at the municipal election held on 7 June 2009, and the honorary mayor as chairman.

=== Mayor ===
Leitzweiler's mayor is Andreas Theodor Werle.

=== Coat of arms ===
The German blazon reads: In geteiltem Schild oben in Silber ein blauer, rotgezungter und -bewehrter wachsender Löwe, unten in Blau eine goldene, aufrechtstehende Roggengarbe.

The municipality's arms might in English heraldic language be described thus: Per fess argent a demilion azure armed and langued gules, and azure a garb of rye Or.

The lion is a reference to the village's former allegiance to the County of Veldenz. The ryesheaf (“garb of rye”) symbolizes the village's former agricultural character. It may be worth noting, though, that nowadays there is not even one farmer in Leitzweiler.

== Economy and infrastructure ==
=== Transport ===
==== Road ====
Leitzweiler can be reached on the Autobahn A 62 (Kaiserslautern–Trier) through either the Freisen or the Birkenfeld interchange.

==== Rail ====
The nearest railway station is Heimbach, where almost all trains that call are Regionalbahn services. Regular rail connections, however, are available at Hoppstädten-Weiersbach in the outlying centre of Neubrücke.

==== Air ====
Frankfurt-Hahn Airport is roughly an hour's drive away. The next nearest airport is Saarbrücken Airport.
