= Berschweiler bei Baumholder =

- Municipality
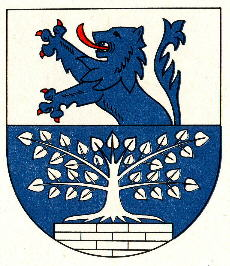
- Coat of arms

- Location of Berschweiler bei Baumholder within Birkenfeld district
- Interactive map of Berschweiler bei Baumholder
- Location within Germany Location within Rhineland-Palatinate
- Coordinates: 49°34′41″N 7°17′33″E
- Country: Germany
- State: Rhineland-Palatinate
- District: Birkenfeld
- Municipal assoc.: Baumholder

Government
  - Mayor (2019–24): Rouven Hebel

Area
  - Total: 6.66 km^{2} (2.57 sq mi)
- Elevation: 435 m (1,427 ft)

Population (2025-12-31)
  - Total: 537
  - Density: 80.6/km^{2} (209/sq mi)
- Time zone: UTC+01:00 (CET)
  - Summer (DST): UTC+02:00 (CEST)
- Postal codes: 55777
- Dialling codes: 06783
- Vehicle registration: BIR

Berschweiler bei Baumholder (German pronunciation: [ˈbɛʁʃvaɪlɐ baɪ ˌbaʊmˈhɔldɐ], lit. 'Berschweiler near Baumholder') is an Ortsgemeinde – a municipality belonging to a Verbandsgemeinde, a kind of collective municipality – in the Birkenfeld district in Rhineland-Palatinate, Germany. It belongs to the Verbandsgemeinde of Baumholder, whose seat is in the like-named town. Berschweiler bei Baumholder is one of two municipalities in the district with the name Berschweiler. The two are distinguished from each other by their geographical “tags”; the other one is called Berschweiler bei Kirn.

== Geography ==
=== Location ===
Berschweiler lies in the Westrich, an historic region that encompasses areas in both Germany and France. It is roughly 5 km southwest of Baumholder and 11 km southeast of Birkenfeld.

=== Neighbouring municipalities ===
Clockwise from the north, these are Fohren-Linden to the north, Mettweiler to the east, Eckersweiler to the south and Rohrbach to the west.

=== Constituent communities ===
Also belonging to Berschweiler are the outlying homesteads of Im Hahn, Hof Am Forst and Zollhaus.

== Politics ==
=== Municipal council ===
The council is made up of 12 council members, who were elected by majority vote at the municipal election held on 7 June 2009, and the honorary mayor as chairman.

=== Mayor ===
Berschweiler’s mayor is Rouven Hebel.

=== Coat of arms ===
The municipality’s arms might be described thus: Per fess argent a demilion azure armed and langued gules, and azure on a wall issuant from base masoned sable a limetree eradicated, all of the first.

The blue lion is a reference to the village’s former allegiance to the County of Veldenz.

== Culture and sightseeing ==
=== Buildings ===
The following are listed buildings or sites in Rhineland-Palatinate’s Directory of Cultural Monuments:

- Evangelical parish church, Hauptstraße 9 – aisleless church 1743, west tower 1863/1864; two bells, 14th century and 1499 by Master Jörg zu Spier
- Beside Am Kirchpfad 1 – cellar and storehouse, building with saddle roof with two parallel barrel vaults, possibly from as long ago as the 18th century
- Hauptstraße 34 – former rectory; many-winged Late Historicist solid building, 1901
- Hauptstraße 40 – former mayor’s residence; villalike historicized plastered building, 1905
- Hauptstraße 24, 30, 40, 44 (monumental zone) – Late Historicist villalike houses, early 20th century, bearing witness to the village centre’s former character

=== Clubs ===
Besides the gymnastic and sport club (which has a team partnership with FC Westrich Mettweiler, as SG Unnertal) and the volunteer fire brigade, there is also a shooting club that can already boast of some successes at the national level. Many other clubs offer the opportunity to get involved with other inhabitants.

== Economy and infrastructure ==
=== Transport ===
Due to its location on the Autobahn feeder road to the A 62 (Kaiserslautern–Trier), the village is connected to multiple key transport links. The towns of Kaiserslautern, Trier, and Saarbrücken can all be reached within one hour.

=== Education ===
Besides the primary school, Berschweiler also has a kindergarten. Both are found right at the sport facilities, making it possible for the classes to use the football pitch and the multipurpose hall.

=== Other public institutions ===
Likewise standing near the sport facilities is a village community centre, which also houses the local reserve fire brigade (which can be called to support other fire brigades in the area). Also, there are an Evangelical parish house and a savings bank branch.

=== Sport and leisure ===
The municipality has at its disposal two football pitches, a cinder lot on the Bornberg somewhat outside the village and a grass playing field in the outlying centre of Berggrube.

Also available is a multipurpose hall with a small-calibre shooting range.

=== Gastronomy ===
In the old village centre at the marketplace is found the Haus Albert, which offers both a restaurant and overnight accommodation.
