= Heimbach (Nahe) =

- Municipality
- Coat of arms

- Location of Heimbach within Birkenfeld district
- Interactive map of Heimbach
- Location within Germany Location within Rhineland-Palatinate
- Coordinates: 49°36′57″N 7°15′9″E
- Country: Germany
- State: Rhineland-Palatinate
- District: Birkenfeld
- Municipal assoc.: Baumholder

Government
  - Mayor (2019–24): Jürgen Saar

Area
  - Total: 6.78 km^{2} (2.62 sq mi)
- Elevation: 330 m (1,080 ft)

Population (2025-12-31)
  - Total: 1,027
  - Density: 151/km^{2} (392/sq mi)
- Time zone: UTC+01:00 (CET)
  - Summer (DST): UTC+02:00 (CEST)
- Postal codes: 55779
- Dialling codes: 06789
- Vehicle registration: BIR

Heimbach (German pronunciation: [ˈhaɪmbax]) is an Ortsgemeinde – a municipality belonging to a Verbandsgemeinde, a kind of collective municipality – in the Birkenfeld district in Rhineland-Palatinate, Germany. It belongs to the Verbandsgemeinde of Baumholder, whose seat is in the like-named town.

== Geography ==
=== Location ===
The municipality lies in the Westrich, an historic region that encompasses areas in both Germany and France, on the like-named brook, the Heimbach, in the Nahe valley between the towns of Idar-Oberstein, Baumholder and the district seat, Birkenfeld. Heimbach is at the western edge of the Verbandsgemeinde of Baumholder.

=== Neighbouring municipalities ===
Heimbach borders in the north on the municipalities of Nohen and Reichenbach, in the east on the municipality of Ruschberg, in the south on the municipalities of Berglangenbach and Leitzweiler and in the west on the municipality of Hoppstädten-Weiersbach.

=== Constituent communities ===
Also belonging to Heimbach are the outlying homesteads of Altwieserhof, Bahnhof Heimbach (Nahe), Gladerbacherhof, Heimbacherhof and Steibericherhof.

== History ==
In 1268, Heymbach had its first documentary mention. It had been previously thought to be one from 1494. For centuries, Heimbach belonged to Lorraine. In 1783 Heimbach was sold to Palatinate-Zweibrücken by the Saxe-Coburg government. It was ruled by the French from 1798 to 1814. During this time it was in the Department of Sarre. After the Napoleonic Wars, it became part of the Principality of Lichtenburg, which belonged to Saxe-Coburg-Saalfeld (1814–1825), Saxe-Coburg-Gotha (1825–1834), and Prussia (1834–1871). Under Prussian rule, it was part of the District of Sankt Wendel. After German Unification in 1871, it remained part of Prussia until the Second World War. After the war, it was part of the District of Baumholder until 1970 when it became part of the District of Birkenfeld.

=== Population development ===
Year	Population
1871	679
1905	794
1939	1332
1950	1427
1961	1645
1970	1773
1981	1401
1985	1437
1990	1434
1995	1394
2000	1351
2005	1270
2009	1234

== Politics ==
=== Municipal council ===
The council is made up of 16 council members, who were elected by proportional representation at the municipal election held on 25 May 2014, and the honorary mayor as chairman.

The municipal election held on 25 May 2014 yielded the following results:

Year	SPD	CDU	FWG	Total
2014	–	6	10	16 seats
2009	3	7	6	16 seats
2004	3	6	7	16 seats

=== Mayor ===
Heimbach’s mayor is Jürgen Saar (FWG).

=== Coat of arms ===
The German blazon reads: Oberer Teil der Schildhälfte: Auf schwarzem Grunde befindet sich ein rotbewehrter gezungter und gekrönter wachsender (halber) goldener Löwe. – Unterer Teil der Schildhälfte: Auf grünem Grunde befindet sich ein dreigeteilter silberner Wellenbalken. Darüber ein silbernes Zweibalken- oder Deichselkreuz.

The municipality’s arms might in English heraldic language be described thus: Per fess sable issuant from the line of partition a demilion Or armed, langued and crowned gules and vert a pall reversed wavy above which the Cross of Lorraine, both argent.

The lion refers to the parts of the municipal area once held by the Counts of Palatine Zweibrücken. The cross with two crossbars recalls the time when the Duchy of Lorraine held sway in Heimbach. The “pall reversed” (that is, upside-down Y shape) symbolizes the coming together of the Reichenbach and the Unnerbach to form the Heimbach.

== Culture and sightseeing ==
=== Buildings ===
The following are listed buildings or sites in Rhineland-Palatinate’s Directory of Cultural Monuments:

- Hauptstraße – two single-arch sandstone-block bridges built at right angles onto each other (Heimbach-Brücke and Unnerbach-Brücke)
- Bridge, west of the village at Heimbach (Nahe) railway station – three-arch sandstone-block bridge across the Nahe, before 1860

In the Catholic church, Way of the Cross paintings by Gottwald have been uncovered. The Catholic church belongs to the parochial community of Baumholder, Hoppstädten-Weiersbach, Heimbach and Rückweiler.

== Economy and infrastructure ==
=== Transport ===
==== Road ====
To the south runs the Autobahn A 62 (Kaiserslautern–Trier). The nearest interchanges are Birkenfeld (Exit 4, 7 km to the west) and Freisen (Exit 5, 10 km to the east). Bundesstraße 41 runs to the northwest of Heimbach and there is access at Idar-Oberstein and near Birkenfeld.

The following highways run through Heimbach:

- Landesstraße (State Road) 169 (Hauptstraße)
  - East to Ruschberg and Baumholder
  - West to Hoppstädten-Weiersbach
- Landesstraße 347 (Unnerstraße)
  - Southeast to Fohren-Linden
- Kreisstraße (District Road) 60 (Am Lindenhübel and In der Ihlsbach)
  - Southwest to Leitzweiler

==== Rail ====
Heimbach (Nahe) station

At the railway station in Heimbach itself, there were no passenger service between 1981 and 2014. For that, the station Heimbach (Nahe), lying 2 km west of the main centre on the river Nahe, on the Nahe Valley Railway (Bingen–Saarbrücken), which was built through this region in 1859, was used. However, the Heimbach (Nahe)–Baumholder was reactivated on 14 December 2014. This spur is 9 km long and enters the village at the Scheidwald Tunnel. It was built in 1912.

=== Education ===
In Heimbach, one kindergarten is to be found. Until 1971, there were a Catholic Volksschule and an Evangelical school at both of which the ninth-class Hauptschulabschluss could be earned. The Catholic Volksschule was then converted into a non-denominational primary school and the Evangelical school was dropped altogether. Beginning with the fifth class, the village’s children must go to school in Baumholder or Birkenfeld, or less often Freisen.

== Famous people ==
- Otto Witte (16 October 1872 – 13 August 1958) was once a resident of Heimbach. When Albania gained its independence from the Ottoman Empire, Witte claimed to have passed himself off as the "King of Albania" for five days and that he had actually been crowned.
