= Johannes Lichtenberger =

German astrologer

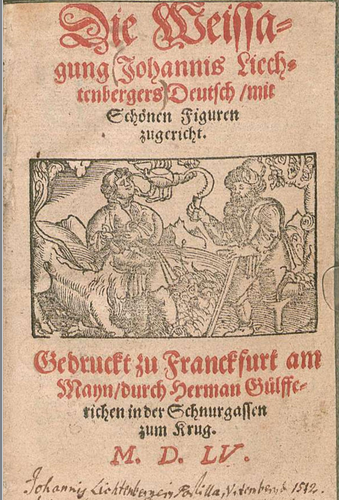
Book by Lichtenberger, published 1555 with the title "Die Weissagungen" translates into "The Prophecies". The book includes pictures, as enhancement

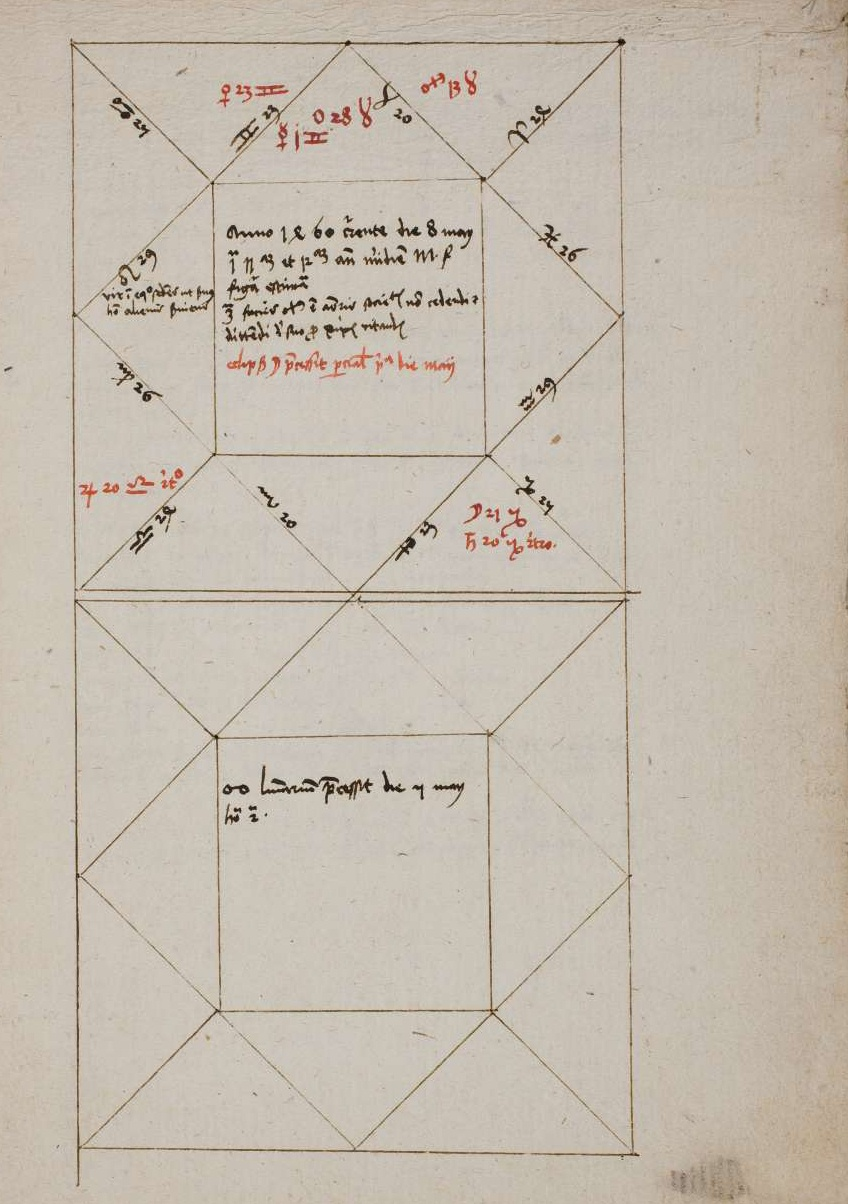
Manuscript from Lichtenberger's own hand

Johannes Lichtenberger (died 1503) was a noted German astrologer.

He appears to have been, briefly in the early 1470s, court astrologer to the Emperor Frederick III.

His 1488 Prognosticatio in latino, published at Heidelberg, was well known and appeared in numerous subsequent editions and translations.

== Publications ==
- W. Harry Rylands (editor) (1890) Prognosticatio in Latino by John Lichtenberg (reproduction of 1488 edition)
