= Fohren-Linden =

- Municipality
- Coat of arms

- Location of Fohren-Linden within Birkenfeld district
- Interactive map of Fohren-Linden
- Location within Germany Location within Rhineland-Palatinate
- Coordinates: 49°35′N 7°17′E
- Country: Germany
- State: Rhineland-Palatinate
- District: Birkenfeld
- Municipal assoc.: Baumholder

Government
  - Mayor (2019–24): Michael Reis

Area
  - Total: 6.60 km^{2} (2.55 sq mi)
- Elevation: 400 m (1,300 ft)

Population (2025-12-31)
  - Total: 307
  - Density: 46.5/km^{2} (120/sq mi)
- Time zone: UTC+01:00 (CET)
  - Summer (DST): UTC+02:00 (CEST)
- Postal codes: 55777
- Dialling codes: 06783
- Vehicle registration: BIR
- Website: www.fohren-linden.de

Fohren-Linden is an Ortsgemeinde – a municipality belonging to a Verbandsgemeinde, a kind of collective municipality – in the Birkenfeld district in Rhineland-Palatinate, Germany. It belongs to the Verbandsgemeinde of Baumholder, whose seat is in the like-named town.

== Geography ==
=== Location ===
The municipality lies in the southern Hunsrück in the Unnertal (Unnerbach valley) in the west of Rhineland-Palatinate near the state boundary with the Saarland.

=== Constituent communities ===
Also belonging to Fohren-Linden is the outlying homestead of Finkenmühle.

== History ==
The municipality's name comes from two trees: the word Fohren is apparently a variant of the German word Föhre (“pine”, but cognate with the English word “fir”), while the second word, Linden, is also used in English, alongside “lime” and “basswood”, for the tree of the genus Tilia that still characterizes the village today. It may be, though, that the first half of this hyphenated name comes from the archaic word Forrn (in modern German, Forelle – “trout”). It is known from historical documents that the local stream, the Unnerbach, once teemed with fish.

What is certain, however, is the village's first documentary mention, which has been dated to 960.

In the First World War, ten men from Fohren-Linden gave their lives. They were followed by 19 others in the Second World War.

== Politics ==
=== Municipal council ===
The council is made up of 8 council members, who were elected by majority vote at the municipal election held on 7 June 2009, and the honorary mayor as chairman.

=== Mayor ===
Fohren-Linden's mayor is Michael Reis.

=== Coat of arms ===
The German blazon reads: In Silber eine schwarze Krücke, oben ein rotbewehrter und -gezungter wachsender blauer Löwe, unten vorne ein Föhrenzweig, hinten ein grünes Lindenblatt.

The municipality's arms might in English heraldic language be described thus: Argent a bar and in base a vergette couped at the bar sable, issuant from the bar a demilion azure armed and langued gules, in dexter base a pine twig slipped bendwise proper and in sinister base a lime leaf slipped vert.

The lion is a reference to the village's former allegiance to the Counts of Veldenz in the Middle Ages. The two charges in base are canting for the municipality's name. As explained above, the two parts of the name are likely derived from the names of the two trees that these charges represent.

The arms have been borne since 15 March 1963.

== Culture and sightseeing ==
=== Buildings ===
The following are listed buildings or sites in Rhineland-Palatinate’s Directory of Cultural Monuments:

- north of the village on the slope of the Berg Platt (mountain) – warriors’ memorial 1914–1918; stelelike sandstone block, relief of a warrior, after 1918 (1922, according to the municipality's website)
- northwest of the village – so-called Hoffmannsmühle (mill); L-shaped building, marked 1868, dwelling portion Late Classicist

== Economy and infrastructure ==
=== Transport ===
The Autobahn A 62 can be reached through an interchange in Freisen, five kilometres away.
