= Baumholder =

- Town
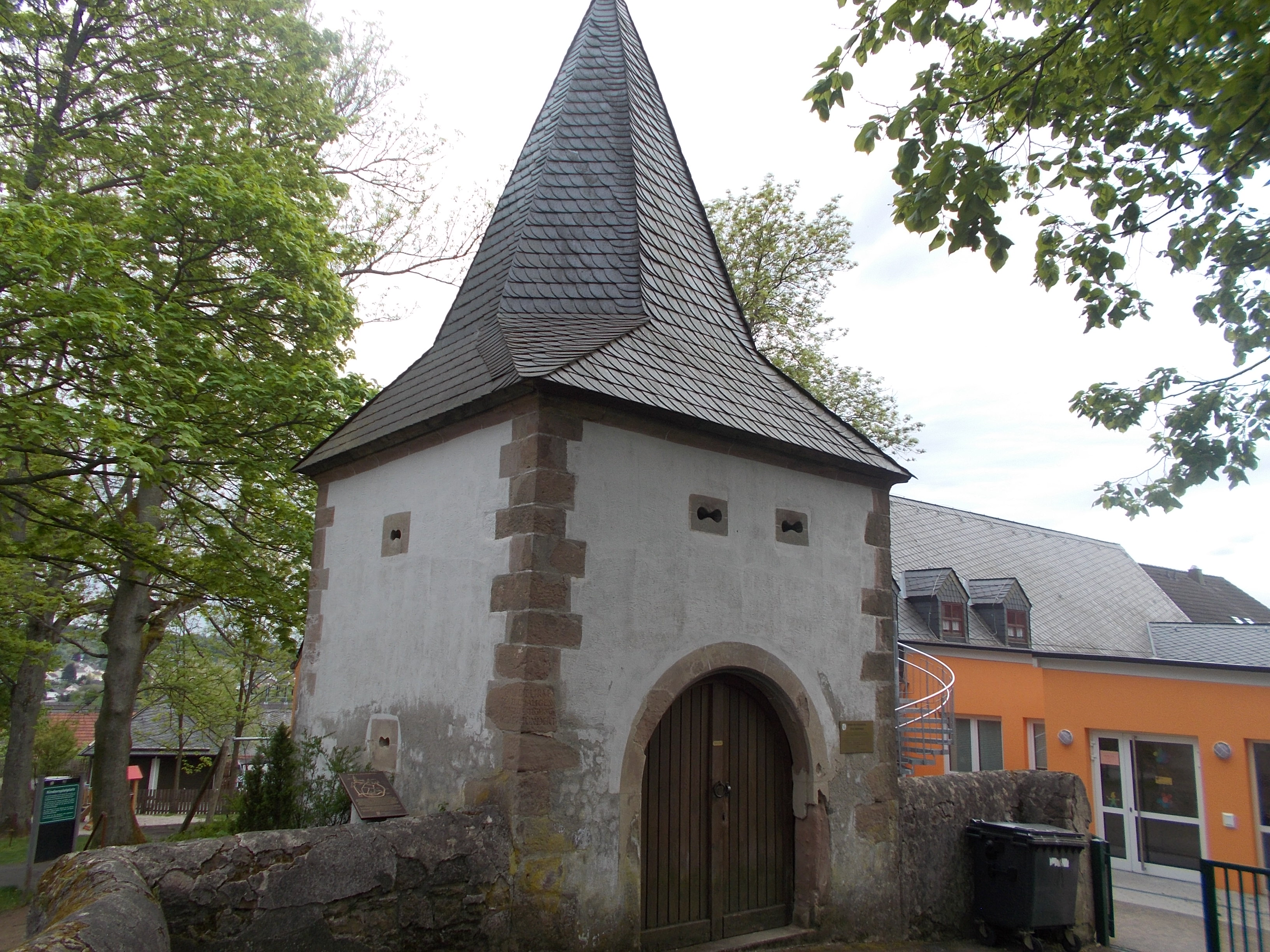
- Corpse Gate Tower

- Coat of arms

- Location of Baumholder within Birkenfeld district
- Interactive map of Baumholder
- Location within Germany Location within Rhineland-Palatinate
- Coordinates: 49°36′45″N 7°20′05″E
- Country: Germany
- State: Rhineland-Palatinate
- District: Birkenfeld

Government
  - Mayor (2024–29): Günther Jung

Area
  - Total: 69.19 km^{2} (26.71 sq mi)
- Elevation: 420–540 m (1,380–1,770 ft)

Population (2025-12-31)
  - Total: 4,294
  - Density: 62.06/km^{2} (160.7/sq mi)
- Time zone: UTC+01:00 (CET)
  - Summer (DST): UTC+02:00 (CEST)
- Postal codes: 55774
- Dialling codes: 06783
- Vehicle registration: BIR
- Website: www.baumholder.de

Baumholder (German pronunciation: [baʊmˈhɔldɐ]) is a town in the Birkenfeld district in Rhineland-Palatinate, Germany, in the Westrich, an historic region that encompasses areas in both Germany and France. The town of Baumholder is the administrative seat of the like-named Verbandsgemeinde, a state-recognised tourism resort and, according to state planning, a middle centre.

== Geography ==
=== Location ===
Baumholder lies between the Hunsrück to the north and the North Palatine Uplands to the south, right on a height that marks the latter's northern boundary. This area is also known as the Westrich. Baumholder lies roughly 10 km south of Idar-Oberstein.

The countryside around Baumholder is marked by many meadows, fields and woodlands, both broadleaf and mixed. A great part of the Baumholder Troop Drilling Ground abutting the town serves as a refuge for many plant and animal species that have become rare, for example the common kingfisher, the lynx and the badger, some of which are on the IUCN Red List.

=== Climate ===
Precipitation diagram

Yearly precipitation in Baumholder amounts to 884 mm. At 76% of the German Weather Service's weather stations, lower figures are recorded. The driest month is April. The most rainfall comes in December. In that month, precipitation is twice what it is in April. Precipitation varies only slightly. At 46% of the weather stations, lower seasonal swings are recorded.

== History ==
=== Middle Ages to 19th century ===
In 1156, Baumholder had its first documentary mention as Bemondula, then held by the Bishop of Verdun. By the 14th century, it had ended up under the Counts of Veldenz, until 1444, when it was acquired by Stephen, Count Palatine of Simmern-Zweibrücken. Until the French Revolution, Baumholder was the seat of a Zweibrücken Schultheißerei. In 1490, Alexander, Count Palatine of Zweibrücken gave Baumholder leave to fortify the market town.

Although town rights were never explicitly granted Baumholder, the town acquired a number of privileges over the ages that have more or less amounted to as much.

From 1816, Baumholder, along with the rest of the Principality of Lichtenberg, belonged as an exclave to Saxe-Coburg-Saalfeld. The Principality was sold in 1834 to Prussia and came to form the geographical centre of the Sankt Wendel district, whose bounds to this day define most of the bounds of the Evangelical church district of Sankt Wendel.

=== 20th century ===
With the formation of the Territory of the Saar Basin in 1919, Baumholder was split from the district seat of Sankt Wendel by the newly drawn border and thereafter became the seat of the Restkreis (roughly "remnant district") of St. Wendel-Baumholder. Its designation as a Restkreis arose from its being what was left of the Sankt Wendel district on the Prussian side of the border once the Territory of the Saar Basin had been formed under the terms of the Treaty of Versailles. It was run as a rural district (Landkreis), however. Once the Saar area was returned to Germany in 1935, though, the district remained separate. On 1 April 1937, the Restkreis was merged into the Birkenfeld district.

In the 20th century, Baumholder became a garrison town when the Wehrmacht built its barracks and troop drilling ground here. To do this, several thousand inhabitants were moved. Between 1941 and 1945, the troop drilling ground was the location of a prisoner-of-war camp for Soviet, Polish and other prisoners.

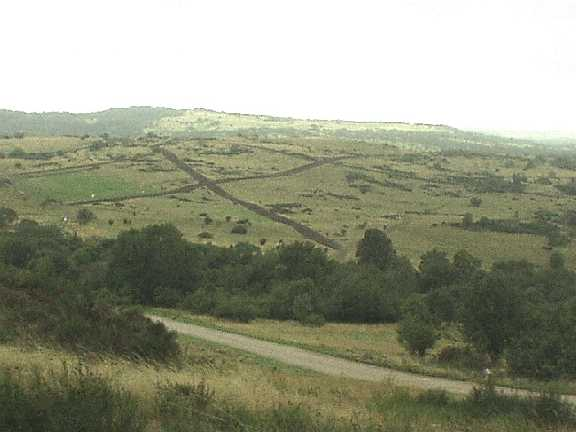
Baumholder, troop drilling ground

After the Second World War, after a short occupation by the United States Army, French soldiers were stationed in Baumholder for a few years. These left the garrison when the Americans came back.

The United States Army built the troop drilling ground beginning in 1951 into one of its biggest garrisons in Germany, which also brought Baumholder a considerable upswing in its economy in the 1950s: bars opened, as did dancehalls and music halls.

On 1 January 1994, the municipality of Gutsbezirk Baumholder (Gutsbezirk means "estate area") was amalgamated with Baumholder, although not wholly, for parts of the area were also shared out to other neighbouring municipalities in both the Birkenfeld and Kusel districts. The municipality of Zaubach had already been merged into Gutsbezirk Baumholder on 1 January 1978.

On August 10, 2005 a group of US Army soldiers engaged in a crime spree within the town of Baumholder, burgling several US Government buildings in Smith Barracks. The soldiers stole computer equipment, robbed a local German taxi driver, and ended their spree early the next morning by setting fire to the Town Hall (Rathaus).

Later that day, German law enforcement took into custody two US Army soldiers and were seeking a third for questioning. Investigators eventually questioned as many as 20 persons, both American and German nationals, for information about the crime spree. Private First Class Zachary Watson and Specialist Samuel Bell were arrested by German authorities in connection to the crimes which totalled more than €1.5 million in damage. The soldiers were handed over to US officials. Watson was sentenced to 15 years in prison at court-martial. In a separate court-martial proceeding, Bell was sentenced to seven years in prison, dishonourable discharge, demotion to private and forfeiture of all pay and allowances.

== Politics ==
=== Town council ===
The council is made up of 20 council members, who were elected by proportional representation at the municipal election held on 9 June 2024, and the honorary mayor as chairman.

The municipal election held on 9 June 2024 yielded the following results:

	SPD	CDU	FDP	FWG	LFB	Total
2024	7	–	2	6	5	20 seats
2019	6	–	2	8	4	20 seats
2014	7	2	1	5	5	20 seats
2009	8	2	2	4	4	20 seats
2004	8	6	2	4	–	20 seats

=== Mayor ===
Baumholder's mayor is Günther Jung (FWG).

=== Coat of arms ===
The German blazon reads: Das Wappen der Stadt Baumholder zeigt im silbernen Schilde einen aus grünem Dreiberg aufwachsenden grün belaubten Holder- (Holunder-) baum. Neben dem Stamm desselben erscheint an nach außen gebogenen grünen Stielen rechts und links je eine vergrößerte, naturfarbene (weiße) Blüte des Holderbaums. Auf dem Schilde ruht die dreitürmige steinfarbene Mauerkrone.

The town's arms might in English heraldic language be described thus: Argent issuant from a mount of three vert in base an elder tree leafed of the same between two elder blossoms proper, also issuant from the mount, the dexter with stem embowed to dexter and the sinister with stem embowed to sinister, the shield ensigned with a mural crown with three towers masoned and embattled proper.

The arms were designed in 1907 by the Berlin heraldic artist Prof. Hildebrandt, and go back to town seals and arms borne in the 16th and 17th centuries. The arms have been borne since 8 February 1909 when they were approved, with a signature on the watercolour original, by Wilhelm II, King of Prussia.

=== Town partnerships ===
Baumholder fosters partnerships with the following places:

- (Ardennes (department)) Warcq, Ardennes, France, since the 1960s
- Delaware, Ohio, United States, since 13 May 2011

== Culture and sightseeing ==
=== Buildings ===
The following are listed buildings or sites in Rhineland-Palatinate’s Directory of Cultural Monuments:

- Evangelical parish church, Kirchstraße 19 – Baroque aisleless church, 1748–1750, architect Friedrich Hartmann Koch, Kusel; west tower Late Gothic
- Saint Simon's and Saint Jude's Catholic Parish Church (Pfarrkirche St. Simon und Judas Thaddäus), Hinterm Turm/corner of Hinter Haselweg – Gothic Revival hall church, 1882–1885, architect P. Kontzen, Deggendorf, Bavaria; furnishings
- Town fortifications – built in the 16th century, only two towers preserved:
  - Dicker Turm ("Fat Tower" or "Thick Tower") – full-round, quarrystone, partly reconstructed
  - Leichenpförtchen ("Little Lychgate") – square gatetower, pyramidal roof
- Across from Badegasse 1 – so-called Schmiede Bier; small smithy, possibly about 1840; technical fittings
- Hauptstraße 10 – former town hall; seven-axis, three-floor Classicist building with hipped roof, 1840
- Hauptstraße 16 – Quereinhaus (a combination residential and commercial house divided for these two purposes down the middle, perpendicularly to the street), twelve-axis Quereinhaus, late 19th century
- Korngasse 1 – Gasthaus Goldener Engel (inn); three-floor plastered building, partly slated, early 20th century; characterises town's appearance
- Marktplatz – so-called Wäschbach; five-sided walled basin, essentially from the 19th century
- Guthausmühle/Edingers Mühle (mill), northeast of the town on the Guthausbach – witnessed in 1750; three-sided estate: commercial building, mill, house and since 1890 inn joined together; gristmill from the latter half of the 19th century; fittings

=== Dialect ===
The regional dialect is highly consistent with the Saarland Dialect, a Rhine Franconian dialect spoken mainly in the east of the Saarland. German speakers from other regions often mistake Baumholderers for people from the Saarland for this reason, although Baumholder speech is a relative "island dialect", for in all neighbouring centres, such as Kusel, Idar-Oberstein and Freisen, even in ones like Freisen that are actually in the Saarland, the pronunciation is noticeably different.

=== Deutschland-Rallye ===
Baumholder is a venue for the Hunsrück-Rallye and later the ADAC-Rallye Deutschland, which has every year since 2002, except 2009, been a stage in the World Rally Championship. The Altstadtfest ("Old Town Festival") held at the same time as the rally is among the region's most important events.

=== OIE Triathlon ===
Since 2005, a triathlon has been held each year in the town of Baumholder. This is open to individual or team competition.

=== Clubs ===
One of the town's best known clubs is VfR Baumholder sport club. Other less well known but important clubs include the Deutsche Lebens-Rettungs-Gesellschaft (DLRG), the Baumholderer Karnevalsgesellschaft (BKG, devoted to Carnival), the German Red Cross (DRK), the angling club and the dog sport club (HSV).

=== Other yearly events ===
- Altstadtfest ("Old Town Festival")
- Lindenfest
- Kräutermarkt ("Herb Market")
- Kirmes (kermis; church consecration festival)
- Weihnachtsmarkt ("Christmas Market")
- Rosenmontagszug ("Shrove Monday Parade")
- BKG Prunksitzungen (Councils of Elves, a Carnival event)
- DLRG Weiherfest ("Pond Festival")

== Economy and infrastructure ==
=== Economy ===
Baumholder is well known as the location of one of the biggest American garrisons in Germany, which sprang up beginning in the 1950s on the lands of the Baumholder Troop Drilling Ground (Truppenübungsplatz Baumholder), which abuts the town. Ever since that time, the 13,000 or so United States military personnel and their dependents have characterized the town's image scenically, economically and even socially.

The Americans maintain two facilities, Smith Barracks and Wetzel Barracks, in which roughly 12,000 people live. There is also Baumholder Army Airfield. The Americans run twelve of their own churches as well as cinemas, a PX and a hospital. Many of the town's shops accept United States dollars in payment and are to a great extent dependent on American currency.

To this day, the United States forces and the Bundeswehr are the biggest employers of the town's German population. On more than 35 ranges designed for infantry, tank troops and artillery, Bundeswehr soldiers can be found training alongside Americans and soldiers from other NATO countries.

The troop drilling ground is under Bundeswehr administration. Since 2002, the US Army has been gradually moving its tanks to troop drilling grounds in the Upper Palatinate that are under their own control. Some of the US troops stationed in town were regularly deployed in the Iraq War, and for the most part, returned afterwards to Baumholder.

On 9 October 2012, the 170th Infantry Brigade was inactivated ending a decades-long legacy of combat units stationed at Baumholder's Smith Barracks. While Smith Barracks has been rumoured to be facing closure for years, it has been designated an "enduring" base.

32nd AADCOM had a presence in Germany in the 1960s and 1970s. There was a Nike-Hercules missile battery in Baumholder (Battery C, 5th Battalion, 6th Air Defence Artillery). There was another (Battery D, 5th Battalion, 6th Air Defense Artillery) in nearby Hontheim. The battalion headquarters was in Baumholder. An IHAWK battery, Battery D, 2nd Battalion, 62nd Air Defense Artillery, was in Reitscheid. Battalion headquarters was at Spangdahlem Air Base. They were supplied from the Spangdahlem Air Base (Bitburg-Prüm).

Baumholder's inhabitants, however, are exclusively civilian. Agriculture today plays a role in the town's life only in a very few surrounding farms and villages. Given the small number of learned occupations available in the region, especially in Baumholder and the surrounding Verbandsgemeinde, the share of the population with academic degrees is also rather small.

=== Shift in economic structure ===
The attempt introduced in the 1990s to change the economic structure by, for instance, bringing in the recycling industry and doing seminal research at the Environmental Campus Birkenfeld in Neubrücke have thus far yielded little change in the local economy and job market.

=== Transport ===
==== Autobahn ====
Baumholder can be reached over the Autobahn A 62 (Interchange 5 – Freisen). The town of Baumholder lies some 50 km northeast of Saarbrücken, some 35 km northwest of Kaiserslautern and some 50 km southeast of Trier.

==== Railway ====
Baumholder has a railway link in the Heimbach (Nahe)–Baumholder line, a 9 km-long spur. The line was closed to passenger traffic on 31 May 1981, but remained open for military traffic. The line was reopened in 2015. Trains run hourly to and from Idar-Oberstein or Kirn, where connecting trains to Mainz, Frankfurt/Main and Saarbrücken can be reached. There is also a bus link to Idar-Oberstein and Birkenfeld (route 322, run by the Rhein-Nahe-Nahverkehrsverbund), although this is only run on weekdays, not weekends. The travel time to Neubrücke is roughly 30 minutes. Rail and bus services in the area are provided by Rhein-Nahe Nahverkehrsverbund (RNN). www.rnn.info.

The nearest railway station on a main line is in Heimbach (some 8 km away) on the Nahe Valley Railway. Since the reopening of the Baumholder service, few trains stop at this station. The closest station for express trains is at Neubrücke (some 13 km away) or in Idar-Oberstein (some 15 km away).

==== Airport ====
The nearest airport is Saarbrücken Airport. Frankfurt-Hahn Airport is about an hour's drive away. Frankfurt/Main is about 2 hours by car or rail. Saarbrücken-Ensheim is approximately 90 minutes away. Zweibrücken Airport is about 80 km away but is currently closed.

== Current US Military on Smith Barracks ==
=== 10th Army Air and Missile Defense Command ===
(Headquartered in Kaiserslautern)

==== 5th Battalion, 7th Air Defense Artillery Regiment ====
- Headquarters & Headquarters Battery
- A Battery
- B Battery
- C Battery
- D Battery
- E Company

=== 16th Sustainment Brigade ===
- Headquarters & Headquarters Company

==== 16th Special Troops Battalion ====
- Headquarters & Headquarters Company
- 504th Signal Company
- 569th Human Resources Company

=== 18th Combat Sustainment Support Battalion ===
- 240th Quartermaster Company
- 51st Transportation Company
- 515th Transportation Company

=== 95th Combat Sustainment Support Battalion ===
- 317th Support Maintenance Company
- 55th Quartermaster Company
- 42nd Transportation Company

=== 30th Medical Brigade ===
(Headquartered in Sembach)

==== 421st Medical Battalion (Multi-Functional) ====
- Headquarters & Headquarters Detachment
- 557th Medical Company (Area Support)
- 8th Medical Company (Logistics)
- 64th Veterinary Detachment
- 71st Preventive Medicine Detachment
- 254th Combat and Operational Stress Control (COSC) Detachment

=== Special Operations Command Africa (SOCAFRICA) ===
(Headquartered in Stuttgart)

- Special Operations Task Force - North and West Africa (SOTF-NWA)

== Notable people ==
Sons and daughters of the town:

- Johannes Lichtenberger (d. about 1503), famous astrologer, from the vanished village of Grünbach on the troop drilling grounds
- Erica Vandal, American military officer
- David Whitehurst (b. 1955), former American football player (Green Bay Packers and Kansas City Chiefs quarterback)

== Documentation ==
- Hansjürgen Hilgert: Ami, bleib hier – Die Baumholderstory; Deutschland, 2007 D
