= Freisen =

- Municipality
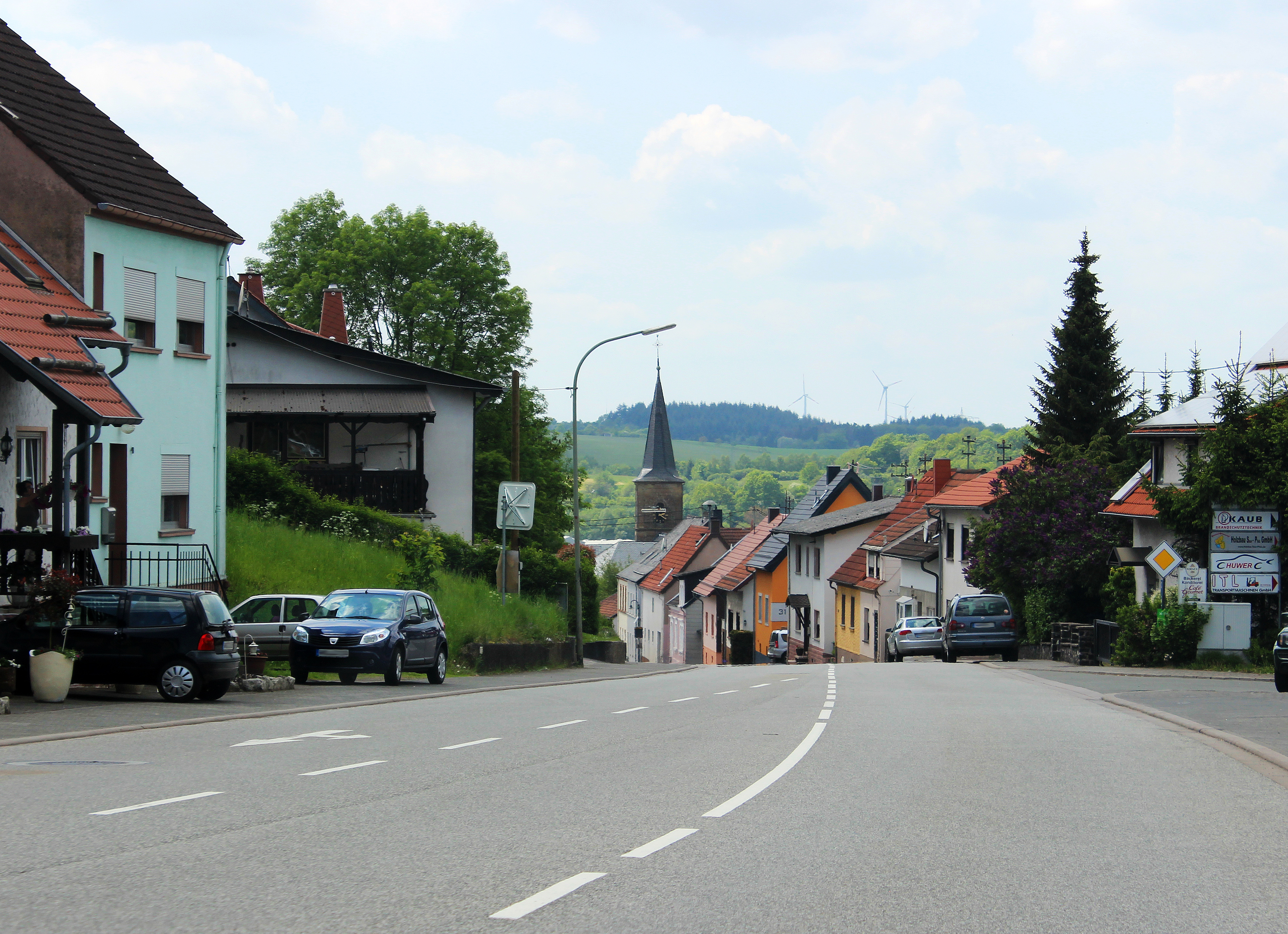

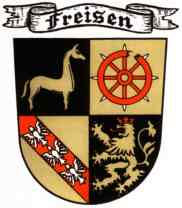
- Coat of arms

- Location of Freisen within Sankt Wendel district
- Interactive map of Freisen
- Location within Germany Location within Saarland
- Coordinates: 49°32′N 7°15′E
- Country: Germany
- State: Saarland
- District: Sankt Wendel
- Subdivisions: 8

Government
  - Mayor (2019–29): Karl-Josef Scheer (SPD)

Area
  - Total: 48.08 km^{2} (18.56 sq mi)
- Elevation: 516 m (1,693 ft)

Population (2025-12-31)
  - Total: 8,093
  - Density: 168.3/km^{2} (436.0/sq mi)
- Time zone: UTC+01:00 (CET)
  - Summer (DST): UTC+02:00 (CEST)
- Postal codes: 66626–66629
- Dialling codes: 06855
- Vehicle registration: WND
- Website: www.freisen.de

Freisen is a municipality in the district of Sankt Wendel, in Saarland, Germany. It is situated approximately 12 km northeast of Sankt Wendel, and 20 km southwest of Idar-Oberstein. The public transportation in Freisen/Oberkirchen is through bus and connects to other towns via transfers in Sankt Wendel and Neunkirchen.
