= Bundesautobahn 62 =

Federal motorway in Germany

A 62
- Bundesautobahn 62

Route information
- Length: 79 km (49 mi)

Major junctions
- North end: Bundesautobahn 1 in Nonnweiler, Saarland
- South end: Bundesautobahn 6 in Ramstein-Miesenbach, Rhineland-Palatinate

Location
- Country: Germany
- States: Rhineland-Palatinate, Saarland

Highway system
- Roads in Germany; Autobahns; List; Federal; List; State; E-roads
← A 61	→ A 63

Bundesautobahn 62 (translates from German as Federal Motorway 62, short form Autobahn 62, abbreviated as BAB 62 or A 62) is an autobahn in southwestern Germany, connecting the A 1 with the A 6. It also connects numerous communities throughout the central Hunsrück. The highway was constructed in the early or mid-1980s.

== Exit list ==
	(1)	Nonnweiler 3-way interchange A 1 E422
	(2)	Nonnweiler-Otzenhausen
		Road bridge 50 m
		Rest area Sötern
		Söterbach Viaduct 190 m
	(3)	Nohfelden-Türkismühle
		Wackenfloß Viaduct 70 m
		Kappbach Viaduct 50 m
		Nahe Viaduct 150 m
		Nahe
	(4)	Birkenfeld B 41 B 269
		Am Karlswald/Am Freisener Kreuz parking area
	(5)	Freisen
	(6)	Reichweiler
	(7)	Kusel B 420
		Umbau als: parking area
		Rest area Potzberg (planned)
		Henschbach Viaduct 390 m
		Weiherborner Garten parking area
	(8)	Glan-Münchweiler
		Am Heidenkornesch parking area
		Katzenbcher Höhe parking area
	(9)	Hütschenhausen
	(10)	Landstuhl-West 4-way interchange A 6 E50
	(-)	Landstuhl-West
		Mannheim-Saarbrücken railway 440 m
	(11)	Landstuhl-Atzel
		Tunnel Hörnchenberg Tunnel 536 m
		Kindsbach (planned)
	(12)	Bann
End of the motorway		End of the motorway
		Kaltenborngraben Viaduct
	13	Weselberg
		Sickingen Heights parking area
	13a	Höheinöd
		Schwarzbach Viaduct 600 m
	14	Thaleischweiler-Fröschen
		Autobahn
	(15)	Pirmasens B 10
Intersection		3-way interchange Pirmasens (planned) A 8
