= Oberalben =

- Municipality
- Coat of arms

- Location of Oberalben within Kusel district
- Interactive map of Oberalben
- Location within Germany Location within Rhineland-Palatinate
- Coordinates: 49°34′42.39″N 7°24′0.86″E
- Country: Germany
- State: Rhineland-Palatinate
- District: Kusel
- Municipal assoc.: Kusel-Altenglan

Government
  - Mayor (2019–24): Walter Dick

Area
  - Total: 5.63 km^{2} (2.17 sq mi)
- Elevation: 310 m (1,020 ft)

Population (2025-12-31)
  - Total: 202
  - Density: 35.9/km^{2} (92.9/sq mi)
- Time zone: UTC+01:00 (CET)
  - Summer (DST): UTC+02:00 (CEST)
- Postal codes: 66871
- Dialling codes: 06381
- Vehicle registration: KUS

Oberalben is an Ortsgemeinde – a municipality belonging to a Verbandsgemeinde, a kind of collective municipality – in the Kusel district in Rhineland-Palatinate, Germany. It belongs to the Verbandsgemeinde of Kusel-Altenglan, whose seat is in Kusel.

== Geography ==
=== Location ===
Oberalben lies beyond the heights on the Glan's left bank in a hollow over which towers the mountain massif known as the Steinerner Mann on the upper reaches of the Kuralb (also called the Kaueralb, and upstream from Oberalben, the Stegbach), which roughly 3 km farther northwards, at an elevation of 253 m above sea level empties into the Totenalb, itself a tributary to the Steinalb that empties into the Glan near Niederalben. Oberalben itself lies at an elevation of roughly 310 m above sea level about in the middle of a rather narrow municipal area stretching from north to south. A 180-hectare piece of land that even now is counted as part of Oberalben's municipal area was incorporated into the Baumholder Troop Drilling Ground when that was established by the Nazis in 1938. Indeed, the municipal area's greatest elevation is held to be the 460 m-high Steinerner Mann, now within the Baumholder Troop Drilling Ground. The outlying centre of Mayweilerhof in the municipal area's southeast stretches just under the 400 m mark in the uppermost reaches of the Blaubach, a stream that flows down into the Kuselbach. The highest elevation on the plateau west of the Mayweilerhof on the so-called Römerstraße (Roman road) lies just over the 400 m mark. Likewise reaching farther up than 400 m are a few peaks bordering the narrow Kuralb valley. The municipal area measures 563 ha, of which 108 ha is wooded.

=== Neighbouring municipalities ===
Oberalben borders in the north on the Baumholder Troop Drilling Ground, in the east on the municipality of Ulmet, in the southeast on the municipality of Erdesbach, in the south on the municipality of Blaubach, in the southwest on the municipality of Körborn and in the west on the municipality of Dennweiler-Frohnbach. Part of the Baumholder Troop Drilling Ground just to the north is the former municipal area of the now vanished village of Erzweiler in the Birkenfeld district. This is now considered nominally part of Baumholder.

=== Municipality's layout ===
The biggest part of the village of Oberalben stretches along the through road, called Hauptstraße ("Main Street") on the Kuralb's right bank parallel to the stream's course from west to east. On the way into the village, coming from the east, the former schoolhouse, now the village community centre, can be seen to the right of the road. Farther on into the village core stands the Auswanderermuseum ("Emigrants' Museum"), and farther still, stretching along the right side of the road and the brook is the sporting ground. Only a few houses still stand over on the left bank. Beyond this point, the road leads to the neighbouring village of Dennweiler-Frohnbach. In the village centre, near the Auswanderermuseum, a street branches off to the south, Gehöllweg. Another street branches off between the Auswanderermuseum and the sporting ground, but to the north, Kloppweg. The graveyard lies in the village's east end south of the through road. The houses at the Mayweilerhof all stand on the road that leads from Oberalben to Blaubach and Kusel, and indeed also on the watershed between the Kuralb and the Blaubach. Both Oberalben's and the Mayweilerhof's built-up areas clearly show that they were pure farming villages in bygone days.

== History ==
=== Antiquity ===
On the Steinerner Mann, now within the Baumholder Troop Drilling Ground, it is likely that as early as the 19th century a prehistoric times burying ground was found. Today these graves have vanished utterly. It is highly likely that the name "Steinerner Mann" (meaning "Stone Man") for this prominent mountain comb refers to a prehistoric stone pillar, a menhir. Furthermore, prehistoric archaeological finds have been unearthed in all the bordering municipal areas. The road leading over the plateau between the Mayweilerhof and Körborn is supposedly originally an old Roman road. There have also been many Gallo-Roman finds in the area around the village, although none has been brought to light in Oberalben itself.

=== Middle Ages ===
Both Oberalben and Mayweiler (the former village that once lay near where the Mayweilerhof now lies) were founded as far back as the Early Middle Ages, though exact knowledge about when each was founded is lacking. At the time of first documentary mention in a 12th-century document, both villages are known to have been a few centuries old already. According to the document in question, which was issued by King Conrad III of Germany in 1149, a ministerialis of the Church of Reims named Albert from Kusel, possibly a ministerialis from the newly founded monastery on the Remigiusberg, had forcibly taken ownership of three monasterial holdings, namely Villa Milvillre (Mayweiler), Herceberch (Herschberg) and Habbach (Habach, now a constituent community of Eppelborn). It furthermore says that Albert also seized a fief that had been given back to Reims by the knight Sir Hardwin, and that lay near Alben, and had thereby disturbed the Church's independence. The original of this document was lost to the ravages of the Second World War. The text, set down in Conrad III's Diplomata, is taken from a copy. Both villages lay in the so-called Remigiusland, which at about the same time as Oberalben's and Meyweiler's first documentary mention was taken over by the Counts of Veldenz as a Vogtei. The villages lay moreover in the north of this territory. A 1355 border description in a Grenzscheidweistum (a Weistum – cognate with English wisdom – was a legal pronouncement issued by men learned in law in the Middle Ages and early modern times; this one described how a border [Grenze] was to divide [scheiden] the Remigiusland from its neighbour) makes it clear that the local area was a border zone by mentioning the local stream, and also a local, now vanished, village: "Es beginnt an dem Bronnen der Frohnbach die Kuralbe hinab nach Ertzweiler. ..." The two villages themselves are not named, only the brooks. It is believed that the one named here as the Frohnbach is the brook now known as the Stegbach. The village's administration in the Middle Ages was split between the Schultheißerei of Baumholder, which held the lesser portion, and the Amt of Ulmet, which held the greater, in the County of Veldenz, and then later in the Duchy of Palatinate-Zweibrücken. Also important is the mention of both villages in a 1364 document from the Counts of Veldenz as Albin and Minewijlre. At that time, Heinrich of Veldenz, who later became Count Heinrich III of Veldenz, lived together with his young wife Lauretta of Sponheim at Lichtenberg Castle. All villages that then belonged to the Veldenz Amt of Altenglan-Brücken had to pay tribute to this young comital couple. Accordingly, Count Heinrich II had a document drawn up that listed every village in what was then the Unteramt of Altenglan, including these two, which remained with the County of Veldenz until 1444, when it met its end once Count Friedrich III of Veldenz died without a male heir. His daughter Anna wed King Ruprecht's son Count Palatine Stephan. By uniting his own Palatine holdings with the now otherwise heirless County of Veldenz – his wife had inherited the county, but not her father's title – and by redeeming the hitherto pledged County of Zweibrücken, Stephan founded a new County Palatine, as whose comital residence he chose the town of Zweibrücken: the County Palatine – later Duchy – of Palatinate-Zweibrücken, within which Oberalben and Mayweiler found themselves in the Unteramt of Ulmet and the Oberamt of Lichtenberg.

=== Modern times ===
Both Oberalben and Mayweiler now shared a history with the County Palatine of Zweibrücken until this state was swept away in the events of the French Revolution. In 1570/1571, the Zweibrücken official Johannes Schlemmer described the Amt and Gericht (court district) of Baumholder and mentioned Oberalben as then having 12 houses, two of which stood on the Kuralb's left bank, thus putting them in the Amt of Baumholder. Mayweiler was given up as a village sometime around the year 1580, and for almost the next 200 years was not settled. Oberalben did not meet with the same fate. Although during the Thirty Years' War after 1632, nearly all the villages in the Glan valley were empty of people for ten years, a few people in Oberalben managed to survive this grim time, bearing witness to which are birth records in the Ulmet church register. Even so, newcomers came to settle here, too, as they did throughout the depopulated regions after the war, but then came French King Louis XIV's wars of conquest, which led to yet more devastation and loss of life. Living in Oberalben and Frohnbach together in 1675 were eight families, and in 1688 (forty years after the Thirty Years' War ended) there were nine. Both these villages were burnt down in the years that followed. In the earlier decades of the 18th century, though, the population grew quickly, but even without war's ravages, the village suffered a great horror in 1750, when a great fire left only three houses unscathed. The Mayweilerhof, a rural estate, was founded by the Duchy in 1762 (or 1764, according to another source), though not on Mayweiler's former site on the meadowlands of the upper Blaubach, but rather in the same place where it lies today, stretching southwards from the Kuralb-Blaubach watershed. Today it belongs to Oberalben. At first, this new centre was made up of a single homestead in Erbbestand (a uniquely German landhold arrangement in which ownership rights and usage rights were separated; this is forbidden by law in modern Germany), and it became apparent that its cropland and grazing land was quite fertile throughout.

==== Recent times ====
During the time of French rule from 1801 to 1814, Oberalben and the Mayweilerhof lay within the Department of Sarre, the Arrondissement of Birkenfeld, the Canton of Kusel and the Mairie ("Mayoralty") of Ulmet. The Mayweilerhof, which over time had become home to several tenants, now passed with the dissolution of the former Zweibrücken Erbbestand arrangements into private ownership, whereupon it was bought up by the former Zweibrücken state scrivener Johann Heinrich Schleip. He, however, imposed a new tenancy arrangement on the tenants who already dwelt there. As was so throughout the annexed lands that the French now ruled, young men from Oberalben, too, had to serve in the French army. Still preserved now is the content of two letters written home by such a soldier from Oberalben. After Napoleon had been driven out of the region, the Congress of Vienna set forth a new political order, whereby Oberalben and the Mayweilerhof found themselves in the baierischer Rheinkreis, a new exclave of the Kingdom of Bavaria. Bavaria kept the mairie system and thus the two centres still found themselves in the Bürgermeisterei ("Mayoralty") of Ulmet and even the Canton of Kusel, but now in the Landkommissariat (later Bezirksamt, then Kreis or district) of Kusel. The exclave's administrative seat was at Speyer. Only in the latter half of the 19th century was the administrative structure changed. Owing to hereditary divisions and new arrivals, the Mayweilerhof expanded, especially after the turn of the 20th century, becoming once again a small village. In the 1920s and early 1930s, the Nazi Party (NSDAP) became quite popular in Oberalben. In the 1924 Reichstag elections, none of the local votes went to Adolf Hitler's party, but by the 1930 Reichstag elections, this had grown to 10.1%. By the time of the 1933 Reichstag elections, after Hitler had already seized power, local support for the Nazis had swollen to 86.5%. Hitler's success in these elections paved the way for his Enabling Act of 1933 (Ermächtigungsgesetz), thus starting the Third Reich in earnest. In the course of the 1968 administrative restructuring in Rhineland-Palatinate, the Ortsgemeinde of Oberalben with its two Ortsteile of Oberalben and Mayweilerhof passed in 1972 to the then newly founded Verbandsgemeinde of Kusel in the Kusel district.

=== Population development ===
No information about Oberalben's population levels in the Middle Ages is available. According to the 1609 ecclesiastical visitation protocol, there were 11 families and 51 inhabitants living in the village. Only a few people from Oberalben survived the Thirty Years' War, but population figures rose strongly back up in the 18th century, and there was even emigration, which lasted into the 20th century. All the while from the Middle Ages to modern times, the villagers earned their livelihoods at either agriculture or woodworking, although as an income earner, farming had already begun to shrink in importance by the late 19th century. Today, most of the people in the workforce, who belong to the most varied of occupations, must commute elsewhere to their jobs. With respect to religion, the great majority of the villagers belong to the Evangelical faith. The population figures peaked at the turn of the 20th century only for growth to stagnate after the Second World War. Since 2000, population levels have been dropping noticeably.

The following table shows population development over the centuries for Oberalben, with some figures broken down by religious denomination:

Year	1609	1825	1835	1871	1905	1939	1961	1999	2005
Total	51	180	229	310	349	324	311	309	286
Catholic		5					10		30
Evangelical		175					297		200
none		–					4		53
other		–					–		3

=== Municipality's names ===
The word Alb may be of Celtic origin, meaning "brook" and referring to the stream called the Kuralb that flows through the village. Alb also means "light" or "shining" and is also akin to the Latin word albus, which means "white". According to the theory of a Celtic origin, it is likely that the village's Germanic forefathers simply took over the name that the Celts had used. The stream's name became transferred to the village that arose here. In the 1149 document issued by King Conrad III of Germany mentioned above, two Remigiusberg Monastery holdings are mentioned: Terra de Alba and villa Milwilre. Although terra is Latin for "land", this is to be understood to be a village, one lying on the Alb, that is to say, a brook. The root of the name Alb in the drainage system west of Baumholder (Kuralb, Totenalb, Steinalb) is the subject of differences in opinion among regional historians. As discussed above, some derive the name from the Celtic, suggesting that the remnants of Celtic settlement here persisted through Roman times. Likelier, though, is that the name is of Alemannic origin, and that when the Franks drove the Alemanni out of the land (Battle of Tolbiac, or Zülpich, 496), slight remnants of settlement persisted, and thus the Alemannic word for "brook" was retained and adopted (the modern German word for "brook" is Bach, also a common placename element). Oberalben has been called by other names over the ages: Albam (1350), Albin (1364) and Oberalben (1461). Oberalben had its first documentary mention in 1387, and was once known as Alben, later acquiring the prefix Ober— ("Upper") to distinguish it from Alben an der Steinalb (Niederalben) some 8 km away. As for the vanished village of Mayweiler, its name has the common German placename ending —weiler, which as a standalone word means "hamlet" (originally "homestead"). The prefix that went with this was derived from Milo, a Frankish personal name. According to this theory, set forth by researchers Dolch and Greule, the old village would originally have been "Milo's Homestead". Other names that Mayweiler bore over the centuries were Minewijlre (1364), Mynwiler (1440) and Meinweiler (1588). The Mayweilerhof that exists now drew its name from the long vanished village. The ending —hof simply means "estate" or "farm".

== Religion ==
The villages of Oberalben and Mayweiler in the Remigiusland in what is now the Western Palatinate, which from their founding to the time of the Reformation were held by the Archbishopric of Reims, were nonetheless subject under ecclesiastical organization to the Archbishopric of Mainz. Within the regional ecclesiastical organization, the villages might well have belonged from the beginning and even after the Reformation was introduced to the parish of Flurskappeln (Ulmet). The assumption that a chapel once stood near Oberalben (there is a country lane leading to Frohnbach named Kapellweg, or "Chapel Way") was long disputed, but has been confirmed by historical sources. The pastor from Flurskappeln was likely the one who held services. In the late 16th century, this chapel was no longer there, and worshippers had to make the arduous journey to the church near Ulmet to attend services there. In 1588, as demanded by the lord, all the villagers converted from Lutheranism to John Calvin's Reformed faith. Since 1920, Evangelical believers from Oberalben and the Mayweilerhof have been going to church in the neighbouring municipality of Dennweiler-Frohnbach, a branch of the parish of Kusel. The few Catholic Christians attend church in Kusel. Until 1848, the inhabitants of Oberalben and the Mayweilerhof buried their dead at the graveyard near the Flurskapelle (country chapel) in Ulmet. Oberalben now has its own graveyard in the rural cadastral area known as Brechkaut.

== Politics ==
=== Municipal council ===
The council is made up of 6 council members, who were elected by majority vote at the municipal election held on 7 June 2009, and the honorary mayor as chairman.

=== Mayor ===
Oberalben's mayor is Walter Dick, and his deputies are Sonja Kissel and Albrecht Kunz.

=== Coat of arms ===
The German blazon reads: In Blau ein silberner Schrägrechtswellenbalken, oben rechts die verschlungenen, goldenen Großbuchstaben ‚A‘ und ‚V‘, unten links ein rotbewehrter und -bezungter, goldener Löwe.

The municipality's arms might in English heraldic language be described thus: Azure a bend sinister wavy argent between the letter A surmounted by the letter V Or and a lion rampant of the same armed and langued gules.

The bend sinister wavy (diagonal wavy stripe) stands for the stream that runs through the village, the Kuralb. The charge on the sinister (armsbearer's left, viewer's right) side, the House of Wittelsbach (Palatine) lion, is a reference to the village's former allegiance to the Duchy of Palatinate-Zweibrücken. The field tincture, azure (blue), recalls the village's former status as part of the County of Veldenz. The letters "A V" stand for Amt Ulmet (with the V serving as an archaic form of U) and refer to the Bürgermeisterei ("Mayoralty") of Ulmet, to which Oberalben was assigned until 1972, when the Verbandsgemeinde of Kusel was established.

The arms have been borne since 1983 when they were approved by the Regierungsbezirk administration in Neustadt an der Weinstraße.

== Culture and sightseeing ==
=== Buildings ===
The following are listed buildings or sites in Rhineland-Palatinate's Directory of Cultural Monuments:

- Hauptstraße 3a – Auswanderermuseum ("Emigrants' Museum"); former stable-barn, before 1842

=== Regular events ===
The customs kept in Oberalben are those that are usual in the Western Palatinate. There is a Wanderstag ("hiking day") after Christmas, a "New Year's Shooting", the Shrovetide Carnival, locally called Fastnacht, the Whitsuntide custom of the Pfingstquack, ever beloved by children (see the Henschtal article for more about this), the kermis (church consecration festival, locally known as the Kerwe) with the raising of the "bouquet" (actually a decorated spruce tree) and the kermis speech and Saint Martin's parades. This festival is held by the Oberälwer (the name for the villagers in the local speech) on the weekend before Saint Gall's Day (16 October). The timing still recalls the former ties with Ulmet, where the great Gallusmarkt (Saint Gall's Market) is held.

=== Clubs ===
Oberalben has the following clubs, which are largely responsible for local public events:

- FCK-Fanclub "Harter Kern" — 1. FC Kaiserslautern fan club "Hard Core"
- Feuerwehr-Förderverein — fire brigade promotional association
- Förderverein des Auswanderermuseums — Emigrants' Museum promotional association
- Krankenpflegeverein — nursing association
- Landfrauenverein — countrywomen's club (for Dennweiler-Frohnbach, Oberalben and Körborn)
- MGV Erheiterung — men's singing club "Exhilaration"
- Spielvereinigung Dennweiler-Frohnbach und Oberalben — union of sport clubs

=== Museums ===
The Oberalben Emigrants' Museum (Auswanderermuseum Oberalben) at Hauptstraße 3b in the middle of the village shows visitors emigrants' backgrounds, travels and settlement. For more than 300 years, many local people emigrated, particularly to North America, among them baseball legend Babe Ruth's forebears. The museum's whole concept is to use exhibits and display boards to track those who wanted to emigrate through the process of getting approval from the authorities, to the journey over to the chosen new land and finally to their arrival and settlement there. This process took most of the emigrants to North America. The museum is supposed to help the visitor understand the manifold issues, with a special focus on human beings' fates. Technical advice is given the museum by the historians and museologists Dr. Ulrich Wagner and Stefan Knobloch, who work at the Historisches Museum Bremerhaven, as well as Roland Paul from the Institut für Pfälzische Geschichte und Volkskunde (Institute for Palatine History and Folklore) in Kaiserslautern. Since the museum is tended by volunteer helpers, it is only ever open on the first and third Sunday in every month. By mutual agreement, though, visitors can make other arrangements to see the museum. Events of regional importance, particularly concerts, are staged sporadically in the museum's rooms.

== Economy and infrastructure ==
=== Economic structure ===
In earlier times, when the only income earners in Oberalben were farmers and a few craftsmen, there also stood within the village's limits two mills. One stood downstream from the village in the Kuralb valley. This was a watermill at which farmers could only have their grain ground when the actual domain mill in Ruthweiler was overburdened. A newer mill stood on the Stegbach, and thus upstream from the village. Both mills shut down for good as early as the 19th century. Also in business within municipal limits during the 18th century was a small silver mine. There are still agricultural operations even today. Worthy of mention is one family that works the land as a secondary occupation, and strictly organically. The great majority of Oberalben inhabitants must commute to jobs outside the village. It is believed that there are future opportunities for the village in tourism.

=== Education ===
Originally, schoolchildren from Oberalben and the Mayweilerhof had to attend classes in Ulmet. Beginning in 1762, Oberalben, like other places in the Amt of Ulmet too, officially got a winter school (a school geared towards an agricultural community's practical needs, held in the winter, when farm families had a bit more time to spare), after having had "provisory instruction" already for a few years. The first known teacher at the winter school was the former Ulmet reeve Johann Schreiner. For this teacher the municipality paid three barrels and two Sester of corn (wheat or rye) as well as 2 Rhenish guilders, 2 Batzen and 4 Pfennige in cash. Oberalben did not get its own schoolhouse until 1834. This was expanded in 1875 and given a little belltower. Another schoolhouse was built in 1892/1893 on the way leading out of the village towards the east. School was then held there while the old schoolhouse in the middle of the village served as the teacher's dwelling. In 1971, the village school was dissolved. Today, primary school pupils and Hauptschule students attend their respective schools in Kusel.

=== Transport ===
Oberalben lies on Kreisstraße 23, which branches off Landesstraße 76 near Thallichtenberg and leads by way of Körborn, Dennweiler-Frohnbach and Oberalben to Kreisstraße 22 near the Mayweilerhof. On Kreisstraße 22, drivers can reach Bundesstraße 420 in about 3 km, which leads straight into Kusel (5 km). To the south runs the Autobahn A 62 (Kaiserslautern–Trier). The interchange near Konken lies roughly 10 km away. The nearest station is Kusel station, which is the terminus of the Landstuhl–Kusel railway, connecting to Kaiserslautern and is served by an hourly Regionalbahn service RB 67, called the Glantalbahn (the name of which refers to the Glan Valley Railway, which shared some of the route of the Landstuhl–Kusel line).
