= Philipp Hoffmann (footballer) =

German footballer

Personal information
- Date of birth: 19 June 1992 (age 34)
- Place of birth: Blaubach, Germany
- Height: 1.86 m (6 ft 1 in)
- Position: Midfielder

Team information
- Current team: FC 08 Homburg
- Number: 13

Youth career
- –2010: 1. FC Saarbrücken

Senior career*
Years	Team	Apps	(Gls)
2010–2013	1. FC Saarbrücken II	54	(2)
2011–2014	1. FC Saarbrücken	34	(6)
2014–2020	Preußen Münster	161	(15)
2020–2024	FC 08 Homburg	101	(14)
- * Club domestic league appearances and goals as of 29 April 2024

Philipp Hoffmann (born 19 June 1992) is a German professional footballer who plays as a midfielder for FC 08 Homburg.

== Career ==
Born in Blaubach, Hoffmann came through 1. FC Saarbrücken's youth system, and made his debut for the club in a 4–2 3. Liga defeat to Arminia Bielefeld in March 2012, as a substitute for Moustapha Salifou. He made no appearances during the 2012–13 season, but became a first-team regular the following year, his performances being one of the few positives in a poor season which saw Saarbrücken relegated to the Regionalliga West.

Hoffmann stayed in the 3. Liga, however, signing for SC Preußen Münster at the end of the season. He had a total of 161 appearances for Preußen Münster, scoring 15 goals and with 21 assists. He was signed to FC 08 Homburg on August 14, 2020.

In May 2024, FC 08 Homburg announced that Hoffmann would be leaving the club when his contract expires at the end of the summer to avoid risk of further injury.
