= Ruthweiler =

- Municipality
- Coat of arms

- Location of Ruthweiler within Kusel district
- Interactive map of Ruthweiler
- Location within Germany Location within Rhineland-Palatinate
- Coordinates: 49°33′12.21″N 7°21′52.38″E
- Country: Germany
- State: Rhineland-Palatinate
- District: Kusel
- Municipal assoc.: Kusel-Altenglan

Government
  - Mayor (2019–24): Sven Dick

Area
  - Total: 3.31 km^{2} (1.28 sq mi)
- Elevation: 264 m (866 ft)

Population (2025-12-31)
  - Total: 466
  - Density: 141/km^{2} (365/sq mi)
- Time zone: UTC+01:00 (CET)
  - Summer (DST): UTC+02:00 (CEST)
- Postal codes: 66869
- Dialling codes: 06381
- Vehicle registration: KUS
- Website: www.ruthweiler.de

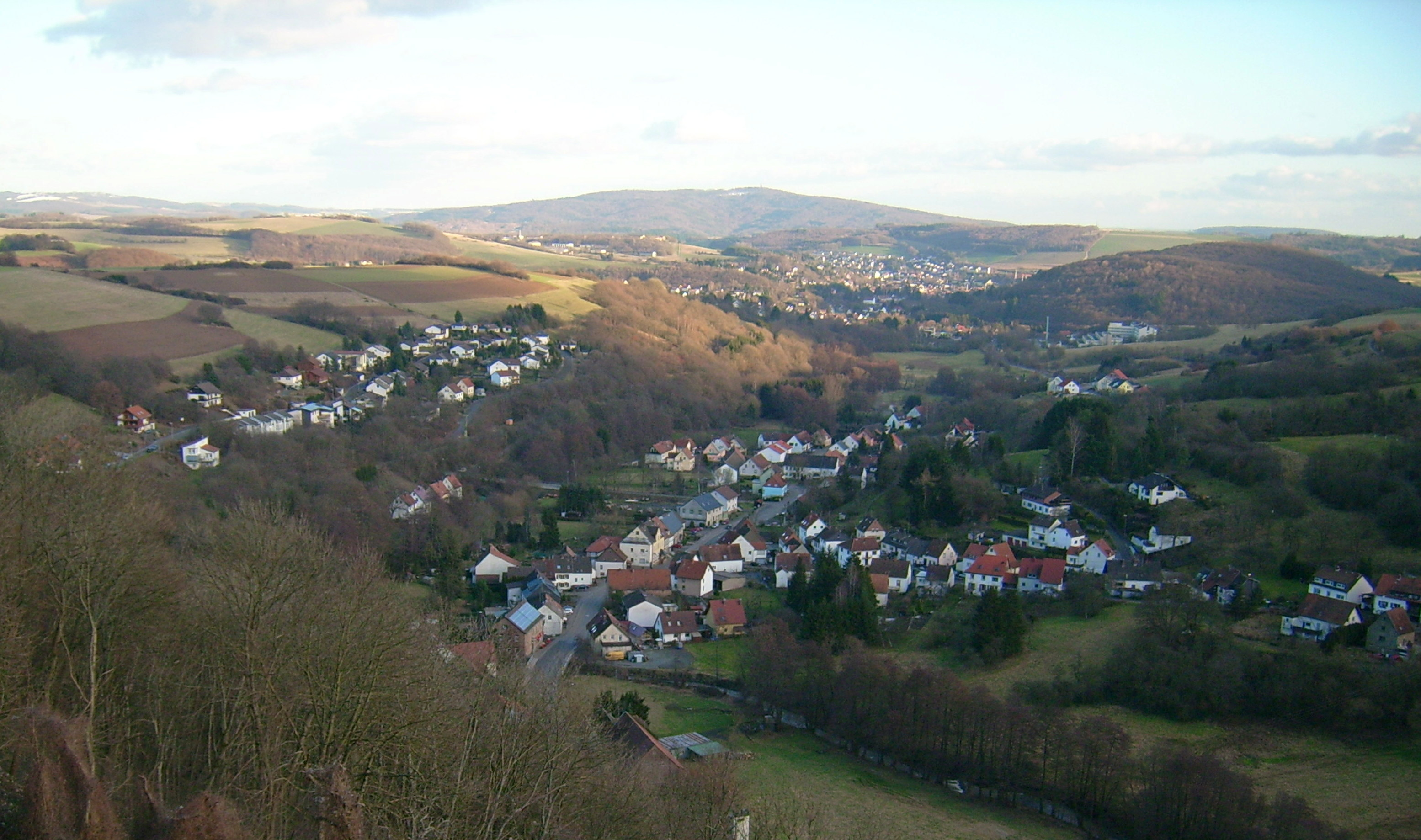
Ruthweiler

Ruthweiler is an Ortsgemeinde – a municipality belonging to a Verbandsgemeinde, a kind of collective municipality – in the Kusel district in Rhineland-Palatinate, Germany. It belongs to the Verbandsgemeinde of Kusel-Altenglan, whose seat is in Kusel.

== Geography ==
=== Location ===
Ruthweiler lies in the Pfeffelbach valley, also called the Aalbach valley, which here is quite narrow. The village sits on the valley floor at an elevation of roughly 270 m above sea level, and looming above it is the great complex of Castle Lichtenberg, which stretches up to the municipal limit, but actually stands within neighbouring Thallichtenberg’s limits. Breaking through the mountain plateau in a narrow gorge with steep rocky sides is the Pfeffelbach. These crags’ appearance, however, has been altered by man's quarrying activities. Also, the hills on the brook's right bank reach higher than 400 m above sea level (Niederberg, 446 m) while those on the left bank reach roughly 350 m. The continuous woodlands stretch east of the village on the Niederberg. The municipal area measures 332 ha, of which 36 ha is wooded.

=== Neighbouring municipalities ===
Ruthweiler borders in the northeast on the municipality of Körborn, in the south on the town of Kusel (constituent communities of Diedelkopf and Bledesbach), in the west on the municipality of Pfeffelbach and in the northwest on the municipality of Thallichtenberg.

=== Constituent communities ===
Also belonging to Ruthweiler is an outlying hospital complex, the Krankenhaus Kusel.

=== Municipality’s layout ===
Ruthweiler was originally a linear village (or by some definitions, a “thorpe”) with the built-up area on the brook's right bank. As early as the 19th century, sidestreets and bulges in the otherwise linear built-up area began to appear. A new building zone arose on the mountain slope over on the left bank. Of the two former estate mills, one is found at the village's upper end and the other at the lower end. In the middle of the village stands the former schoolhouse, now the village community centre. The graveyard lies down the valley at a junction on the road to Kusel. The Krankenhaus Kusel (hospital) on the east slope of the Heibelberg (Westpfalzklinikum II) stands east of the village, but still within its limits, despite its name. Further new building zones are to be opened. Alongside the road once ran the Kusel-Türkismühle railway line, which was built in 1936 and closed in 1969, and whose right-of-way is now used as a hiking and cycling trail.

== History ==
=== Antiquity ===
In the area where Ruthweiler now lies, people had already settled in prehistoric times. Bearing witness to this is an archaeological find: “stump-butted axe with whetted edge, porphyry, length 20 cm. At the discovery site, a fine ash layer and two non-local agate or basalt stones were discovered. It could be a matter of a settlement find.” This stone axe was long held to be the oldest prehistoric archaeological find in the Kusel district, being from the middle of the New Stone Age. Author Bantelmann, who wrote the above quotation, wrongly states that the discovery site lay within the town of Kusel, but the axe was actually found in a loam pit on the east slope of the Heibelberg in the area where the Westpfalzklinikum II was later built. The incorrect information stems from a mistake made by local historians from Kusel who deposited the axe in the Town and Local History Museum. Had this mistake not been made, the axe's official discovery site would have been in Ruthweiler, and thus on the other side of what was at the time a Regierungsbezirk boundary, which in turn would have required the artefact to be kept at a museum in Trier. Furthermore, archaeological finds in neighbouring municipalities show that people in the area in prehistoric times did not merely stay temporarily. In Gallo-Roman times especially, the area was relatively heavily settled, bearing witness to which are finds from the surrounding area (Giant Horseman of Diedelkopf, several villae rusticae within Thallichtenberg’s limits, the Mithraic monument in Reichweiler).

=== Middle Ages ===
Regional historians have determined that Ruthweiler’s founding date was sometime in the 8th or 9th century, putting it in the time when the Franks were newly settling the land. The founding likely actually came later, but certainly long before the village’s first documentary mention. Ruthweiler lay in the Remigiusland and thus became a holding of the County of Veldenz in the early 12th century, and like all villages in this state, ended up in 1444 under the overlordship of the then newly founded County Palatine of Zweibrücken. The village’s first documentary mention in 1267 (according to Weingarth) comes from a taxation book from the monastery on the Remigiusberg. The 1371 document with the name Nyder Rudewilre (“Lower Ruthweiler”) deals with a border description defining the geographical limits of the Burgfrieden (castle's sovereign area) of Castle Lichtenberg. This further shows that at that time, there were two villages, a lower one and an upper one. Ruthweiler's peasants, like those in other villages in the Burgfrieden, had to do compulsory labour for Castle Lichtenberg. Taxes also had to be paid, to the County Palatine as well as the Wörschweiler Monastery and the Counts of Sickingen.

=== Modern times ===
The time when the County Palatine (later Duchy) of Zweibrücken held sway yields more precise information about Ruthweiler. In 1446, winegrowers reaped at the Rudewillr Wingert (a vineyard) 3½ Fuder of wine (3 500 L). From 1544 comes an account that tells of a miller named Leonhard from Schweinfurt who held the village's upper mill in Erbbestand (a uniquely German landhold arrangement in which ownership rights and usage rights were separated; this is forbidden by law in modern Germany). In 1570, Ruthweiler was also liable for taxation to the knight Sir Stumpf of Simmern (Ritter Stumpf von Simmern). Johannes Hoffmann described the village and its environs in his 1588 description of the Oberamt of Lichtenberg. During the Thirty Years' War, neighbouring Castle Lichtenberg was not destroyed, but the surrounding villages suffered greatly under both the war's ravages and the prevailing sicknesses, foremost among these being the Plague. Ruthweiler was utterly destroyed during this war and afterwards had to be settled all over again. Further hardship and woe came in the late 17th century with French King Louis XIV’s wars of conquest. In the 18th century, the village once again reached its former size. In 1749, the wooden bridge, which was so often falling into disrepair, was replaced with a stone bridge, and peasants could now reach their plots on the far side of the brook without a problem.

==== Recent times ====
In connection with the events of the French Revolution, the old feudal structures were swept away and new territorial entities sprang up. During the time of French rule, Ruthweiler belonged to the Mairie (“Mayoralty”) of Burglichtenberg, the Canton of Kusel, the Arrondissement of Birkenfeld and the Department of Sarre. After Napoleon’s troops were defeated and driven out of Germany, the victorious powers discussed a new territorial order, and the Congress of Vienna wrought yet another territorial reorganization. In 1816, Ruthweiler passed to the Principality of Lichtenberg. Put together from part of the former Oberamt of Lichtenberg, parts of the former Electorate of Trier and the Waldgraviate-Rhinegraviate, this was a newly created exclave of the Duchy of Saxe-Coburg-Saalfeld, which as of 1826 became the Duchy of Saxe-Coburg and Gotha. Its seat was Sankt Wendel, and it was subdivided into the Cantons of Sankt Wendel, Baumholder (in which Ruthweiler lay) and Grumbach. Ruthweiler was a border town in this new territorial order, lying right at the principality’s eastern limit. As part of this state, Ruthweiler passed in 1834 by sale – the price was 2,100,000 Thalers – to the Kingdom of Prussia, which made this area into the Sankt Wendel district in the Rhine Province. More locally, Ruthweiler lay within the Bürgermeisterei (“Mayoralty”) and later Amt of Burglichtenberg. Although the name Burglichtenberg is almost the same as Burg Lichtenberg, the German name for Castle Lichtenberg, the name was not drawn from the castle itself, but rather from a small village that had arisen on the castle grounds after the castle itself had been burnt down in 1799. Later, after the First World War, the Treaty of Versailles stipulated, among other things, that 26 of the Sankt Wendel district's 94 municipalities had to be ceded to the British- and French-occupied Saar in 1919. The remaining 68 municipalities then bore the designation “Restkreis St. Wendel-Baumholder”, with the first syllable of Restkreis having the same meaning as in English, in the sense of “left over”. The district seat was at Baumholder. Ruthweiler belonged to the Restkreis until 1937, when it was transferred to the Birkenfeld district. This was created by uniting the Restkreis with a hitherto Oldenburg district of that same name. The new, bigger district was grouped into the Prussian Regierungsbezirk of Koblenz. After the Second World War, the village at first lay in the Regierungsbezirk of Koblenz in the then newly founded state of Rhineland-Palatinate. In the course of administrative restructuring in this state in 1968, the Amt of Burglichtenberg was dissolved on 1 January 1972. Ruthweiler passed to the newly founded Verbandsgemeinde of Kusel-Altenglan and to the Kusel district, in which it remains today. It also found itself in the new Regierungsbezirk of Rheinhessen-Pfalz, although this has since been dissolved.

=== Population development ===
In earlier days, the Ruthweiler villagers earned their livelihoods mainly at agriculture, though even by the Middle Ages and right up until the French Revolution, Castle Lichtenberg also employed compulsory labourers, day labourers, maidservants and menservants. Since only a few people can today earn a living at farming in Ruthweiler, the village has undergone a shift towards a residential community for people in the most varied of occupations, mostly outside the village. The 1609 Oberamt of Lichtenberg ecclesiastical visitation protocol identified Ruthweiler at that time as being a rather big village. In the course of the Thirty Years' War, though, the wartime ravages and the Plague utterly depopulated the village, and newcomers settled it again, with the population in the years that followed only slowly recovering its numbers. From the late 18th century until the mid 19th century, steady growth was to be noted, but more recently, the trend has been a stagnant one, with population levels hardly changing at all since the 1920s. Nevertheless, this must be considered against the backdrop of a general fall in population in the Kusel district as a whole. It could be that Ruthweiler's population levels have been holding steady rather than shrinking because the village lies right near the district seat of Kusel.

The following table shows population development over the centuries for Ruthweiler:

Year	609	1648	1675	1772	1789	1816	1843	1861	1926	1960	1992	2003	2005
Total	86	–	45	120	150	197	286	366	520	556	550	553	540

=== Municipality’s name ===
The village's name, Ruthweiler, has the common German placename ending —weiler, which as a standalone word means “hamlet” (originally “homestead”), to which is prefixed a syllable Ruth—, believed to have arisen from a man's name, Ruodo, suggesting that the village arose from a homestead founded by an early Frankish settler named Ruodo. According to J. Weingarth, the village had its first documentary mention in 1267 in a cartulary from the monastery on the Remigiusberg, in which it was named as Rudewiler. In 1371, the form Nyeder Rudewilre appeared. Other names that the village has borne over time are Rudewilr (1390), Rudewiller (1436) and Rothweiler (1740).

=== Vanished villages ===
It is unclear whether the village of Heubweiler, mentioned in the 14th century, lay within Ruthweiler's or Kusel-Diedelkopf's limits. It is likely that both villages now hold a share of this vanished village. Heubweiler lay southwest of Diedelkopf in the area where the hospital now stands. It had its first documentary mention in 1318 as Hupvilre – and its last documentary mention in 1588 as Heubweiler by Johannes Hoffmann, but even then, Hoffmann described it as an old (that is, former) village site.

== Religion ==
As one of the villages within the Castle Lichtenberg Burgfrieden, people from Ruthweiler always attended services at the church at Castle Lichtenberg, which from the Middle Ages to early modern times was Saint George’s Chapel, and as of 1758 the newly built church near the tithe barn. Ludwig II, Duke of Zweibrücken, who died in 1532, was already a supporter of the Reformation, which was introduced bindingly, and according to Martin Luther’s teachings, for all the duchy’s subjects under Ludwig’s brother, Ruprecht, who was acting as regent for Duke Wolfgang, who had not yet come of age. Beginning in 1588, Count Palatine Johannes I forced all his subjects to convert to Reformed belief as espoused by John Calvin. In the Saxe-Cobourg Principality of Lichtenberg and later on, in the Prussian Rhine Province, the Protestant church establishment in Ruthweiler found its way into today’s Evangelical Church in the Rhineland (a full member of the Evangelical Church in Germany). The Duke of Saxe-Cobourg decreed the merger of the two Protestant denominations in 1818, and the decision handed down by a synod in Baumholder in 1820 instituted the “complete union” of the two denominations, Lutheranism and Calvinism. The now united Evangelical Church of the Principality of Lichtenberg belonged in Prussian times after 1834 within the Rhenish Provincial Church to the church district of Sankt Wendel. Fundamentally, this organizational structure remains in place even today. The municipality got its first graveyard in 1828. Formerly, the dead had had to be buried in either Pfeffelbach or Kusel. The new graveyard came into being in 1925. Although the Catholic faith was once again allowed after the Thirty Years' War, Evangelical Christians have retained their majority down to the present day. The village's Roman Catholics, as guided by their historical development, belong to the deaconry of Sankt Wendel in the Diocese of Trier.

== Politics ==
=== Municipal council ===
The council is made up of 8 council members, who were elected by majority vote at the municipal election held on 7 June 2009, and the honorary mayor as chairman.

=== Mayor ===
Ruthweiler's mayor is Sven Dick (elected on 7 June 2009), and his deputies are Alfred Weber and Lothar Schwarz.

=== Coat of arms ===
The German blazon reads: Von Silber und Blau geteilt, oben ein wachsender, rotbewehrter und -bezungter, blauer Löwe, unten zwei waagrecht übereinanderliegende, silberne Mühleisen.

The municipality's arms might in English heraldic language be described thus: Per fess argent a demilion azure armed and langued gules and azure two millrinds fesswise in pale of the first.

The charge in the upper field, the lion, is drawn from the heraldic device once borne by the Counts of Veldenz, who were once the local lords. The millrinds symbolize the two former lordly mills whose waterwheels once turned on the brook in Ruthweiler. The arms have been borne since 4 October 1962 when they were approved by the Rhineland-Palatinate Ministry of the Interior.

== Culture and sightseeing ==
=== Buildings ===
The following are listed buildings or sites in Rhineland-Palatinate’s Directory of Cultural Monuments:

- Hauptstraße 10 – former gristmill and contract sawmill; sophisticated stone-block building, 1869, on top of three older basement floors, weirhouse with waterwheel; contract sawmill with stabling
- Hauptstraße 19 – former customs house of the Principality of Lichtenberg; plastered building on high stone-block pedestal, 1831, architect Johann Martin Flaadt, Sankt Wendel, expansion 1856

=== Regular events ===
Ruthweiler holds its kermis (church consecration festival) on the first weekend in July. Other old – and new – customs follow the general pattern seen elsewhere in the Kuseler Land.

=== Clubs ===
Village life is shaped by the municipality’s clubs. Ruthweiler has an 1. FC Kaiserslautern fan club called Briggedeiwel, and also a countrywomen’s club, a shooting club called Germania and a conversational club.

=== Sport and leisure ===
Ruthweiler has a village community centre, a boules court and hiking trails.

== Economy and infrastructure ==
=== Economic structure ===
The Ortsgemeinde, which was formerly characterized by agriculture, has since about 1995 undergone a shift to a residential community. About agricultural development, mechanization and the industry’s concentration in fewer hands, there is an exhaustive book by Weingarth (1996). Today, agriculture plays only a subordinate role in Ruthweiler’s economy, many farms having been given up and a few having expanded. The village is nowadays a residential community for people in the most varied of occupations. The nearby castle also affords good opportunities for promoting tourism. Ruthweiler has opened four new building areas, including the first one in the Verbandsgemeinde of Kusel financed by a private investor, “Borrech”.

=== Established businesses ===
Ruthweiler's businesses include an inn, a café and a shop.

=== Public institutions ===
Ruthweiler also has a village archive, created and maintained by a municipal club.

=== Education ===
As a result of the Reformation and the efforts to afford believers access to the Bible, the Protestant rulers in general tried to further the cause of schooling. Thus, a school came into being in the latter half of the 16th century at Castle Lichtenberg for school-aged children within the Burgfrieden, that is, those living in Thallichtenberg, Ruthweiler, Körborn, Bistert (a now vanished village near Thallichtenberg) and Frohnbacher Hof. This first school for the region around the castle wasonly sparsely attended, not least of all because the walk to school was long and arduous. All the good intentions that went into these initiatives in the late 16th and early 17th centuries, however, were annihilated in the ravages of the Thirty Years' War. School, however, began again quite soon after the war. Listed on the castle steward's 1671 chart (23 years after the war ended) are three pupils from Ruthweiler, fewer than half the village's school-aged children. Usually, a boy would have to stay home to tend the livestock, and he would then claim that he already knew how to read and write. It was first and foremost cold and other bad weather that explained younger children's absence from class. Children legally had to go to school at Castle Lichtenberg not only during Palatinate-Zweibrücken times, but also during Saxe-Coburg and Gotha and Prussian times. In 1834, the then Amtsbürgermeister Sohns bought the former state scrivener's office at Castle Lichtenberg at auction to have a school set up inside it for schoolchildren from Burglichtenberg, Thallichtenberg and Ruthweiler. Of the villages of the Burgfrieden, the village of Bistert had now ceased to exist, while Körborn and the Frohnbacherhof now lay in the Kingdom of Bavaria and thus, fitted into another school framework. After Thallichtenberg got its own schoolhouse in 1845, the school at the castle only served schoolchildren from Burglichtenberg and Ruthweiler. In 1870, the castle schoolhouse burnt down, and then the municipalities of Burglichtenberg and Ruthweiler built a new one in the upper village. In 1910, Burglichtenberg, the settlement within the castle grounds, was dissolved. Families who wanted to keep living there thenceforth belonged to the municipality of Thallichtenberg. Since Thallichtenberg was now also asserting ownership rights on the schoolhouse in Ruthweiler and was demanding a financial adjustment, a court case ensued that was put to an end only after the Second World War by a compromise. After Ruthweiler was grouped into the Kusel district in 1969, primary school pupils attended classes in Pfeffelbach. Since then, the Hauptschule students have been attending school in Kusel. Also represented in Kusel are other types of school (Gymnasium, Realschule, vocational school, special schools).

=== Transport ===
Ruthweiler lies on Landesstraße 176, which links Kusel with Baumholder. The nearest Autobahn interchanges are on Autobahn A 62 (Kaiserslautern–Trier), running to the south, at Kusel and Reichweiler some 5 and 8 km away, respectively. Kreisstraße 23 leads by way of Castle Lichtenberg to Körborn. Serving Kusel is Kusel station on the Landstuhl–Kusel railway.

== Notable residents ==
- Ludwig (Louis) Gassert (b. about 1770 at Castle Lichtenberg) was castle steward Christoph Gassert's (1756–1795) son. He lived in Ruthweiler and became the mayor.
