= Körborn =

- Municipality
- Coat of arms

- Location of Körborn within Kusel district
- Interactive map of Körborn
- Location within Germany Location within Rhineland-Palatinate
- Coordinates: 49°33′51″N 7°22′12″E
- Country: Germany
- State: Rhineland-Palatinate
- District: Kusel
- Municipal assoc.: Kusel-Altenglan

Government
  - Mayor (2019–24): Hartmut Krökel

Area
  - Total: 5.86 km^{2} (2.26 sq mi)
- Elevation: 339 m (1,112 ft)

Population (2025-12-31)
  - Total: 339
  - Density: 57.8/km^{2} (150/sq mi)
- Time zone: UTC+01:00 (CET)
  - Summer (DST): UTC+02:00 (CEST)
- Postal codes: 66871
- Dialling codes: 06381
- Vehicle registration: KUS

Körborn is an Ortsgemeinde – a municipality belonging to a Verbandsgemeinde, a kind of collective municipality – in the Kusel district in Rhineland-Palatinate, Germany. It belongs to the Verbandsgemeinde of Kusel-Altenglan, whose seat is in Kusel.

== Geography ==
=== Location ===
Körborn lies in the headwaters of the Mühlbach, which rises on the plateau north of the town of Kusel, and flows out of a broad hollow in a narrow, steep valley southeastwards to the Kuselbach. Towards the north, the municipal area stretches rather a long way to the houses of the little village of the Breitsesterhof (an outlying centre of Baumholder), while towards the south, the municipality's administrative area reaches to a point near Diedelkopf (an outlying centre of Kusel). In the east-west direction, it broadens out only slightly, but jutting out from the built-up area are two bulges. The western one reaches right out to Castle Lichtenberg (although this lies just outside Körborn's limits in Thallichtenberg), while the eastern one runs along the so-called Roman road towards the Mayweilerhof (an outlying centre of Oberalben). The village itself sits at its lower elevations at 360 m above sea level, and at its higher ones at 390 m above sea level. In the municipal area's wooded northern reaches, the land at first falls off into a dale, the Baumholder Loch (Loch means “hole” in German), only to rise up again on the far side to heights reaching more than 400 m above sea level. The highest point that has been measured within the municipality's limits is one in the woods out near the Breitsesterhof reaching 456 m above sea level. The eastern and western bulges, too, both break the 400-metre mark in elevation. The lowest point in the municipality is one near Diedelkopf in the Mühlbach valley where the land drops down to about 270 m above sea level. The municipal area measures 586 ha, of which 138 ha is wooded.

=== Neighbouring municipalities ===
Körborn borders in the north on the municipality of Dennweiler-Frohnbach, in the northeast on the municipality of Oberalben, in the east on the municipality of Blaubach, in the south on the town of Kusel, in the southwest on the municipality of Ruthweiler, in the west on the municipality of Thallichtenberg and in the northwest on the town of Baumholder.

=== Municipality’s layout ===
The old village stretches along the road (Kreisstraße 23) that leads from Dennweiler-Frohnbach to Thallichtenberg, concentrating itself in the upper hollow of the dale through which the brook runs, thereby forming a village core, where two roads meet. The through road bends here towards the southeast (whereafter it is designated Kreisstraße 24) into the valley of the Mühlbach, while a linking road (likewise designated Kreisstraße 23) runs southwestwards to Castle Lichtenberg. Towards the north, a street climbs up to new building zones. The schoolhouse, built in 1936, stands here, although this is nowadays a village community centre. Before it stands a belltower, and next to it the fire station. The newest building areas spread out not only here in the municipality's far north, but also in the east along Römerstraße (“Roman Road”, but here actually a street within the village) and along the linking road to Castle Lichtenberg as well as along sidestreets in this area. The graveyard lies alongside this road on the way out of the village. In the oldest part of the village is still found a row of original Westrich (a historic region that encompasses areas in both Germany and France) farmhouses (Einfirsthaus or “single-roof-ridge house” type), although most have been altered by conversions.

== History ==
=== Antiquity ===
In almost every village in the area, there have been archaeological finds that bear witness to human habitation in prehistoric times, although no such finds have been unearthed in Körborn's municipal area. The same is true for finds from Roman times.

=== Middle Ages ===
At the time of Körborn's first documentary mention in 1270, it lay in the County of Veldenz, resident in which at the time was Count Heinrich von Geroldseck, whose wife was Agnes, Count Gerlach V's daughter. Since his father-in-law was the last count of the older line of Veldenz, Heinrich became the founder of the newer line. It cannot be assumed that the date of first documentary mention is also the village's founding date, for nothing is known about when Körborn actually arose as a settled place. It could have been a few years earlier, or a few hundred. Place-name researchers do not rule out a founding as far back as pre-Germanic times. The County of Veldenz was founded in 1112, mainly out of various Vogteien over ecclesiastical landholds, particularly the Remigiusland, a region around Kusel that belonged to the Abbey of Saint-Remi in Reims. According to the 1270 document, Körborn was then a Veldenz fief held by the Burgmann Johannes Raubesak at Castle Lichtenberg, who had to pay the Provost at the Remigiusberg Monastery a certain sum of money. The name Raubesak suggests that Sir Johannes sometimes indulged himself in highway robbery (rauben is still the German word for “rob”), although this is not known for sure. According to a 1376 document, a squire of Sötern acknowledged that Count Heinrich II of Veldenz had made him a Burgmann, and that as payment for his service he had also been awarded the village of Kerborn. The village then belonged to the Burgfrieden (literally “castle peace”, a truce imposed within a castle’s domain) of Lichtenberg Castle, which stood only a few kilometres away. The peasants from Körborn, and from all villages within the Burgfrieden, continually had to do compulsory labour, either at the castle itself or otherwise for the Burgmannen. In 1444, the County of Veldenz met its end when Count Friedrich III of Veldenz died without a male heir. His daughter Anna wed King Ruprecht’s son Count Palatine Stephan. By uniting his own Palatine holdings with the now otherwise heirless County of Veldenz – his wife had inherited the county, but not her father’s title – and by redeeming the hitherto pledged County of Zweibrücken, Stephan founded a new County Palatine, as whose comital residence he chose the town of Zweibrücken: the County Palatine – later Duchy – of Palatinate-Zweibrücken.

=== Modern times ===
Thus, also from the 16th century onwards up until the late 18th century, Körborn shared the same history as the now former County of Veldenz and its successor state, Palatinate-Zweibrücken. Cörbern still belonged, as before, to the Burgfrieden of Castle Lichtenberg along with the villages of Thallichtenberg, Ruthweiler and Bistert (now vanished). According to Johannes Hoffmann’s 1588 description of the Amt of Lichtenberg, Körborn lay in the fifth Hauptgrund (literally “main ground”): “In this case … herein: The Cörbergrundt is 8,600 feet or 573 roods and 5 feet. In this lies above at the end or the beginning the village of Cörbern. The dell, called Müllenbach, is 5,170 feet or 344 roods and 10 feet long, falls into the Cörpergrundt”. Hoffmann used the word Schuch (in today's German, Schuh – literally “shoe”) for “foot” and Ruttenn or Rutten for “roods”. He also identified the “dell” (he used the same word in German) with the brook running through it. According to this report, the Mühlbach was called the Cörbergrundt (or Cörpergrundt) and the Müllbach was said to be a side valley of this “ground”. It is unlikely that a mill (Mühle in German) ever stood on either of these brooks. During the Thirty Years' War, the nearby Castle Lichtenberg escaped the customary destruction, though the villages all around it suffered heavily under the horrors wrought by the war and also by the Plague. Körborn was likely utterly destroyed in this war and afterwards newly settled. Further hardship and woe came in the late 17th century with French King Louis XIV's wars of conquest. Only in the 18th century was their steady population growth. From a report by Daniel Hinkelmann that has been preserved to the present day come details about agricultural conditions in those days. The first survey of the municipal area known to history was done in 1745 by the Ducal Renovator Gottfried Sundahl from Zweibrücken, who determined the area to be 3,455 Morgen. According to documents from 1777 issued by the Keller (collector) at Castle Lichtenberg, Johann Christoph Gassert, the municipality then had 1,287 Morgen of cropland of which 341 Morgen lay at the municipality's outermost edges, 245 Morgen of meadowland and 323 Morgen of woodland and grazing land. Produced were, among other things, 5,070 bales of corn straw and 2,845 bales of fodder straw. Of the cropland mentioned above, only 190 Morgen were dunged, which according to Gassert's calculations yielded 3,420 sheaves of grain, and therefrom all together 213 Malter of actual grain. The 42 Morgen of stubble fields and boggier land yielded 6 sheaves to a Morgen and therefore 252 sheaves all together, and thus 15 Malter and 3 Fass (“barrels”). Of the 269½ Morgen planted with summer crops, one third with potatoes, the yield for one Morgen was 15 Malter, all together 1,350 Malter of potatoes, while 179 Morgen of barley and oats yielded 3 Malter (roughly 6 hundredweight) to a Morgen, and thus all together 537 Malter. The livestock kept in that year broke down as follows: 1 horse, 48 oxen, 43 cows, 41 other cattle, 473 wethers and other sheep, 190 lambs and 182 pigs.

==== Recent times ====
As a result of the events during the French Revolution, there was a thorough collapse of the old feudal structures, and new territorial entities arose. Körborn belonged during the time of French rule to the Mairie (“Mayoralty”) of Burglichtenberg, the Canton of Kusel, the Arrondissement of Birkenfeld and the Department of Sarre. After the victory over French forces towards the end of Napoleonic times, the victorious powers worked out a new territorial order by 1815 at the Congress of Vienna. For Körborn, the upshot was that it now found itself in a new exclave of considerable size that the Congress had chosen to award to the Kingdom of Bavaria, but not at all far inside it, for it now lay right at the border with the likewise newly created Principality of Lichtenberg itself a newly created exclave of the Duchy of Saxe-Coburg-Saalfeld, which as of 1826 became the Duchy of Saxe-Coburg and Gotha. Körborn now lay in the Bürgermeisterei (“Mayoralty”) of Kusel, the Canton of Kusel and the Landcommissariat (district) of Kusel. After the Second World War, the village lay in the Regierungsbezirk of Neustadt in the then newly founded state of Rhineland-Palatinate. In the course of administrative restructuring in this state in 1968, Körborn passed as a self-administering Ortsgemeinde to the then newly founded Verbandsgemeinde of Kusel in 1972. This originally lay in the Regierungsbezirk of Rheinhessen-Pfalz, but Rhineland-Palatinate has since abolished its Regierungsbezirke.

=== Population development ===
The villagers formerly earned their livelihoods mainly from agriculture, though even as early as the Middle Ages and on to the time of the French Revolution, Castle Lichtenberg employed compulsory labourers and day labourers, as well as menservants and maidservants. Since farming now employs only a few people, Körborn has become a residential community for people who work in business, as labourers or as employees in a broad range of occupations, who mostly have to seek jobs elsewhere. According to a 1609 ecclesiastical visitation protocol of the Amt of Lichtenberg, Körborn could be said to be, with a population of roughly 80 inhabitants, a rather big village for the time, but like almost all other villages in the area, it was wiped out in the course of the Thirty Years' War and by the Plague. After the war, the population rose only slowly, mostly with the arrival of newcomers. There were, however, further reductions in population due to French King Louis XIV's wars of conquest. From the early 18th century to the mid 19th century, steady growth raised the figure to more than 200 inhabitants. The 300-mark was breached before the Second World War. After the war, once the population had been bolstered somewhat by refugees from Germany's former eastern territories, reaching a level of some 340 inhabitants, a trend of stagnation set in. Whereas for the Kusel district as a whole a general drop in population can be noted, Körborn does at least show slight growth. The foremost cause for this is the village's proximity to the district seat of Kusel.

The following table shows population development over the centuries for Körborn, with some figures broken down by religious denomination:

Year	1609	1675	1825	1871	1895	1905	1939	1961	1950	1970	2005
Total	16*	12*	205	260	275	286	305	331	348	345	385
Catholic			1					23
Evangelical			204					297
Other			–					11

* Denotes number of families.

=== Municipality’s name ===
The oldest known form of the village's name, Curberin, crops up in a 1270 document, which is reproduced in the original Latin in Franz Xaver Remling's 1856 work as “Appendix 10”; a translation into German appears in Manfred Mayer's 1996 work. Remling clearly doubted whether the village's name had been transcribed from the original document properly, and he inserted the form Corbora as another possibility. Whatever the truth is, placename researchers take the view that the name Körborn goes back to the Latin word corvus (“crow”). Going by this, the name Curberin or Corbora would mean a place where crows stayed. Given the name's Latin origin, it could be that it goes back to pre-Germanic times, although this is mere speculation. Other interpretations of the name are unknown. Other forms that the name has taken over the ages are, among others, Korborn (1357), Korbern (1357, 1371, 1376, 1477), and Kerborn (1570). The form that is current today, Körborn, only first cropped up in 1824.

=== Vanished villages ===
According to Hinkelmann (1970), the village of Ruppertsweiler, although it likely lay within Dennweiler-Frohnbach’s current limits, might instead have lain in the so-called Baumholder Loch, that is to say, within Körborn’s current limits. Likewise in the Baumholder Loch once supposedly lay a place called Höfchen (“Little Estate”). However, no documents are known to confirm such a place's existence.

== Religion ==
As Körborn was one of the villages within the Burgfrieden of Castle Lichtenberg, the villagers attended services at the castle church during the Middle Ages. By early modern times, they were going to Saint George’s Chapel (St. Georgskapelle) and by 1758 to the newly built church near the tithe barn. In 1523, the Reformation was introduced into the Duchy of Palatinate-Zweibrücken and made binding on all the subjects. Then, in 1588, everybody had to convert again, this time to Reformed belief according to John Calvin (Calvinism) on Count Palatine (Duke) Johannes I’s orders. When Körborn lay in the Kingdom of Bavaria after the French Revolution, Napoleonic times and the Congress of Vienna, the Evangelical Christians, who were still the majority, and the village’s few Catholics attended the churches in Kusel. As early as the Middle Ages, Körborn was burying its dead at the graveyard in Kusel, and sometimes also at the one in Pfeffelbach. About 1760, the municipality right by the castle wanted to lay out its own graveyard, but the Zweibrücken government would not grant its approval. A graveyard for Körborn, the Frohnbacher Hof and the castle was soon built, however, in 1761, only it was built farther from the castle. It nonetheless bore the name Lichtenberger Kirchhof (Kirchhof means “churchyard”). Even today, both the village's Evangelicals and its Catholics attend the respective churches in Kusel.

== Politics ==
=== Municipal council ===
The council is made up of 8 council members, who were elected by majority vote at the municipal election held on 7 June 2009, and the honorary mayor as chairman.

=== Mayor ===
Körborn's mayor is Hartmut Krökel.

=== Coat of arms ===
The German blazon reads: In Silber auf grünem Grund eine von goldenen Ständern gestützte, grüne Linde.

The municipality's arms might in English heraldic language be described thus: Argent on ground vert a limetree of the same underpinned by posts Or.

The composition is drawn from an old seal from 1741. In an earlier version, the posts stood on a red wall, which may have been meant to depict a well. This would have been a canting charge for the placename element —born, which means “well” (although Brunnen is the usual German word for this today). The version in force today has been borne since 1983 when it was approved by the now defunct Rheinhessen-Pfalz Regierungsbezirk administration in Neustadt an der Weinstraße.

== Culture and sightseeing ==
=== Buildings ===
The following are listed buildings or sites in Rhineland-Palatinate’s Directory of Cultural Monuments:

- Hauptstraße 20 – former Quereinhaus (a combination residential and commercial house divided for these two purposes down the middle, perpendicularly to the street), about 1860, ambitious expansion, 1911, architect Julius Berndt, Kusel; characterizes village’s appearance
- Alter Friedhof (“Old Graveyard”), southwest of the village on the road to Thallichtenberg – sculptured keystone, marked 1762
- Queckenbrunnen (well), on Burgstraße, northeast of Castle Lichtenberg – quarrystone building with flat concrete roof, 1890s

=== Regular events ===
Körborn's kermis (church consecration festival) is held on the last weekend in June. Other customs are, as in all surrounding villages, Fastnacht (Shrovetide Carnival), the raising of the Maypole and the May Day dance and the Whitsuntide Pfingstquack (“Whitsun” is Pfingsten in German). The —quack part of the custom's name refers to a rhyme that children recite as they go door to door begging for money with their gorse-decked wagon. The rhyme generally begins with the line “Quack, Quack, Quack”. On the eve of May Day (which to some is Walpurgis Night), the municipality lays out a meal at the village community centre with Wellfleisch mit Sauerkraut (a boiled-meat dish containing, according to one source, rindless pork belly, water, salt, pepper, dried marjoram and onion) fresh from the boiling pot and original Körborn Hausmacher Schlachtplatte (the first word means that it is “homemade”), along with the obligatory beer straight from the keg.

=== Clubs ===
Körborn has a fire brigade promotional association, a countrywomen's club and a men's choir called “Harmonie”.

== Economy and infrastructure ==
=== Economic structure ===
Agriculture nowadays plays a very subordinate role in Körborn's economy, with many farms having been given up (although a few have grown bigger). Today, the village is a residential community for people of the most varied of occupations. The proximity to Castle Lichtenberg bodes well, as it could afford the municipality opportunities to promote tourism.

=== Education ===
One of the Reformation's effects was to bring the local rulers round to seeing that promoting schooling so that the people could read the Bible for themselves would have its advantages. Thus, they turned their efforts this way. In the latter half of the 16th century, a school was established at Castle Lichtenberg for the children of the Burgfrieden, that is, for Thallichtenberg, Ruthweiler, Körborn, Bistert (a now vanished village near Thallichtenberg) and the Frohnbacher Hof. This first school for the villages around the castle was later only sparsely attended, not least of all because of the long, hard walk to school. During the Thirty Years' War, school ended completely, although classes began again quite early on after the war. In a 1671 Schul-Kinder-Verzeichnuß (“schoolchild directory” in archaic German) compiled by the tax collector at the castle, only four children from Körborn are listed. The collector goes on to say, however: “Hanß Nickel Haas hat 2 Buben, 1 in der Schule, der andere muß bei der Fuhr bleibe. Simon Grimm hat ein Buben, die andern 2 braucht er bei Fuhr und Vieh, können lesen und schreiben. …” (“Hanß Nickel Haas has 2 boys, 1 in the school, the other must stay with the (draught) team. Simon Grimm has 1 boy, the other 2 he needs with the team and the livestock. …”). From 1762, a student teacher is named, Nikolaus Braun, who was from Körborn. Until the beginning of Bavarian times, schoolchildren from Körborn had to attend classes at the castle. Thereafter, they had school more locally, in a private house. Only in the mid 19th century did the village get its own schoolhouse. A new one-room schoolhouse was built in 1936. In the course of school reform about 1970, the village school was dissolved, although at first the schoolhouse itself was still used by primary school pupils, not only from Körborn but also from Dennweiler-Frohnbach and Oberalben. Today, primary pupils attend school in Pfeffelbach, while Hauptschule students go to a Hauptschule in Kusel. The district seat is also the location of other kinds of schools such as Realschule, Gymnasium, vocational schools and special schools.

=== Transport ===
Körborn lies on Kreisstraße 24, which only 2 km from the village ends at Bundesstraße 420 in Kusel’s outlying centre of Diedelkopf. The nearest Autobahn interchange, to Autobahn A 62 (Kaiserslautern–Trier) lies only some 4 km away to the south. Kreisstraße 23 leads from Körborn to Castle Lichtenberg. Serving Kusel, 4 km away, is Kusel station, which is the terminus of the Landstuhl–Kusel railway and is served by Regionalbahn service RB 67, called the Glantalbahn (the name of which refers to the Glan Valley Railway, which shared some of the route of the Landstuhl–Kusel line).
