= Blaubach =

- Municipality
- Coat of arms

- Location of Blaubach within Kusel district
- Interactive map of Blaubach
- Location within Germany Location within Rhineland-Palatinate
- Coordinates: 49°33′27″N 7°23′46″E
- Country: Germany
- State: Rhineland-Palatinate
- District: Kusel
- Municipal assoc.: Kusel-Altenglan

Government
  - Mayor (2019–24): Andreas Lutz

Area
  - Total: 3.13 km^{2} (1.21 sq mi)
- Elevation: 280 m (920 ft)

Population (2025-12-31)
  - Total: 417
  - Density: 133/km^{2} (345/sq mi)
- Time zone: UTC+01:00 (CET)
  - Summer (DST): UTC+02:00 (CEST)
- Postal codes: 66869
- Dialling codes: 06381
- Vehicle registration: KUS
- Website: blaubach.de

Blaubach (German pronunciation: [ˈblaʊbax]) is an Ortsgemeinde – a municipality belonging to a Verbandsgemeinde, a kind of collective municipality – in the Kusel district in Rhineland-Palatinate, Germany. It belongs to the Verbandsgemeinde of Kusel-Altenglan, whose seat is in Kusel. Blaubach is also a state-recognized tourist community.

== Geography ==
=== Location ===
The municipality lies in the Western Palatinate, at elevations from 275 to 290 m above sea level in the valley of the Blaubach, which rises a few kilometres away, northeast of the village near the Mayweilerhof, is also known in its upper reaches as the Dambach, and empties into the Kuselbach south of Blaubach in Kusel's outlying centre of Diedelkopf. Flowing from the west to the Blaubach is the Röhrbach. The broadening of the valley where this stream ends originally favoured the establishment of a settlement. The elevations around the village reach up to 375 m above sea level. The municipal area measures 314 ha, of which 75 ha is wooded.

=== Neighbouring municipalities ===
Blaubach borders in the north on the municipality of Oberalben, in the east on the municipalities of Erdesbach and Altenglan, in the south on the town of Kusel and in the west on the municipality of Körborn.

=== Constituent communities ===
Also belonging to Blaubach are the outlying homesteads of Hotel Reweschnier and Rothengründerhof.

=== Municipality's layout ===
The old village core near where the Röhrbach empties into the Blaubach spread out considerably, bit by bit, first up the dale through which the Röhrbach flows, also up the Blaubach's right bank, and then downstream as well to the mountain slopes (Matzenberg), later spreading, too, to the left bank with extensive new building areas (Am Äckerchen). The old schoolhouse from the 19th century with its gable, belltower and clock on Matzenberg (a street) is held to be a village landmark. This building is today used as a house. A new schoolhouse, now a village community centre, was built between 1958 and 1960. In the older built-up area are found the farmhouses that typify the West Palatinate (Einfirsthaus – literally a house with one roof ridge). On the road going towards Mayweilerhof, one comes first to the renowned Hotel Reweschnier on the brook's left bank, and then to the Rothengründerhof, an Aussiedlerhof (that is, postwar outlying agricultural settlement) that arose in 1957. The graveyard lies south of the village, on the Blaubach's right bank.

== History ==
=== Antiquity ===
In the late 19th century, while a pit was being dug for a new building on Matzenberg, workers stumbled on some potsherds, likely from an urn buried more than 2,000 years earlier by the dale's Celtic inhabitants. Further ceramic vessels – grave goods – were found in recent times while a house was being built on Am Äckerchen (a street). These witnesses to early settlers in the dale have also been joined by further potsherds from Roman times, which were unearthed in the 1950s when the Rothengründerhof was being built. A plot of meadowland near the Rothengründerhof called Gerzenmooch (Götzenbach) might also be a reference to Gallo-Roman settlers, perhaps from the assumption that an idol once stood here near a headwater stream, Götze being a German word that can mean “false god” or “idol”. The lane near Blaubach's municipal area leading from Körborn to Mayweilerhof is to this day called Römerstraße – “Roman Road”.

=== Middle Ages ===
This village, with its small municipal area, might have arisen relatively late. It lay in the so-called Remigiusland, which belonged to the Bishopric of Reims and the Abbey of Saint-Remi in Reims. Consequently, Blaubach had its first documentary mention in the Remigiusberg Monastery's taxation books in 1436, and it was mentioned once more in a 1480 taxation assessment roll from the Amt of Lichtenberg. As early as 1112, Count Gerlach I had, with the founding of the County of Veldenz, among other things, taken over the protection of the Remigiusland, which thenceforth belonged to the Veldenz Oberamt of Lichtenberg. In 1444, Count Palatine Stephan had founded the County Palatine of Zweibrücken, to which the whole County of Veldenz, along with the Oberamt of Lichtenberg, belonged. Listed in the 1480 document was every village in the Oberamt, including Blaubach, which then belonged to the Pfeffelbach Amt or the Diedelkopf Amt (Unteramt). The 1480 roll also gives a clue as to Blaubach's population: it listed four families with roughly 20 people. It is likely, though, that there were others who did not appear on the roll because they paid no taxes (Hintersassen – roughly, “dependent peasants”). Thus, the population might have numbered as high as 40.

=== Modern times ===
In the 16th century, as a result of Martin Luther's Reformation, a new order in religious life came about for the whole Duchy of Palatinate-Zweibrücken, and thereby also for the small village of Blaubach. Worth noting in this era is the rise of fearsome sicknesses, above all, the Plague. In Blaubach, which had so few inhabitants to begin with, 22 persons died in the Plague year 1574 alone; in the Plague year 1597 it was a further 18. Nevertheless, the village did not die right out, for in the years after 1600, roughly two children were being born every year. Perhaps young families had already come and settled in the village. Later Plague epidemics did not affect Blaubach as badly. In the 1588 description of the Oberamt of Lichtenberg by the Zweibrücken official Johannes Hofmann, a description of the village's location also appears, dealing mainly with geographical dimensions.

The worst blow struck against the region's population growth was brought by the Thirty Years' War. In 1635, a cohort of Croatian mercenaries cunningly broke into the town of Kusel. The Landsknechte raped many women, massacred most of the townsfolk and set the whole town on fire. These events likewise drew neighbouring villages into danger, although particulars do not appear in the record. One legend, however, says that the farmers in Blaubach, which lay just across the river from Kusel, wrung all their cocks’ necks so that the Croats would take no notice of the village. Whether or not the people of Blaubach momentarily met with any success in doing this, on the whole, only the odd person in the villages around Kusel survived the onslaught. In the Kusel church book in the war's later years and after the war, hitherto unknown names cropped up – newcomers. It can be concluded from the names appearing in the church book that members of only two families in Blaubach survived the war.

These newcomers revived the village, although King Louis XIV's wars of conquest brought further death and destruction. Blaubach was among those villages described in 1675 as verbrannt – “burnt up”. Nonetheless, that same year, 40 inhabitants were counted. According to a 1717/1718 stock book, there were once again eleven families living in the village. As the 18th century went on, a steady growth in population took hold. It is likely that it was in this time that the well known – at least in Blaubach – legend of the Reweschnier arose (see below under Coat of arms).

==== Recent times ====
In 1793, French Revolutionary troops occupied the land, and in 1801, France annexed the German lands on the Rhine's left bank. Blaubach now belonged to the Mairie (“Mayoralty”) of Kusel and the Canton of Kusel in the Arrondissement of Birkenfeld in the Department of Sarre. In 1816, the Kingdom of Bavaria acquired, under the terms laid out by the Congress of Vienna, the lands on the Rhine's left bank, which were now known as Rheinbaiern (“Rhenish Bavaria”), but later as Bayerische Rheinpfalz (“Bavarian Rhenish Palatinate”). Within the Kingdom of Bavaria, Blaubach belonged to the Bürgermeisterei (“Mayoralty”) of Kusel, the Canton of Kusel and the Landkommissariat (later Bezirksamt and Landkreis – district) of Kusel in the Rheinkreis – yet another name for Bavaria's exclave in the Palatinate. In 1871, the municipality received an endowment from a villager who had emigrated to the United States amounting to more than $1,000, the interest from which was to be paid out to the poor each year. The donation spread some cheer, but because of the formula whereby the money was to be distributed, it was both a boon and a bane, causing considerable disquiet. In the 1933 Reichstag elections, the people of Blaubach voted 70.1% for Adolf Hitler and his Nazi Party (NSDAP). In the course of the 1968 administrative restructuring in Rhineland-Palatinate, Blaubach became in 1972 a self-administering Ortsgemeinde within the Verbandsgemeinde of Kusel. In the time that followed, the village ushered in a considerable upswing through the opening of extensive new building areas. Workers, officials and businesspeople who had jobs in Kusel settled in Blaubach, thus bringing a change in the population structure. As well, the prospects for tourism improved. Blaubach is today said to be a tourist community and (almost) a suburb of the town of Kusel with a good outlook for the future.

=== Population development ===
The breakdown of the inhabitants by occupation had changed fundamentally by 1937. While earlier almost all the villagers earned their livelihood at agriculture, by this time, only about half did. Ever more inhabitants were said to be wage-dependent employees, of whom one in four went to work somewhere outside Blaubach. The village thereby turned from a farming village, as it had once been, to an almost purely residential one. This has brought along with it a lively collaboration in the furthering of a harmonious community and of cultural life, and also made people determined to work towards important goals in the village's development. Population statistics make it clear that until sometime in the 18th century, the village consisted of only a few houses. During the 18th century, and particularly during the 19th century, there was a great upswing in the population, and the population figures doubled over 50 years, and then again in another 80. Against this background, though, between 1816 and 1860, at least officially, 67 inhabitants emigrated to the United States. In the last decade of the 20th century, more than 500 people were living in the village.

The following table shows population development over the centuries for Blaubach, with some figures broken down by religious denomination:

Year	1480	1609	1675	1825	1835	1871	1905	1939	1961	1998	2003
Total	20	47	30	183	225	265	300	313	343	509	506
Catholic	20			–					2
Evangelical		47		181					314
Other									19

=== Municipality's name ===
The name is made up of the word Bach (“brook”) with the word blau (“blue”) prefixed onto it: Blaubach (German pronunciation: [ˈblaʊbax]). Hence, Blaubach would be the settlement on the blue (clean) brook. Within German-speaking Europe are also found other brooks called the Blaubach, which are distinguished (according to writer Ernst Christmann) by having especially clear water. The current form of the name appeared at the village's first documentary mention in 1436 in the Remigiusberg Monastery's taxation books. Other forms of the name that have cropped up are Blawbach (1460), Blaibach (1570/1571) and then once again the current form, Blaubach. Dialectally, the village is called Blääbach or Bloobach.

== Religion ==
Even before the time of the Reformation, the villagers were members of the parish of Kusel. In the time of the Reformation came a general conversion to Martin Luther's teachings, at the behest of the Count Palatine of Zweibrücken and in line with the precept of cuius regio, eius religio. In 1588, Count Palatine (Duke) Johannes I decreed yet another conversion, this time to John Calvin's Reformed teachings. With the greater freedom of movement that came after the Thirty Years' War, the prince-electors once more allowed all denominations, although for Blaubach, the effect was quite little. In 1961, still only 3% of the inhabitants professed Catholicism, while almost 6% had left the church or gave no religion. Today all inhabitants adhering to any of the major denominations belong to the corresponding parishes in the town of Kusel.

== Politics ==
=== Municipal council ===
The council is made up of 8 council members, who were elected by majority vote at the municipal election held on 7 June 2009, and the honorary mayor as chairman.

=== Mayor ===
Blaubach's mayor is Andreas Lutz, and his deputies are Peter Dietrich and Gabriele Jungblut.

=== Coat of arms ===
The German blazon reads: In Blau eine stehende, goldgehörnte und behufte, silberne Ziege.

The municipality's arms might in English heraldic language be described thus: Azure a goat statant argent attired and unguled Or.

As early as 1741, a Blaubach village seal bore a goat. It is, however, unknown what symbolic meaning underlay this seal, but it is likely a reference to the local legend of the roebuck and the stag beetle. According to this legend, a prince-elector demanded of the villagers a roebuck, but instead got a stag beetle, both of these creatures having been known at the time in the local speech as Bock. “Roebuck” in Standard German is actually Rehbock and “stag beetle” is Hirschkäfer (or dialectally, Reweschnier). The arms have been borne since 1983 when they were approved by the now defunct Rheinhessen-Pfalz Regierungsbezirk administration in Neustadt an der Weinstraße.

== Culture and sightseeing ==
=== Buildings ===
The following are listed buildings or sites in Rhineland-Palatinate's Directory of Cultural Monuments:

- Im Röhrbach 10 – Quereinhaus (a combination residential and commercial house divided for these two purposes down the middle, perpendicularly to the street), marked 1769
- Matzenberg 5 – former schoolhouse; sandstone-framed plastered building, 1833/1838, architect Johann Schmeisser, Kusel, upper floor and ridge turret, 1891/1895, architect Regional Master Builder Mergler, one-floor addition 1914

=== Theatre ===
A very lively cultural life marks village life. On the one hand, Blaubach's proximity to the town of Kusel allows the villagers to attend many concerts and plays. On the other, the village's own clubs distinguish themselves in various forms of creativity. Foremost among these is the Blaubacher Dorftheater with its productions by the amateur players, once guided by the late Franz Dietrich, who himself wrote a few plays for the troupe. Blaubach has made a name for itself over the last few years with this troupe of players. News of this amateur troupe's productions of self-written plays from village life and local history has already been broadcast on television. The troupe also stages productions outside the village in places such as the Fritz-Wunderlich-Halle on the Rossberg in Kusel, and twice on the Spanish island of Mallorca. Eight of Franz Dietrich's plays have been produced:

1. Das Schwert ("The Sword")
2. Die Sau-Fehde ("The Sow Feud")
3. Die Witwe mit dem bunten Rock ("The Widow with the Colourful Skirt")
4. Maibaum (“Maypole”)
5. Die Reweschnier ("The Stag Beetle")
6. Der Fürst von Lichtenberg ("The Prince of Lichtenberg")
7. Der Stadtgockel ("The Town Cock")
8. Der Stadtfasel ("The Town Bull")

=== Clubs ===
The sport and game association (Sport- und Spielvereinigung), from which sprang national-level footballer Miroslav Klose, is said to be the village's biggest club. Attached to it as well is a promotional association (Förderverein SG Blaubach-Diedelkopf). Other clubs are: the Countrywomen's Club (Landfrauenverein), the Handicraft Club (Bastelclub), the Singing Circle (Singkreis), the Senior Women's Gymnastic Group (Gruppe des Seniorenturnens der Frauen), the Volunteer Fire Brigade (with an attached Youth Fire Brigade) and the local SPD Association.

=== Regular events ===
In Blaubach, much in the way of old customs has been preserved, and certain people's tireless efforts are to thank for that. The kermis (church consecration festival, locally known as the Blaubacher Kerwe, or Reweschnierkerwe) is held on the second Sunday in August. Along with ceremonial speeches, there is also the long enduring Frühschoppen (roughly “morning pint”) and the custom of stamping out pretzels. The Pfingstquack, too, is still alive in Blaubach. In this Whitsun custom, children and youths go through the village in a group with a bundle of flowers, calling at houses and demanding donations. Also still alive is the custom of raising the Maypole on the eve of May Day, which is also, of course, Walpurgis Night, and “witchcraft” is keenly practised. Another custom that has been revived is the Gemarkungsumgang (“walking round the municipal area”) in which a great number of the local population takes part. At a midday rest along the walk, a field kitchen serves meals.

== Economy and infrastructure ==
=== Economic structure ===
There is an interesting statistic dealing with the development of Blaubach's economic structure, according to which 95% of the population still made their living at agriculture in 1882, while the other 5% were all employed in the village itself or nearby. Only 20% of the then 260 inhabitants were held to be members of the workforce. In 1937, the number of workers still earning their livelihoods at farming had fallen to 40%. Wage-dependent people made up 55% of the workforce, of whom just under 5% had to go more than 30 km to their jobs. Self-employed workers numbered 5%. At that time, of 326 inhabitants, a good 30% practised a profession. By 1975, the farmers’ share of the population had shrunk to 2.5%. More than 93% of the workforce was wage-dependent, and more than 25% had to go more than 30 km to their jobs. The percentage of self-employed workers was then almost 4%, but the actual number of such people had only sunk slightly. Of the 442 inhabitants, 36% were said to practise a profession. Blaubach thus presents itself as a typical rural residential community. There are also independent businesses in the village, roughly 15 of them. Because of efforts to create lodgings and the existing hotel industry, tourism might have a good chance in the future.

=== Transport ===
Blaubach lies on the busy Kreisstraße 22, which only one kilometre down from the village meets Bundesstraße 420. To the south lies the Autobahn A 62 (Kaiserslautern–Trier) with an interchange at Kusel lying about 3 km away. Serving nearby Kusel is Kusel station on the Landstuhl–Kusel railway. There are hourly trains at this station throughout the day, namely Regionalbahn service RB 67 between Kaiserslautern and Kusel, named Glantalbahn after a former railway line that shared a stretch of its tracks with the Landstuhl–Kusel railway.

=== Education ===
In 1703, the Counts Palatine (Dukes) of Zweibrücken introduced general compulsory schooling, and then there was also a school in Blaubach. Before, school had been available in Kusel, although likely little use was made of it. About schooling in Blaubach during the 18th century, Kramer made the following brief notes: “For a while, the municipality had winter school (a school geared towards an agricultural community's practical needs, held in the winter, when farm families had a bit more time to spare) teachers. In 1745, Valentin Rüppel came here. In 1785, Johann Nickel Neu, 33 years old, worked in his home village. In 1792, Keiper taught 27 schoolchildren.” Another schoolteacher from that time was Andreas Braun, who in 1793 mentioned that he had taught in Blaubach for 22 years. Even into the 1920s, the village school board sat each month, assessing individual absences and punishing breaches. Indeed, children often skipped school, because they had to help at home on the farm. A schoolhouse in Blaubach itself was built only in the 19th century, the old schoolhouse on Matzenberg. In the 1960s, the municipality got a new schoolhouse, although it was only actually used as such for a few years. About 1970, the school was dissolved, and ever since, primary school pupils and Hauptschule students have been attending their respective schools in Kusel. The newer schoolhouse in Blaubach became home in 1971 to the school for the mentally handicapped and a special kindergarten (daycare). Both institutions moved to Kusel in 1983. Today, the “new school” serves as the village community centre.

== Famous people ==
=== Famous people associated with the municipality ===
The most famous person associated with Blaubach has been the national-level footballer Miroslav Klose (b. 9 June 1978). Although born in Poland (as Mirosław Marian Kloze), he plays in Germany, and in his youth played for SG Blaubach-Diedelkopf.

Franz Dietrich (b. 29 November 1935 in Wolfstein, d. 19 January 2009 in Blaubach) was a Gymnasium teacher of German and History, first in Andernach, and then from 1964 until his retirement at the Gymnasium in Kusel. He lived in Blaubach and wrote a series of folk plays which, as a rule, were produced by amateur players. Success came with three books of sketches in which people of the Westrich country, an historic region that encompasses areas in both Germany and France, are humorously glossed. Dietrich was also active in local politics, and for some years, he was Blaubach's mayor.
