= Dennweiler-Frohnbach =

- Municipality
- Coat of arms

- Location of Dennweiler-Frohnbach within Kusel district
- Interactive map of Dennweiler-Frohnbach
- Location within Germany Location within Rhineland-Palatinate
- Coordinates: 49°34′42″N 7°23′08″E
- Country: Germany
- State: Rhineland-Palatinate
- District: Kusel
- Municipal assoc.: Kusel-Altenglan

Government
  - Mayor (2019–24): Lothar Helfenstein

Area
  - Total: 6.13 km^{2} (2.37 sq mi)
- Elevation: 340 m (1,120 ft)

Population (2025-12-31)
  - Total: 277
  - Density: 45.2/km^{2} (117/sq mi)
- Time zone: UTC+01:00 (CET)
  - Summer (DST): UTC+02:00 (CEST)
- Postal codes: 66871
- Dialling codes: 06381
- Vehicle registration: KUS

Dennweiler-Frohnbach is an Ortsgemeinde – a municipality belonging to a Verbandsgemeinde, a kind of collective municipality – in the Kusel district in Rhineland-Palatinate, Germany. It belongs to the Verbandsgemeinde of Kusel-Altenglan, whose seat is in Kusel.

The municipality arose from the merger of the two formerly self-administering municipalities of Dennweiler and Frohnbach.

== Geography ==
=== Location ===
The scenic, rural double village is nestled in a low-mountain landscape on the upper river Kuralb, which here bears the name Stegbach, and farther up, the names Stegwiesbach and Feldwiesbach. Towards the east, the Kuralb flows by way of Oberalben to the Totenalb and the Steinalb. The village itself lies in the southern part of a relatively big municipal area at an elevation of some 330 m above sea level. The formerly self-administering village of Dennweiler lies in the northeast of the combined built-up area, while the former village of Frohnbach lies in the southwest. Particularly towards the north, the land climbs steeply up, and heights of more than 500 m above sea level are reached (Hundshübel 430 m, Hohe Buchen 514 m). To the south, towards the so-called Roman road, elevations of only 400 m above sea level are reached within municipal limits. The municipal area measures 613 ha, of which 177 ha is wooded.

=== Neighbouring municipalities ===
Dennweiler-Frohnbach borders in the north on the town of Baumholder, in the east on the municipality of Oberalben and in the southwest on the municipality of Körborn.

=== Municipality's layout ===
The greater part of the village of Dennweiler-Frohnbach stretches along Hauptstraße, its main thoroughfare, Kreisstraße 22. In Dennweiler, Friedhofstraße sprouts off towards the graveyard ("Friedhofstraße" means "Graveyard Street") to the west outside the village. Brunnenweg also branches off to the north. Standing here at this crossroads is the outstandingly embellished village community centre, the Kulturhaus Wadenauer Hof, which is a venue even for events of more than local significance. Friedhofstraße is distinguished by a row of unspoilt Westrich (an historic region that encompasses areas in both Germany and France) farmhouses (Einfirsthäuser, that is, houses with a single roof ridge), which gives a good impression of the former general kind of housebuilding that was undertaken in West Palatine villages. From the crossroads, Hauptstraße winds its way southwards and leads by the original Art Nouveau church from 1906. Nearby stands the kindergarten, housed in the former schoolhouse. The street leads across the Stegbach and turns in the core of Frohnbach once again towards the west, towards the neighbouring village of Körborn. Going out from the bend in the street southwards is where most of Frohnbach's buildings stand. Most are houses, mostly built in their present shape in the late 19th and early 20th centuries. Along the road that extends from this street lies the Frohnbacher Hof, which was laid out in feudal times as a lordly landhold. Since Dennweiler-Frohnbach and Oberalben have a common sport club, the sporting ground in Oberalben is also used by athletes from Dennweiler-Frohnbach. Likewise, the two municipalities have a common fire station.

== History ==
=== Antiquity ===
East of Frohnbach, in the field known as Kappel, a small, Stone Age cutting tool, described as a thumbnail scraper, was found. This archaeological find, just under 2 cm long, is today kept at the museum in Speyer. Standing on the flat knoll of the mountain Hohe Buchen are two still untouched, flat-topped barrows from an unknown time. Roman finds have come to light in places right near the village and somewhat farther away, but thus far, no such thing has cropped up in Dennweiler-Frohnbach itself.

=== Middle Ages ===
Just when the two villages were founded is unknown today. Dennweiler seems to be older than Frohnbach, which itself might have arisen relatively shortly before the first documentary mention, but this is merely speculation. According to the 1355 Grenzscheidweistum (border Weistum, a Weistum – cognate with English wisdom – being a legal pronouncement issued by men learned in law in the Middle Ages and early modern times), Dennweiler and Frohnbach originally belonged to different lordly domains, as the Stegbach – farther downstream called the Kuralb – formed the border of the so-called Remigiusland. The Weistum mentions that the border goes down the brook called the kuralbe. Also worthy of note is that while Frohnbach (Fronenbach in the Weistum), which belonged to the Remigiusland, is clearly mentioned, Dennweiler, which lay on the brook's left bank, is not. The lands there were held by the Bishopric of Verdun as part of their Baumholder holding. This border lost much of its importance in the 12th century when both the Remigiusland and Verdun's Baumholder landhold were taken on by the Counts of Veldenz as a Vogtei. Within the County of Veldenz, Frohnbach belonged to the Amt of Lichtenberg, whereas Dennweiler belonged to the Amt of Baumholder. These relations are believed to have held true at the time when Heinrich I of Veldenz issued a document in 1270 that mentioned Dennweiler and Ruppertsweiler (not the place in the Südwestpfalz district, but rather a nearby, long vanished village) for the first time. This document dealt with a dispute among various Burgmannen, among them Bertram von Wadenau, over holdings and rights in several places that all lay in the Amt of Baumholder. From the document in which Frohnbach had its first documentary mention it can be seen that in 1302, the knight Bertram von Wadenau now wanted to give his estate, named Vronebach, back to the Remigiusberg Monastery, after originally having received it from among the monastery's holdings. Both villages therefore belonged to the County of Veldenz, but lay in different Ämter. In 1444, the County of Veldenz met its end when Count Friederick III of Veldenz died without a male heir. His daughter Anna had wed Stephen, Count Palatine of Simmern-Zweibrücken, who now founded out of his own holdings and his wife's inheritance the County Palantine of Zweibrücken.

=== Modern times ===
Both villages now shared a history with the County Palantine of Zweibrücken until that state was swept away along with all the other feudal states in the events of the French Revolution. In 1570 or 1571, the Zweibrücken official Johannes Schlemmer described the Amt and Gericht (court region) of Baumholder, also mentioning places that were right at the boundary, just outside the Gericht. It says in his writing that Frohnbach (outside the bounds) was directly subject to the Prince (Duke Johannes I), and that Dennweiler (within the bounds) had been granted to the House of Blick von Lichtenberg as a fief. Despite this difference, the two villages had common grazing rights. The villages were very small, with Dennweiler being made up of only eight houses and Frohnbach of only three, of which only two were occupied. Since Ruppertsweiler was not mentioned here, it might well already have vanished. Today's Frohnbacher Hof in the south of the Ortsteil of Frohnbach arose in the late 18th century as a lordly seat for Duke Johannes I. Quite understandably, given their low population figures, both Dennweiler's and Frohnbach's whole populations died in the Thirty Years' War. It can be assumed that other people moved into the two villages after the Thirty Years' War, that French King Louis XIV's wars of conquest brought more destruction and death and that the population only once again began to climb appreciably in the 18th century.

==== Recent times ====
During French Revolutionary and Napoleonic times (1801–1814), the two villages lay within the Department of Sarre, and more locally in the Arrondissement of Birkenfeld, the Canton of Kusel and the Mairie ("Mayoralty") of Ulmet. The two villages now effectively became one, for they now both had the same administrative structure. In Bavarian times, beginning in 1816, Dennweiler-Frohnbach's assignment to the new Bürgermeisterei ("Mayoralty") of Ulmet in the Landkommissariat of Kusel was at first retained, but in 1869, it was assigned to Kusel, both ecclesiastically and politically. During the 19th century, there was a great deal of emigration to the United States, with a few emigrants also leaving for Poland and Brazil. In 1898, three houses were lost in a great fire.

In the early 1930s, the Nazi Party (NSDAP) became quite popular in Dennweiler-Frohnbach. In the 1930 Reichstag elections, 7.7% of the local votes went to Adolf Hitler’s party. By the time of the 1933 Reichstag elections, after Hitler had already seized power, local support for the Nazis had swollen to 82.4%. Hitler's success in these elections paved the way for his Enabling Act of 1933 (Ermächtigungsgesetz), thus starting the Third Reich in earnest.

Since 1972, the municipality has belonged to the then newly founded Verbandsgemeinde of Kusel.

=== Population development ===
According to the 1609 church visitation protocol of the Oberamt of Lichtenberg, only a few families lived in the village, earning their livelihoods as farmers and woodsmen. Since the late 19th century, other occupations have come to the fore, and agriculture now only plays a minor role. Most workers, who work at various occupations, must nowadays seek a living outside the village, commuting to work. Not to be overlooked are those whose lives are dedicated to special cultural commitments, and those with strong commitments to conservation. With regard to religion, the great majority of Dennweiler-Frohnbach's inhabitants are Evangelical. Population figures rose quickly after the turn of the 18th century, and about the turn of the 19th century, the population peaked at somewhat more than 400 inhabitants. Currently, though, the figure is stalled at a level of about 330. The village's proximity to the town of Kusel has clearly prevented a fall in population.

The following table shows population development over the centuries for Dennweiler-Frohnbach, with some figures broken down by religious denomination:

Year	1825	1835	1871	1905	1939	1961	1994	2005
Total	320	385	408	405	334	351	330	332
Catholic	9					14
Evangelical	311					337

=== Municipality's name ===
Dennweiler's name first appears as Dennewilre in the 1270 Heinrichurkunde (the document issued by Heinrich I of Veldenz mentioned above). Later forms showed hardly any changes from this first documentary mention. In 1570, the modern spelling, "Dennweiler", cropped up for the first time. The name goes back to a Frankish settlement and a man named "Danno", while the ending —weiler is German for "hamlet" (originally "homestead"). Thus, the name originally meant "Danno’s homestead". The folk interpretation that the name springs from a form such as Tannenweiler ("Fir Tree Hamlet"), however, may be put down to folk etymology. Nevertheless, a fir tree is the main charge in the municipality's coat of arms. Frohnbach's name first came to light in 1302 as curia Vronebach in a document from the Remigiusberg Monastery. The name also appeared as Fronenbach (1457 and 1490). The word fron meant "belonging to the lord". This word element still appears in German in Frondienst (compulsory labour, originally for a lord) and Fronleichnam (literally "dead body belonging to the Lord", and thus meaning "Corpus Christi"); the word Fron by itself even still exists, although now it is a noun meaning "drudgery". What the Fron— element may mean here is that the village might have first arisen as a lordly estate (another such estate arose in the 18th century, the Frohnbacher Hof). The placename ending —bach is German for "brook".

=== Vanished villages ===
A village named Ruppertsweiler – not to be confused with Ruppertsweiler just east of Pirmasens, which has not vanished – first mentioned in 1270 as Ruprehtiswilre in a document issued by Count Heinrich of Veldenz and Geroldseck (the same as the one mentioned just above), lay northwest of Dennweiler on the road that went from Lichtenberg towards Baumholder. According to the description of the Amt of Lichtenberg by Johannes Hofmann, this village no longer existed by 1588. Another village, named Auersbach (on the like-named brook) supposedly once lay near Dennweiler-Frohnbach's northern limit. Unknown is any information about the village's exact location or any documentary mentions. If it even ever existed, it might well have lain within Baumholder's current limits.

== Religion ==
The village of Dennweiler belonged from the time of its founding onwards among lands held by the Bishopric of Verdun around the market town of Baumholder, whereas Frohnbach belonged to the Remigiusland held by the Abbey of Saint-Remi in Reims. This territorial relationship, though, had no bearing on the ecclesiastical relationship, with both villages being grouped into the Archbishopric of Mainz. On a more local level, they may well have belonged throughout the Middle Ages, and even after the Reformation until the time of the French Revolution to the Church of Baumholder. There are clues in rural cadastral toponyms and in passing references in written records to the existence during the Middle Ages of a chapel that stood somewhere between Dennweiler and Oberalben, but it seems to have fallen into disrepair in the time of the Reformation. The Reformation was introduced here, as it was throughout the Amt of Baumholder, beginning in 1523, at first according to Martin Luther’s teachings, but as of 1588 according to John Calvin’s. From the beginning of Bavarian times, about 1816, the now united double village of Dennweiler-Frohnbach belonged to the parish of Flurskappeln (Ulmet). As the worshippers had to undertake such a long, arduous trip to and from the church, calls for the village to have its own church became ever louder. This only came to be in the early 20th century. Decades before this, vicars lodging in the village, and changing often, had been holding church services at the schoolhouse. Dennweiler-Frohnbach got its own parish in 1914, to which, as of 1920, the neighbouring village of Oberalben also belonged. In 1973, the church administration, as part of an extensive reorganization, dissolved the parish owing to declining attendance and because transport links were now better. Ever since, Dennweiler-Frohnbach's Evangelical Christians have belonged to Pfarramt 3 of the church community of Kusel. The number of Catholics in the village has always been quite small, and they nowadays belong to the Catholic church community in Kusel. Moreover, there are more than 30 people living in the village who profess no religious belief, or who will not reveal their beliefs.

== Politics ==
=== Municipal council ===
The council is made up of 6 council members, who were elected by majority vote at the municipal election held on 7 June 2009, and the honorary mayor as chairman.

=== Mayor ===
Dennweiler-Frohnbach's mayor is Lothar Helfenstein.

=== Coat of arms ===
The German blazon reads: In Silber über zwei grünen Balken, belegt mit fünf silbernen Kugeln 3:2, eine bewurzelte, grüne Tanne.

The municipality's arms might in English heraldic language be described thus: Argent in base two closets vert charged with five roundels of the field, three and two, above which a fir tree eradicated of the second.

The local feudal lords in this area were the Knights of Wadenau. They bore arms with the two closets (narrow horizontal stripes) charged with five roundels, as seen in the base of the municipality's coat of arms. The knights’ castle stood near Frohnbach. Also added to the merged municipality's arms was Dennweiler's old municipal seal, which showed a fir tree standing for the municipality's wealth of woodland.

The arms have been borne since 15 August 1983 when they were approved by the now defunct Rheinhessen-Pfalz Regierungsbezirk administration in Neustadt an der Weinstraße.

== Culture and sightseeing ==
=== Buildings ===
The following are listed buildings or sites in Rhineland-Palatinate’s Directory of Cultural Monuments:

- Protestant parish church, Hauptstraße 29 – houselike sandstone-framed plastered building on rusticated base, belltower, 1906, architect Building Office Assessor Dünnbier, Kaiserslautern
- At Frohnbacher Hof 9 – stone oven pedestal, about 1805

=== Cultural life ===
Even with merely sporadic cultural events at the Wadenauer Hof (the community centre), measured against the very small population figure, Dennweiler-Frohnbach actually has a considerable cultural life. Also found here is active creative art, embodied for instance by singer-songwriter Ferdinand Ledwig, who goes by the professional name "Ferdinand der Sänger" ("Ferdinand the Singer"). Further cultural promoters here are the village's clubs (see below).

=== Regular events ===
Customs practised in the village are the usual ones for the Western Palatinate, for instance the Neujahrsschießen ("New Year’s Shooting") and the children's Spendenheischen ("Donation Begging"). Loved by the village's youth is Witches’ Night (Hexennacht, actually Walpurgis Night) with its raising of the Maypole and its springtime merrymaking on the eve of May Day. The children also enjoy a Western Palatine custom known as the Pfingstquack, observed at Whitsun (Pfingsten in German); the —quack part of the custom's name refers to a rhyme that the children recite as they go door to door begging for money with their gorse-decked wagon. The rhyme generally begins with the line "Quack, Quack, Quack". There are also a kermis (church consecration festival, locally known as the Kerwe) held on the second weekend in October, and a parade on Martinmas (11 November).

=== Clubs ===
The following clubs exist (or once existed) in Dennweiler-Frohnbach (founding year in parentheses): Dennweiler-Frohnbach/Oberalben sport club (1969); Social Democratic Party of Germany Dennweiler-Körborn-Oberalben local association (1984); volunteer fire brigade (1890); 1.FCK "Harter Kern" fan club (1979); "Liederkranz" Dennweiler-Frohnbach singing club (1894); warriors’ (veterans’) club (1889–1944); countrywomen's club (1986); Naturschutzbund Deutschland Kusel and Altenglan local association (1981, with many active members in Dennweiler-Frohnbach).

== Economy and infrastructure ==
=== Economic structure ===
The merged municipality of Dennweiler-Frohnbach was once characterized mainly by its agricultural activity, although there were also the attendant craft occupations. The land is still worked even today, but farming no longer has its former importance. Today Dennweiler-Frohnbach is mainly a bedroom community for people in the most varied of occupations. Among the more unusual jobs done by villagers, according to writer Zenglein, writing in 1994, are horse trainer, inland navigator, musician and actor. Zenglein furthermore asserts that although there is not a single employer in Dennweiler-Frohnbach itself, the number of jobless in the village may well be far below the national average. Tourism is foreseen to offer good opportunities in the years to come.

=== Public institutions ===
On hand in Dennweiler-Frohnbach are a kindergarten and a village community and cultural centre.

=== Education ===
It is known from records that there was a winter school (a school geared towards an agricultural community's practical needs, held in the winter, when farm families had a bit more time to spare) in Dennweiler and Frohnbach in the winter of 1743–1744, although the teacher, whose name was Johann Scherp, taught classes at his home. Winter school teachers, though, who were not well trained, changed often. Usually, the teacher lived in Frohnbach. In 1758, when a teacher from Frohnbach wanted to move to Dennweiler, it led to such a fierce dispute in the villages that it could only be allayed by the government's intervention. The common school service for both villages, and for a time it also included Oberalben, had to be enforced time and again by the government. Dennweiler-Frohnbach only got its own permanent schoolhouse in 1831. The schoolhouse and the teacher's dwelling were repeatedly remodelled. All 19th- and 20th-century teachers’ names are known. In 1969, the school was dissolved, and what followed was a merger with the school in the neighbouring village of Oberalben. After a conversion, the kindergarten moved into the old schoolhouse in 1976. Dennweiler-Frohnbach's primary school pupils and Hauptschule students nowadays attend the corresponding schools in Kusel. The district seat is also the location of higher schools and special schools.

=== Transport ===
Dennweiler-Frohnbach lies on Kreisstraße (District Road) 23, which branches off Landesstraße 176 near Thallichtenberg, running by way of Körborn, Dennweiler-Frohnbach and Oberalben and linking near the Mayweilerhof to Kreisstraße 22. Over that road, it is roughly six kilometres to Bundesstraße 420, and the direct route to Kusel by way of Körborn is only 5 km. The nearest Autobahn interchange, on the A 62 (Kaiserslautern–Trier), near Konken to the south, is roughly 10 km away.

Serving nearby Kusel is Kusel station on the Landstuhl–Kusel railway. There are hourly trains at this station throughout the day, namely Regionalbahn service RB 67 between Kaiserslautern and Kusel, named Glantalbahn after a former railway line that shared a stretch of its tracks with the Landstuhl–Kusel railway.
