= Thallichtenberg =

- Municipality
- Coat of arms

- Location of Thallichtenberg within Kusel district
- Interactive map of Thallichtenberg
- Location within Germany Location within Rhineland-Palatinate
- Coordinates: 49°33′28″N 7°21′05″E
- Country: Germany
- State: Rhineland-Palatinate
- District: Kusel
- Municipal assoc.: Kusel-Altenglan

Government
  - Mayor (2019–24): Annika Süssel

Area
  - Total: 5.72 km^{2} (2.21 sq mi)
- Elevation: 287 m (942 ft)

Population (2025-12-31)
  - Total: 515
  - Density: 90.0/km^{2} (233/sq mi)
- Time zone: UTC+01:00 (CET)
  - Summer (DST): UTC+02:00 (CEST)
- Postal codes: 66871
- Dialling codes: 06381
- Vehicle registration: KUS

Thallichtenberg is an Ortsgemeinde – a municipality belonging to a Verbandsgemeinde, a kind of collective municipality – in the Kusel district in Rhineland-Palatinate, Germany. It belongs to the Verbandsgemeinde of Kusel-Altenglan, whose seat is in Kusel.

== Geography ==
=== Location ===
The municipality lies in the Kusel Musikantenland in the Western Palatinate. The municipal area measures 571 ha, of which 163 ha is wooded. Thallichtenberg lies roughly 300 m above sea level northwest of Lichtenberg Castle (382 m above sea level) in a broad hollow between the Burgberg (“Castle Mountain”) and the so-called Prussian Mountains (Preußische Berge), which here, on the heights of the Wolfsbösch, reach 572 m above sea level. Down in the dale, the village site abuts the Pfeffelbach (brook), which here turns from its south-to-north direction of flow towards the east, forming a narrow gorge between the Burgberg and the Niederberg within Ruthweiler’s limits. Several small brooks (Löschbach, Bisterbach, Kurzer Bach) flow into the Pfeffelbach within Thallichtenberg.

=== Neighbouring municipalities ===
Thallichtenberg borders in the north on the town of Baumholder, in the northeast and east on the municipality of Körborn, in the southeast on the municipality of Ruthweiler, in the south on the municipality of Pfeffelbach, in the west on the municipality of Berschweiler bei Baumholder and in the northwest on the municipality of Mettweiler.

=== Constituent communities ===
Also belonging to Thallichtenberg are the outlying homesteads of Burg Lichtenberg and Berghof.

=== Municipality’s layout ===
The village of Thallichtenberg shows the attributes of a typical clump village, with streets spreading out in a starlike shape from the midpoint into the dales through which the smaller brooks flow and over the heights in between. The road leading to the castle branches off from the village thoroughfare at the village's southern end. About halfway up, on both sides of the road, lies the graveyard. The former Jewish graveyard, which now stands under monumental protection, can be found in the municipality's northwest near the sporting ground. New building areas have been laid out mainly in the north. On the heights far out of the village, below the Wolfsbösch and near the Breitsesterhof, which belongs to Baumholder, lies the Berghof, one of Thallichtenberg's outlying homesteads.

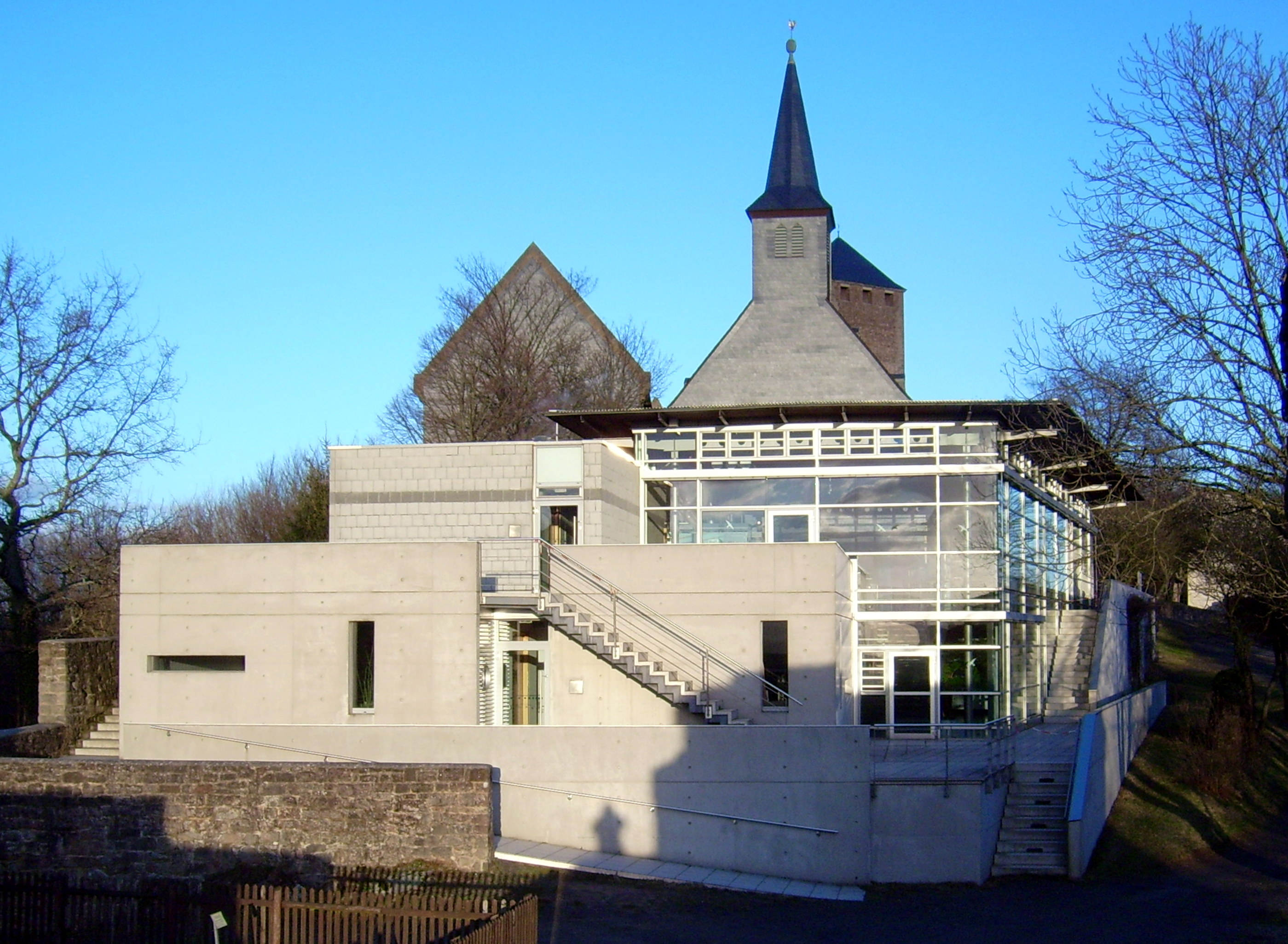
Geoskop at Lichtenberg Castle

Institutions of national importance are housed within the old castle complex, the Musikantenlandmuseum, for instance, which deals with the history of travelling musicians from this region, and also the Geoskop (museum of primitive times), a branch location of the Bad Dürkheim Palatine Museum (Pfalzmuseum Bad Dürkheim). Also found at Lichtenberg Castle are the Evangelical church for the villages of Thallichtenberg and Ruthweiler, the youth hostel, the herb garden, a well visited inn with a nice view and a registry office. The castle complex, with a length of 425 m, is one of Germany's biggest. Areas in both the Palatinate and the Saarland can be seen from the top of the keep.

== History ==
=== Antiquity ===
In the late New Stone Age, nomads were found in the area around what is now Thallichtenberg, as archaeological finds from neighbouring places bear witness. The immediate area, though, was quite heavily settled in Gallo-Roman times. An article by Daniel Hinkelmann in the first postwar edition of the Westricher Heimatblätter was headlined “Three Roman Estates in the Thallichtenberg Municipal Area” (Drei römische Gutshöfe auf der Gemarkung Thallichtenberg). A Roman bathing facility had already been unearthed about the middle of the 18th century in the municipality. Pictures of this were published in Strasbourg in 1751 by the magazine Alsatia illustrata. This bathing facility had likely been part of a Gallo-Roman estate, a villa rustica. Another villa rustica was discovered in 1964 by a farmer who was ploughing. It was unearthed in 1967 under the leadership of the archaeologist Wolfgang Binsfeld from Trier by Daniel Hinkelmann and Karlheinz Schultheiß in collaboration with members of the Lichtenberg Castle Local History Club (Heimatverein “Burg Lichtenberg”). An even bigger Gallo-Roman complex was discovered by the local historian soon afterwards not far from this last one. This one was excavated in 1970, with Dr. Binsfeld once again overseeing the work, and was precisely documented and later filled in again.

=== Middle Ages ===
The village of Thallichtenberg might have been founded only once the castle was built in the early 13th century. Thallichtenberg, and also a number of villages that have since vanished, only appear in documents dating from after the castle's completion. It would therefore seem that a number of places sprang up in the area around Lichtenberg Castle, of which Thallichtenberg is the only one that still exists. The village of Ruthweiler at the foot of the castle, though, was likely already standing at the time when work on the castle began. At the first documentary mention of Lichtenberg as Castrum Lichtenberg in 1214, only Lichtenberg Castle is mentioned, and no village named Lichtenberg. When the Counts of Veldenz were appointed as Vögte over the so-called Remigiusland as far back as the early 12th century, they began, unlawfully, to build a castle in this domain that belonged to the Abbey of Saint-Remi in Reims, a move the abbot contested by registering a protest with Holy Roman Emperor Frederick II. The actual protest document is lost to history; however, a text of the Emperor's ruling on the matter, handed down in Basel in 1214, has survived. In part, this reads: “… quod nos auctoritate regia castrum Lichtenberg, quod comes de Veldenzen in allodio Sancti Remigii Remensis, … violenter et iniuxte construxit, juste destruere debeamus.” (“By our kingly authority, we are forced to lawfully tear down Castle Lichtenberg, which the Count of Veldenz has forcibly and wrongfully built on Saint Remigius’s property.”). The Count of Veldenz in this case was Gerlach IV, and he did not bow to the Emperor's ruling, and hence, the castle remained standing. Lichtenberg Castle is actually made up of two castles, the Oberburg (“Upper Castle”) and the Unterburg (“Lower Castle”). The Upper Castle with its three palatial halls and tall keep was reserved as the lordly living quarters, while the Lower Castle was where the Burgmannen and their families lived. Only later were other buildings built between the two castles, thus making the two separate complexes into one. The Counts of Veldenz (1112-1444), as lords of the castle, actually lived in Meisenheim, but they presented their claim to power in the mighty castle complex. The castle was even then held to be the administrative seat of the Amt of Lichtenberg. The most important mediaeval Burgmannen at Lichtenberg Castle were the family Blicke von Lichtenberg (1343-1788), the family Gauer (1285-1450), the family Sötern (1376-1483), the family Ballwein (1402-1677), the family Genge (1328-1356), the family Finchel (1300-1374), the family Winterbecher (1409-1446) and the family Raubesak (1270-~1400). In 1444, the County of Veldenz met its end when Count Friedrich III of Veldenz died without a male heir. His daughter Anna wed King Ruprecht's son Count Palatine Stephan. By uniting his own Palatine holdings with the now otherwise heirless County of Veldenz – his wife had inherited the county, but not her father's title – and by redeeming the hitherto pledged County of Zweibrücken, Stephan founded a new County Palatine, as whose comital residence he chose the town of Zweibrücken: the County Palatine – later Duchy – of Palatinate-Zweibrücken. From 1444 on, Frutzweiler thus lay in the Duchy of Palatinate-Zweibrücken.

=== Modern times ===
From Zweibrücken times it is clear that only the part of Thallichtenberg that lay on the brook's left bank was counted as one of the villages within the Burgfrieden (the castle's sovereign area). It was also then that grand, lordly buildings sprang up within the castle limits, especially at the Upper Castle, spreading out from the core of the castle all round the keep: South Palace, East Palace, West Palace together with the obligatory fortifications. On the unprotected south side arose a broad bailey ringed with a high outer wall with a battlement parapet. At the beginning of the Thirty Years' War, craftsmen and farmers from the castle area built, shortly before Spanish troops advanced in 1620, the so-called Hufeisenturm (“Horseshoe Tower”) with particularly thick walls that were supposed to stand up even to cannon balls. The castle's entrance was secured by three nested gates. During the expansion work in the open area between the Upper Castle and the Lower Castle, the mighty tithe barn arose, along with a new castle church, extensive administration buildings along the castle road and beside the Kellerei (“stewardship”, in fact the tithe barn) more buildings for the Amtmann and the scrivener. While only a few of the inhabitants down below in the dale on the brook's right bank were the Burgmannen’s serfs, those living within the Burgfrieden continually had to perform compulsory labour for the lordship at the castle. The serfs complained about this and managed to have their compulsory labour duties precisely regulated. This happened in a time when French Revolutionary troops were already advancing on the lands around the castle. Lichtenberg Castle was never actually conquered by foreign troops, not even in the Thirty Years’ War. Nevertheless, during both King Louis XIV's wars and the French Revolutionary Wars, the castle accommodated French troops. In 1758, the Oberamt administration moved to new offices on Landschaftsstraße in Kusel.

==== Recent times ====
In 1799, there was a great fire at Lichtenberg Castle that burnt most of the buildings, after which – as before the blaze – the castle was subject to plundering. Thallichtenberg and the castle belonged at the time of French annexation beginning in 1801 to the Mairie (“Mayoralty”) of Burglichtenberg, the Department of Sarre, the Arrondissement of Birkenfeld and the Canton of Kusel. The French authorities declared the castle national property. Bit by bit, buildings were auctioned off, walls torn down and stones from the whole area sold as building materials. The first craftsmen were then already settling on the castle domain. At the same time, the now once again inhabited complex became the seat of the Mairie of Château Lichtenberg, to which the following villages belonged: Lichtenberg la vallée (Thallichtenberg), Routweiler, Pfeffelbach, Reichweiler, Schwarzerden, Albessen and Herchweiler (some of these names were Gallicized). After French troops withdrew in 1814, there was yet again a reorganization of territories by an administration commission and the Congress of Vienna. In 1816, the Principality of Lichtenberg, a newly created exclave of the Duchy of Saxe-Coburg-Saalfeld (which as of 1826 became the Duchy of Saxe-Coburg and Gotha) came into being, comprising the cantons of Sankt Wendel, Baumholder and Grumbach. These cantons were split into Bürgermeisterämter (“mayoral offices”). One of these was called Burglichtenberg (a fusion of the German name for Lichtenberg Castle, Burg Lichtenberg), to which belonged the villages of Thallichtenberg, Ruthweiler, Pfeffelbach, Reichweiler and Schwarzerden. This Amt was merged in 1821 with its neighbour, the Amt of Berschweiler. The resulting bigger Amt retained the name Burglichtenberg, but its seat was at Berschweiler. Also belonging to the Amt were the villages of Berglangenbach, Eckersweiler, Fohren-Linden, Hahnweiler, Leitzweiler, Rohrbach and Rückweiler. In the meantime, living in the village within the castle complex were about 100 inhabitants. The village became self-administering in 1831. The settlers there were cutlers and nailers who travelled about to sell their wares. The best known of these nailers was Christian Forsch, whose secondary occupation was local poet. In 1834, Saxe-Coburg sold the principality on the Rhine’s left bank to the Kingdom of Prussia at first for an annuity of 80,000 Thaler. Thallichtenberg and Burglichtenberg now became part of Prussia’s Rhine Province, in the Sankt Wendel district, which was divided into the Amtsbezirke of Sankt Wendel, Baumholder, Burglichtenberg (seat at Berschweiler) and Grumbach. The Amt of Burglichtenberg existed until 1963. In 1894, the Prussian state bought the Upper Castle from its private owners and placed the castle complexes under monumental protection. The first safety and reconstruction repair work began. In 1910, the village of Burglichtenberg lost its self-administration and was amalgamated with Thallichtenberg. The road to the castle was paved with tar in 1922 so that it could now also be reached by car. That same year, a youth hostel opened at the castle site, and is still quite popular today. Later, after the First World War, the Treaty of Versailles stipulated, among other things, that 26 of the Sankt Wendel district’s 94 municipalities, including the namesake district seat, had to be ceded to the British- and French-occupied Saar, a newly created entity. The remaining 68 municipalities in the Ämter of Baumholder, Burglichtenberg and Grumbach then bore the designation “Restkreis St. Wendel-Baumholder”, with the first syllable of Restkreis having the same meaning as in English, in the sense of “left over”. In 1935, after a referendum on the question, the Saar, now known as the “Saarland”, chose to rejoin Germany where, by this time, Adolf Hitler and the Nazis had taken over and established the Third Reich. Political arrangements did not return to what they were before the Treaty of Versailles. Instead, the Restkreis Baumholder united in 1937 with the former Oldenburg territory around Birkenfeld and Idar-Oberstein, which had also remained with Germany, to form the new Prussian district of Birkenfeld. Through administrative reform in 1969, the so-called Unterberggemeinden (roughly “municipalities at the foot of the mountain”) in this district, namely Ruthweiler, Pfeffelbach, Reichweiler and Thallichtenberg with Lichtenberg Castle, were transferred from the Birkenfeld district to the Kusel district. The development of the castle complexes, which the Birkenfeld district had already begun undertaking after the Second World War, experienced continued work under the Kusel district's administration.

=== Population development ===
Until the French Revolution, the castle itself defined life for the villages in the castle domain, including Thallichtenberg. At the castle lived not only servants of the most varied kinds but also Oberamt officials. Many of these feudal castle dwellers’ family names can still be found today in the region around the castle. For its part, the village of Thallichtenberg was characterized by agriculture, though already in the 18th and 19th centuries, men were working in mines and quarries in the area. Only a few villagers work the land nowadays. Tourism is now a growing industry. First and foremost, Thallichtenberg today is a residential community for people from all walks of life, most of whom earn their livelihoods outside the village. According to a 1609 Oberamt of Lichtenberg church Visitation protocol, 111 people lived in the dale (Thallichtenberg) and 61 at the castle. It is not known how many people survived the Thirty Years' War; it would not have been many. Since the castle itself was never overrun by invaders, it might have offered more security. It could therefore be that more people survived here than down in the dale. The population only began building again in the 18th century, and the trend held until the early 20th century, when the people living at the castle were also no longer counted separately. After a temporary fall in the population about 1960, a new rise set in towards the end of the century. Such fluctuations did not characterize population development at the castle itself. Throughout feudal times, the figure was always about 60, and in the “nailers’ times”, always about 80. Today some 10 people live permanently at the castle.

The following table shows population development over the centuries for Thallichtenberg. Separate figures are shown for “Thal” (Thallichtenberg) and “Burg” (castle). Since 1960, however, castle dwellers have not been counted separately, and figures for the municipality as a whole are given under “Thal”; there have been about 10 dwellers at the castle (included in the “Thal” total) in recent times:

Year	1609	1648	1819	1843	1861	1895	1926	1960	2000	2007	2008
Thal	111	–	334	402	469	532	683	632	681	662	621
Burg	61	?	?	60	8	83	78	~10	~10	~10	~10

=== Municipality’s name ===
The village's name, Thallichtenberg, has its origin in the castle's name, Lichtenberg. This fortification was held to be a castle on a light (in colour, that is) mountain, or Burg auf dem lichten Berg in German. Of course, the slopes beneath the castle were cleared. Thallichtenberg, therefore, was held to be the settlement in the dale (Tal, or archaically Thal; this latter spelling is preserved in “Thallichtenberg”) below the light mountain. Throughout German-speaking Europe, some 20 castles with the name “Lichtenberg” are known. The castle's name first appears in documents in 1214. One from 1377 says “in dem Dayle zu Lichtenberg”, and one from 1480 “im Dale zu Liechtinberg” (both these examples show forms of Tal rather more similar to the word's English cognate). Another document in 1445 read “zu Dalen”, and indeed, it is still customary nowadays to refer to Thallichtenberg as de Dal in the local speech. The distinction between Thallichtenberg and Burglichtenberg became necessary once a new village had arisen within the castle ruins in the 19th century, and then also because for a long while, the seat of a Prussian Amtsbezirk was there.

=== Vanished villages ===
Within what are today Thallichtenberg's municipal limits once lay a whole series of villages, most of which vanished even before the Thirty Years' War. In 1371, a village named Berweiler (Berwilre) was mentioned, which was described in 1588 by Johannes Hoffmann as “ehemalige Dorfstadt” (“former village-town”); it might have lain west of Thallichtenberg. To Thallichtenberg's north lay Bistert, likely in the area of the road that today leads to Baumholder. This village had its first documentary mention as early as 1270, then bearing the name Pistereit, and was mentioned again in a 1580 Burgfrieden ordinance, as well as in Johannes Hoffmann's 1588 description. Most likely, this village fell during the Thirty Years' War (1618-1648). Altpeter also names the vanished villages of Friedberg and Steinbach, which are not listed in Dolch's and Greule's Historisches Siedlungsnamenbuch (“Historical Settlement Name Book”). Also to the north, near the Kurzenbach (brook) lay Stolzenhausen, which was mentioned in 1347 as Stolbeshußen. This village, too, had vanished by 1588. Quite likely to have lain right near Stolzenhausen was another now long vanished village, Wadenau, which was mentioned in the same 1270 document as Bistert. Indeed, the name Wadenau appeared quite often in documents from the Counts of Veldenz; it was so nearby that knights from the castle long made it their residence. Lastly, there was a village called Warneshoben that cropped up in documents about 1300. This probably lay to Thallichtenberg's southwest.

== Religion ==
Throughout feudal times, the villagers of Thallichtenberg attended the churches at Lichtenberg Castle, during the Middle Ages and early modern times Saint George's Chapel (St. Georgskapelle) and as of 1758, the then newly built church near the tithe barn. Duke Ludwig II, who died in 1532, was already a friend of the Reformation, which in 1536, under Ludwig's brother Ruprecht, then acting for the underaged Duke Wolfgang, was introduced into the Duchy of Palatinate-Zweibrücken and made binding on all its subjects. During the time of the Reformation, the reformer Ulrich Zwingli twice stayed at the castle, once on the way to the 1529 Marburg Colloquy and again on the way back home to Zurich. In 1588, all the duchy's subjects had to convert once again when Duke Johannes I introduced Calvinism. After the Thirty Years' War, the odd Lutheran or Catholic settled in the village. Because Thallichtenberg and Burglichtenberg lay in the Principality of Lichtenberg, which was part of the Duchy of Saxe-Coburg-Saalfeld, and later in Prussia's Rhine Province, the Evangelical Christians in the village today belong to the Evangelical Church in the Rhineland. In 1818, the Duke of Saxe-Coburg brought about the merger of the two Reformed denominations, and the resolution of an 1820 synod in Baumholder in turn brought about the “full unification” of these two denominations. In Prussian times, after 1834, the church district of Sankt Wendel came into being within the Rhenish Church. Fundamentally, this organizational scheme persists to this day. The first graveyard for the whole Burgfrieden was laid out in 1750. The village's Roman Catholic Christians, in line with their historical development, belong to the deaconry of Kusel. During the 18th century, Jews also settled in Thallichtenberg, earning their livelihoods from trade and crafts. Buried at the Thallichtenberg Jewish graveyard, which nowadays stands under monumental protection, were Jews from the villages in the castle area and also from the town of Kusel.

== Politics ==
=== Municipal council ===
The council is made up of 12 council members, who were elected by majority vote at the municipal election held on 7 June 2009, and the honorary mayor as chairwoman.

=== Mayor ===
Thallichtenberg's mayor is Annika Süssel.

=== Coat of arms ===
The German blazon reads: In geteiltem Schild oben in Silber ein wachsender, rotbewehrter und -bezungter, blauer Löwe, unten von Grün und Silber dreifach geteilt, auf den grünen Balken fünf silberne Kugeln 3:2.

The municipality's arms might in English heraldic language be described thus: Per fess argent a demilion azure armed and langued gules and barry of four vert and argent, the bars charged with five roundels of the first, three and two.

The charge in the escutcheon’s upper field, the demilion, is the heraldic device once borne by the Counts of Veldenz, the local rulers until 1444. The roundels, called Kugeln in German, suggesting a spherical shape (whereas the English term “roundels” suggests a flat shape), appear in several coats of arms once borne by Burgmannen at Lichtenberg Castle.

The arms have been borne since 1963 when they were approved by the Rhineland-Palatinate Ministry of the Interior.

== Culture and sightseeing ==
=== Buildings ===
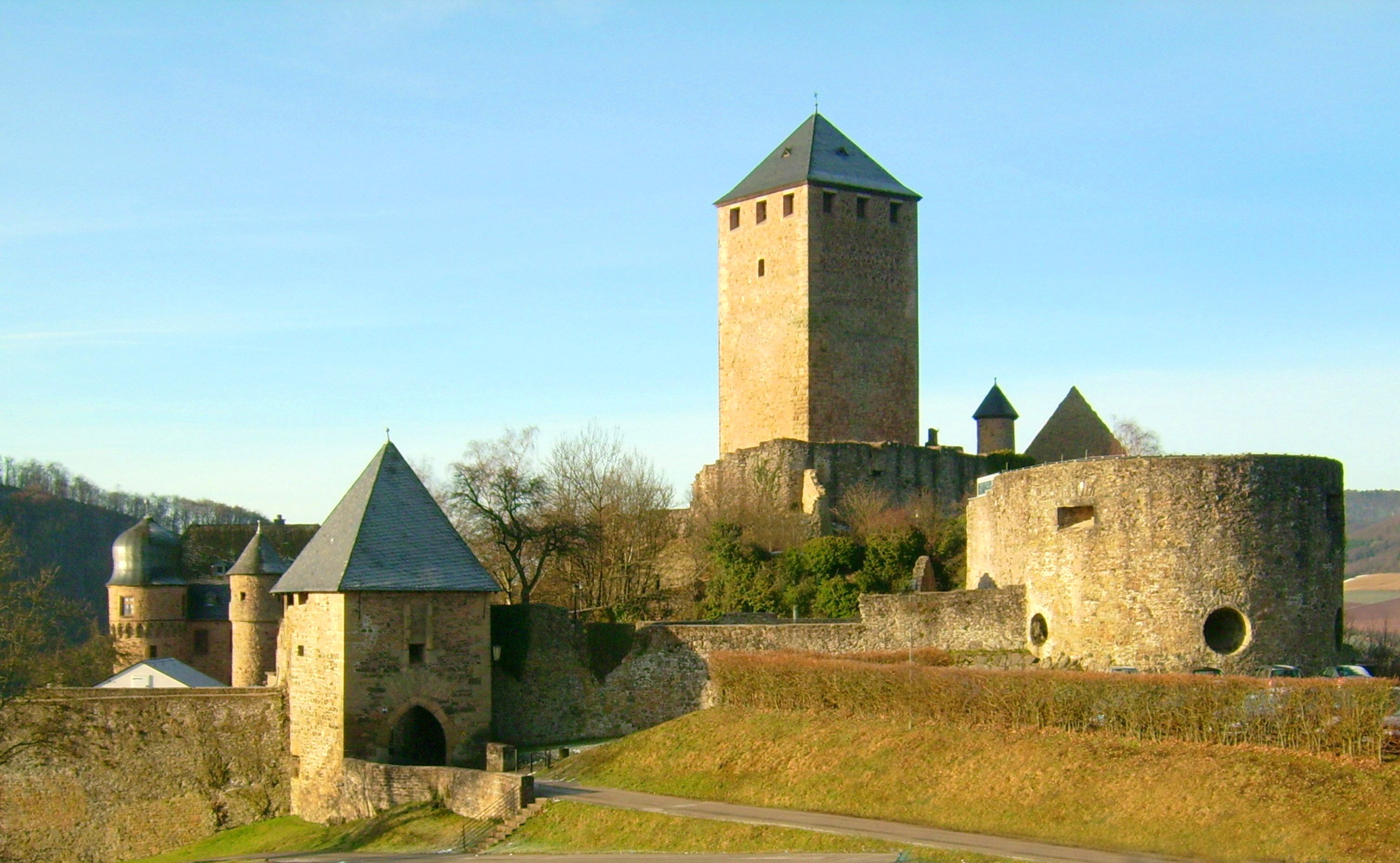
Lichtenberg Castle monumental zone

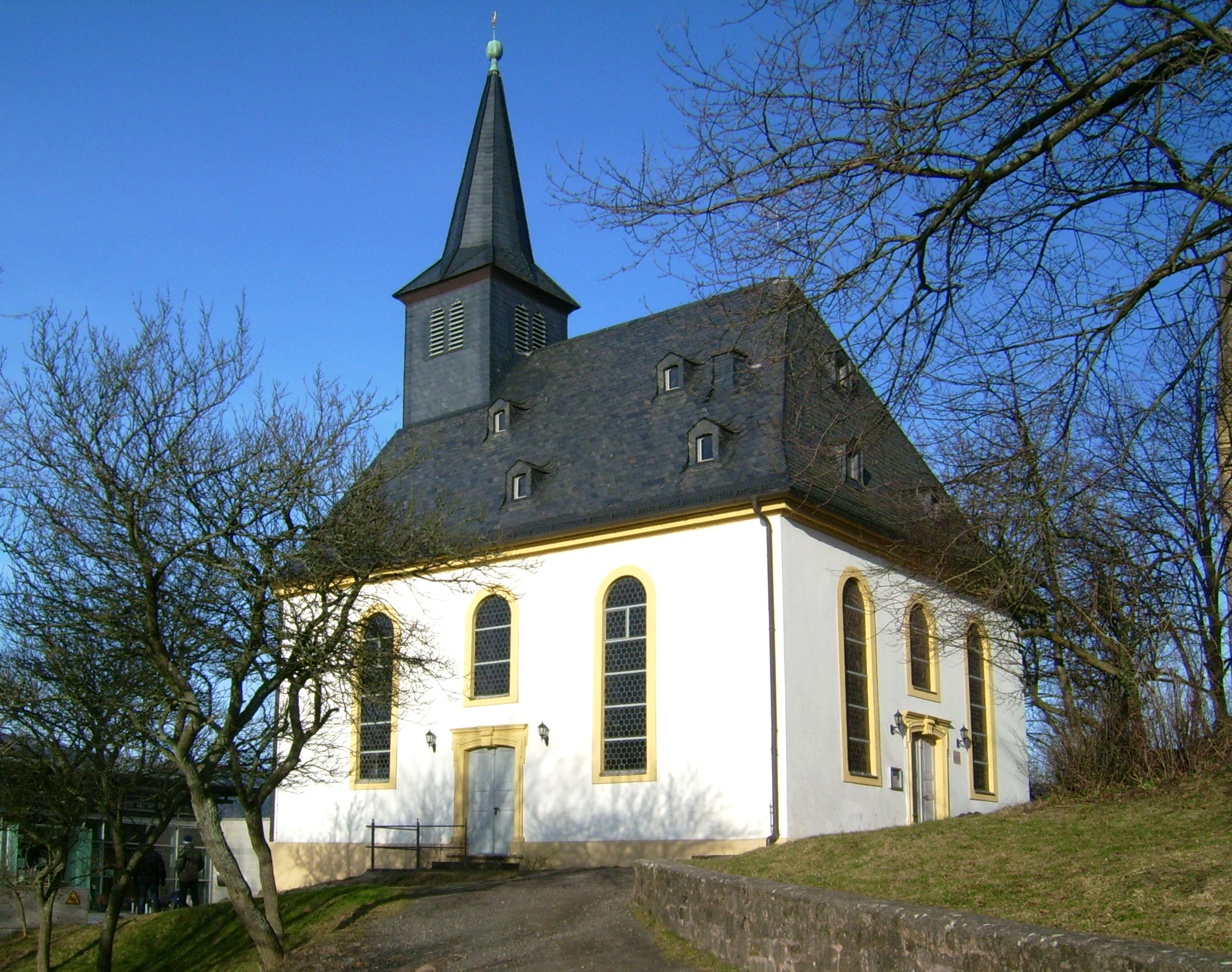
Burgstraße 18: Evangelical church

The following are listed buildings or sites in Rhineland-Palatinate’s Directory of Cultural Monuments:

- Jewish graveyard (monumental zone) – older part laid out in 1725, newer part in 1845; 140 gravestones, beginning from 1747
- Lichtenberg Castle (monumental zone) – built by Count Gerlach III of Veldenz, first mentioned in 1214, burnt down in 1799; girding walls, gateway arch and wall remnants of the Lower Castle begun about 1200, keep with inner ringwall of the Upper Castle begun about 1270 with 16th-century battery tower and two palatial buildings, earlier half of the 14th century and earlier half of the 15th century, Evangelical church and state scrivener’s office from the 18th century; Palatinate’s biggest castle complex
- Evangelical church, Burgstraße 18 – rectangular plastered building with ridge turret, 1755-1758, ridge turret’s pointed spire 1874

=== Regular events ===
The municipality celebrates a May Day Festival (Maifest) on 30 April and 1 May, while Kirchweih, the church consecration festival, is held on the second weekend in August.

=== Clubs ===
There are several clubs in Thallichtenberg, currently an FCK-Fanclub Burgteufel, the volunteer fire brigade promotional association, a mixed choir, a countrywomen’s club, the Burg Lichtenberg – Thallichtenberg Pensioners’ Club, the Lichtenberg Chess Club, the Edelweiß Shooting Club, an SPD local association and the Burg Lichtenberg Gymnastic and Sport Association.

== Economy and infrastructure ==
=== Economic structure ===
At the time of the feudal lordship, the villagers were to a great extent dependent on the castle, which was for them an important basis on which livelihoods were earned. During the 19th and early 20th centuries, the castle served the cutlers and nailers as a dwelling place. Even today, it is regarded as an important income earner, although now its use as such comes from tourism and the many thousands of visitors that that draws to the castle each year. Apart from that, agriculture was also held to be the most important source of income in earlier times. It must be borne in mind, too, that in farming households, especially in winter, wool was spun, and many looms were to be found in houses. Farmers drove their horsecarts to town, particularly to Oberstein, and to market in Sankt Wendel to sell their wares. Within Thallichtenberg's limits were no collieries, but there may have been some nearby. Tourism now offers some opportunities. Thallichtenberg is otherwise a commuter community.

=== Education ===
==== Education history ====
In 1577, for the first time, a schoolmaster's name appeared in the historical record. He taught at the Lichtenberg Castle school and his name was Jam Thein; he was from Lauterecken. Children from the whole Burgfrieden were meant to attend this school. Classes were only sparsely attended for the children had to walk a long, arduous way to school and back each day, unless they happened to live right at the castle. The schoolroom itself changed, moving from one place to another according to whatever space was available at any given time. One teacher, Antonius Wahl, even opened the school without any particular assignment. Even during the Thirty Years' War, classes could still be held, and later even pupils from Pfeffelbach attended the school at the castle. In 1671, there were three schoolchildren from Körborn, five from Dennweiler, nine from the castle itself, three from Ruthweiler and a further three from Thallichtenberg below the castle. This was fewer than half the children in the named communities who had reached school age. Especially with younger children, absences were excused if they were due to bad weather. Older pupils, too, often had to stay at home to take care of livestock. In 1777, a storm tore parts of the schoolhouse that then stood down. The castle stood throughout the 18th century as the schooling centre for all the villages in the Burgfrieden. Only after French Revolutionary and Napoleonic times did the surrounding villages, one by one, begin to get their own schools. It was also at this time that Dennweiler, Frohnbach and Körborn found themselves in the Kingdom of Bavaria anyway as a result of what had been decided at the Congress of Vienna. In 1835, the then Amtsbürgermeister, named Sohns, bought the former Lichtenberg Castle scrivener's building at auction to set up a school within it for the pupils from Burglichtenberg, Thallichtenberg and Ruthweiler. Thallichtenberg got its own school in 1845, while in 1870, the schoolhouse at the castle burnt down, and then a new one was built in Ruthweiler to serve Burglichtenberg and Ruthweiler. When the village of Burglichtenberg was dissolved in 1910, all families living there were counted as inhabitants of Thallichtenberg. Since Thallichtenberg was now also asserting ownership rights on the schoolhouse in Ruthweiler and was demanding a financial adjustment, a court case ensued that was put to an end only after the Second World War by a compromise. In 1928, the municipality of Thallichtenberg built its own schoolhouse on the road to Baumholder.

==== Schooling today ====
Since Thallichtenberg's transfer to the Kusel district in 1969, primary school pupils attend classes in Pfeffelbach, while Hauptschule students go to schools in Kusel. Other kinds of schools, such as Gymnasium, Realschule, Berufsbildende Schulen (vocational training schools) and Förderschulen (special schools), are represented in Kusel.

=== Transport ===
To the south runs the Autobahn A 62 (Kaiserslautern–Trier). The nearest Autobahn interchanges are at Reichweiler and Kusel, each about 5 or 6 km. Landesstraße 176 between Kusel and Baumholder crosses the village, while Landesstraße 349 branches off at Thallichtenberg, going towards Pfeffelbach. Kreisstraße 23 leads by way of Lichtenberg Castle to Körborn. Serving Kusel is a railway station on the Landstuhl–Kusel railway. There are hourly trains at this station throughout the day, namely Regionalbahn service RB 67 between Kaiserslautern and Kusel, named Glantalbahn after a former railway line that shared a stretch of its tracks with the Landstuhl–Kusel railway, including the former junction at Glan-Münchweiler. Formerly, Thallichtenberg itself had a railway connection on the Kusel-Ottweiler railway line (Ostertalbahn), which ran from 1936 to 1969. The right-of-way nowadays serves as a hiking and cycling path.

== Gallery ==
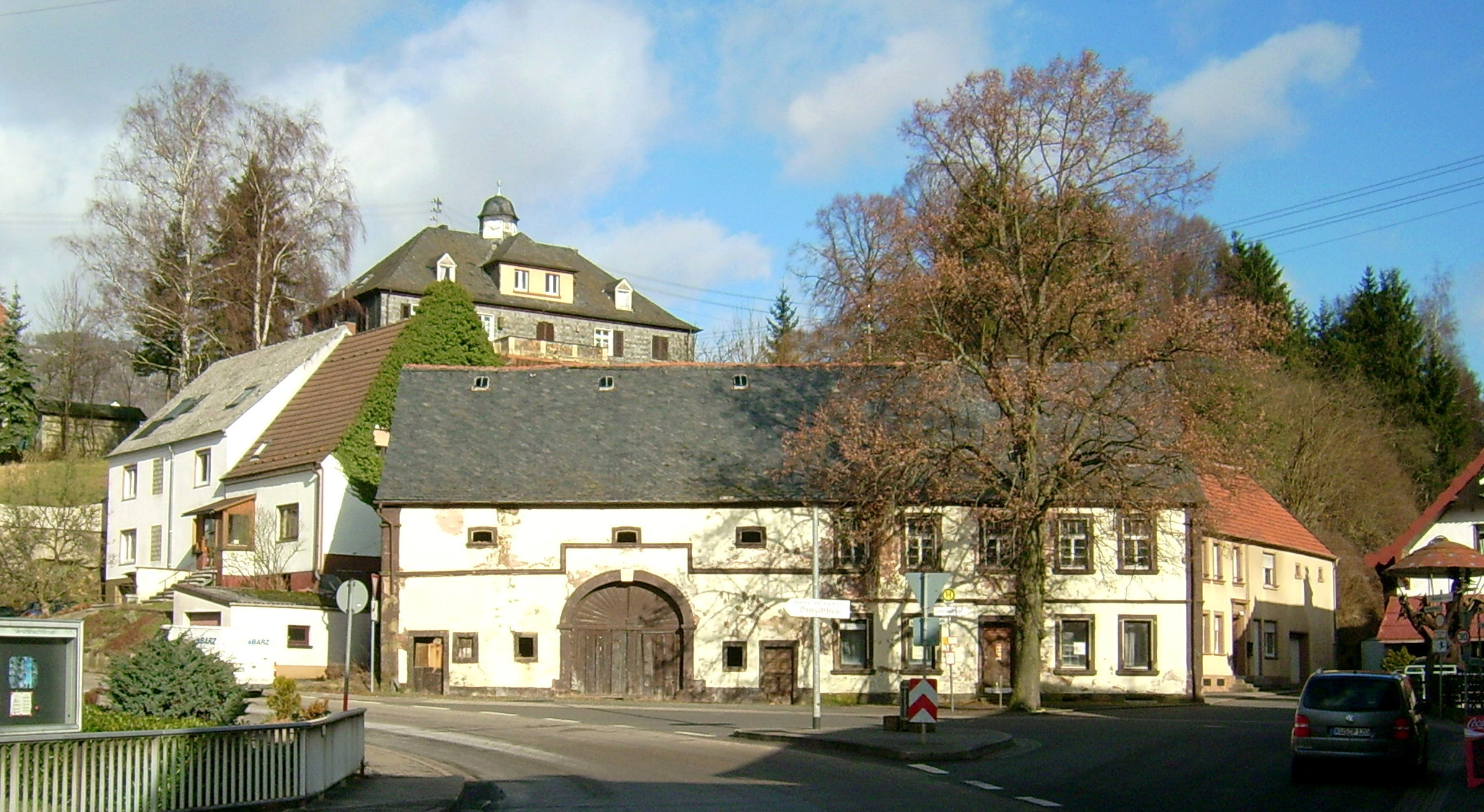
View of the village

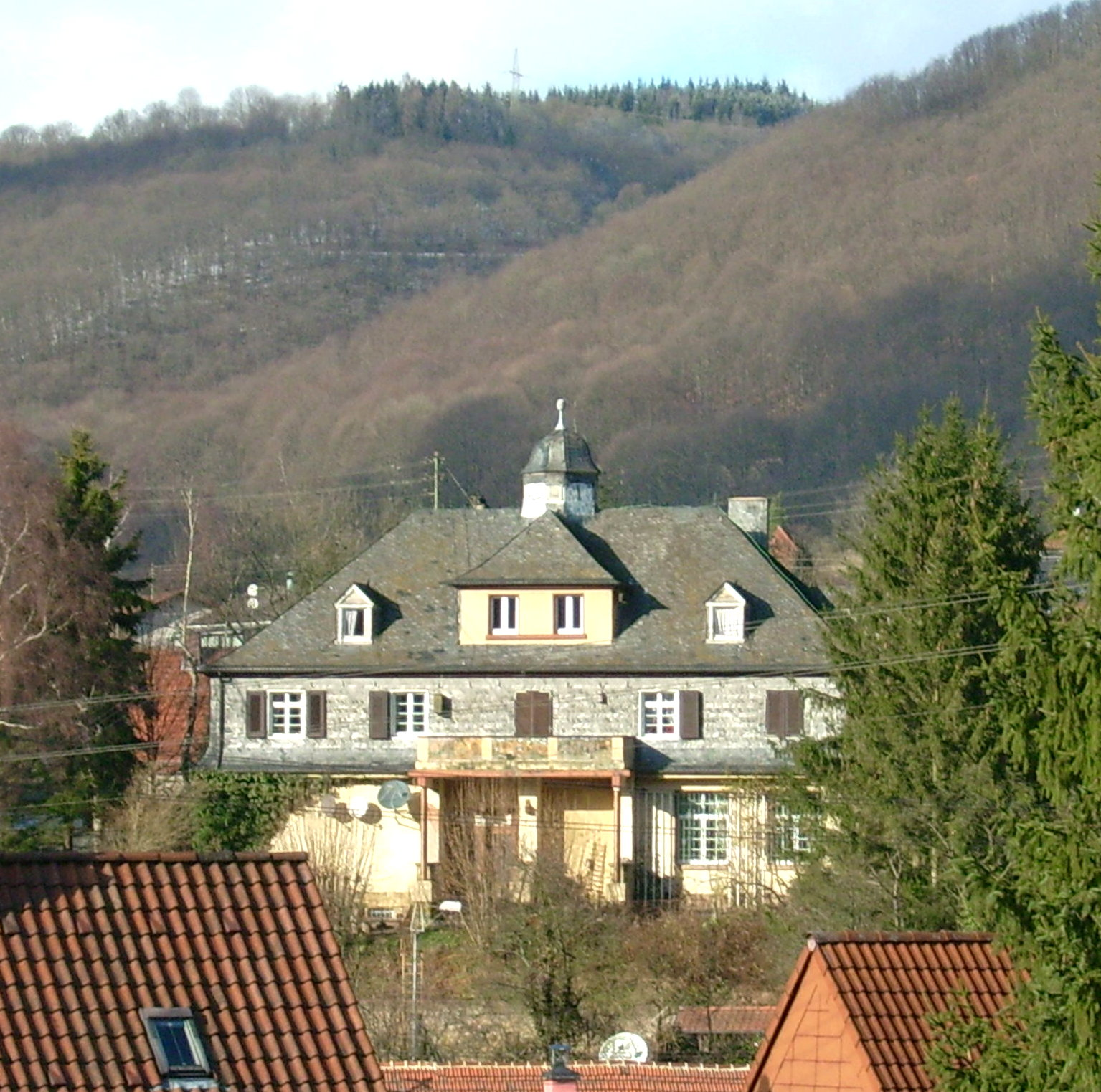

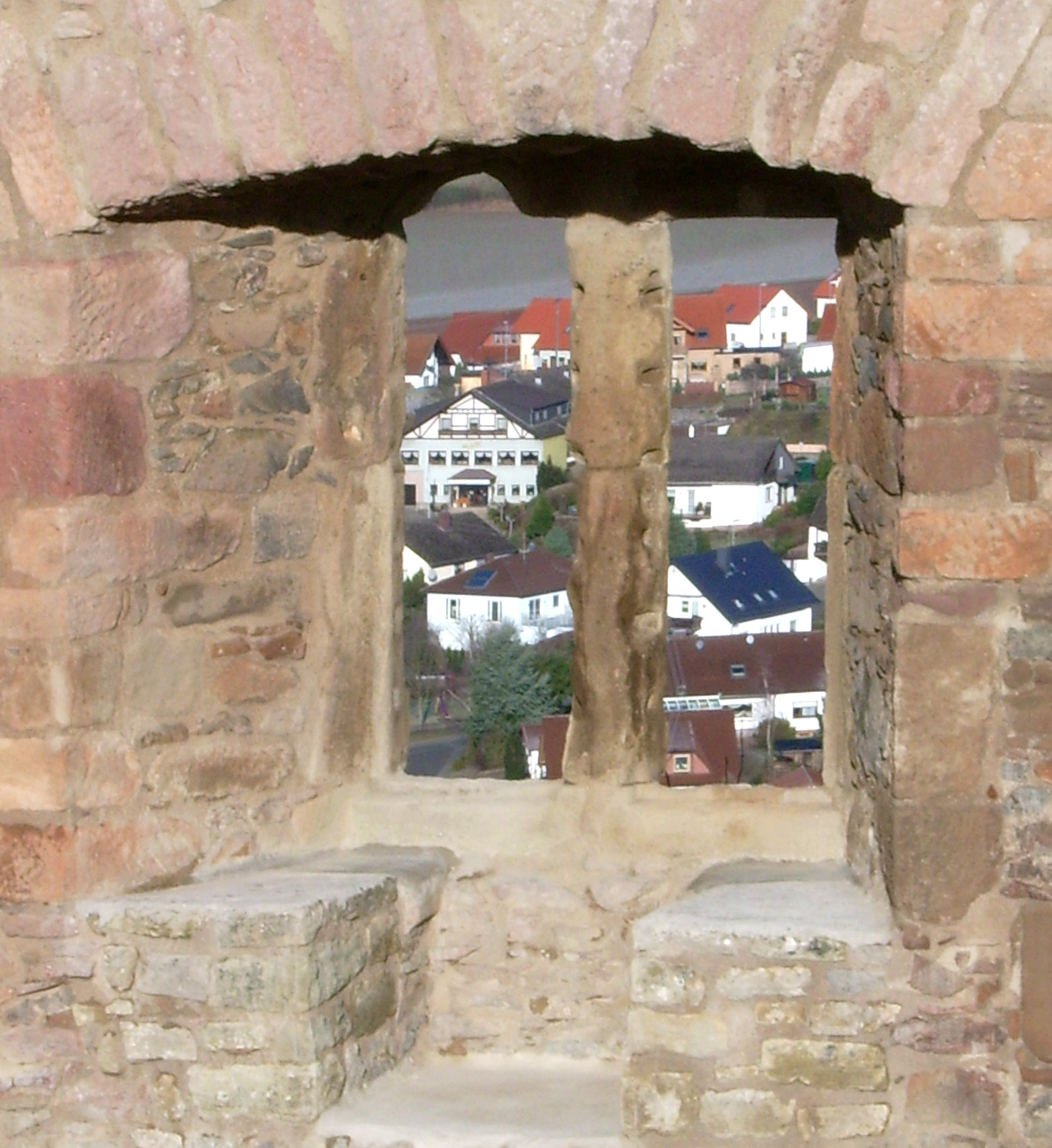
View through a window
