= Erdesbach =

- Municipality
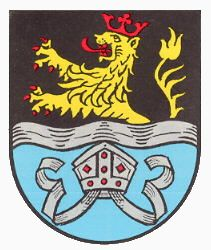
- Coat of arms

- Location of Erdesbach within Kusel district
- Interactive map of Erdesbach
- Location within Germany Location within Rhineland-Palatinate
- Coordinates: 49°34′23″N 7°26′32″E
- Country: Germany
- State: Rhineland-Palatinate
- District: Kusel
- Municipal assoc.: Kusel-Altenglan

Government
  - Mayor (2019–24): Ralf Lukas

Area
  - Total: 3.94 km^{2} (1.52 sq mi)
- Elevation: 201 m (659 ft)

Population (2025-12-31)
  - Total: 588
  - Density: 149/km^{2} (387/sq mi)
- Time zone: UTC+01:00 (CET)
  - Summer (DST): UTC+02:00 (CEST)
- Postal codes: 66887
- Dialling codes: 06381
- Vehicle registration: KUS
- Website: www.erdesbach.de

Erdesbach is an Ortsgemeinde – a municipality belonging to a Verbandsgemeinde, a kind of collective municipality – in the Kusel district in Rhineland-Palatinate, Germany. It belongs to the Verbandsgemeinde of Kusel-Altenglan, whose seat is in Kusel.

== Geography ==
=== Location ===
The municipality lies in the Kusel Musikantenland (“Minstrels’ Land”) in the Western Palatinate, on the middle Glan, through whose narrow valley run Bundesstraße 420, the once strategically important Glantalbahn (railway) and the river Glan itself side by side with each other. Right at this narrowing in the dale nestles a greater part of the village, about a kilometre long, stretching along both sides of the roadway, lying in some spots right beneath the dale's steep slopes. The other half of the village is squeezed into two side valleys that run down to the Glan through which run the Wingertsbach and the Gölschbach. The landscape around Erdesbach is characterized by the narrow Glan valley with its fertile flood-plain meadows, by the steeply rising, overgrown slopes to the west and northwest and by the far less steep slope to the east with its scant meadow and cropfield soils. The riverside flats within municipal limits lie at an elevation of roughly 190 m above sea level, while elevations in the southwest reach 385 m above sea level and those in the municipal area's east 335 m above sea level.

=== Land use ===
The vegetation cover characterizing local land use takes the form of meadow orchards, meadows and cropfields along with some 60 ha of mixed forest. The south slope at the so-called Wingertsberg (“Vineyard’s Mountain”) was still characterized in the 19th century by vineyards and hillside meadows. The last vineyard was dissolved in 1945. Currently, many vineyard walls are still well preserved. The municipal area was divided wholly into agricultural smallholds; there was not even one major block of land in only one owner's hands. Often, as a result of inheritance disputes, plots were split into ever smaller pieces. The municipal area measures 401 ha.

=== Geology ===
The Erdesbach area is geologically characterized mainly by the so-called Kusel Strata (Kuseler Schichten in German) of the Lower Rotliegend. These strata are made up mainly of sandstone, claystone and conglomerates. The basic volcanic rock deposited in between is mainly made up of melaphyre, andesite, tholeiitic basalt and cuselite. The geological structure to a great extent defines the shape of the municipal area's relief.

=== Climate ===
The Erdesbach area lies within the zone affected by the prevailing westerly winds. Characteristic of this kind of climate are moderate summers and to a great extent, mild, damp winters. The mean yearly temperature between 1881 and 1930 lay between 8 and 9 °C in the Glan valley, and at 7 °C in the surrounding heights.

=== Neighbouring municipalities ===
Erdesbach borders in the north on the municipality of Ulmet, in the east on the municipality of Bedesbach, in the south on the municipality of Altenglan, in the southwest on the municipality of Blaubach and in the west on the municipality of Oberalben.

=== Constituent communities ===
In the village's east, across the Glan, a small outlying hamlet arose in the latter half of the 19th century around the old Erdesbacher Mühle (mill), the so-called “Bockhof” with four farms and a smithy. Since then, after the Second World War, especially in the 1980s, this hamlet has grown with new building and now counts roughly 50 inhabitants.

=== Municipality’s layout ===
Erdesbach was formerly a workers’ and farmers’ village as well as a centre for craftsmen, and thus still bears today the nickname Dorf der Zimmerleute – “Village of Carpenters”. In 1981, there were still 50 to 60 carpenters, cabinetmakers and formworkers. They all learnt their hard trades at one of the then three local carpentry shops. Today, the village is almost purely a residential community for those who commute to jobs in Kusel, Kaiserslautern, Ramstein, Baumholder and even as far away as Mannheim and Ludwigshafen. Since 1994, mainly owing to farm shutdowns, there have been no independent agricultural operations at all. Erdesbach may be characterized as a linear village (by some definitions, a “thorpe”). Still currently busy in the municipality are five craft businesses with all together roughly 30 employees, a bakery, a butcher’s shop, two grocer’s shops, a hairdresser’s shops and an alternative practitioner.

== History ==
=== Antiquity ===
Worthy of note are protohistoric archaeological finds of Celtic origin. In 1902, during building work on the trackbed for the Bad Münster-Homburg railway (Glantalbahn), a grave with jugs and lance tips was discovered. Four prehistoric barrows stand in a row on the heights along the municipal limit with Altenglan (Ortsteil of Patersbach). They show that the Erdesbach area was settled in prehistoric times. About 500 BC, the Celts were living here. With Gaul’s subjugation by Julius Caesar (58-31 BC), the land ended up under Roman rule.

=== Middle Ages ===
In the time of the Migration Period, the local area first fell under the sway of the Alemanni, after whose defeat by the Frankish King Clovis I in AD 496 it fell under Frankish rule. Erdesbach’s founding came some four or five centuries later. In the earlier half of the 12th century, Count Gerlach received as successor to the Counts of the Nahegau the Vogtei (that is, he became a “lord protector” of sorts) over various areas under ecclesiastical ownership, which he took along with parts of the Nahegau to found the County of Veldenz. Under his protection, too, was the Remigiusland. According to the 1364 document in which Erdesbach's first documentary mention is found, the inhabitants of the Unteramt of Altenglan, and thus also the inhabitants of Erdesbach, had to support the young Prince Heinrich (later Heinrich III of Veldenz) and his wife Loretta of Sponheim with a special tax. The last Count of Veldenz, Frederick III, died in 1444 without a male heir and the county thus passed to his son-in-law, Stephen, Count Palatine of Simmern-Zweibrücken, widower of Frederick's daughter, Anna of Veldenz. Stephen took some Palatinate territory that he held and, combining it with his wife's inheritance, founded the new County Palatine of Zweibrücken, which later came to be seen as a duchy. Within this new County Palatine, Erdesbach belonged to the Unteramt of Ulmet in the Oberamt of Lichtenberg.

=== Modern times ===
Erdesbach remained with the Duchy of Palatinate-Zweibrücken until that state was swept away by the French Revolutionary troops who marched into the region and occupied it. During the roughly 350 years under Zweibrücken hegemony, the village had to face hard blows of fate. In 1609, there were 137 houses standing in Erdesbach, and the village's population was about 500, but by the time the Thirty Years' War was over, the village had all but died out, just like so many villages in the Kusel region. New families came to Erdesbach, but French King Louis XIV's wars of conquest brought further death and destruction. Only in the early 18th century did any strong population growth once more begin. During the time of Napoleon’s annexation of the German lands on the Rhine’s left bank, beginning in 1801, Erdesbach belonged to the Mairie (“Mayoralty”) of Ulmet, the Canton of Kusel, the Arrondissement of Birkenfeld and the Department of Sarre, whose seat was at Trier.

==== Recent times ====
With the founding of the Kingdom of Bavaria after French times in 1816, Erdesbach belonged to the Bürgermeisteramt (“Mayoralty”) of Ulmet, the Landcommissariat (later Bezirksamt, then Landkreis, or rural district) of Kusel and the bayerischer Rheinkreis, the part of the kingdom that was not contiguous with the rest to the east. The kingdom's borders, as defined by the Congress of Vienna, remained thus until 1945 (by which time the monarchy had ended and Bavaria was now the Free State of Bavaria). With the formation of the new state of Rhineland-Palatinate in 1947, consisting of the Regierungsbezirke of Koblenz, Trier, Montabaur, Rheinhessen and Pfalz, a new political order was created in the southwest of what was shortly to become West Germany. Later, the Regierungsbezirke of Montabaur and Rheinhessen were dissolved and integrated into the Regierungsbezirke of Koblenz and Pfalz respectively; in 2000, all the state's Regierungsbezirke were dissolved, and in their stead arose the Aufsichts- und Dienstleistungsdirektion (ADD. roughly “Directorate of Inspection and Services”), which is now responsible for the whole of Rhineland-Palatinate.

=== Population development ===
According to a debt book kept by the Remigiusberg Monastery, a taxation list from the Oberamt of Lichtenberg indicated that just under 100 people were living in Erdesbach in 1480. According to the 1609 Konken Protocols (Konker Protokolle), it was roughly 500. A consequential drop in population was brought by the Thirty Years' War. Indeed, the population had only once more reached as high as 150 in 1776, according to a list of subjects from the Duchy of Palatinate-Zweibrücken. In an examination by Michael Frey of the bayerischer Rheinkreis, a population figure for Erdesbach of 143 souls was stated, and 316 for 1837, of whom 309 were Protestant and 7 were Catholic. From the middle of the 19th century onwards, the village experienced a great upswing in population, bearing witness to which was the widespread construction about the turn of the 20th century. Thus, the 1837 population figure of 316 inhabitants had grown to 425 by 1871, to 631 by 1905, to 607 by 1939, to 659 by 1961, to 687 by 1964, to 739 by 1969 and to 687 by 1977. Thereafter, the population figures began to shrink steadily, reaching their lowest in many years in 1988, when there were only 570 inhabitants in Erdesbach. The opening of land to new development drew newcomers to the village and the population once again began a steady rise in 1984, reaching 640 by 1996. However, this newer growth may stagnate in the future.

The following table shows population development over the centuries for Erdesbach, with some figures broken down by religious denomination:

Year	1825	1835	1871	1905	1939	1961	1996	2005
Total	282	316	428	631	607	659	640	638
Evangelical	271					622		507
Catholic	11					32		77
Other	–					5		54

=== Municipality’s name ===
The placename's meaning, according to Professor Ernst Christman, goes back to the given name Herideo. In 1364, Erdesbach had its first documentary mention as Ertenspach. From 1456 to 1460, the village was called at times Hertespach, Hertzbach and even Ertelspach. About 1480, the names Ertisbach and Ertsbach cropped up, and in the years between 1585 and 1588, the village's name appeared as Ertesbach, as it also did in the 1609 Konken Protocols. The current name, Erdesbach, first appeared in 1785.

== Religion ==
The municipality of Erdesbach has no church of its own; it belongs to the parish of Ulmet. The overwhelming majority in the village is Evangelical, 507 of 640 inhabitants. Seventy-seven inhabitants, however, are Catholic. Adhering to other faiths are five villagers, while 34 belong to no religious group and 15 refused to answer the question.

== Politics ==
=== Municipal council ===
The council is made up of 12 council members, who were elected by majority vote at the municipal election held on 7 June 2009, and the honorary mayor as chairman.

=== Mayor ===
Erdesbach's mayor is Ralf Lukas, and his deputies are Helmut Fehrentz and Joachim May.

=== Coat of arms ===
The German blazon reads: Von schwarz und blau durch einen silbernen Wellenbalken geteilt, oben ein rot gekrönter und rot bewehrter goldener Löwe, unten eine silberne mit roten Steinen belegte Mitra mit seitlich abflatternden Bändern.

The municipality's arms might in English heraldic language be described thus: A fess wavy argent between sable a demilion Or armed, langued and crowned gules, and azure a mitre of the first garnished of the fourth.

The charge below the wavy fess, a mitre, refers to Erdesbach's former feudal landlord, the Bishopric of Reims, under whose sway lay the Remigiusland. The lion is drawn from the arms borne by the Wittelsbachs, the ruling house of the Duchy of Palatinate-Zweibrücken and later the Kingdom of Bavaria, to which Erdesbach once also belonged. The wavy fess stands for the river Glan.

== Culture and sightseeing ==
=== Buildings ===
The following are listed buildings or sites in Rhineland-Palatinate’s Directory of Cultural Monuments:

- Mühlweg 10, 21, 23, 25, mills (monumental zone) – former mill with weir and two farming properties: nos. 10 and 21: former mill: no. 10, 18th century, no. 21: building with half-hipped roof, late 19th century, no. 23: Quereinhaus (a combination residential and commercial house divided for these two purposes down the middle, perpendicularly to the street), marked 1758 and 1806 (conversion), no. 25: Quereinhaus, 1869
- Zweibrücker Straße 32 – former school; plastered building with ridge turret, Rundbogenstil openings, 1838, architect possibly Johann Schmeisser, Kusel

=== Regular events ===
Until 1966, the more than 500-year-old Gallusmarkt (“Saint Gall’s Market”) was celebrated together with the bigger neighbouring municipality of Ulmet in the middle of the week as a kermis (church consecration festival). Its dates were set at the first Tuesday and Wednesday after Saint Gall's Day (16 October). In 1966, following the citizens’ wishes, and after municipal council had voted unanimously on the question, the kermis date was moved from late autumn to summer, namely the first weekend in August. The raising of the Maypole on May Day is a job that was taken over years ago by the young men of the volunteer fire brigade. Likewise for years now, the municipality has worked together with the local SPD association to marshal a proper Saint Martin's Day parade on 11 November with music and a rider (Saint Martin) and a great Saint Martin's Day celebration. With the opening of the Glantal-Halle in 1979, the municipality revived an old tradition. Each year on 27 December, the so-called Wandertag (“Roaming Day”) recalls an old custom that was still quite well observed in the 1920s, for on this day, then dialectally known as Wannerschdag, menservants and maidservants would change to their new masters.

=== Clubs ===
Erdesbachers are heavily engaged in clubs. The village's oldest club was the men's singing club founded in 1856. Some 10 years after its 127-year jubilee, it had to cease its singing activities temporarily owing to a dearth of men who could sing bass (sound). The club with the most members is the Turn- und Sportverein Erdesbach 1907 e.V. (gymnastic and sport club) with its football, shooting and gymnastics departments. An outstanding sport facility and a big clubhouse are both among the club's real estate holdings. Besides these clubs, the following ones also exist in the local community:

- Evangelische Frauenbund — Evangelical women's association
- FCK Fan-Club — 1. FC Kaiserslautern fan club
- Landfrauenverein — countrywomen's club
- Rentnerverein — pensioners’ club
- SPD-Ortsverein — local SPD association
- Sportanglerverein — angling
- Tischtennisclub — table tennis

For all these clubs, the village community has established, under the municipality's auspices, the Glantalhalle, a hall measuring 12 × 24 m and with a stage, built between 1977 and 1979 almost exclusively by in-house efforts. It was dedicated on 30 June 1979.

== Economy and infrastructure ==
=== Economic structure ===
Up until the outbreak of the Second World War, men capable of working earned their livelihoods for their families mostly in the many small and few big quarries (hard rock and sandstone) as quarrymen, stone dressers or stonemasons, as craftsmen at the local craft businesses, and also as farmers as their secondary occupation at the many small secondary agricultural operations that were to be found at almost every house in Erdesbach. Mainly it was grain or potatoes that were grown, and mostly for the growers’ own needs. Five full-time farmers lived in the municipality at this time. About 1960, there were still three carpentry businesses in the municipality, along with three building companies, a cabinetry shop, a plasterer’s shop, a blacksmith, a shoemaker’s workshop, two tailor’s shops, an installation shop, four bakeries, two butcher’s shops, a haulage business and a mill. For women in those days, there were no job opportunities in this poor area. They were obliged to do the housekeeping, the childrearing and also some work on the little farms that the men worked as a sideline. Today, members of the workforce are mainly commuters who go to work in the big industrial works in Kaiserslautern, the nearby Saarland or the local middle centres. Early on in the 20th century (1909), Erdesbach got its own centralized waterworks. The system was fed by several walled-up surface wells. After these wells began to run dry in the early 1970s at a time when demand for water was always steadily rising, Erdesbach had to link itself to the “Ohmbachtal” special-purpose association's water supply at the same time as the municipality was seeking to expand its new water supply network.

=== Education ===
The first proper schoolhouse in the municipality was built in the years 1818/1819. From the time of its completion up until 1958, all schoolchildren were at first taught together (1819-1898), but later, only the first four-year levels were taught together. In 1898, another schoolhouse opened, whereafter the old school was always known locally as the Kleine Schule – “Little School”. Before the first school had been built, all schoolchildren had been taught at the municipal hall on Kuselweg, and before that, all schoolchildren from Erdesbach had had to attend school in Ulmet until 1762. With the completion of the new schoolhouse in 1898, the pupils, who had hitherto been one group, were split. Year levels 1 to 4 remained at the Little School (somewhat confusingly also called the Obere Schule – “Upper School”), and on 1 May 1906, there were 65 pupils there. Because the so-called Große Schule (“Big School”), which housed year levels 5 to 7 (and later 8 as well) stood on lower ground than the old school, it was also known as the Untere Schule – “Lower School”. Seventy schoolchildren were being taught there in 1906. In 1958, to improve the teaching-learning environment somewhat, a new classroom with a teachers’ room and a toilet facility was built onto the back of the existing Big School. With the official dedication of this extension on 23 October 1958, the Upper/Little School was closed. The venerable building then served, upstairs and towards the front, as a public rental dwelling until 1972. The former classroom was used as a community facility. As a result of a municipal council decision in 1973–1974, the whole inside of the old school was thoroughly remodelled. From the former classroom arose a nice community/conference room that could accommodate about 60 persons. The former flat became the municipal council chamber, the mayor's office, a kitchen and a toilet facility. After it had been given a new outer coat of paint, the old schoolhouse presented itself as a well usable and smart village community centre. In 1969 and 1970, year levels 5 to 8 were incorporated into the newly built Altenglan Mittelpunktschule (“midpoint school”, a central school, designed to eliminate smaller outlying schools). Later, the Mittelpunktschule was upgraded to first a Hauptschule and then, in 1996, to a Regionalschule. Since 1973, primary school pupils from the villages of Ulmet, Erdesbach, Niederalben and Rathsweiler have been attending the primary school in Ulmet, with at first two of that school's classes being housed at the Big School in Erdesbach. All classes, though, have since been gathered together in Ulmet.

=== Transport ===
Running through the village is Bundesstraße 420. To the south runs the Autobahn A 62 (Kaiserslautern–Trier). Serving Altenglan is Altenglan station on the Landstuhl–Kusel railway. There are hourly trains at this station throughout the day, namely Regionalbahn service RB 67 between Kaiserslautern and Kusel, named Glantalbahn after a former railway line that shared a stretch of its tracks with the Landstuhl–Kusel railway.

== Famous people ==
=== Sons and daughters of the town ===
- George Drumm (1874–1959), musician and composer who later lived in the United States. Drumm's last visit to his home village was in 1954. His works and life are documented in the Kusel Musikantenland (“Minstrels’ Land”) at the museum at Lichtenberg Castle.
- Otto Brückner (1899–1989), graphic artist (pen drawings, watercolours, oil paintings), mostly treated local subjects.
- Albert Zink (1900–1969), local historian, produced many essays and photographs.
