= Rathsweiler =

- Municipality
- Coat of arms

- Location of Rathsweiler within Kusel district
- Interactive map of Rathsweiler
- Location within Germany Location within Rhineland-Palatinate
- Coordinates: 49°35′52.95″N 7°27′30.52″E
- Country: Germany
- State: Rhineland-Palatinate
- District: Kusel
- Municipal assoc.: Kusel-Altenglan

Government
  - Mayor (2019–24): Siegmund Steiner

Area
  - Total: 4.24 km^{2} (1.64 sq mi)
- Elevation: 200 m (660 ft)

Population (2025-12-31)
  - Total: 147
  - Density: 34.7/km^{2} (89.8/sq mi)
- Time zone: UTC+01:00 (CET)
  - Summer (DST): UTC+02:00 (CEST)
- Postal codes: 66887
- Dialling codes: 06387
- Vehicle registration: KUS

Rathsweiler is an Ortsgemeinde – a municipality belonging to a Verbandsgemeinde, a kind of collective municipality – in the Kusel district in Rhineland-Palatinate, Germany. It belongs to the Verbandsgemeinde of Kusel-Altenglan, whose seat is in Kusel.

== Geography ==
=== Location ===
The municipality lies near the river Glan in the Western Palatinate. Rathsweiler lies in the Glan valley near where the Steinalb empties into the Glan at an elevation of 187 m above sea level and at the foot of the Hohlbusch (403 m) and the Nollkopf (402 m). Within the village itself, elevations range from 195 to 220 m above sea level. The municipal area measures 425 ha, of which 116 ha is wooded and roughly 10 ha is settled. In 1987, 160 ha of land was sold to the Federal Republic and it now belongs to the Baumholder troop drilling ground.

=== Neighbouring municipalities ===
Rathsweiler borders in the west and north on the Baumholder troop drilling ground, in the east on the municipality of Niederalben and in the south on the municipality of Ulmet.

=== Constituent communities ===
Also belonging to Rathsweiler is the outlying homestead of Christoffelsmühle.

=== Municipality’s layout ===
Originally, the village lay along the Zweibrücken–Meisenheim cross-country road as a linear village (by some definitions, a “thorpe”). Rathsweiler's original characterization as a thorpe, however, was later lost in the expansion that the village underwent in the 19th and 20th centuries. These expansions lie on the road known today as Bundesstraße 420 and in a new building zone in the village's southwest. A row of old Einfirsthäuser (“houses with a single roof ridge”) or Quereinhäuser (combination residential and commercial houses divided for these two purposes down the middle, perpendicularly to the street) along the former village street is said to be a special cultural monument featuring preserved farmhouses that were typical of the Westrich, an historic region that encompasses areas in both Germany and France. The Christoffelsmühle, an old watermill, lies roughly 1 km from the village core in the village's north end on the Steinalb, and can be reached only along a farm lane and forest path, or an indirect road from the neighbouring village of Niederalben. The waterwheel is still running even today.

== History ==
=== Antiquity ===
The area around what is now Rathsweiler was already settled in prehistoric times, bearing witness to which are archaeological finds from the neighbouring villages of Ulmet and Niederalben. Beneath the Hohlbusch, many bricks have been unearthed, a clue that there might once have been a Gallo-Roman villa rustica here. A Roman road also once ran right by this place.

=== Middle Ages ===
Just when Rathsweiler was founded is something that cannot be pinpointed now, but the village is surely rather older than its 1364 first documentary mention. From the beginning, it lay within the Remigiusland, over which the Counts of Veldenz held the Vogtei beginning in 1246. According to Michael Frey, the name cropped up as early as 1362 in connection with disagreements between the Counts of Veldenz and the Rhinegraves. It goes without saying that the original documents outlining these details have been lost, for according to Dolch and Greule (writing more than a century later), Rathsweiler's first documentary mention came in 1364. According to this document, which Count Heinrich II of Veldenz issued for his son Heinrich III and his wife Loretta of Sponheim – who lived at Castle Lichtenberg – the inhabitants of the Unteramt of Altenglan-Brücken had to contribute to this couple's needs. Heinrich III later became Count of Veldenz, ruling the county from 1371 to 1389. Loretta – also called Lauretta – came from the comital House of Sponheim-Starkenburg. In 1444, the County of Veldenz met its end when Count Friedrich III of Veldenz died without a male heir. His daughter Anna wed King Ruprecht's son Count Palatine Stephan. By uniting his own Palatine holdings with the now otherwise heirless County of Veldenz – his wife had inherited the county, but not her father's title – and by redeeming the hitherto pledged County of Zweibrücken, Stephan founded a new County Palatine, as whose comital residence he chose the town of Zweibrücken: the County Palatine – later Duchy – of Palatinate-Zweibrücken.

=== Modern times ===
In 1526, the County Palatine of Zweibrücken introduced the Reformation. During the Thirty Years' War, the municipal area became known for the Battle of Brücken (Schlacht von Brücken), Brücken being a now vanished village (not the like-named place elsewhere in the district). The scene was set for this event when a Spanish campaign coming from Rockenhausen into the Glan valley invaded and was pursued by Swedish troops under Rhinegrave Otto's command. The Spaniards camped near Brücken, and on the morning of 25 May 1632, a heavy storm struck. After the storm, the Swedes surprised the Spaniards with a sudden attack on their camp, and set all 1,500 of them to flight. All the Spaniards’ supplies fell into the Swedes’ hands. There came more campaigns in the years that followed. All villages on the Middle Glan were destroyed, as was the town of Kusel. Only a very few people survived the onslaught, and Rathsweiler was no exception. Until the French Revolution, there was no change in the local lordships.

==== Recent times ====
After Revolutionary France had annexed the German lands on the Rhine’s left bank, Rathsweiler lay in the Mairie (“Mayoralty”) of Ulmet, the Canton of Kusel, the Arrondissement of Birkenfeld and the Department of Sarre. The village also remained tightly bound with Ulmet after it was united with the Kingdom of Bavaria after Napoleon’s defeat and the new political order laid down by the Congress of Vienna. It now belonged to the Landkommissariat (later Bezirksamt, then Landkreis or “district”) and Canton of Kusel and the Bürgermeisterei (“Mayoralty”) of Ulmet in the bayerischer Rheinkreis, later known as Rheinpfalz (“Rhenish Palatinate”), a Bavarian exclave. In the early 1930s, the Nazi Party (NSDAP) became quite popular in Rathsweiler. In the 1930 Reichstag elections, 18.3% of the local votes went to Adolf Hitler’s party, but by the time of the 1933 Reichstag elections, after Hitler had already seized power, local support for the Nazis had swollen to 62.8%. Hitler’s success in these elections paved the way for his Enabling Act of 1933 (Ermächtigungsgesetz), thus starting the Third Reich in earnest. Only after the Second World War was there yet another meaningful change in the territorial arrangement. In the course of administrative restructuring in Rhineland-Palatinate that began in 1968, Rathsweiler became an Ortsgemeinde within the Verbandsgemeinde of Altenglan in 1972.

=== Population development ===
In days gone by, Rathsweiler was mainly characterized by its farming population, although there were day labourers, miners and quarrymen. There were hardly any craftsmen, though. Today, on the other hand, there are only a very few farmers who actually work the land as their main livelihood, and most people in the workforce must commute to jobs outside the village. Thus, the population is a heterogenous group, some of whom are elderly. Empty houses are, however, usually occupied before long. In the 19th century, a few Jews lived in Rathsweiler, but they had left the village before the Nazis came to power in 1933.

The following table shows population development over the centuries for Rathsweiler, with some figures broken down by religious denomination:

Year	1802	1825	1837	1871	1905	1939	1961	1970	1974	1996	2005
Total	102	153	198	207	187	189	193	163	167	193	176
Catholic		8					4
Evangelical		138					189
Jewish		7					–

=== Municipality’s name ===
The village's name, Rathsweiler, has the common German placename ending —weiler, which as a standalone word means “hamlet” (originally “homestead”), to which is prefixed a syllable Raths—, believed to have arisen from a personal name, Rado, suggesting that the village arose from a homestead founded by an early Frankish settler named Rado. The village's first documentary mention came in 1364 and rendered the name Raitzwijlre; the vanished village of Brücken also had its first documentary mention in this same document. Over the ages, the village has borne, among other names, Ratzwilre (1377), Raytzßwilre (1416), Raitzwilre (1454) and Ratzwillr (1456 and 1588). Now and then, the names Nieder-Ratsweiler and Ober-Ratsweiler crop up (“Nether” and “Upper”). The name in its current spelling first appeared in 1824. The name Christoffelsmühle for the outlying mill goes back to a milling family named Christoffel, who owned the mill in the 19th century. Indeed, the mill had already been mentioned as far back as the 16th century, in 1568, as the mill before the Reisenfels, meaning before the “riven” or “broken” crag, which throughout the area was taken to refer to this mill.

=== Vanished villages ===
The village of Brücken – not the same place as the Brücken in the same district, just north of Schönenberg-Kübelberg – lay between Rathsweiler and Ulmet on the Glan's left bank, near the so-called Kappeler Brücke (bridge). In the Middle Ages, this place was for a time the seat of a Zweibrücken Unteramt. It became well known during the Thirty Years' War for the Battle of Brücken, fought in 1632. The village itself was utterly destroyed, and nobody ever came to settle it again. Brücken had its first documentary mention in 1364 as Brucken undir deme Fluseberge (Modern High German: Brücken unter dem Flussberg, meaning “Brücken under the River Mountain”). Later, vineyards near Brücken were also mentioned. Later documentary mentions rendered the name Brucken, Bruchen or Bricken. This former village's name, derived from the German Brücke (“bridge”), refers to a Glan crossing near the Ulmet country chapel, and thus bears witness to a bridge spanning this river at a very early time.

== Religion ==
From days of yore, Rathsweiler belonged to the parish of Flurskappeln, now known as Ulmet. When the Reformation was introduced by the Counts Palatine of Zweibrücken, the population converted to the Lutheran faith. However, beginning in 1588, Count Palatine Johannes I forced all his subjects to convert to Reformed belief as espoused by John Calvin. The difference between Luther's and Calvin's teachings should be briefly explained. An example of Lutheran teaching is the concept that man does not find his way to God simply by doing good works, but only through belief (sola fide). Calvinist teaching, on the other hand, holds that man's fate is predetermined by God, and that the faithful can fulfil this predetermination and must submit themselves to strict church discipline through obedience and diligence, and by forgoing worldly pleasures. Disobedience to God, however, is the way to hell (double predestination). After the Thirty Years' War, when other denominations were once again allowed, the populace remained overwhelmingly Reformed, or after the 1818 Protestant Union, Evangelical. Until after the Second World War, the Catholic share of the population was roughly 2%. Only very recently has this risen to roughly 10% with the arrival of more Catholics from elsewhere. In the 19th century, a few Jews lived in Rathsweiler. In 1996, the population breakdown by religious affiliation was 126 Evangelicals, 19 Catholics, 15 who had no affiliation and 33 who belonged to other faiths.

== Politics ==
=== Municipal council ===
The council is made up of 6 council members, who were elected by majority vote at the municipal election held on 7 June 2009, and the honorary mayor as chairman.

=== Mayor ===
Rathsweiler's mayor is Siegmund Steiner.

=== Coat of arms ===
The municipality's arms might be described thus: Azure a pall reversed wavy, in chief the letter A surmounted by the letter V, dexter a moon decrescent and sinister a hammer and pick per saltire, all argent.

In Rathsweiler, which belonged to the old Remigiusland, the local lordship was held first by the Counts of Veldenz and then later by the Counts Palatine and Dukes of Palatinate-Zweibrücken. Under the Veldenzes, Rathsweiler belonged to the Niederamt of Ulmet and under the Zweibrückens to a Schultheißerei of the same name in the Oberamt of Lichtenberg. The village had no seal, though in 1748, testamentary affairs were being sealed in Rathsweiler twice, by the Landgericht (regional court) and the estate of Kusel as a kind of lower authority of the Oberamt. This authority sealed documents with a “man in the moon”. The charge on the dexter (armsbearer's right, viewer's left) side is meant to recall that seal, and the A and V are meant to refer to Rathsweiler's former status as part of the Amt of Ulmet. The tinctures, azure and argent (blue and silver) refer to the village's former mediaeval lords, the Counts of Veldenz. The hammer and pick refers to the quicksilver mining that was formerly undertaken in the area around the municipality. The arms have been borne since 1978 when they were approved by the now defunct Rheinhessen-Pfalz Regierungsbezirk administration in Neustadt an der Weinstraße.

== Culture and sightseeing ==
=== Buildings ===
The following are listed buildings or sites in Rhineland-Palatinate’s Directory of Cultural Monuments:

- Dorfstraße 9 – former school; plastered building with ridge turret, 1841, architect Johann Schmeisser, Kusel, extra floor 1888; school garden, Luitpold limetree
- Dorfstraße 1, Glanstraße 2, 20, 18, 16, 12, 10 (monumental zone) – row of big and small complexes with single roof ridges from the 18th and 19th centuries, distinguishing village streetscape

=== Natural monuments ===
Counted foremost among Rathsweiler’s natural monuments is the Steinalbmündung Nature Conservation Area (Naturschutzgebiet Steinalbmündung), parts of which actually also lie within Niederalben’s and Ulmet’s limits.

=== Regular events ===
Formerly, Rathsweiler held its so-called Maikerb (“May Fair”) at the same time as neighbouring Niederalben, on the first weekend in May. Some years ago, however, the timing was changed so that it would fall at a different time, namely the third weekend in May. Other old customs have since disappeared from the village's cultural life.

=== Clubs ===
About 1903, a singing club was founded in Rathsweiler, but after the Second World War, it was never started back up. All that exists nowadays is the countrywomen's club (Landfrauenverein).

== Economy and infrastructure ==
=== Economic structure ===
Even today, agriculture is still a considerable factor in Rathsweiler's economy, even if it is one that is only now pursued by a few concerns. The former baryte and quicksilver mining was given up even before the First World War. In the village itself is a big woodworking business that grew out of a cabinetmaker's shop. Located favourably on Bundesstraße 420 is an inn. The Christoffelsmühle, an old watermill, was once purely a gristmill, but today runs as a sawmill.

=== Education ===
It is unknown when a school was first established in Rathsweiler. In 1762, a winter school (a school geared towards an agricultural community's practical needs, held in the winter, when farm families had a bit more time to spare) was mentioned. In the summertime, interested schoolchildren could attend the Hauptschule (“main school” – not to be confused with a “Hauptschule” as the word is understood today) in Ulmet. The municipality yielded up for the school's upkeep one Malter, two barrels and three Sester of corn (wheat or rye), and paid three Rhenish guilders in money. The full worth of these expenditures amounted to 8 Rhenish guilders, 4 Batzen, 14 Pfennige. In 1784, the winter school was closed because too few children wanted to take part in lessons. One year later, though, the winter school teacher managed to hold classes once again. It is likely that year-round schooling was only introduced in early Bavarian times. In 1837, the municipality bought a plot of land for the schoolteacher to use to better his circumstances. The schoolteacher at that time, Abraham Graß, who was also a municipal councillor, retired from his job on the grounds of advancing age, and the municipality sought a new schoolteacher. The only applicant was Jacob Kayser from Friedelhausen, and so he was hired. The one-room school with its seven-year levels was then attended by 48 schoolchildren. For each pupil, the schoolteacher was owed one franc, and the municipality further paid him 40 francs. Each family with schoolchildren had to deliver payment in kind, namely 25 L of rye and 10 L of spelt. Cash, kind and use of the field were reckoned to be worth all together 152 francs. With schoolteacher Kayser, though, the municipality was not satisfied, for he apparently neither did anything nor showed any interest in doing anything to further the children's learning. Nonetheless, Kayser demanded a payrise. Clearly the upshot was not an agreement, for Kayser soon thereafter left Rathsweiler and his job was once again advertised. In 1843, two candidates applied, Karl Klaus from Ulmet and Georg Bauer from Erdesbach. Klaus, who was then only 18 years old, was hired, but one year later, he was transferred. The municipality promised a considerable improvement of the benefits in money and kind, now with a total worth of 223 francs. Philipp Keiper from Niedermoschel filled the post and stayed in Rathsweiler until his retirement in 1885. In 1844, the municipality had a schoolhouse built, which in 1888 had a further floor added on. Keiper's successor was Michael Assenbaum from Hilpoltstein in Franconia, who in 1889 was named a full teacher. This schoolteacher found himself at odds with the municipality when he demanded that the school cropfield have its own well and council would not approve such a thing. Assenbaum married Anna Maria Viktoria Göckel from Rothenburg in the same year that his last promotion is mentioned. To boost his income, he took over an insurance agency, but he soon became ill with tuberculosis. In 1903, he sought a cure, but he died later that same year. Assistant teacher Burkhardt from Erdesbach now took over the classes, but it was not long before another schoolteacher took over from him, Jakob Weber from Sankt Julian, but then he forthwith had to serve a half year in the military, and while he was away, his place was taken by Friedrich Kopf from Gumbsweiler. Weber came back from his stint in the forces and also took over the singing club and an insurance agency, like Assenbaum before him. He had to do another stint in the forces and this time was represented in the classroom by a schoolteacher from Ulmet. In 1908, Weber had himself transferred to Standenbühl, and he was succeeded as the local schoolteacher by Johannes Vogel, who right away applied for posts in Oggersheim and Limburgerhof, without success. In 1914, he wed Mathilde Schuck from Rathsweiler, Philipp Schuck's daughter. By 1924, he was no longer being mentioned as the Rathsweiler schoolteacher. It was at that time that Karl Schneider, born in 1903, applied for the post. The old one-room schoolhouse was used for lessons right up until 1968. Then, primary school pupils at first went to the primary school in Ulmet and the Hauptschule students to the Hauptschule Offenbach-St. Julian. With the introduction of the Verbandsgemeinde not long afterwards, however, the arrangements changed again. Since then, Hauptschule students have been attending the Regionale Schule in Altenglan, while the primary school pupils have been attending the Grundschule Ulmet (formerly Grundschule Ulmet-Erdesbach).

=== Transport ===
Running through Rathsweiler is Bundesstraße 420 (Oppenheim–Neunkirchen), built in 1938 as an “army road” when the Siegfried Line was being built up, while to the southwest lies the Autobahn A 62 (Kaiserslautern–Trier). Until about 1985, the village had a connection to the Bad Münster am Stein–Homburg railway line, which had been running since 1904. The Niederalben-Rathsweiler railway station nowadays serves as a house. Visitors can now ride draisines on the track. Serving nearby Altenglan is Altenglan station on the Landstuhl–Kusel railway.

== Famous people ==
=== Sons and daughters of the town ===
- Louis Christoffel (b. 1841 in Rathsweiler; d. 1928 in Merkstein near Aachen)

Born at the Christoffelsmühle, Christoffel was later a businessman in the Rhineland. His son was Ernst Jakob Christoffel (1876-1955), who founded the Christian Blind Mission.

=== Famous people associated with the municipality ===
- Karl Bayer (b. 1910 in Theisbergstegen; d. 1972 in Rathsweiler)

Bayer was not only the schoolteacher in Rathsweiler, but during the Second World War he was also an officer and recipient of the Knight's Cross.
