= Ulmet, Germany =

Ulmet
- Municipality
- Coat of arms

- Location of Ulmet within Kusel district
- Interactive map of Ulmet
- Location within Germany Location within Rhineland-Palatinate
- Coordinates: 49°35′08″N 7°27′23″E
- Country: Germany
- State: Rhineland-Palatinate
- District: Kusel
- Municipal assoc.: Kusel-Altenglan

Government
  - Mayor (2019–24): Klaus Klinck

Area
  - Total: 7.10 km^{2} (2.74 sq mi)
- Elevation: 200 m (660 ft)

Population (2025-12-31)
  - Total: 676
  - Density: 95.2/km^{2} (247/sq mi)
- Time zone: UTC+01:00 (CET)
  - Summer (DST): UTC+02:00 (CEST)
- Postal codes: 66887
- Dialling codes: 06387
- Vehicle registration: KUS
- Website: ulmet.de

Ulmet is an Ortsgemeinde – a municipality belonging to a Verbandsgemeinde, a kind of collective municipality – in the Kusel district in Rhineland-Palatinate, Germany. It belongs to the Verbandsgemeinde of Kusel-Altenglan, whose seat is in Kusel. Ulmet has long been a recognized tourism community.

== Geography ==
=== Location ===
The municipality lies on the Glan in the Kusel Musikantenland in the Western Palatinate. The municipal area measures 710 ha, of which 94 ha is wooded. The village lies in the Glan valley overlooking the “Glan Knee”, where the river bends from its northward direction to a northeasterly course. The broad, fertile dale is framed by hills and mountains, which are mostly wooded. The highest elevations are the Steinerner Mann (459 m above sea level) to the west and the Sulzkopf (402 m above sea level) to the south. The floor of the dale lies some 190 m above sea level. In 1836, in his travel observations, Friedrich Blaul wrote of Ulmet: “…The location of the village of Ulmet I prefer to all others. It is characteristic of the whole Glan valley, with regard to both beauty and richness. On a small hill stands a little old Gothic church, surrounded by fertile fields and lovely meadows. Livestock breeding in this exquisite dale is in an excellent state and a Glan cow enjoys before the others of her kind the same advantage as Venus before the Graces.” All together, 164 ha of the municipal area is under Federal ownership as a border strip for the Baumholder troop drilling ground and for a pumping station on the NATO pipeline.

=== Neighbouring municipalities ===
Ulmet borders in the north on the municipality of Rathsweiler, in the northeast on the municipality of Niederalben, in the east on the municipality of Sankt Julian, in the south on the municipalities of Bedesbach and Erdesbach, in the west on the municipality of Oberalben and in the northwest on the Baumholder troop drilling ground.

=== Constituent communities ===
Also belonging to Ulmet are the outlying homesteads of Felschbachhof and Mühlwieshof.

=== Municipality’s layout ===
Today's village is made up of the two formerly self-administering centres of Ulmet, which lay on the Glan's left bank, and Pielsbach on the right bank. Both were clump villages that huddled closely to the Glan and the latter village's namesake Pielsbach. The combined village has only begun to spread away from the Glan in the very latest times with the opening of five new building areas. Ulmet, once a rich farming village, was, before the Thirty Years' War, the biggest municipality in the middle Glan valley, and the governing one, being as it was the seat of an Unteramt. The municipal area reached most of the way to the actual village sites of Erdesbach, Oberalben-Mayweilerhof and Rathsweiler. Ulmet could claim to be the governing centre up until the 19th century. In P. A. Paule's Gemälden aus Rheinbaiern 1817 (“Tableaux from Rhenish Bavaria”), for instance, a population of 495 inhabitants is listed for Ulmet, whereas for the now considerably bigger Altenglan, the figure was only 403. The old overland routes, for the most part dating back to Celtic and Roman times, steered clear of the dales, which were threatened by floods and hostile encroachment, and also offered no clear view. Near Ulmet, two roads met: the army road coming from Kaiserslautern by way of Bosenbach and the Ulmet strip field “Pilgerhausen” and the Roman road coming down from Lichtenberg Castle by way of the Mayweilerhof (estate) to Rathsweiler and running from the Neuwirtshaus (“New Inn”, in Niederalben) by way of Ohlscheid and Schweinschied towards Kreuznach. This road had a branch at the Mayweilerhof leading to Ulmet and the Glan crossing, and farther on to a junction with yet another road that ran north–south.

The municipality offered farming, cropraising and livestock raising all the advantages in earlier times with its relatively vast municipal area, fertile cropland in the east and west and broad meadows in the open Glan valley. Thus, Ulmet grew until the 20th century as a respectable farming village. The extensive loss of lands in the west to the Baumholder troop drilling ground and in the southwest to NATO pipeline compromised agriculture, reducing the amount of land under the plough by 164 ha. This loss, as well as developments in industry and indeed in the era following the Second World War, led to an end for almost all agricultural operations, great and small. Nowadays, there is only one farming family left, mainly in cropraising, working their own land and also great areas of rented land. A few farming operations run as sidelines, but only serve the owners’ needs. One good thing for the land has been the establishment of a shepherds’ club, whose many part-time shepherds, with their small to midsize flocks, are keeping the municipal area's utter reversion to wilderness in check

== History ==
=== Antiquity ===
Two archaeological finds in or near the municipal area bear witness to early human habitation:

- A fragment of a small, four-sided stone axe with the poll missing made of black stone with a length of 2.7 cm was found in the strip field called “Seiters”. It is now kept at the Historisches Museum der Pfalz (Historic Museum of the Palatinate) in Speyer.
- After the Second World War (1948), a prehistoric grave was unearthed in the “Ruth” forest district right near the boundary with the Baumholder troop drilling ground, not far from the Roman road that goes by, below the Wartekopf. It has a diameter of more than 30 m, is round or oval, convex in the middle, and on the now heavily overgrown surface systematically studded with selected, big stones. According to Dr. Sprater, it is a Celtic grave. The Historic Museum in Speyer recorded the find in its register, but the grave complex has not been opened, but rather left in its original state. Many artefacts from Roman times have been found in neighbouring municipal areas. Spolia from Roman times are still preserved in the Evangelical church's masonry

=== Middle Ages ===
Ulmet is one of the oldest places in the Glan area. The first documentary mention came as early as 932 or 952 in the addendum to the Polyptych of St. Remi, in which a place called Kapellen is named. What was meant by this was the Flurskapelle, a chapel that still stands today, then the hub of a great parish. In the early 12th century, the village passed to the County of Veldenz, whose counts exercised the Schutzvogtei over the so-called Remigiusland. In 1444, Count Palatine Stephan of the Palatinate merged Veldenz, some of his own holdings and the County of Zweibrücken to found the new County of Palatinate-Zweibrücken, which was later generally known as a duchy. Ulmet lay within this duchy up until French Revolutionary troops occupied the lands on the Rhine’s left bank, during which time Ulmet, sometimes by itself and sometimes together with Pilsbach across the Glan, was the chief centre of a Zweibrücken Unteramt.

=== Modern times ===
The lordship of the Duchy of Palatinate-Zweibrücken lasted through the Thirty Years' War until the duchy came to an end in the course of the French Revolution. In 1633, during the Thirty Years’ War, there was an engagement at the earthworks in which the Imperial Army's Spanish troops suffered a great onslaught from troops of the Union under command of Rhinegrave Otto, and were thereby forced to withdraw from the Palatinate, and the whole left bank of the Rhine. The Spaniards lost all their baggage in the ordeal, and perhaps worse, 1,500 mercenaries were taken prisoner. In 1635, Ulmet was burnt down by the Imperial Army's Croatian mercenaries. Some of the inhabitants got to safety, along with their clergyman Suevas, at Lichtenberg Castle. All the inhabitants who did not make it to safety inside Lichtenberg Castle were murdered. By the time the war was over, the village was almost empty of people. The population then grew again, but only slowly, mainly by the arrival of newcomers, but also because of the good agricultural conditions. Fate delivered further blows in the late 17th century with King Louis XIV's wars of conquest. Only in the 18th century did an epoch of growth and strength set in, and it was then that the first emigrations were noted. In 1761, a town hall was built. In the wake of the French Revolution and the French annexation of the lands on the Rhine's left bank, the region's administrative structure was altered on 23 January 1798. Most of the Unteramt of Ulmet was assigned to the Department of Sarre, the Arrondissement of Birkenfeld and the Canton of Kusel. Ulmet became the seat of the mairie (“mayoralty”) for the villages of Ulmet, Erdesbach, Oberalben, Rathsweiler, Altenglan, Patersbach, Dennweiler-Frohnbach, Eschenau and Sankt Julian with Obereisenbach.

==== Recent times ====
After Waterloo and the Congress of Vienna, the Palatinate was awarded to the Kingdom of Bavaria. In 1818, two limetrees were planted at the way into the graveyard to mark the occasion of the unification of the Reformed and Lutheran churches. Yet another town hall was built in 1823. In the years 1873 to 1875, Sacred Heart Church (Herz-Jesu-Kirche) was built. The railway came in 1904 with the building of the Glantalbahn. Electricity reached Ulmet in 1923. Flurbereinigung was undertaken between 1968 and 1979. On 1 January 1972, the Bürgermeisterei (“Mayoralty”) of Ulmet was dissolved and in its stead, the Verbandsgemeinde of Altenglan was established.

=== Population development ===
A census from the year 1490 survives and it lists 51 taxpayers for Ulmet (but not the other inhabitants). In 1609, 259 inhabitants were counted. Exact population figures for the time from 1638 to the early 19th century are unavailable. Only in 1802 was another population count and this time there were 362 inhabitants. The rise became continuous, but by the mid 19th century, the effects of emigration to the United States and Southeastern Europe had taken their toll on the population figures, which were now shrinking. Between the end of the Franco-Prussian War and the turn of the 20th century, population growth stagnated as a result of inhabitants moving away to Germany's industrial regions; it was likewise after the First World War. At the last census before the Second World War, Ulmet had 754 inhabitants, and once again, there was an upward trend. Beginning in 1978, there was a temporary drop in population, but this was a bureaucratic illusion, for commuters were counted at their workplaces, not at their homes. This was, however, followed by slight growth in population. With regard to religious affiliation, Protestants were the overwhelming majority in Ulmet. Over time, though, the Catholics managed to increase their percentage of the population slightly. For a time, almost 10% of the inhabitants were Jewish. The Jews’ share of the population, however, had already begun to shrink steadily by the 19th century, mostly owing to migration to the industrial regions.

Before the Thirty Years’ War, Ulmet was the biggest municipality in the middle Glan valley, and it held this distinction into the middle of the 19th century. This can be ascribed exclusively to a sound agricultural economy. Thus, with industry's rise came a loss of status for Ulmet. After the Second World War came a drop in population, due not least of all to young people “fleeing the countryside” (Landflucht in German) and going to the cities. Counting commuters at their workplaces disadvantaged their home communities and weekend commuters’ families’ homes, too, when it came to allocating funds from investment stock and income tax assessment.

Out of what was once purely a farming village with several well-to-do economists and many small farmers, and a relatively high number of craftsmen, grew a residential community for commuters, pensioners and employees in service industry occupations. Even the Flurbereinigung undertaken between 1968 and 1979, which cost a great amount (1,300,000 DM), could not stop agriculture's downward slide. Only one agricultural operation in Ulmet – at an outlying homestead – still raises crops full-time. There are not even many part-time farmers. There was once livestock breeding, but that has been given up.

The following table shows population development since Napoleonic times for Ulmet, with some figures broken down by religious denomination:

Year	1802	1809	1825	1864	1875	1895	1905	1921	1939	1970	1999
Total	362	420	549	606	700	702	716	750	754	876	862
Evangelical			501	575		657			832
Catholic			14	17		38			43
Jewish			34	14		7			—
Other									1

=== Municipality’s name ===
As a Celtic founding, Ulmet bears a name of Celtic origin, like Kusel (Cosla) and Altenglan (Gleni). The name of the river Glan is also of Celtic origin.

In a 1267 document from the Remigiusberg Monastery, the name Ulmet appears for the first time, as Olmone. Other forms of the name that have cropped up over time are Olmut (1364), Olmüth (1387), Olmud (1416), Olmaon, Olmont (1422), Olmudt (1436), Olmut (1446), Ollemont (1456), Olmud and Olmudt (1460), Olmuett (1477), Olmüt (1480), Olmeth (1544), Ulmeth, Ulmüth (1588), again Olmeth (1634), Ulmeth (1756) and beginning about the mid 19th century, with the dropping of the H at the end (which was not pronounced anyway), the modern spelling appeared.

The outlying centre of Pielsbach over on the other side of the Glan was until the 14th century a self-administering municipality. It stretches up its namesake brook, the Pielsbach, back from the Glan, into which the brook empties. Old records show that it was named Pelsbach or Pilsbach (1364), Pelesbach (1381), Pilßbach (1433) and then finally Pielsbach (1585). The like-named brook crops up in records from the years 1585 to 1588, likewise with the name Pielsbach. Writers Dolch and Greule trace the name back to a pre-Germanic waterway name, Pelisa, to which the placename ending —bach was added in German/Germanic times.

=== Vanished villages ===
It is understandable that within the limits of what once was Ulmet's comparatively vast municipal area, villages stood in earlier times that have now vanished. Long before the name Ulmet showed up in documents, the name Flurskappeln did, in the 11th century. It was likely a tiny village, but a village nonetheless, rather than a hamlet, having as it did a church with a rectory, the landlord's house and a servants’ house. It lay in the area where the Flurskapelle, a chapel, still stands today. Furthermore, the well known 1364 Heinrichurkunde (“Henry Document”) mentions Pielsbach (also Pilsbach, Pelsbach), Katzenbach, Pilgershausen, and Trudenberg for the first time. Pielsbach was a separate village, but it was merged into Ulmet during the Middle Ages; it is now described as an Ortsteil. Katzenbach lay near the Glan between Ulmet and Erdesbach; records later named a mill called Katzenbacher Mühle. Pilgershausen lay on the heights northeast of Ulmet, about where the Pilgerhof was founded (sometime after Pilgershausen had vanished). It is, however, hard to say where the village of Trudenberg lay. It must have been between Ulmet and Gumbsweiler, perhaps in the area of today's “Freudenwald”. All these villages had vanished by the time of the Thirty Years' War. It is certain that another centre, Brücken, which lay across the river Glan from Flurskappeln, was obliterated during that war. At one time it had some importance as the seat of a Veldenz Unteramt, and it is now remembered as the scene of the Battle of Brücken. Documents from the 15th and 16th centuries mention vineyards near Brücken.

== Religion ==
Ulmet, with its Flurskapelle, was long before the Reformation already an ecclesiastical hub in the Glan valley. Duke Ludwig II began to introduce the Reformation into the Duchy of Palatinate-Zweibrücken in 1523. Belonging to the reformed parish of Flurskappeln in 1538 were the villages of Brücken (vanished), Dennweiler-Frohnbach, Erdesbach, Erzweiler (forsaken by its last few inhabitants in 1974 after having been incorporated into the Baumholder Troop Drilling Ground by the Nazis in 1933), Gumbsweiler, Oberalben, Pielsbach (now part of Ulmet), Rathsweiler, Ulmet and Welchweiler. In 1609, the parish, with the addition of Huffersweiler (later an outlying centre of Erzweiler), still had its old extent. From 1639 to 1671, Altenglan together with Bedesbach (with the vanished village of Sulzbach) and Friedelhausen, were united with Ulmet. From 1639 to 1652, Patersbach, too, was served from Ulmet. The reformed parish belonged originally to the Inspection of Lichtenberg, but passed to the Inspection of Limbach in 1815 and to the deaconry of Kusel in 1820. Over the course of the last two centuries, the following places have split away from the parish of Ulmet: Erzweiler (1816), Gumbsweiler (1820), Dennweiler-Frohnbach (1909), Oberalben (1920) and Welchweiler (1956), leaving only Ulmet, Erdesbach and Rathsweiler in the parish today.

The Flurskapelle is a so-called Feldkirche, a “field church”, one that stands outside any village or town, in the countryside. They once served several villages as a parish church. This one was built in 1091, making it one of the oldest churches in the Glan valley. All that is now left of the original building is the Romanesque tower. The nave that stands now is the third one on this spot. In 1124, the church had its first documentary mention in a document from the Remigiusberg Monastery as Capella, although it had been mentioned before this, but in records that could not be precisely dated, even in the Polyptych of the Abbey of Saint-Remi in Reims. Hanging in the tower are two bronze bells. The bigger one was poured in 1469, weighs 550 kg and has a lower diameter of 97 cm. The smaller bell was poured in 1743, weighs 255 kg and has a diameter of 78 cm. Because of their great age, both bells escaped the fate of so many churchbells in the two world wars, which were taken away to be melted down for their metal. Since 1953, the church, along with the graveyard around it with the two limetrees planted at the entrance in 1818 on the occasion of the union of the Reformed and Lutheran churches, has been under protection as a natural and cultural monument. Buried at the Flurskapelle graveyard were the dead from the villages of Ulmet, Rathsweiler, Erzweiler, Gumbsweiler, Welchweiler, Erdesbach, Oberalben with Mayweilerhof and Frohnbach with Frohnbacherhof, which all belonged to the parish. Over the centuries, almost all these villages split away from this group once they had their own graveyards. Nowadays, only the dead from Ulmet and Rathsweiler are buried in Ulmet's graveyard.

Even though the number of Catholics in Ulmet was quite small, building work on Sacred Heart Church (Herz-Jesu-Kirche), a small Catholic church for worshippers from many surrounding villages, began in 1873. It stands on a small hill north of the village. The foundation stone was laid on 7 July 1873, the first bell was hung on 27 June 1875 and the festive consecration took place on 10 August 1875.

== Politics ==
=== Municipal council ===
The council is made up of 12 council members, who were elected by majority vote at the municipal election held on 7 June 2009, and the honorary mayor as chairman.

=== Mayor ===
Ulmet's mayor is Klaus Klinck.

=== Coat of arms ===
The German blazon reads: Durch einen blauen Wellenbalken von Silber und Gold geteilt, oben ein schreitender rotbewehrter und -bezungter blauer Löwe, unten die verschlungenen Großbuchstaben A und U.

The municipality's arms might in English heraldic language be described thus: A barrulet wavy azure between argent a lion passant of the first armed and langued gules and Or the letter A surmounted by the letter U, both of the second.

An 18th-century seal from Ulmet is known – the earliest example stems from 1753 – but it represents not the village, but rather the Amt. The seal displays the overlapped letters A and V, an abbreviation for Am(b)t Vlmet. These same letters now appear in almost the same shape as charges in Ulmet's coat of arms (although the blazon says that the one on top is supposed to be a U rather than a V). The tinctures in this lower half of the escutcheon were simply chosen by the municipality and have no historical significance. The tinctures in the escutcheon's upper half, on the other hand, are the ones that the Counts of Veldenz used for their heraldic lion. The wavy barrulet (thin horizontal stripe) stands for the river Glan. The arms have been borne since 4 April 1979 when they were approved by the now abolished Regierungsbezirk administration in Neustadt an der Weinstraße.

== Culture and sightseeing ==
=== Buildings ===
The following are listed buildings or sites in Rhineland-Palatinate’s Directory of Cultural Monuments:

- Bahnhofstraße 11 – former railway station; sandstone-framed rusticated building, one-floor storage hall with loading ramp, one-and-a-half-floor lavatory and stable shed, 1904
- Meisenheimer Straße 21/25 – Protestant rectory; building with hipped roof, 1783, architect Friedrich Gerhard Wahl, Zweibrücken
- Meisenheimer Straße – so-called Kappeler Brücke; three-arched sandstone bridge with two starlings, 1784–1786, architect Peter Bell, Kusel
- Holy Cross Catholic Church (Kirche Heilig Kreuz), Meisenheimer Straße 43 – stone-block aisleless church with ridge turret, sacristy addition, 1873/1874, architect Father Heimy, Brücken; two bells: 1774 by Johann Nerger and 1874
- Protestant parish church, Meisenheimer Straße 52 – Romanesque west tower, about 1115, Baroque tent roof; Baroque aisleless church, 1737/1738; two bells: 1469 by Johann Otto, Kaiserslautern and 1743; Stumm organ from 1847; tomb, late 19th century by August Drumm
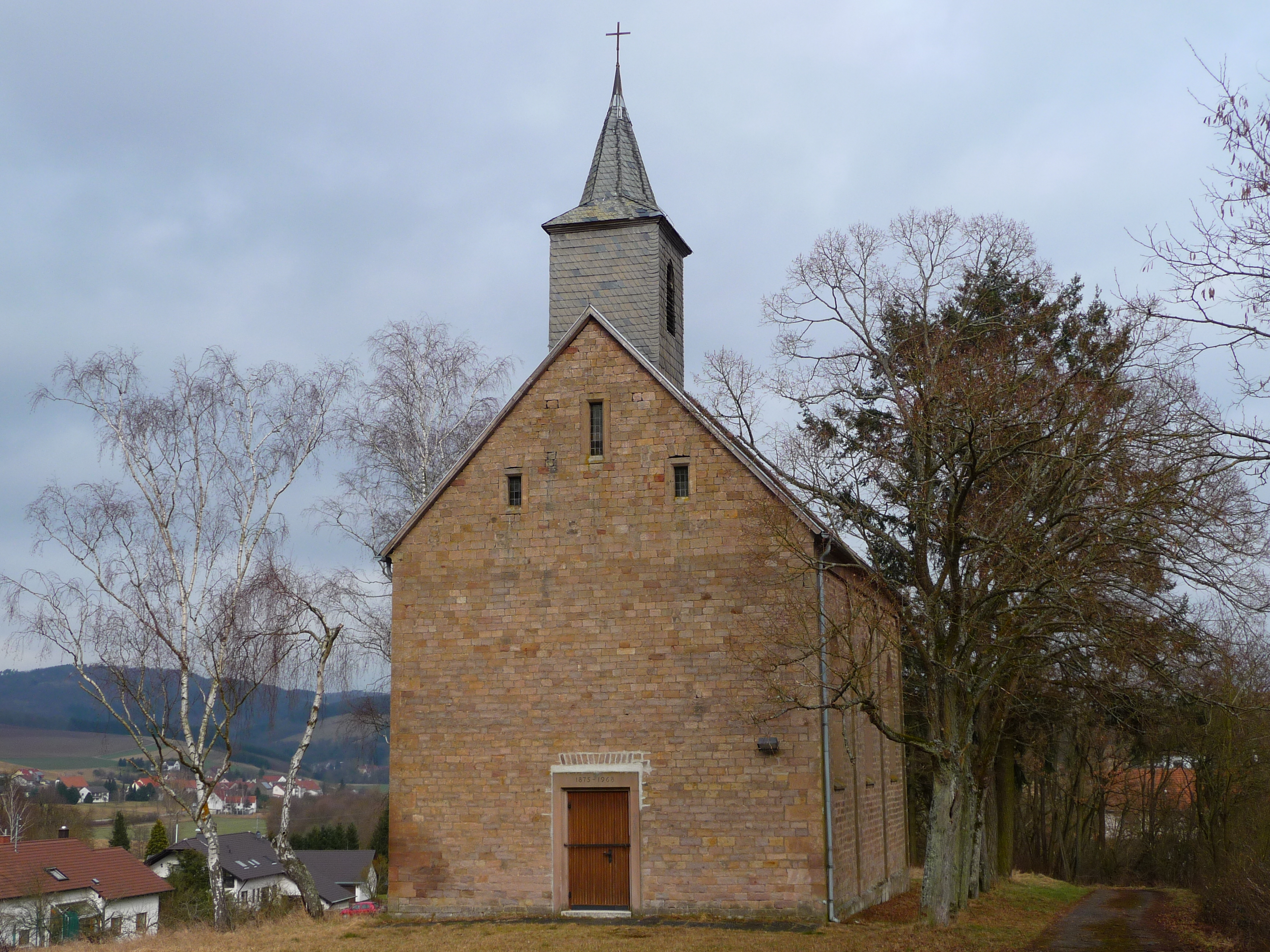
Meisenheimer Straße 43: Holy Cross Catholic Church

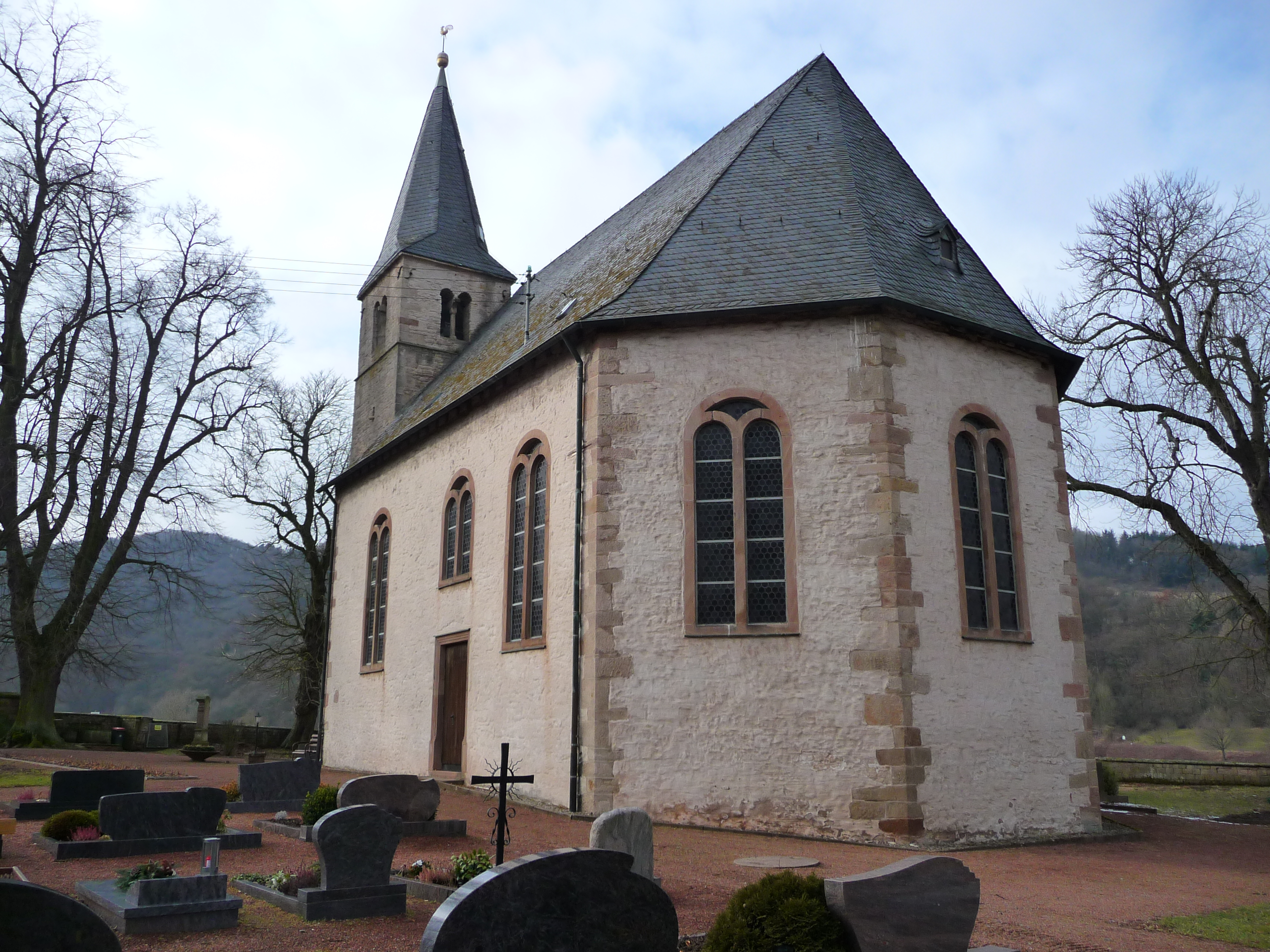
Meisenheimer Straße 52: Protestant parish church (Flurskapelle)

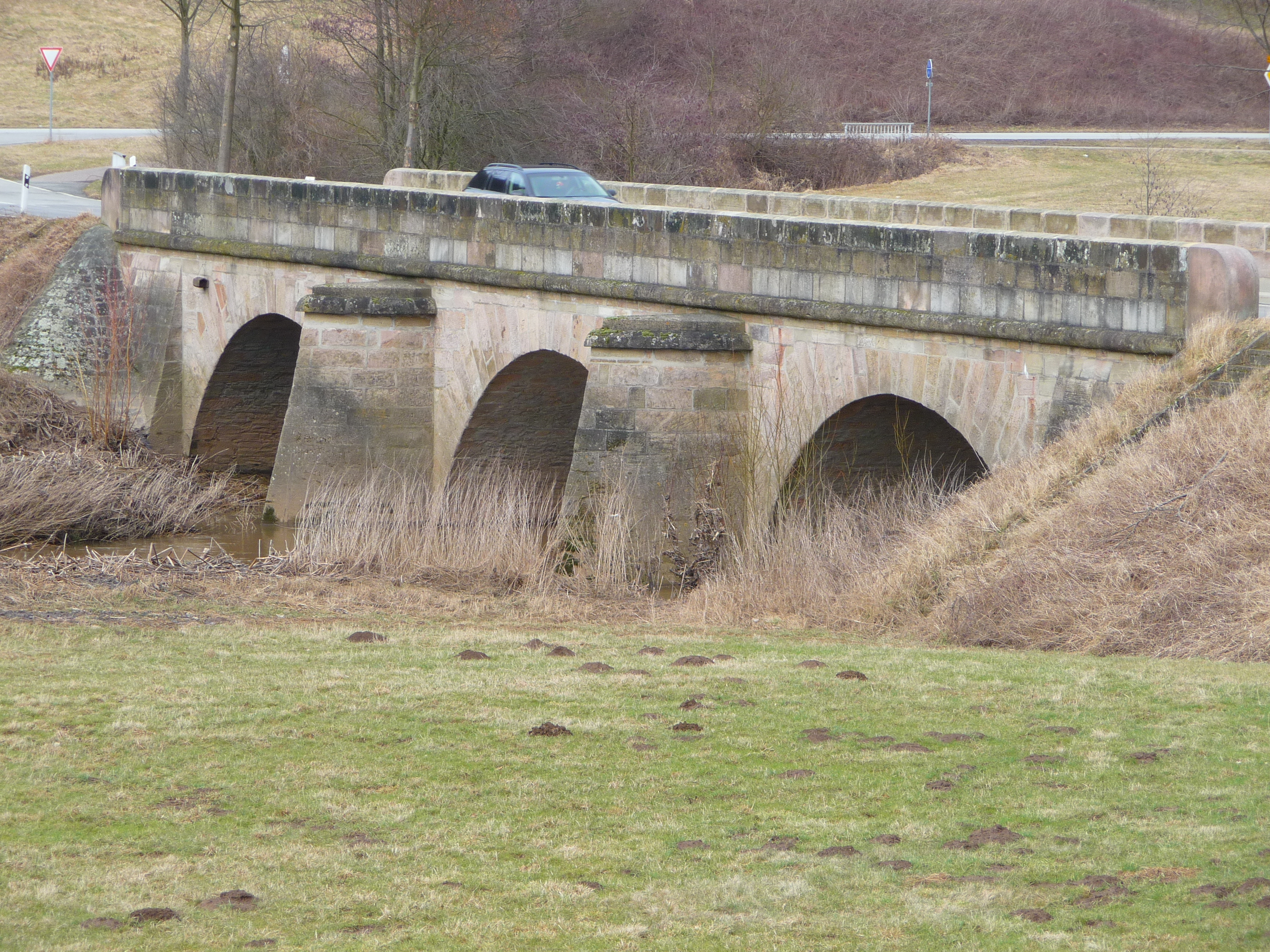
Meisenheimer Straße: so-called Kappeler Brücke

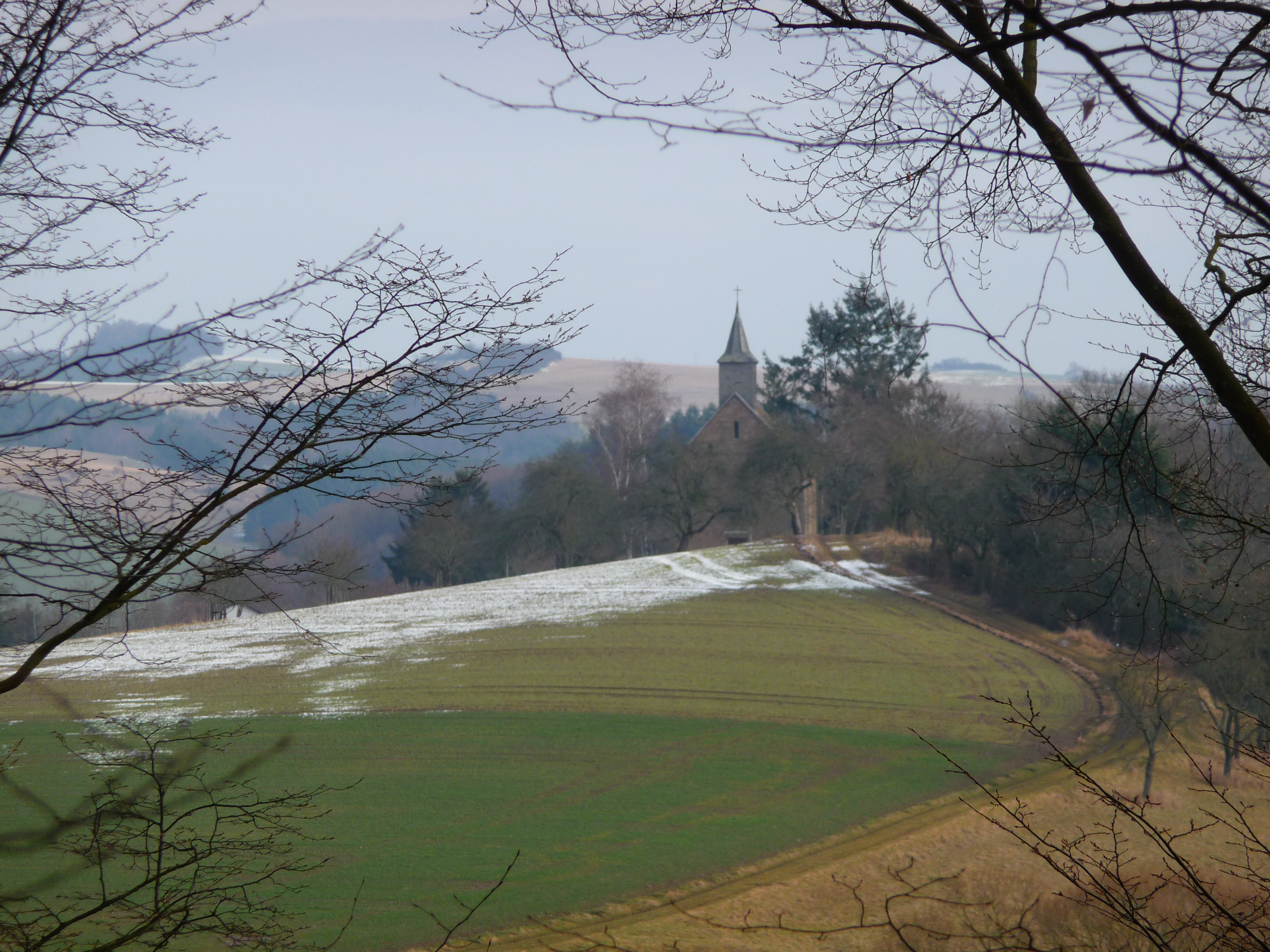
Flurskapelle

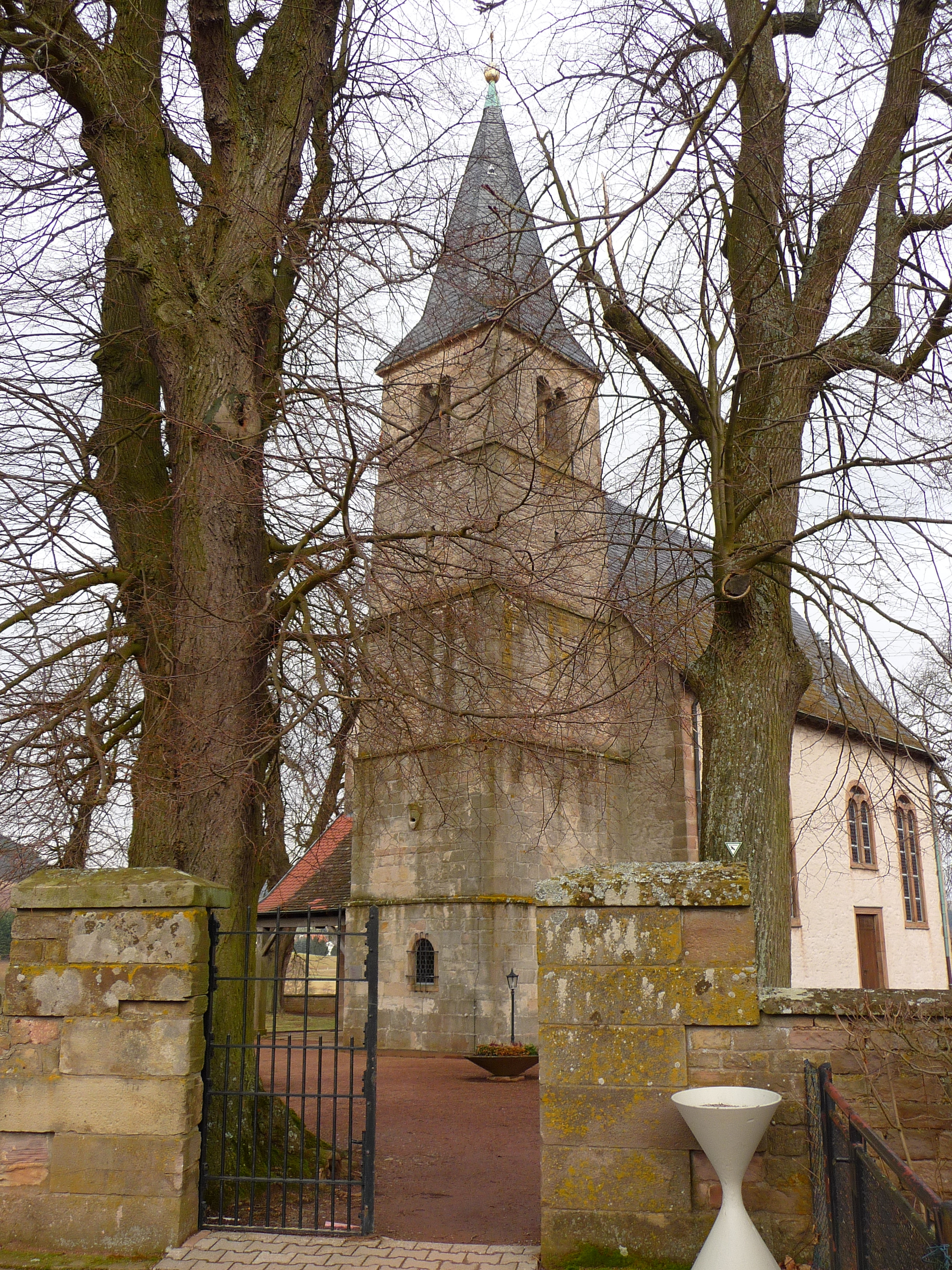
Flurskapelle

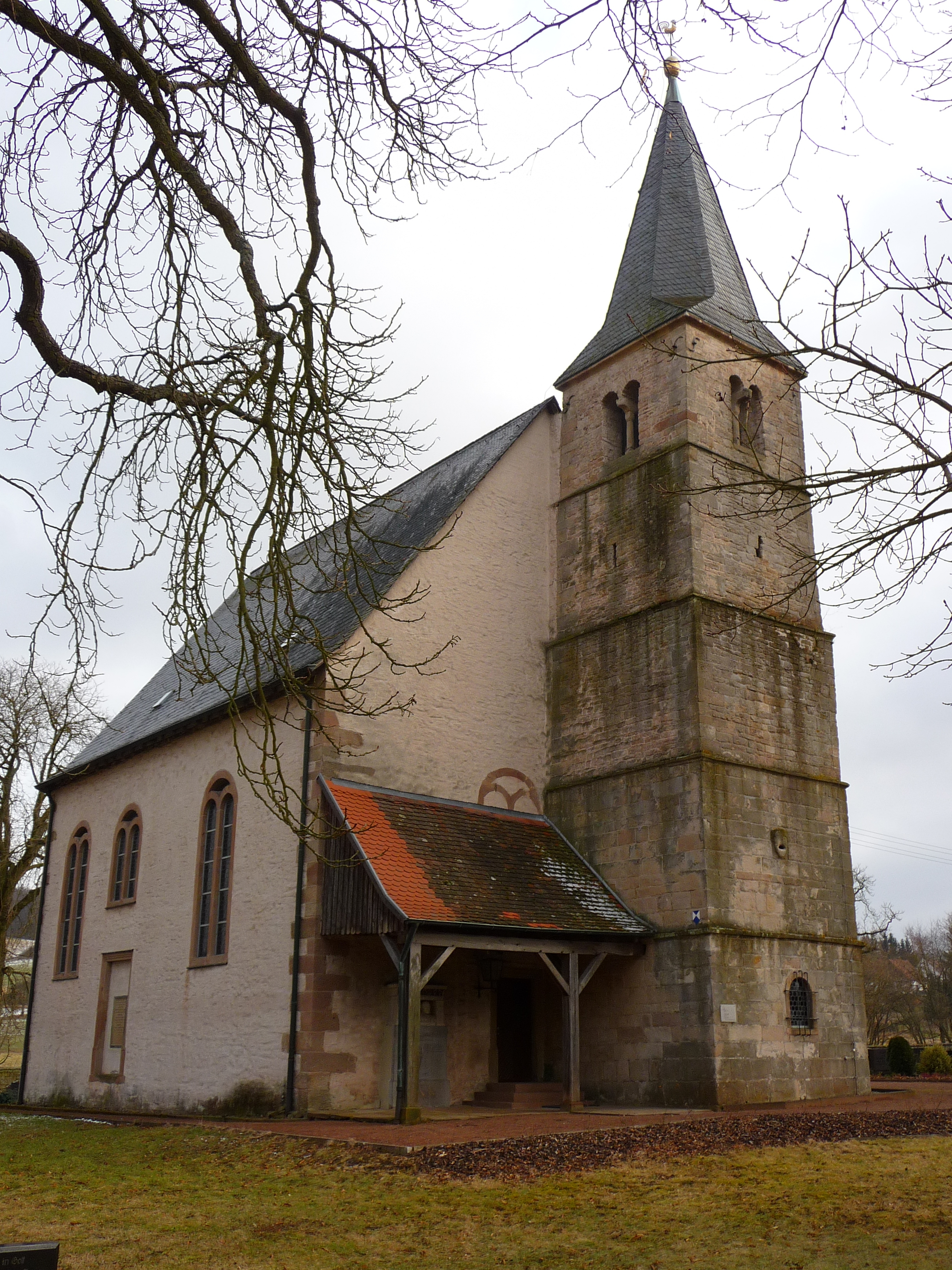
Flurskapelle

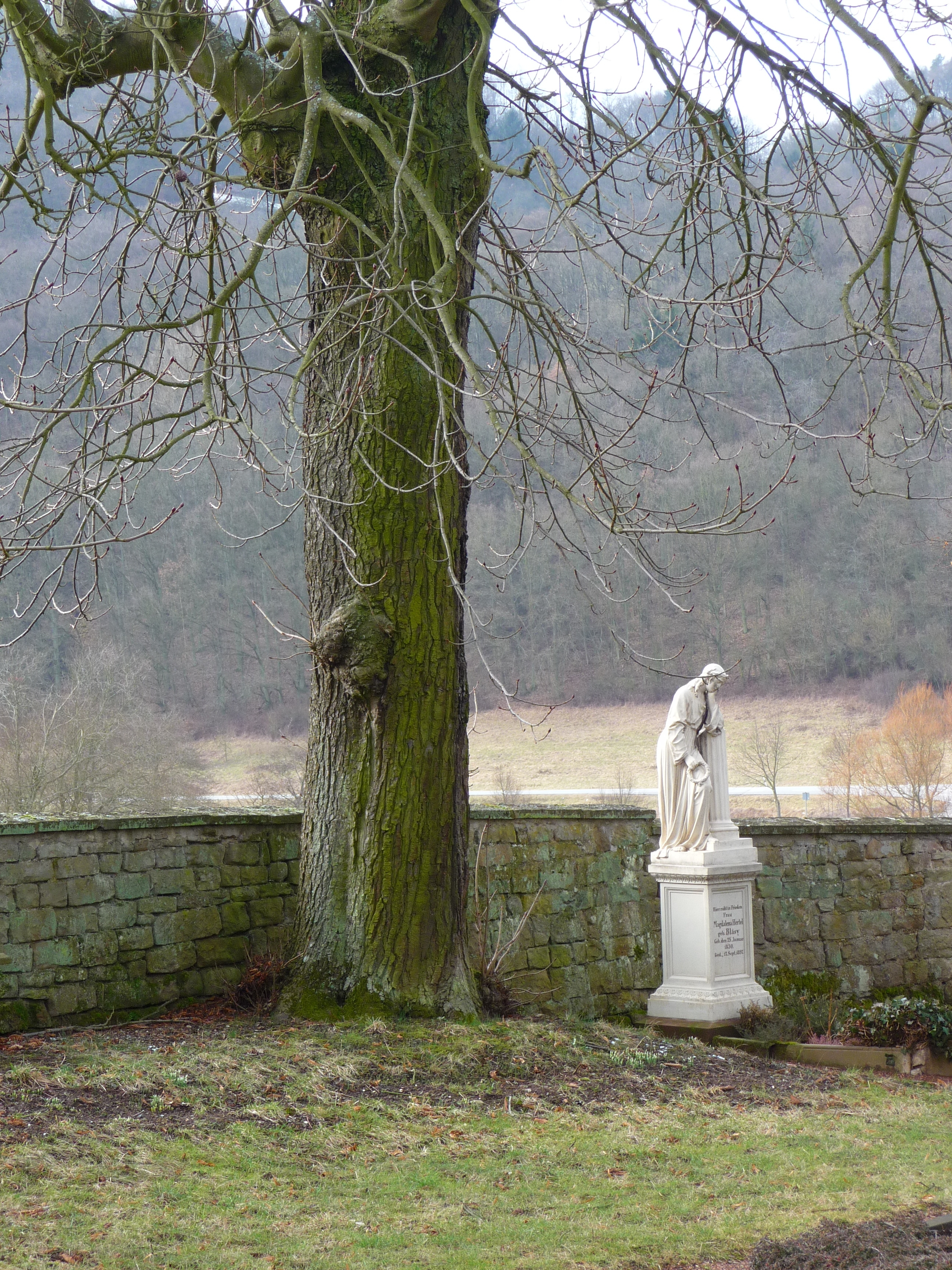
Old graveyard

The Kappeler Brücke was first mentioned in 1542. The newer bridge of 1748 fell victim to the Great Flood of 1784. The replacement built shortly thereafter has stood until the present day.

An 8 km-long educational path about the area's bodies of water – the Gewässerlehrpfad – runs from Ulmet to Erdesbach.

=== Natural monuments ===
The limetrees (or lindens, as trees of the genus Tilia are also known) growing on the way into the old graveyard are considered natural monuments.

=== Regular events ===
For centuries now, Ulmet has been celebrating the Gallusfest from Tuesday to Thursday after Saint Gall’s Day (16 October), one of the Palatinate’s oldest folk festivals. Formerly, all the villages that belonged to the greater parish of Ulmet celebrated this festival, but these other centres have, since splitting away from Ulmet, paid tribute to modern times, and they hold their kermises (church consecration festivals, locally known as the Kerwe) on summertime weekends. Only Ulmet has kept the old tradition of the Gallusfest. Even Billigheim, which once held its Purzelmarkt, which was just as old, on the same days as Ulmet’s Gallusfest, has moved its festival to a weekend in the warmer months. Even if “Saint Gall’s Market” no longer holds the same meaning for the country folk that it once did, still a few thousand visitors come to the old Glan village to celebrate with friends, acquaintances and kin.

Popularity has been earned lately by the Hammelfest (“Mutton Festival”), held since 1981 on the second weekend in August. One can see from the licences borne by the cars parked at the fairground that visitors come from the whole Palatinate, the Saarland and the Frankfurt Rhine Main Region to this festival to pay their respects to the Schafhalterverein Mittleres Glantal (“Middle Glan Valley Shepherds’ Association”) and the Tourism Municipality of Ulmet with its known dining establishments and inns.

The Village Festival (Dorffest), held on the third weekend in June on the marketplace before the Gallushalle, supposedly retains its unhurried character without having succumbed to modern hype. The marketplace is set up in a visitor-friendly way with booths occupied by the local clubs. Eating, drinking, Gemütlichkeit, jollity, music and song contribute to the entertainment, and promote the sense of community in the village.

On Whitsunday, the Evangelical parish celebrates its yearly parish festival at the rectory and the parish hall. Showing up here for the festivities, food and drink are not only the local parishioners but also guests from outside.

For more than two decades, the angling sport club Angelfreunde have been holding their now well known Fischerfest at their clubhouse on the “Rotenhöh” (cadastral area).

=== Clubs ===
- Angling sport club (founded in 1968)
- Countrywomen's club (founded in 1952)
- Evangelical women's league (founded in 1928)
- “Germania” singing club (municipality's oldest club, founded in 1862)
- Gymnastic club (founded in 1863/1981)
- Local history club (founded in 1950)
- Middle Glan Valley Shepherds’ Association (founded in 1980)
- Nursing association (founded in 1949)
- Reservists’ fellowship
- Sport club (founded in 1919)
- Tennis club (founded in 1978)
- Youth wind orchestra (founded in 1967)

== Economy and infrastructure ==
=== Economic structure ===
Ulmet was up until Weimar times the hub for surrounding villages as seat of first the Schultheiß and then later the mayoralty. A great number of craft and other businesses could be found in the village. First and foremost, however, the village was characterized by agriculture and livestock breeding with its great, fertile municipal area. In the course of industrialization, a brickworks (1890), a tannery (1872) and a machine factory (1853) located in the village in the latter half of the 19th century. The last-named business experienced a boomtime in the First World War as it manufactured weapons and munitions, employing up to 70 workers. After the war, though, it was limited to dealing in and repairing machines and devices for agriculture and business. Their own patents for machines of the most varied kinds went unused. The business failed in 1985, as had likewise the tannery in 1957, which had made mostly upper leather and sole leather. The brickworks had gone out of business even earlier – in 1918.

After 1945, almost all business was disrupted, and even agriculture came to an end. Currently, Ulmet has only one full-time agricultural operation, and the number of part-time operations can be counted on one hand. There was a great “flight from the countryside” (Landflucht). Many younger inhabitants, seeking livelihoods and work in their chosen fields, moved away to the industrial centres. Those left behind sought work with the NATO forces stationed in Germany or with the Bundeswehr in Kusel, Baumholder, Ramstein and Kaiserslautern. Many skilled workers commute daily to jobs in the neighbouring Saarland and even as far as Ludwigshafen, Mannheim or Heidelberg. Today Ulmet is a residential community for workers and employees. As a result of the municipality's recognition as a tourism community, an exemplary dining scene with attendant lodging offerings has arisen. The opening of a commercial park has allowed a few craft businesses to locate in Ulmet, and the opening of several new building areas has allowed about 50 young families to move to the village.

=== Transport ===
What is now Bundesstraße 420 was built in the 19th century as a Staatsstraße (State Road). It formerly led right through the village, rich as it was in bottlenecks, but was, with the inhabitants’ blessing, realigned in 1937/1938 by the Nazis in the course of fortifying the Third Reich's western border (Siegfried Line), so that it now bypasses the village. The road passing through the village was then reclassified as Kreisstraße (District Road) 29. After the Second World War, the Kusel district expanded the farm lane that led to the Mayweilerhof into the new Kreisstraße 25, with an extension going by way of Blaubach through to Kusel. To Ulmet's southwest lies the Autobahn A 62 (Kaiserslautern–Trier).

The railway, which in Imperial times had been a strategic line, was built from 1902 to 1904. The first train on this line ran on 1 May 1904. The line between Staudernheim and Altenglan no longer has any importance, with the last of the self-powered passenger trains running on the Glantalbahn on Friday 31 May 1985; goods transport also came to an end that same summer. Shortly thereafter, one of the two tracks was torn up, and even its ballast was removed, too. The railway station along with part of the railway property was sold into private ownership in 1995. Since 2000, visitors have been able to ride draisines on the Glantalbahn – one of the two tracks is still there – between Altenglan and Staudernheim, which has led to an upturn in the tourist trade. Part of the Glantalbahn is still in operation, and indeed the nearest station is the one in Altenglan.

=== Education ===
As early as 1559, the first Reformed pastor who was active in Ulmet, Anton Priol (also called “the Great Priol”), built the parish school in Ulmet. Indeed, it was one of the first schools for miles around. The first teacher was the pastor's son, Abraham. All children from the villages that then belonged to the parish attended this school in Ulmet. The schoolhouse stood across from the rectory, to the right of the graveyard entrance, and was also the teacher's house. In 1624, the parish acquired a little house for 200 Gulden, in which classes were also held. The house's whereabouts are now unknown, but it must have been in Pielsbach. In 1778, the Kusel church administration built the Altes Schulhaus (“Old Schoolhouse”, also called Unteres Schulhaus locally, or “Lower Schoolhouse”) with a teacher's dwelling built in on Theodor-Zink-Straße. In 1865, the municipality had an extra floor built onto the house to make more room for teaching and dwelling purposes. It was in this house that the well known Palatine local historian Theodor Zink, whose father was then the schoolteacher, was born in 1871. Until 1843, Ulmet had only a one-room schoolhouse. The steadily rising number of schoolchildren, though, demanded further room for schooling. The new town hall built in 1823 was converted for this purpose and was thereafter known as Die große Schule (“The Great School”).

Even before the First World War, the school's two locations were not adequate to their task. This stemmed from several factors, such as the addition of the eighth grade level, the rise in the general population (and therefore in the number of schoolchildren) and the lack of any schoolyard at either building. It was, however, a long time before anything was done about this. The new school was opened in 1958 in the village's north end, but the eight grade levels together could only use this school for a short time. Under the 1974 School Law, the old Volksschule was replaced with the Grund- und Hauptschule. Ulmet became the seat of the Grundschule Ulmet/Erdesbach, with two classes sharing each of two schools in Erdesbach and Ulmet. Since 2000, all primary classes are together at the Ulmet schoolhouse, which now also has a kindergarten built onto it serving Ulmet, Erdesbach, Niederalben and Rathsweiler.

== Famous people ==
=== Sons and daughters of the town ===
- Theodor Zink (b. 24 September 1871 in Ulmet; d. October 1934 in Kaiserslautern) founder of the Theodor-Zink-Museum in Kaiserslautern
