= Niederalben =

- Municipality
- Coat of arms

- Location of Niederalben within Kusel district
- Interactive map of Niederalben
- Location within Germany Location within Rhineland-Palatinate
- Coordinates: 49°36′24″N 7°28′01″E
- Country: Germany
- State: Rhineland-Palatinate
- District: Kusel
- Municipal assoc.: Kusel-Altenglan

Government
  - Mayor (2019–24): Michael Rihlmann

Area
  - Total: 3.24 km^{2} (1.25 sq mi)
- Elevation: 210 m (690 ft)

Population (2025-12-31)
  - Total: 325
  - Density: 100/km^{2} (260/sq mi)
- Time zone: UTC+01:00 (CET)
  - Summer (DST): UTC+02:00 (CEST)
- Postal codes: 66887
- Dialling codes: 06387
- Vehicle registration: KUS

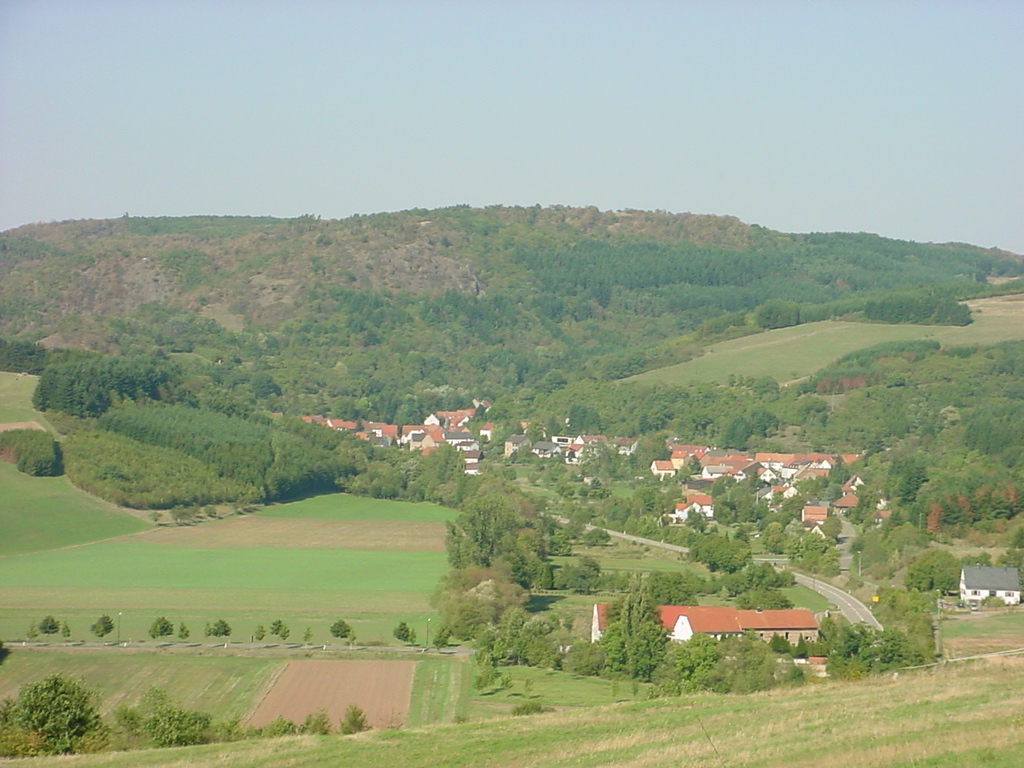
Niederalben

Niederalben is an Ortsgemeinde – a municipality belonging to a Verbandsgemeinde, a kind of collective municipality – in the Kusel district in Rhineland-Palatinate, Germany. It belongs to the Verbandsgemeinde of Kusel-Altenglan, whose seat is in Kusel.

== Geography ==
=== Location ===
The municipality lies in the Steinalb valley in the Western Palatinate. The municipal area is 72.7% wooded. Niederalben lies at an elevation of between 180 and 250 m above sea level on the Steinalb's left bank. This brook empties into the Glan only a few hundred metres downstream from the village. Running alongside the brook is a village bypass.

The streets within the village itself sprout off the original through road that the bypass has now replaced and lead into the little side dales. Elevations outside the village reach heights of greater than 400 m above sea level. Among the more noteworthy of these is the Mittagsfels, with its craggy steep slopes looming over the built-up area.

The Glan and Steinalb valleys are rather narrow, and on either side, a broad plateau spreads out. Two thirds of the former municipal area (before 1938) today lies within the Baumholder Troop Drilling Ground, a military facility created by the Nazis.

=== Neighbouring municipalities ===
Niederalben borders in the north on the Baumholder Troop Drilling Ground, in the east on the municipality of Sankt Julian, in the south on the municipality of Ulmet and in the west on the municipality of Rathsweiler.

=== Constituent communities ===
Also belonging to Niederalben is the outlying homestead of Neuwirtshaus.

=== Municipality’s layout ===
Niederalben's appearance is characterized by its topographical location. The street with the newer houses runs parallel to the Steinalb, right near which building was formerly avoided owing to the flooding danger. In the narrow side dales, two centres have formed, called Oberdorf and Unterdorf ("upper village" and "lower village"). Where the two side dales meet stands the old village church. Nearby stands the Evangelical parish hall, which long served as a stand-in church, although the old church has now been properly renovated and now once more fulfils its original purpose.

The trend towards "modernity" claimed many old farmhouses in the rush to convert existing properties, often radically, into modern dwellings, but nowadays the trend is more towards striving to preserve older building forms. The municipality has become almost wholly a residential community, a great shift from its former function as a pure farming village. In 1994, the phenological weather station run by the German Weather Service in Offenbach was closed after having existed since the end of the Second World War. In the 19th and early 20th centuries, the municipality had a vast woodland in the Steinalb area that was tended by the municipality's own forester. This forest, along with a great part of the old municipal area, now belongs to the Baumholder Troop Drilling Ground, a big restricted area, and is now tended by the state forest administration in Baumholder.

A forester's house for the Steinalb area long stood in Niederalben, but this has since been sold. The main farming lands are found on the high plateau on either side of the dale. The greater part of the municipal woodland now found in what is left of the municipal area was planted after the Second World War. Within the municipal area lie two nature conservation areas, "Mittagsfels" with its dry grassland and rare flora, and "Steinalbmündung", a bird conservation area.

== History ==
=== Antiquity ===
Prehistoric archaeological finds within Niederalben's current limits are not directly established. Right at the municipal limit, however, in the cadastral area known as Schwarzland, now inside the Baumholder Troop Drilling Ground, two urn graves were unearthed in 1938 from La Tène times (about 500 BC). The urns along with grave goods were handed over to the monument office in Trier that was then responsible for such things.

Prehistoric hammerstones have been found in within Niederalben's limits. The broader area around the village, too, is quite rich in prehistoric finds from the Middle and New Stone Age. Already in prehistoric times, there were linking trails over the heights leading towards Trier, and later, a Roman road ran through what is now the municipal area. Finds from Roman times have not turned up in Niederalben. It is likely that the area originally lay in the Lautern royal forest, but did not belong to the lands that Frankish kings donated to ecclesiastical lordships such as the Bishopric of Verdun or the Bishopric of Reims.

=== Middle Ages ===
In 1287, Hunhausen (see vanished villages below) had its first documentary mention. About 1290, a document mentioned a man named Wilmar Vilemann von Alben, who may well have been the first in a line of lesser noblemen of the house of Alben, who in the Late Middle Ages held important offices under Emperor Sigismund in Vienna and Hungary. His significance is that his noble house, "Alben", bears the same name as the village, although the latter also bears the prefix Nieder— ("Nether" or "Lower"). Johann von Agram from the German noble family of Alben became Chancellor of Fünfkirchen, and his brother became Bishop of Fünfkirchen. One of the first written records about the area is a Weistum (a Weistum – cognate with English wisdom – was a legal pronouncement issued by men learned in law in the Middle Ages and early modern times) from the Hochgericht auf der Heide ("High Court on the Heath") to which a letter of enfeoffment refers as early as 1351.

The High Court on the Heath – a geographical area as well as an actual court – was the land between the Steinalb, the Glan and the Nahe, which in the late 10th century became more heavily settled, as witnessed in documents from both Emperor Otto III and Archbishop Willigis of Mainz. It is likely that the area later passed to the Electorate of the Palatinate as an Imperial pledge, and was then transferred by that state to the Waldgraves and Rhinegraves of Steinkallenfels and Grumbach, along with the high court jurisdiction.

Already by Ottonian times, the area was no longer held by the kingly treasury anyway. In a directory of fiefs from about 1200 for the Rhinegrave Wolfram, it says: "Item de Abbate de Sancto Albano habet Ringravius in feodo Helbach und Wiselbach apud Winterhuche, duas villas cum omni iure." This text in somewhat fractured Mediaeval Latin – it even has the German word und thrown in – roughly translates as "Likewise from Saint Alban’s Abbey, the Rhinegrave has in fief Helbach and Wiselbach near Winterhuche, two estates with all rights." The high court jurisdiction in the region of the High Court on the Heath was never challenged. In 1429, the Waldgraves and Rhinegraves enfeoffed a man named Johann von Hagen with the villages and courts of Alben, Nyderalben and Hunehausen. Here, the name Alben was used for a place that still exists now, part of Niederalben, and today customarily called the Oberdorf ("upper village").

=== Modern times ===
In the 16th century, Niederalben – here meaning only the part today customarily called the Unterdorf ("lower village") – passed to the Lords of Groroth. The Lords of Hagen owned 18 house-based persons while the Lords of Groroth owned eight or nine in what were then the two villages. In 1650, the rights held by the Lords of Groroth passed back to the Rhinegraves. In 1791, the last Lord of Hagen died, and thus Niederalben likewise passed back to the Rhinegraves.

==== Recent times ====
During the time of the French Revolution and the Napoleonic era that followed, the German lands on the Rhine’s left bank were annexed by France. Niederalben found itself within the French state in 1801. With the new political arrangement and within the new boundaries, Niederalben found itself in the Canton of Grumbach, the Arrondissement of Birkenfeld and the Department of Sarre. After French rule, the Congress of Vienna drew new boundaries yet again. In 1816, Niederalben passed to the Principality of Lichtenberg, a newly created exclave of the Duchy of Saxe-Coburg-Saalfeld, which in 1826 became the Duchy of Saxe-Coburg and Gotha. As part of this state, it passed in 1834 by sale to the Kingdom of Prussia, which made this area into the Sankt Wendel district. Later, after the First World War, the Treaty of Versailles stipulated, among other things, that 26 of the Sankt Wendel district’s 94 municipalities had to be ceded to the British- and French-occupied Saar. The remaining 68 municipalities then bore the designation "Restkreis St. Wendel-Baumholder", with the first syllable of Restkreis having the same meaning as in English, in the sense of "left over". Niederalben belonged to this district until 1937, when it was transferred to the Birkenfeld district, which had formerly been under Oldenburg administration. After Adolf Hitler’s downfall and Germany's defeat in the Second World War, the municipality was grouped into the then newly founded (1946) state of Rhineland-Palatinate, all the while still in the Birkenfeld district, but now also in the Regierungsbezirk of Koblenz. In the course of administrative restructuring in the state, Niederalben passed to the Regierungsbezirk of Rheinhessen-Pfalz, and in 1969, it was transferred, this time to the Kusel district, in which it remains today. In 1972, Niederalben was grouped as an Ortsgemeinde into the Verbandsgemeinde of Altenglan. In 1974, the village bypass was built.

=== Population development ===
In 1429, twenty-seven house-based persons were counted in what is now Niederalben. Going by this figure, the total population was some 200 inhabitants. In the Thirty Years' War and French King Louis XIV's wars of conquest, there was great loss of life. Nevertheless, by the 18th century the population had grown roughly threefold over what it had been in the 15th, first with new settlers after the war and then strong growth. This made many inhabitants in the 19th century choose emigration. In 1833, there were 526 persons living in Niederalben in 87 families. Among the adults were 131 men and 161 women, while among the children were 161 boys and 103 girls. Seven people lived outside the village. By religion, 449 inhabitants were Evangelical and 70 Catholic. There were no Jews, nor were there any Mennonites.

In the late 19th century, and in the earlier half of the 20th, the population had evened off to a level of 500 inhabitants. Between 1945 and 1950 came a noticeable upswing from 520 to 575 inhabitants, brought about by ethnic Germans driven out of Germany's former eastern territories and people who had fled East Germany arriving in Niederalben. Between 1950 and 1960, the population grew at first only slowly, and then abruptly dropped off to about 500. Many of those who had been forced to come here left again seeking places with better industrial structure. Even young people had no job opportunities.

In 1996, the village had only 400 inhabitants, of whom almost a fourth were over 60 years of age. Also counted in that total are asylum seekers with many children. By 2007, the population had further fallen to 343. Many people in the last century were employed on the Baumholder Troop Drilling Ground, but it must be borne in mind that this is being dissolved bit by bit. Thus, the population might yet further shrink. For decades now, young people have had to seek their livelihoods elsewhere, in other regions.

The following table shows population development over the centuries for Niederalben:

| Year | 1815 | 1860 | 1900 | 1925 | 1958 | 2007 |
| Total | 356 | 583 | 478 | 518 | 564 | 343 |

=== Municipality’s name ===
The placename is geographical in origin, and has to do with the village lying on the brook. According to many interpretations, the name Alb comes from the pre-Germanic name for a body of water, Alba. According to another theory, the name goes back to the customary Allemanic word for a brook, Alb. In contrast to Niederalben, which lies on the Steinalb, Oberalben lies up in the headwaters of another brook named Alb, namely the Kuralb. Since the name Alben is commonly encountered in the surrounding area, it can be difficult to reckon which is which in old documents. According to researchers Dolch and Greule, Niederalben had its first documentary mention in 1290.

=== Vanished villages ===
The villages of Ohlscheid and Hunhausen have not been mentioned in documents since the late 16th century, and their municipal areas were long ago absorbed into Niederalben's. Many rural cadastral toponyms still recall these two villages, which once, like Niederalben, belonged to the Vierherrengericht ("Four-Lord Court") of Sankt Julian and also to the Hochgericht auf der Heide ("High Court on the Heath"). Ohlscheid lay on the ridge between Niederalben and Sankt Julian. Hunhausen, also called Hanhausen, might have been the seat of a "Hun" or "Hund". The term refers to the function borne by a lower administrative official. This village likely lay on the Glan's not very steep left bank between Niederalben and Eschenau (one of Sankt Julian's constituent communities).

== Religion ==
Niederalben's old village church comes from the 14th century and, according to some stories at least, was once Ulfilaskapelle ("Ulfilas’s Chapel"). In 1588, though, Johannes Hofmann mentioned a chapel called Sankt Wolfgang to which "great pilgrimage from faraway foreign lands took place". This church might not have been exactly the same one as today's village church, and Saint Wolfgang's patronage may actually have applied to a now long vanished pilgrimage church that stood on a slope in the village's south end and that may have been destroyed in a landslide. According to Hofmann's description, it stood "forward on the Steinalb, right on the way that goes from Ulmet towards Meisenheim." This meant the ancient road link running from Rathsweiler, by the former federal forestry office and on to Eschenau (an outlying centre of Sankt Julian).

During renovations at the still preserved village church, an expert opinion yielded a date of 1347 (give or take 8 years) for the felling of the timbers used for the roof. It is to be assumed that Niederalben was from the beginning a branch of the parish of Sankt Julian. In 1556, the Counts of Grumbach introduced Lutheran belief. The nave was destroyed during the Thirty Years' War. For a long time, there were no services at the church, and Protestants had to attend church services in neighbouring Sankt Julian. In 1772, the nave was renovated in Late Baroque style, and then there could once more be church services in the village. In 1816 came a new arrangement, for Sankt Julian had become, under the Congress of Vienna, Bavarian.

The Evangelical believers at first attended services at the Church of Offenbach am Glan. In 1839, a parish of Niederalben-Erzweiler was founded, which de jure still exists today. The other place that belonged to the parish, Erzweiler, which lay within the Baumholder Troop Drilling Ground, was permanently dissolved about 1970 (after not having existed anyway for well over three decades). For a while beginning in 1970, there was joint parochial leadership by the pastors from Offenbach, Herren-Sulzbach and Medard. Since 1991, the two ecclesiastical communities of Medard and Niederalben, which lie 15 km away from each other, are both tended by the pastor from Medard. The few Catholic villagers belong to the church community of Rammelsbach and attend Mass at the Catholic church in Ulmet. Formerly, there was a simultaneum at the village's Evangelical church, but the Catholics seldom ever made use of it. The village's Catholics take part in Evangelical community life.

At the old graveyard around the church, the dead of both denominations were buried. In the time of French rule, this graveyard was secularized and ownership was transferred to the municipality. From 1835, there were no further burials at the graveyard around the church. The land was given back to the church in 1836, a deed acknowledged in an 1895 agreement. The municipal graveyard beneath the Mittagsfels was laid out in 1835.

== Politics ==
=== Municipal council ===
The council is made up of 8 council members, who were elected by majority vote at the municipal election held on 7 June 2009, and the honorary mayor as chairman.

=== Mayor ===
Niederalben's mayor is Michael Rihlmann.

=== Coat of arms ===
The municipality's arms might be described thus: Per bend sinister Or a lion rampant sinister gules armed and langued azure and azure issuant from base a mount of three of the first upon which a pasqueflower argent.

The charge on the dexter (armsbearer's right, viewer's left) side, the lion, is a reference to the village's former allegiance to the Counts of Veldenz (according to one source) or the Waldgraves (according to another). The charges on the sinister (armsbearer's left, viewer's right) side are a pasqueflower, which within the municipality is under conservational protection at the Mittagsfels conservation area, and a three-knolled hill (a charge known in German heraldry as a Dreiberg), representing the plant's habitat (it only grows on hilly land). The arms have been borne since 1964.

== Culture and sightseeing ==
=== Buildings ===
The following are listed buildings or sites in Rhineland-Palatinate’s Directory of Cultural Monuments:

- Evangelical church, Im Eck 3 – aisleless church, reduced five-eighths quire, essentially about 1355 (dendrochronologically dated), conversion 1772, ridge turret about 1901; furnishings, Stumm organ about 1800
- Im Eck 1 and 3 (monumental zone) – group of houses from an estate complex (house and standalone barn) from 1893 and Evangelical church, 1355 and 1772
- In der Gass 14, Neuwirtshaus 3 and 5 – two former Quereinhäuser (combination residential and commercial houses divided for these two purposes down the middle, perpendicularly to the street), no. 5 with crow-stepped gable, 1747, back wing not as old; no. 3 plastered building with half-hipped roof, 1789, conversion 1856

=== Natural monuments ===
Niederalben has two nature conservation areas, Mittagsfels and Steinalbmündung, both whose names refer to the local geography. "Mittagsfels" is also a craggy formation, and the name Steinalbmündung means "mouth of the Steinalb", the local brook. Parts of the Steinalbmündung Nature Conservation Area actually also lie within Rathsweiler’s and Ulmet’s limits.

=== Regular events ===
Niederalben holds its kermis (church consecration festival, locally known as the Kerwe) on the first Sunday in May (also called the Maikerb), and it still draws many former villagers who have moved elsewhere. On that Sunday, the Straußbuben ("bouquet lads"), and often also Straußmädchen ("bouquet girls"), put the Kerwestrauß up at the inn. Although it is called a Strauß ("bouquet"), it is actually a spruce tree decorated with colourful streamers. The Straußpfarrer ("bouquet pastor", but not a real clergyman) then reads the rhymed Straußpredigt ("bouquet sermon"), which is a summary of the year's events in the village. Over the last few years, city dwellers have felt a heightened interest in this rural custom, even if the kermis is no longer celebrated like a "Polish or Russian church consecration festival", as J. von Plänckner put it in 1833 in his Beschreibung der königlich preußischen, der königlich bayerischen, der großherzoglich oldenburgischen und der landgräflich Hessen-Homburgischen Rheinlande ("Description of the Royal Prussian, Royal Bavarian, Grand Ducal Oldenburg and Landgravial Hesse-Homburg Rhine Lands").

=== Clubs ===
Even though the school, the parish office and in 1996 the post as well have been withdrawn from Niederalben, and hardly any businesses can keep afloat nowadays, the villagers have still got themselves involved in clubs. Many are members of several clubs. The oldest club was the singing club, which was founded in 1890 as a men's singing club, but which has since become inactive. For a short while, there was a hiking club, the Pfälzerwaldverein, but there is no longer any interest in this. The sport club has united with the one in Ulmet. Football matches were once held alternately on either Ulmet's or Niederalben's sporting ground, but since 2009, only Ulmet's has been used. Still active are a shooting club and an angling club. There are further an Evangelical women's aid association and a countrywomen's club.

== Economy and infrastructure ==
=== Economic structure ===
In the Steinalb valley within Niederalben's limits once stood a few mills, but in 1938 they suddenly found themselves within the Baumholder Troop Drilling Ground, and have since fallen into disrepair. The only nearby mill that is still running stands near Niederalben on the Steinalb, but over on the Steinalb's right bank and thus on the far side of the old Bavarian-Prussian border, within Rathsweiler’s limits. Until the Second World War, the predominant economic structure was agricultural. Indeed, farming was about the only kind of livelihood to be had. Each farmer, though, had only a small plot and the main crops were cereal grains and potatoes. Fruitgrowing, mainly winter apples and a few vineyards added to the agricultural mix. A major woodland in the Steinalb formed the municipal forest. Anyone who wanted a profession other than agriculture had to move to the city. After the First World War, this mainly meant the Ruhr area. This changed in 1938 when the Nazis established the Baumholder Troop Drilling Ground. The jobs that arose there were taken even by farmers. What had been a farming village thus became a village of workers and employees. Until 1950, one cabinetmaker’s shop, three shoemaker’s shops, two tailor’s shops and one wainwright’s shop managed to stay in business. Besides one building material wholesaler, there were still three grocery shops and a butcher’s shop. By 1996, only the building material wholesaler was still in business. There were, however, newer businesses by that time, a plasterwork company and a roofing business. All other inhabitants are dependent on employment. The village has become to a great extent a residential community. Those in the workforce commute to jobs within the district and even as far as the Eastern Palatinate.

=== Education ===
The Niederalben village school was in existence for more than 200 years. Under the comital administration in the late 18th century, the teacher for the winter school (a school geared towards an agricultural community’s practical needs, held in the winter, when farm families had a bit more time to spare) was "rented". In 1780, a schoolteacher named Simon took on the post. It is known that in 1816, the schoolteacher earned 42 Rhenish guilders yearly, which was worth 23 Reichstaler. The schoolteacher otherwise had to live mainly from agriculture.

Even before the First World War, two classes were established, the small one for Jakob Klein and the big one for Peter Beuscher. Klein was a botanist and set himself to the task of establishing the nature conservation area at the Mittagsfels. In 1787, for the upper and lower villages, 41 local people built a municipal centre where schoolchildren could also be taught. In 1838, between the two village centres, near the church, a schoolhouse and a teacher's dwelling were built. In 1963, a new schoolhouse was built, and the old one was torn down. In 1969, the Hauptschule classes were merged into the ones at the Sankt Julian central school, as were also the primary school classes in 1971. Since 1973, primary school pupils have been attending classes at the Ulmet/Erdesbach primary school, while the Hauptschule students have been attending the Regionale Schule (formerly a Hauptschule) in Altenglan.

For a while, the schoolhouse in Niederalben stood empty. In 1972, it was rented by the Kusel district and then occupied by classes of a school for children with learning difficulties. In 1997, this special school also left the schoolhouse in Niederalben. Since then, it has been let to the Wolfstein Christian Youth Village, but it is foreseen that the rental arrangement will soon be dissolved, whereafter the schoolhouse, dedicated in 1963, will again stand empty.

=== Transport ===
Until the time before the Second World War, Niederalben was linked only by a small road through the Glan valley and a highway to Baumholder. In 1938, on military grounds, the road now called Bundesstraße 420 was expanded by the Nazis as a link to the Siegfried Line. It had also been on military grounds that the railway had been built through the Glan valley in 1903–1904. Niederalben-Rathsweiler railway station was built in 1904 at the outlying centre of Neuwirtshaus. Originally nothing more than the Rhinegraves’ old hunting lodge, Neuwirtshaus (whose name means "new inn") became a small transport hub, for the villages up on the heights were also served from here, and once the Nazis had also set up the Baumholder Troop Drilling Ground, there were also troop movements.

By the 1940s and 1950s, through traffic in the village of Niederalben had become unbearable, as troop traffic was all being driven along one narrow street through the village. In 1952, the federal government had the street expanded into a Panzerstraße. In 1974, though, a village bypass was built, while the building of Autobahn A 62 (Kaiserslautern–Trier), running to the southwest, also greatly reduced the troop traffic running through Niederalben. In the Glan valley, Bundesstraße 420 (Oppenheim–Neunkirchen) touches the village. It also affords a link from Niederalben to the district seat of Kusel and to the lower Nahe area (Bad Kreuznach). The railway line was abandoned about 1985.

Serving Altenglan is Altenglan station, which is on the Landstuhl–Kusel railway and is served hourly by Regionalbahn service RB 67 to and from Kaiserslautern, called the Glantalbahn (the name of which refers to the Glan Valley Railway, which shared some of the route of the Landstuhl–Kusel line, including the former railway junction at Altenglan).
