= Ridge turret =

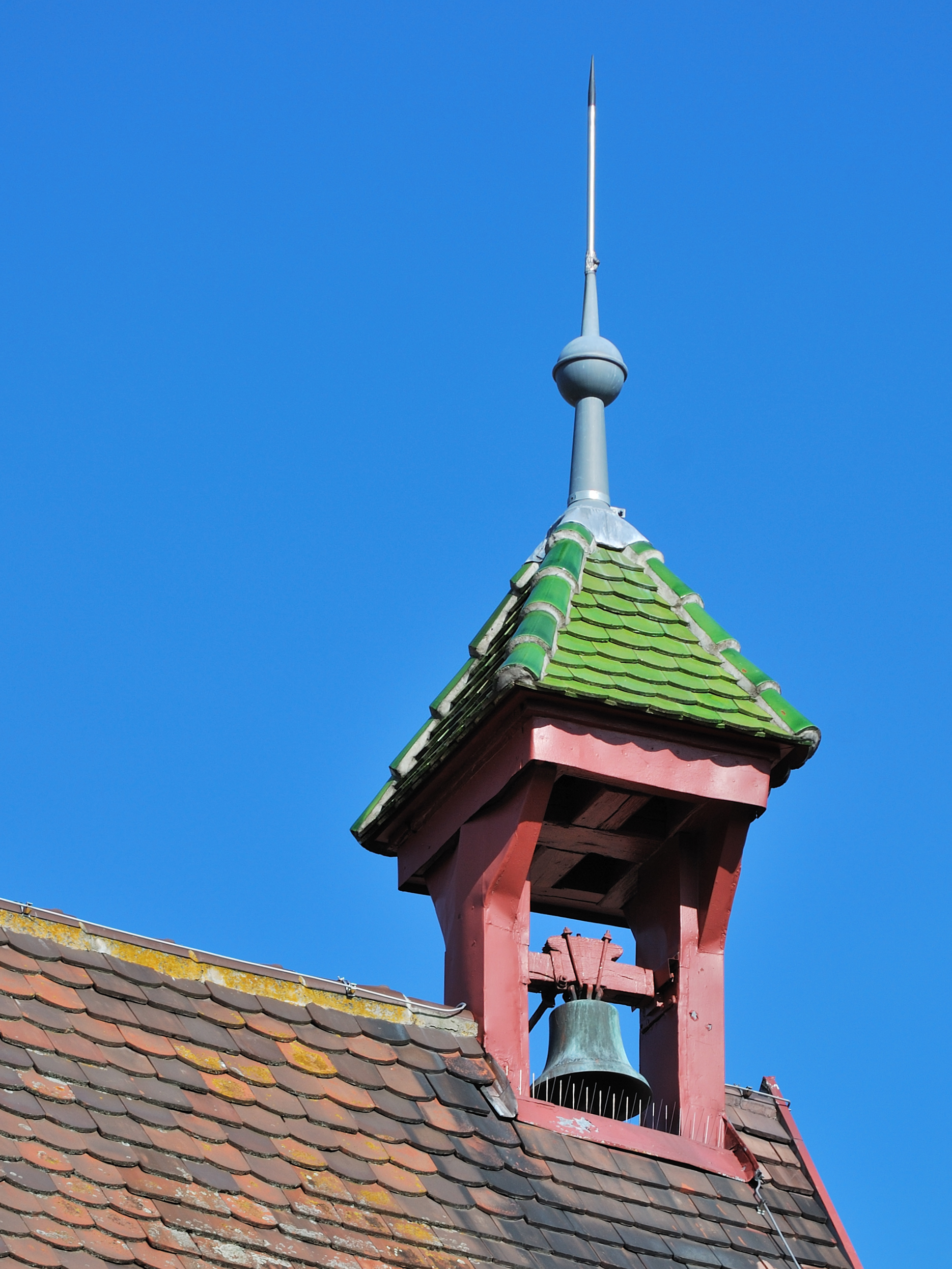
Ridge turret on Korntal-Münchingen town hall, Baden-Württemberg, Germany

A ridge turret is a turret or small tower constructed over the ridge or apex between two or more sloping roofs of a building. It is usually built either as an architectural ornament for purely decorative purposes or else for the practical housing of a clock, a bell or an observation platform. Its function is thus different from that of a roof lantern, despite a frequent similarity of external appearance. It can have a flat roof but usually has a pointed roof or other kind of apex over.

When the height of a roof turret exceeds its width it is usually called a tower or steeple in English architecture, and when the height of a ridge turret's roof exceeds its width, it is called a spire in English architecture or a flèche in French architecture.

== Images ==
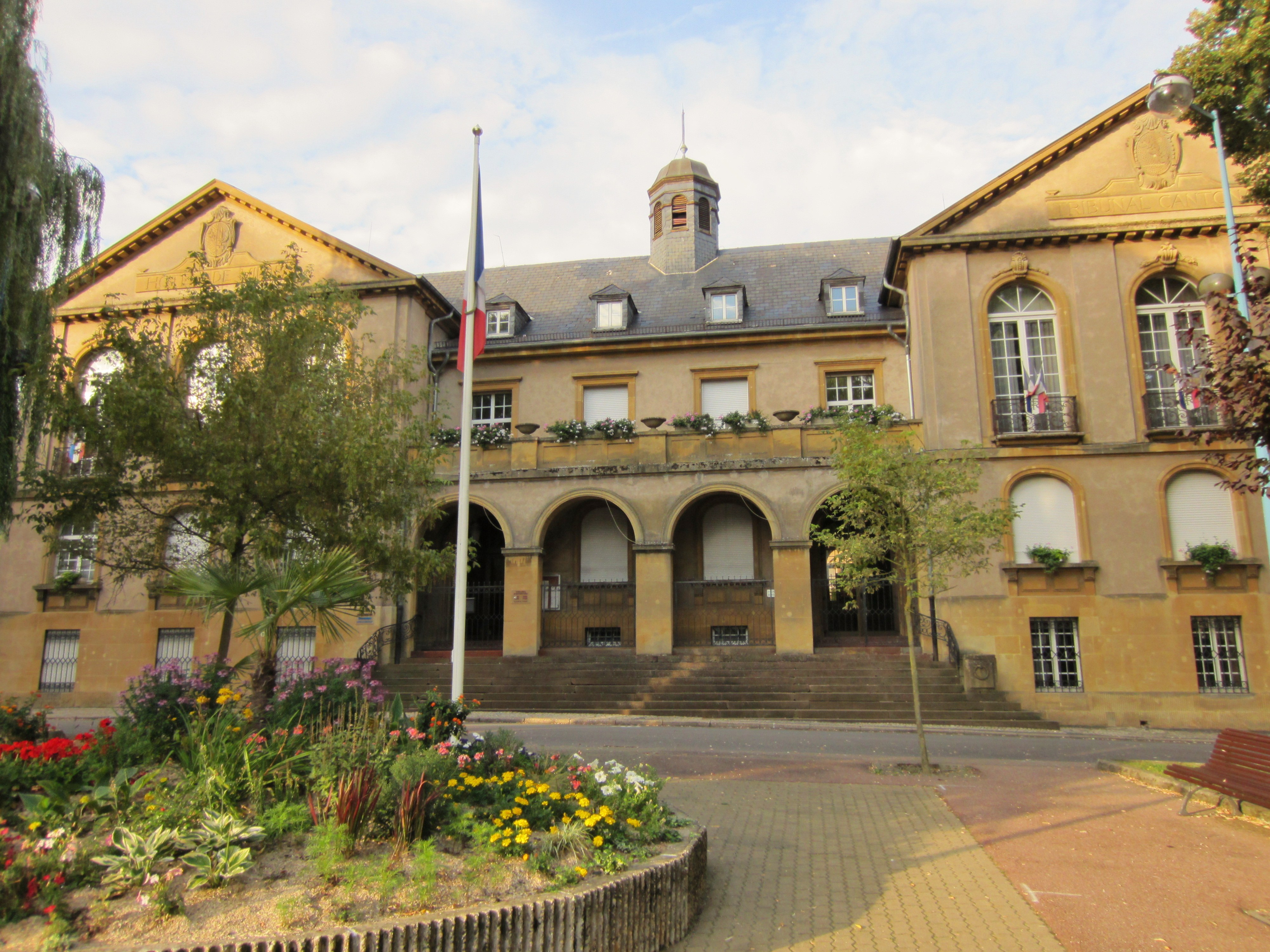
Ridge turret on Ars-sur-Moselle town hall, France

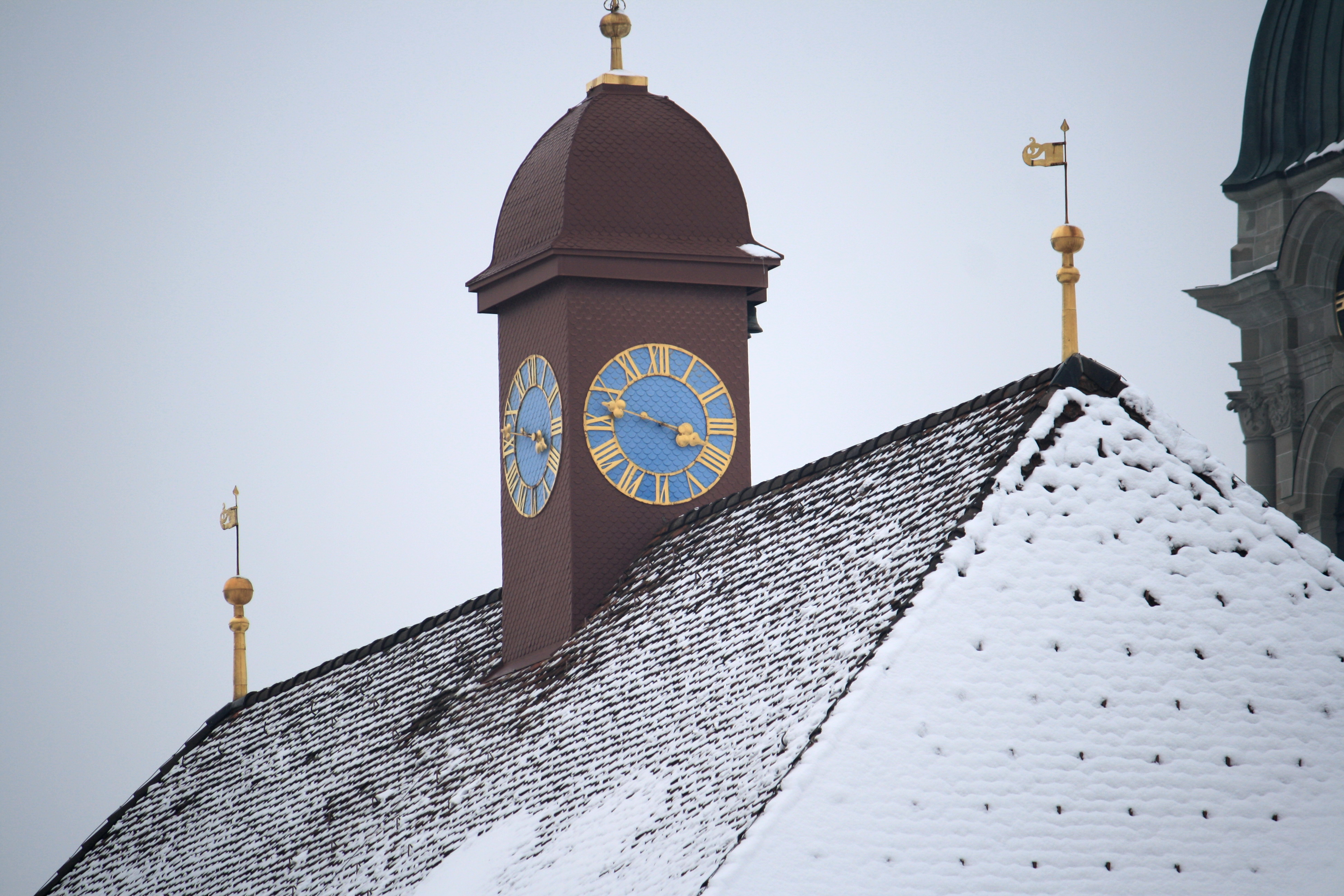
Ridge turret on Benedictine abbey in Einsiedeln, Switzerland

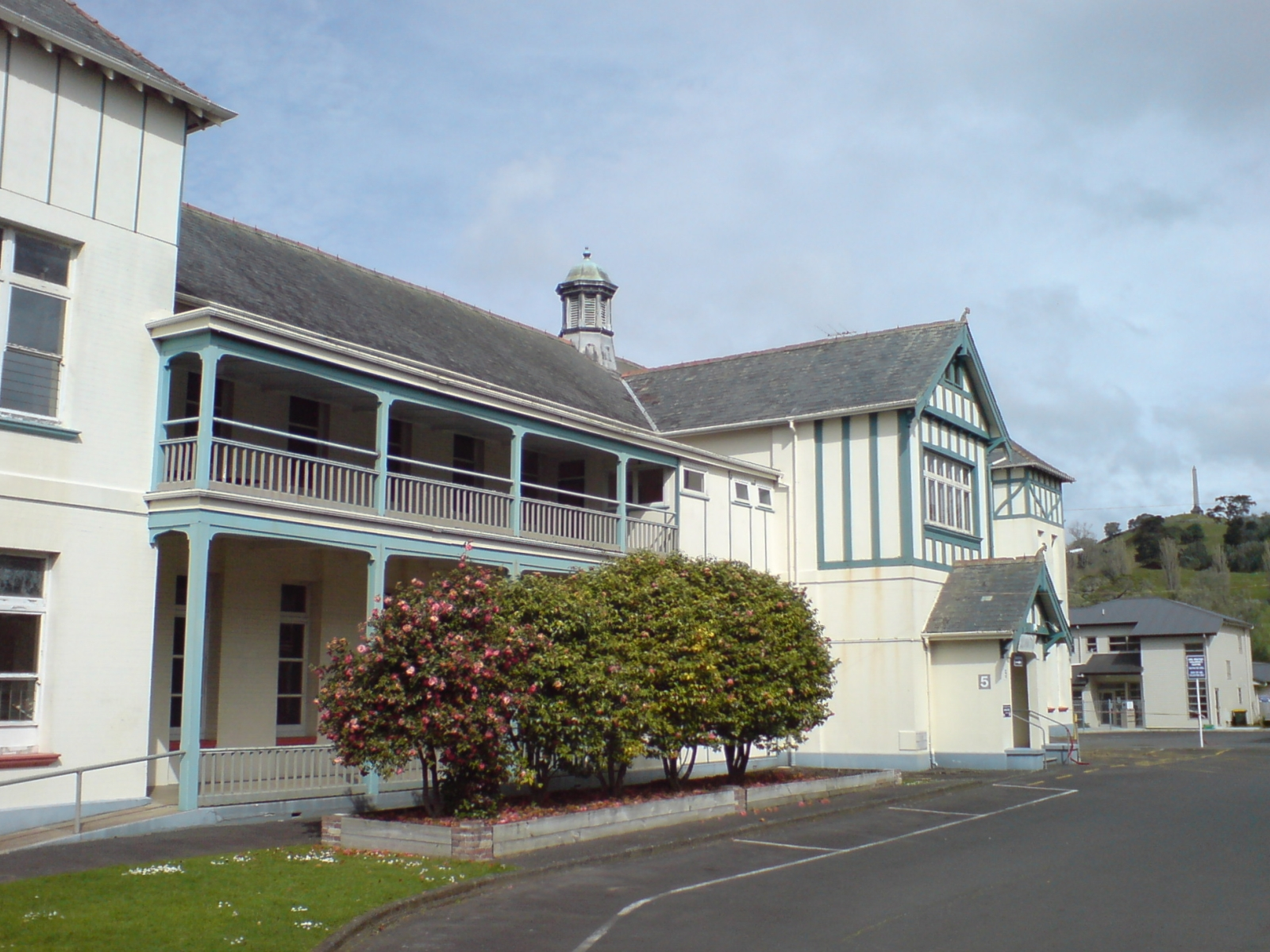
Ridge turret on Greenlane Medical Centre in Greenlane, Auckland, New Zealand.

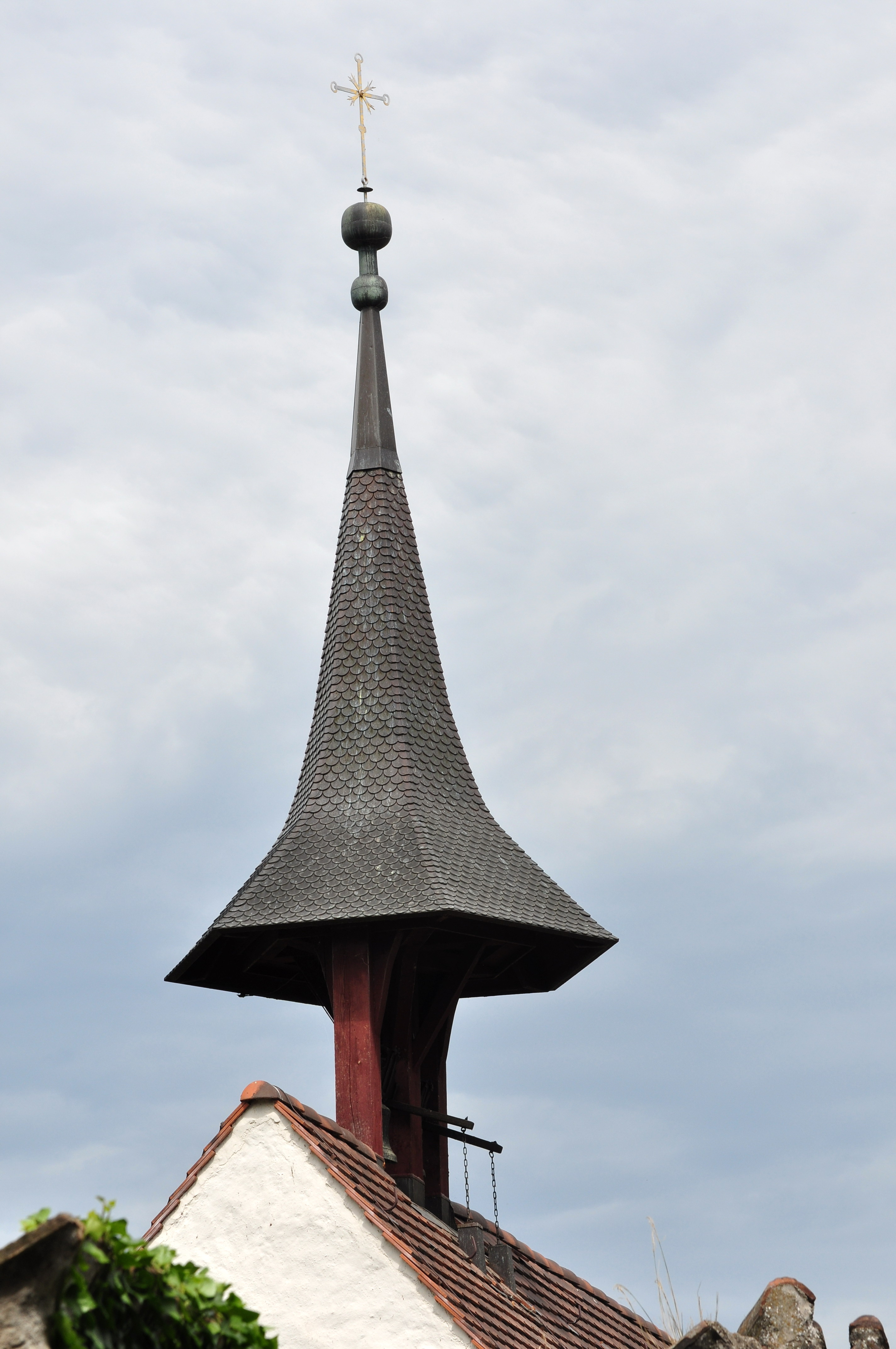
Ridge tower of the Liebfrauenkapelle in Rapperswil, Switzerland

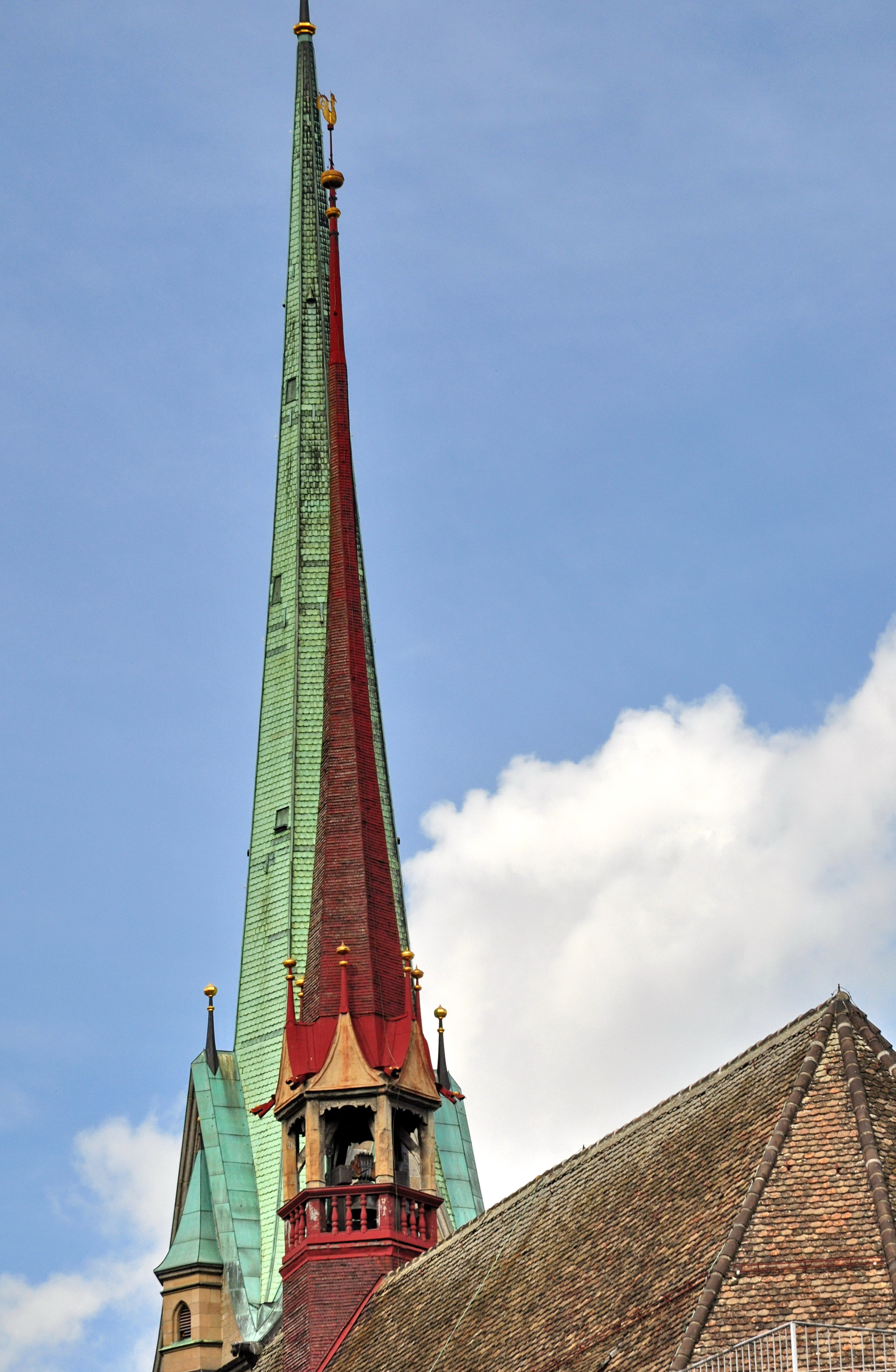
The 27.1 metres (88.9 ft) high ridge turret of Predigerkirche Zürich, its 96 metres (315 ft) clock tower in the background.
