= Etschberg =

- Municipality
- Coat of arms

- Location of Etschberg within Kusel district
- Interactive map of Etschberg
- Location within Germany Location within Rhineland-Palatinate
- Coordinates: 49°30′50″N 7°25′26″E
- Country: Germany
- State: Rhineland-Palatinate
- District: Kusel
- Municipal assoc.: Kusel-Altenglan

Government
  - Mayor (2019–24): Christoph Schneider

Area
  - Total: 3.46 km^{2} (1.34 sq mi)
- Elevation: 370 m (1,210 ft)

Population (2025-12-31)
  - Total: 645
  - Density: 186/km^{2} (483/sq mi)
- Time zone: UTC+01:00 (CET)
  - Summer (DST): UTC+02:00 (CEST)
- Postal codes: 66871
- Dialling codes: 06381
- Vehicle registration: KUS
- Website: www.etschberg.net

Etschberg is an Ortsgemeinde – a municipality belonging to a Verbandsgemeinde, a kind of collective municipality – in the Kusel district in Rhineland-Palatinate, Germany. It belongs to the Verbandsgemeinde of Kusel-Altenglan, whose seat is in Kusel.

== Geography ==
=== Location ===
The municipality lies in the Kusel Musikantenland (“Minstrels’ Land") in the Western Palatinate, in the northerly shelter of a ridge stretching southeastwards from the 402 m-high Odersberg (or Ödesberg). The Rödelsbach (brook) touches the village along the northern edge, then flowing east to the river Glan. Surrounded by gardens and meadows with many fruit trees, Etschberg lies in a relatively small municipal area with an elevation ranging from 220 to 320 m above sea level. The broader area is rich in woodlands. Within the municipal area, the highest elevation is 380 m above sea level. An outstanding view over the village and the mountains of the Westrich, an historic region that encompasses areas in both Germany and France, can be had from the 402-metre-high peak of the Kreuzberg, although that lies outside the municipal limits in the neighbouring municipality of Schellweiler. The municipal area measures 345 ha, of which 107 ha is wooded.

=== Neighbouring municipalities ===
Etschberg borders in the north on the municipality of Haschbach am Remigiusberg, in the east on the municipality of Theisbergstegen, in the south on the municipality of Rehweiler, in the southwest on the municipality of Hüffler and in the west on the municipality of Schellweiler.

=== Municipality’s layout ===
Originally, the houses in Etschberg stretched along a single road from the dale high up the slope. Since this road was from beginning to end rather steep and since in the days of draught animals this resulted in torment for the teams carting goods up the slope, a bypass road was built to the east around the village in the years 1924 to 1928. To this day, it is still called the neue Straße (“new road”). Besides agricultural estates from the 19th century, there are also workers’ houses, among which are so-called Musikantenhäuser (houses built by the travelling musicians, who were once quite numerous hereabouts). Among the newest houses are single-family dwellings. Because of the villagers’ readiness to beautify their village, favoured by the intact infrastructure, the village had some great successes between 1972 and 1981 in the contest Unser Dorf soll schöner werden (“Our village should become lovelier”). Etschberg was four times district winner as well placing high on other occasions, coming in second in regional and state competition. To a great extent through their own work, villagers have built a graveyard hall, a new sporting ground with a clubhouse, a children's playground, a grilling pavilion, a village fountain and a village community centre with a multipurpose hall. The graveyard lies at the northern entrance to the village. The sporting ground with its clubhouse is laid out on the heights above the village next to the Kreisstraße that runs towards Schellweiler.

== History ==
=== Antiquity ===
The Etschberg area was settled in both prehistoric and Gallo-Roman times, bearing witness to which are local archaeological finds. These mainly take the shape of the Iron Age barrows below the Kreuzberg's peak within Schellweiler's municipal limits, another in the cadastral area called Winterhell within Kusel’s limits, the cremation graveyard within Haschbach's limits and finds from Roman times, foremost those unearthed in and around the neighbouring town of Kusel.

=== Middle Ages ===
Etschberg was founded at an unknown time, at least 200 years before its thus far first known documentary mention from 1364. Etschberg lay in the so-called Remigiusland, which was transferred in 1112 to the Counts of Veldenz as a Schutzvogtei (that is, the Counts became its protectors). According to the 1364 document, all villages in the Amt of Altenglan-Brücken, and thus also Etschberg, had to materially support the newlyweds Heinrich III of Veldenz and Lauretta of Sponheim, who had chosen Lichtenberg Castle as their seat. Surviving is a mediaeval Weistum (a Weistum – cognate with English wisdom – was a legal pronouncement issued by men learned in law in the Middle Ages and early modern times) from Etschberg whose text likely dates from the 16th century (1546?). Even before Etschberg was mentioned, the name of the now vanished village of Leidenstall cropped up in a document, according to which the villages of Leidenstall and Eisenbach were to pay a tax of seven solidi in Electoral-Trier currency to the Schultheiß of Kusel. In 1546, the Leidenstaller Hube (a rural area) was still mentioned; it had to pay 28 Mittel of oats to the Gracious Lord. Etschberg remained with the County of Veldenz until 1444 when the last count died without a male heir. His daughter Anna inherited the county, but not the comital title. Her husband Count Palatine Stephan then took it and, combining it with his own holdings, founded the County Palatine of Zweibrücken, which would come to be known as the Duchy of Palatinate-Zweibrücken.

=== Modern times ===
Etschberg shared Palatinate-Zweibrücken's history until that state was swept away in the events of the French Revolution. There is no record of how many villagers survived the grimmest times in the Thirty Years' War; it could not have been many. Nevertheless, the 1646 Kusel church register lists a marriage, and each year, children were regularly being born. On the other hand, since no burials are listed until 1668 (twenty years after the war ended), it can be assumed that the villagers back then were young families who had come to Etschberg to repopulate it. As a result of French King Louis XIV's wars of conquest, Etschberg was listed in 1775 as “burnt”. During the 18th century the village recovered.

==== Recent times ====
Etschberg lay in French times from 1801 to 1814 in the Department of Sarre, the Arrondissement of Birkenfeld, the Canton of Kusel and the Mairie (“Mayoralty”) of Quirnbach. In the time that followed, when the Kingdom of Bavaria held sway, it lay within the Bayerischer Rheinkreis – the part of the Rhineland that the Congress of Vienna had awarded to Bavaria – in the Landkommissariat (district), Canton and Bürgermeisterei (“Mayoralty”) of Kusel. During the 1849 Palatine-Badish Uprising, the cantonal defence board gathered together 19 young men who had been recruited for the first contingent of Revolutionary troops. In the course of the events, which did not go the Revolutionaries’ way, these men were, however, not deployed.

In the early 1930s, the Nazi Party (NSDAP) became somewhat popular in Etschberg. In the 1930 Reichstag elections, 11% of the local votes went to Adolf Hitler’s party while 52.5% went to the Communists. By the time of the 1933 Reichstag elections, after Hitler had already seized power, local support for the Nazis had swollen to 35.9% while the Communists’ share of the vote had risen slightly to 54.7%. The Nazis nevertheless prevailed in the end, and Hitler's success in these elections paved the way for his Enabling Act of 1933 (Ermächtigungsgesetz), thus starting the Third Reich in earnest. Among other things, Hitler banned the Communist Party of Germany.

Administrative structure underwent no appreciable change until administrative restructuring in Rhineland-Palatinate, in the course of which Etschberg became an Ortsgemeinde in the Verbandsgemeinde of Kusel in 1972.

=== Population development ===
Population figures for the Middle Ages are not available. According to the so-called 1609 Konker Protokolle (Konken Protocols), there were 11 families living in Etschberg in that year, with 48 inhabitants, among them 22 married people, one widow, 22 children, a manservant and two maidservants. Among these families, one man exercised the function of censor, and two men were butchers by trade. There was only one farmer, but there were also one blacksmith, two bricklayers, one coppersmith, one gardener, one shoemaker and one knacker. Thus, even before the Thirty Years' War, agriculture was not pronounced in Etschberg, although it was certain that, through the one farmer that they had, all families worked at farming as a secondary occupation. After the Thirty Years' War, there were newcomers to the village, who came to replace those lost in the war. Nevertheless, there were still only 25 people living in the village by 1675 (27 years after the war had ended). It is worth noting, though, that during the 17th century, 25 families emigrated to various countries. During the great population growth in the 18th century, during which hardly any emigration was recorded, Etschberg grew into one of the biggest villages around Kusel. The industrial village of Rammelsbach was the only one that saw greater growth in its population figures. It must be borne in mind that even as early as the 18th century, only a small share of the inhabitants could earn their livelihood at farming. Etschberg was developing into a workers’ village, and beginning in the 19th century, it was becoming a centre of the Wandermusikantentum, the industry of travelling musicians. This influenced the whole municipality, with the musicians’ urbane manner serving as a model to the farming and working-class youth. In the time before the Second World War, the travelling musician industry came to an end. Today, Etschberg is mainly a community for people who must seek their livelihoods outside the village. Population growth is nowadays not as strong as it was in bygone days, but at least the figures are not shrinking, as they are all too swiftly elsewhere in the district.

The following table shows population development over the centuries for Etschberg, with some figures broken down by religious denomination:

Year	1609	1675	1704	1802	1825	1835	1871	1905	1939	1961	1971	1982	2002
Total	48	25	30	228	349	397	509	517	623	693	651	663	716
Catholic					14					27
Evangelical					335					665
Other					–					1

=== Municipality’s name ===
The village's name is made up of the placename ending —berg (“mountain” in German) with the prefix Etsch—, which stems from an old German verb etzen, a word that meant “eat” (essen in Modern High German), “browse” (äsen) or “feed” (atzen; used when speaking of young birds) among other things, and thus it refers to animals feeding, and the name would mean a meadow or grazing land that lies at a mountain. Etschberg's 1364 first documentary mention in a Veldenz document rendered the name Etzberg, a spelling that also cropped up in a series of later documents (1460, 1482, 1593). Other names that the village has borne over the ages are Etzberke (1446), Exeberg (1458), Etzburg (1482), Etßberg (1546), Etzschbergk (1619) and Etschberg (1785).

=== Vanished villages ===
The former village of Leidenstall, whose name still appears in the rural cadastral toponym “Leidstaler Hube”, lay to the municipal area's south, so as to be within Rehweiler’s limits. It was mentioned as early as 1270 as Leudenstall, a name perhaps meaning “Luido’s Farm” (Stall was a word meaning “place”; compare the Modern High German Stelle). The shift from —stall to —tal (as in the cadastral name) came only later. Later names for the place were Laidensthal (1446), Laidsthal (1484) and Leidsthal (1588). The last form comes from Johannes Hofmann's Beschreibung des Oberamtes Lichtenberg (“Description of the Oberamt of Lichtenberg”). In his time, the village had already been given up; it had supposedly been burnt down one Sunday after all the villagers had gone to church in Kusel. Even then, a building was still standing near the village's location within Etschberg's limits, the so-called Huberhaus from which watch was kept over the surrounding forest. Later, a marksmen's clubhouse stood on the spot.

== Religion ==
Etschberg lay in the Remigiusland, and thereby belonged from the time of its founding to the Church of Reims, although in terms of ecclesiastical organization it was subject to the Archbishopric of Mainz. Within the regional ecclesiastical organization the village belonged to the Church of Kusel during the Middle Ages and even into Early Modern Times. In the age of the Reformation, all the inhabitants converted first to Lutheranism and then on Count Palatine Johannes I's orders in 1588, they had to drop Martin Luther’s teachings and adopt Calvinism. Lutherans and Catholics did not re-emerge, albeit sporadically, until the late 17th century. The Catholics nowadays belong to the parish of Remigiusberg (Theisbergstegen) in the Catholic deaconry of Kusel, while the Evangelicals belong to the parish of Theisbergstegen in the Evangelical deaconry of Kusel.

== Politics ==
=== Municipal council ===
The council is made up of 12 council members, who were elected by majority vote at the municipal election held on 7 June 2009, and the honorary mayor as chairman.

=== Mayor ===
Etschberg's mayor is Christoph Schneider.

=== Coat of arms ===
The German blazon reads: In Silber auf gewölbtem, grünen Boden ein kniender, grünbekleideter Jäger mit roter Feder am Hut und goldenem Pfeil mit blauer Spitze in gespanntem, goldenen Bogen.

The municipality's arms might in English heraldic language be described thus: Argent in base a mount vert on which a hunter kneeling proper vested of the second, his hat with a feather gules, with an arrow Or barbed of the first in a bow drawn of the fourth.

The arms go back to a seal from the 18th century and have no apparent connection to the village's history. The arms have been borne since 1982 when they were approved by the now defunct Rheinhessen-Pfalz Regierungsbezirk administration in Neustadt an der Weinstraße.

== Culture and sightseeing ==
=== Regular events ===
Old customs are still kept in Etschberg. Foremost among these is the kermis (church consecration festival), which is held on the third weekend in August.

=== Clubs ===
Cultural life in Etschberg is defined to a great extent by the village's clubs. Events are held at the village community centre (Dorfgemeinschaftshaus). Particularly in the field of music, Etschberg produced artists of nationwide fame. These came to the world through the former travelling musician industry (Wandermusikantentum) or in the form of particular persons such as court musician Ernst Rech or chamber musician Heinz Pfaff, who successfully conducted several orchestras and also undertook concert tours in various European countries, the United States and South Africa.

The following clubs currently exist in Etschberg:

- Sportverein VfL 1932 — sport club
- Schützenverein — shooting club
- Gesangverein — singing club
- Musikverein — music club
- Landfrauenverein — countrywomen's club
- Obst- und Gartenbauverein — fruit growing and gardening club
- Rentnerverein — pensioners’ club
- AWO-Ortsgruppe — workers’ welfare local chapter
- SPD-Ortsverein — Social Democratic Party of Germany local chapter
- Förderverein “St. Florian” der Feuerwehr — fire brigade promotional association
- Förderverein des VfL — sport club promotional association
- Polenhilfe — aid to Poland

== Economy and infrastructure ==
=== Economic structure ===
Even as early as the 16th century, unlike all other villages in the area, only a small part of Etschberg's population earned their livelihood at farming. The foremost occupation here was crafts. As early as the 17th century, Etschberg developed into a workers’ village, even if job opportunities in the village itself were rather scant. On the other hand, there were mines at the Potzberg and also in neighbouring villages. Then in the 19th century, the great stone quarries arose in Rammelsbach and on the Glan which, although they were indeed hard jobs, offered fairly good earning opportunities, for those who could get themselves hired. Not everyone could work in the mines, and this spurred the travelling musician industry (Wandermusikantentum), which arose in the earlier half of the century. Many men – and it was mainly men – earned their living travelling Europe and even the world playing in orchestras. The first Wandermusikant known to have come from Etschberg was Jakob Schönborn. He came to the village from Altenglan and founded a family of musicians. Other such families subsequently arose, such as the Brothers Rech, whose father, a day labourer, had died young. The Etschberg musicians first joined with Wandermusikanten from other villages, until they had gained enough experience to go it alone in the world. About 1920, there were still four orchestras in Etschberg.

No later than the outbreak of the Second World War, though, the tradition of Wandermusikanten had come to an end. Today Etschberg is for many people a residential community, and they must seek their livelihoods elsewhere. In the village itself, though, are one inn, a grocer’s shop, a bakery, a building firm, a bus firm and a recording studio.

=== Education ===
Originally, from the late 17th century onwards, schoolchildren from Etschberg attended school in Kusel, as did those from Godelhausen and Eisenberg. In 1711, the three municipalities reported to the government in Zweibrücken that the way to Kusel was too far, and that the three villages wanted to build a school out of their own resources. The government approved this proposal, and so, that very same year, a new shared school arose in the biggest of the three villages, Etschberg. A schoolteacher named Beinbrech from Kusel was sent to Etschberg in 1712, but he left for Konken in 1716. He was followed by Johann Dielforter. In 1722, the three villages built a new common schoolhouse in Godelhausen, whose location was central. Soon thereafter, Mr. Dielforter became ill and was supported by his son, Johann Nikolaus Dielforter, who was appointed Godelhausen schoolteacher once his father had withdrawn from teaching. Parents were apparently not satisfied with the younger Mr. Dielforter. Among their complaints, he was teaching the children to read wrong, he did not teach well enough to prepare them for the Confirmation examination, he would rather have had the children cut birch rods than have used these to administer correction, he could not even sing, and the children were not capable of performing the dirge. After investigating the allegedly incompetent teacher, the government found the parents’ claims about him to be groundless. It is to be understood, though, that two thirds of the schoolchildren were from Etschberg, also that this, the biggest of the three villages, was seeking to build its own schoolhouse, and moreover, that the one in Godelhausen was falling into disrepair. The government would not support Etschberg's goal, and instead ordered a conversion for the school in Godelhausen. All that Etschberg got was its own winter school (a school geared towards an agricultural community's practical needs, held in the winter, when farm families had a bit more time to spare) teacher, but no actual school. As might be imagined, the complaints did not end. This teacher, who also worked at the tailor’s trade, was reported to the government by the municipality, who claimed that he had hired an apprentice who was a sodomite. The Duke punished the municipality for gossip, but at the same time dismissed the teacher. Beginning in 1784 it was prospective schoolteacher Johann Jakob Theiß, the late (d. 1776) Rehweiler schoolteacher Theiß’s son, who taught winter school in Etschberg. Johann Nikolaus Dielforter in Godelhausen had died in 1780. He was then succeeded by his own son, Isaak Dielforter, who eight years after his father’s death also died, at the age of 44. The Etschberg winter school teacher Johann Jakob Reiß now took over the main teaching job in Godelhausen. In 1792, the municipality of Godelhausen, with government approval, built a new schoolhouse. Since Etschberg, which was still seeking to acquire its own schoolhouse, would not pay its share towards building Godelhausen’s new schoolhouse, a plot of Etschberg’s municipal land was forcibly seized and auctioned off. It was about then that French Revolutionary troops overran the land. In 1792, 26 children were being sent to school. In 1818 (after French times), the municipality finally built a new schoolhouse, which soon proved to be inadequate, but a new one was not built until 1937-1938. This one had four classrooms, one of which was used until 1940 as a kindergarten. Owing to a lack of room, Hauptschule students were taught in Altenglan beginning in 1960. In 1970, the primary school was temporarily merged with the one in Haschbach am Remigiusberg. At first, the two level-1 classes were taught in Haschbach, while levels 2 to 4 were all taught in Etschberg, but in 1971, the two level-2 classes were moved to Haschbach. Both municipalities’ schools were then closed in 1972. Primary school pupils were then bussed to Kusel where they attended the requisite classes at either the Hollerschule or the Luitpoldschule. Two years later, the schooling facilities in Kusel had become so overfull that the Etschberg and Haschbach schools were temporarily opened up again. At first, the level-4 class was taught in Haschbach, with the level-3 class joining it a few years later. In Etschberg, the level-6 class was at first taught, later to be joined by level 7. Beginning in 1981, though, all classes still being taught in Etschberg were transferred to Kusel. Today, primary school pupils go to the primary school in that town, while Hauptschule students attend classes at the school centre at the Rossberg. The district seat is also the location of the nearest Gymnasium and Realschule as well as special schools for children with learning difficulties and children with mental handicaps.

=== Transport ===
Etschberg lies off the main through roads, but still favourably with regard to major traffic arteries. Bundesstraßen 420 and 423 are both nearby. To the southwest runs the Autobahn A 62 (Kaiserslautern–Trier); the nearest interchange lies about 5 km away.

Serving nearby Theisbergstegen is a railway station on the Landstuhl–Kusel railway. There are hourly trains at this station throughout the day, namely Regionalbahn service RB 67 between Kaiserslautern and Kusel, named Glantalbahn after a former railway line that shared a stretch of its tracks with the Landstuhl–Kusel railway.

== Famous people ==
=== Sons and daughters of the town ===
- Ernst Diehl (1949–), footballer

=== Famous people associated with the municipality ===
- Margit Conrad (1952–), politician (SPD), grew up in Etschberg

Margit Conrad's father was longtime mayor Karl Conrad. She studied medicine and sociology. Nevertheless, she chose a career as a politician rather than as a doctor. She became a Member of the Bundestag and in 1991, deputy mayor of Saarbrücken (Bürgermeisterin; the mayor bears the title Oberbürgermeister(in) in Saarbrücken). She also became departmental head for environment, health and law in the Saarland Landtag, and in 2001, minister for the environment in Rhineland-Palatinate.
