= Schellweiler =

- Municipality
- Coat of arms

- Location of Schellweiler within Kusel district
- Interactive map of Schellweiler
- Location within Germany Location within Rhineland-Palatinate
- Coordinates: 49°30′52.15″N 7°23′29.21″E
- Country: Germany
- State: Rhineland-Palatinate
- District: Kusel
- Municipal assoc.: Kusel-Altenglan

Government
  - Mayor (2019–24): Matthias Doll

Area
  - Total: 4.31 km^{2} (1.66 sq mi)
- Elevation: 290 m (950 ft)

Population (2025-12-31)
  - Total: 485
  - Density: 113/km^{2} (291/sq mi)
- Time zone: UTC+01:00 (CET)
  - Summer (DST): UTC+02:00 (CEST)
- Postal codes: 66869
- Dialling codes: 06381
- Vehicle registration: KUS
- Website: www.schellweiler.de

Schellweiler is an Ortsgemeinde – a municipality belonging to a Verbandsgemeinde, a kind of collective municipality – in the Kusel district in Rhineland-Palatinate, Germany. It belongs to the Verbandsgemeinde of Kusel-Altenglan, whose seat is in Kusel.

== Geography ==
=== Location ===
The municipality lies in the Bledesbach valley, which stretches from Schellweiler to Wahnwegen along the highway between Kusel and Glan-Münchweiler. The valley is also known locally as the Saubeeretal. Forty-seven hectares of the municipal area's 431 ha is wooded. Schellweiler is a clump village. The bottom of the valley lies roughly 280 m above sea level, and the land rises upwards on three sides. Only to the north does it remain even. The most heavily built-up area is on the eastern slope on the brook's right bank, more than 300 m above sea level, at about the same elevation as the Autobahn A 62 (Kaiserslautern–Trier), which passes by. The built-up area reaches an elevation of about 320 m above sea level. The highest elevation within municipal limits is the top of the Kreuzberg at 402 m above sea level. The village's structure could already be seen in a village plan from 1807, which showed two threads of building development coming from the south on the slopes on both the river's left and right banks. Until 1980, this did not change. Up to 1939, building expansion could also be observed within the village. The most marked expansion came about after 1945, farther towards the slopes, but also northwards in the dale. The Petersgraben new building zone has been fully developed since 1996. All together, 60 new buildings, among them three built as multi-family dwellings, arose after the Second World War to make a total of roughly 160. Since 1985, Schellweiler has been recognized as a village renewal community. The former farming and working-class community has now become almost exclusively a residential community for commuters.

=== Neighbouring municipalities ===
Schellweiler borders in the north on the town of Kusel, in the northeast on the municipality of Haschbach am Remigiusberg, in the east on the municipality of Etschberg, in the south on the municipality of Hüffler, in the west on the municipality of Konken and in the northwest on the municipality of Ehweiler.

=== Constituent communities ===
Also belonging to Schellweiler is the outlying homestead of the Dellwieserhof.

=== Municipality’s layout ===
The construction of the Trier-Landstuhl Autobahn (A 62) in 1970 brought with it a great drawback. It cut through the western half of Schellweiler's municipal area north to south for 1.8 km, thus bringing many villagers, and the dwellers of the Dellwieserhof, too, a great deal of noise pollution. There was yet another drawback: the Autobahn meant that the municipality could never spread out westwards. From 1980 to 1986, “classic” Flurbereinigung was undertaken, bringing along with it an ample network of country lanes. It was pleasing that the rural cadastral toponyms – field names – many of which were centuries old, were preserved after the Flurbereinigung. Some of these refer to former owners (Hinter Peter Braunen Haus, Davidswiesen), to the crops planted there (Bremmenfeld, Bangert – originally Baumgarten, meaning “forest nursery”), the lie of the land (Dellwies, which means “dent meadow”) or the soil's makeup (Steinling, Klopp, both referring to stony ground). The Flurbereinigung also brought along with it the advantages of a fairground with a football pitch, a grilling pavilion and a landscaped pond in the middle of the village as recreational lands. This low-lying land in the dale had been a boggy patch of ground before, between the upper and lower village. Also worthy of mention is that the municipal area in the north and east, along the heights, is crossed by the so-called Roman road leading from Kusel to Herschweiler-Pettersheim.

== History ==
=== Antiquity ===
An old road that runs by some 1.5 km east of the village is believed to have been a Roman road. Near this road in 1957, a Celtic grave was unearthed. Archaeological analysis revealed it to be a woman's grave from the time about 500 BC. The strip-field near the grave bears the name Heidenhübel (Heiden shares an etymology and a meaning with “heathen”).

=== Middle Ages ===
In 1277, Schellweiler had its first documentary mention as Schulrebure. Schellweiler lay in the Remigiusland, which belonged from the Early Middle Ages to the Reformation first to the Bishopric of Reims and then later to the Abbey of Saint-Remi at Reims. From 1127 to 1444, the Counts of Veldenz held the Vogtei over this area. In 1444, the County of Veldenz met its end when Count Friedrich III of Veldenz died without a male heir. His daughter Anna wed King Ruprecht's son Count Palatine Stephan. By uniting his own Palatine holdings with the now otherwise heirless County of Veldenz – his wife had inherited the county, but not her father's title – and by redeeming the hitherto pledged County of Zweibrücken, Stephan founded a new County Palatine, as whose comital residence he chose the town of Zweibrücken: the County Palatine – later Duchy – of Palatinate-Zweibrücken, within whose sovereign area Schellweiler now found itself.

=== Modern times ===
In 1552, the County Palatine acquired the Remigiusland through purchase, and thus Schellweiler remained until 1797 a village in what was now the Duchy of Palatinate-Zweibrücken, belonging to the Oberamt of Lichtenberg and the Schultheißerei of Pfeffelbach. In the Thirty Years' War, Schellweiler was laid waste. In 1675 – the war had ended in 1648 – there were only three families with 25 persons, as against 18 families with 86 persons in 1609, well before the war broke out. The populace also had to suffer in the Franco-Dutch War under French occupation in 1675 and 1676. The same happened in the French Revolution and the ensuing Napoleonic times. In this later period of French rule between 1801 and 1814, Schellweiler belonged to the Canton of Kusel in the Arrondissement of Birkenfeld and the Department of Sarre.

==== Recent times ====
In 1816 under the Congress of Vienna, the Rhine’s left bank, and thereby Schellweiler too, were ceded to the Kingdom of Bavaria. Bavaria’s new exclave was thereupon subdivided into Landkommissariate (now Landkreise, or districts). The Landkommissariate were further subdivided into cantons (Kantonen), and these were yet further subdivided into Bürgermeistereien (“mayoralties”). Beginning at this time, Schellweiler belonged to the Bürgermeisterei of Kusel, and has even remained in the now Verbandsgemeinde of Kusel, which was formed in 1972. Worthy of note among stories from the Second World War is the migration of four local families to Lorraine as part of a Nazi attempt to Germanize the region conquered by Adolf Hitler’s Third Reich. In 1953, the belltower was installed on the schoolhouse roof. The populace was rather disturbed in 1953 and 1954 by the Americans’ shooting exercises right near the village, which resulted in damage to some houses. In 1955, a public bath was opened. From 1980 to 1986, Schellweiler undertook Flurbereinigung. In 1989, the schoolhouse was converted into a village community centre. Misfortune befell Schellweiler in November 1994 when nine young people, among them three men born in Schellweiler, were killed when their van was crushed by an articulated transport truck at a construction site on the Autobahn while they were on their way to work. In 1995, Schellweiler placed second at the district level in the contest Unser Dorf soll schöner werden (“Our village should become lovelier”).

=== Population development ===
The oldest record dealing with Schellweiler's inhabitants themselves dates from 1480. Lordly taxation rolls that year listed 12 families in May and 13 at harvest time. This works out to roughly 50 to 55 inhabitants. The first detailed list of inhabitants, in the 1609 ecclesiastical Visitation protocol of the Oberamt of Lichtenberg, names 86 inhabitants in 18 families. On 31 December 1969, the 584 inhabitants’ age groups broke down thus:

- 0—20: 33.60%
- 20—60: 57.35%
- 60—∞: 20.02%

There were population losses as a result of the Thirty Years' War (1618-1648), emigration to the United States between 1830 and 1900 (80 persons are known to have done this), both world wars (17 fallen in the First World War; 35 fallen and 20 missing in the Second World War) and falling birthrates and migration in the 1970s. Since the 1980s, however, there has been stronger population growth spurred by the village's proximity to the district seat of Kusel.

The following table shows population figures for Schellweiler over the ages:

| Year | 1675 | 1802 | 1857 | 1895 | 1910 | 1939 | 1950 | 1970 | 1980 | 1996 | 2005 |
| Inhabitants | 25 | 209 | 356 | 435 | 457 | 513 | 541 | 567 | 498 | 550 | 584 |

=== Municipality’s name ===
Local historian Ernst Christmann's interpretation of the village's name, Schellweiler, was that it has nothing to do with either a bell (Schelle) or a hamlet (Weiler). The village's first documentary mention came in 1277 in a document from Remigiusberg Abbey, in which a Conradus dictus Busche de Schulrebure is named, that last word being the village's name then. Other names that Schellweiler has borne over the ages are Sullbure (1289), Scholwijlre (1290), Schilwiler (1446), Scelwillr (1458), Schelwilre (1460), Schelweiler (1587) and Schöllweiler (1677). As for the name's meaning, Christmann suggested the following: The ending —bure in the 1277 name is an old word for "building" or "house". The first part of the name is from Middle High German sölve, solve, sulve, and has something to do with the Modern High German word Söller. Although this word's modern meaning is "balcony", it is meant to be understood as "loft". Thus, the name as a whole is to be taken to mean "house with a loft". Originally, the provost's tithe barn may have stood here. As the years went by and the name was no longer understood, the beginning of the name shifted to Schill— or Schell—. Moreover, in imitation of many nearby placenames, the ending shifted to —weiler.

== Religion ==
According to the records in the Kusel Reformed Church's books, Schellweiler belonged to the Kusel church as early as 1567. From 1635 to 1640, records are missing owing to the devastation that the Thirty Years' War wrought upon Kusel and the surrounding municipalities. Beginning with the Reformation, the people were exclusively Protestant, and only about the turn of the 18th century were there once again Catholics living in Schellweiler. Living in the village in 1837 were 341 Protestants and 15 Catholics. In 1904, though, out of 126 inhabitants, only one was Catholic. This situation changed, however, especially after 1945, with immigration and intermarriage. Living in the village in 1996 were 454 Protestants and 62 Catholics. Originally, both denominations buried their dead in Kusel. Only in 1870 did Schellweiler open its own graveyard. By decree from the ecclesiastical polity in Speyer on 1 April 1956, the Evangelical congregation was split away from Kusel and assigned to the parish of Hüffler-Wahnwegen. There was some disquiet in Schellweiler over this new arrangement. Today there are fortnightly church services at the village community centre. Catholics attend church services in Hüffler and along with parishioners there belong to the parish of Kusel.

== Politics ==
=== Municipal council ===
The council is made up of 12 council members, who were elected by majority vote at the municipal election held on 7 June 2009, and the honorary mayor as chairman.

For the 1997 budgetary year, the administrative budget was 544,950 DM, and expenditures and revenues amounted to 148,190 DM.

=== Mayor ===
Schellweiler's mayor is Matthias Doll.

=== Coat of arms ===
The German blazon reads: In Blau eine silberne Schelle mit goldenem Knopf und goldenem Klöppel.

Alternatively, the word Knopf can read Griff, depending on the source, but both refer to the bell's handle.

The municipality's arms might in English heraldic language be described thus: Azure a handbell argent, handle and clapper Or.

Some sources, including regionalgeschichte.net and Heraldry of the World show a different coat of arms (the latter shows both side by side). This one is gules a bell Or. That is to say that the field tincture is red rather than blue, and the bell charge itself is gold rather than silver. The clapper is not of a different tincture, and there is a cannon (that is, fastening ring) at the top of the bell instead of a handle.

The arms were inspired by an old municipal seal that appears next to Etschberg’s seal in a document dated 22 March 1729. The arms have been borne since 3 October 1983, when they were approved by the now defunct Rheinhessen-Pfalz Regierungsbezirk administration in Neustadt an der Weinstraße.

== Culture and sightseeing ==
=== Regular events ===
Until a few years ago, Schellweiler still had the peculiar Western Palatine custom known as the Pfingstquack, observed at Whitsun (Pfingsten in German; see the Henschtal article under Regular events for more about this). A Saint Martin’s Day parade is still held on 11 November. Among folk festivals, Schellweiler still has its kermis (church consecration festival). This was formerly held on the second Sunday after Michaelmas (29 September). When a hall was no longer available for it at that time of year, it was moved to the fourth Sunday in July, and has been celebrated since then as a Zeltkerwe (“tent kermis”). A village festival is held each year on a date earlier than the kermis. Every other year, all are invited to a seniors’ celebration.

=== Culture ===
From 1964 to 1973, Schellweiler had a municipal library, but owing to lack of interest, it closed. Participation in cultural activity is made easy in Schellweiler by the facilities for such activity in nearby district seat of Kusel. The Fritz-Wunderlich-Halle in Kusel, a multipurpose hall, is only 3 km away from Schellweiler.

=== Clubs ===
Schellweiler's oldest club and cultural sponsor is the Cultural Association (Kulturgemeinschaft), a singing club founded in 1908. Worth noting is the partnership with the singing club in Mellenbach in Thuringia. This has existed since 1990, and each year there are reciprocal visits. Another important cultural sponsor is the Schellweiler Music Club, which was founded in 1969 and currently has more than 30 active members. The countrywomen's club offers interesting presentations, demonstrations, sightseeing and outings throughout the year. All three clubs contribute what they can to the staging of village or church events. Important for the village's youth is the sport club, founded after the Second World War. Other clubs are the volunteer fire brigade, the fire brigade promotional association, a “village pond” interest group, an FCK fan club and a Social Democratic Party of Germany local chapter (since 1977).

== Economy and infrastructure ==
=== Economic structure ===
In bygone days, a mill that was built in 1709 stood in the Hiflergrund (rural cadastral area). From 1845 to 1852, 1 838 t of coal was mined at the Hohlbach colliery between Hüffler and Schellweiler. An attempt at coal mining in 1950 was soon given up. A further colliery on the Wenzelberg did not have a very great yield (in 1838 some 35 t). The greater part of the population, well into the 19th century, earned their living at agriculture. Alongside farming there were also a few handicrafts. Since 1945 particularly, there has been a thorough shift in economic focus. Today, people find employment in service-sector businesses, administration and industry in Kusel, Kaiserslautern and the Saarland. Schellweiler's lone remaining farm run as a primary income earner grows potatoes, grain and beetroots for sale or livestock fodder. Businesses in the village include a cabinetry shop, two inns, an artistic blacksmith's shop, an autobody shop, a bicycle shop, a grocery shop with a branch bakery and a branch butcher’s shop.

The following table shows the shift in occupational structure in Schellweiler in the latter half of the 20th century:

| Year | 1950 | 1964 | 1996 |
|---|---|---|---|
| Farms (main income earner) | 23 | 8 | 1 |
| Farms (secondary income earner) | 35 | 15 | 3 |
| Miners | 60 | ~30 | 0 |
| Bricklayers | 45 | ~20 | 10 |
| Ironworkers | 10 | 0 | 0 |
| Quarrymen and stonemasons | 10 | 0 | 0 |
| Construction companies | 1 | 1 | 0 |
| Plastering shops | 0 | 1 | 0 |
| Raiffeisen storehouses | 0 | 1 | 0 |

=== Education ===
According to the first documentary mention of schooling in Schellweiler, in 1713, schoolchildren from Wahnwegen, Schellweiler and Hüffler were taught in Wahnwegen. In 1726, the government of Palatinate-Zweibrücken granted Hüffler leave to be the location of the school that was to be built for all three villages. In 1755, there were 30 schoolchildren from Schellweiler attending this school. In 1782, approval was granted for Schellweiler to set up a winter school (a school geared towards an agricultural community's practical needs, held in the winter, when farm families had a bit more time to spare). In 1792 it was teaching 28 pupils. Only in 1834 did Schellweiler get its own schoolhouse, thereby ushering in regular schooling. When this schoolhouse, in which the schoolteacher also had to live, became too small, the Royal Bavarian Government approved the construction of a new one-floor building in 1884. This was given an upper floor in 1929, and served as a schoolhouse until 1987. With interruptions in wartime (namely the Second World War) and the immediate post-war years, the school was run with two classes, with level-1 to level-4 pupils in one and level-5 to level-7 (or level-8) pupils in the other. On 1 December 1966, a Mittelpunktschule (“midpoint school”, a central school, designed to eliminate smaller outlying schools) opened in Kusel, and Schellweiler schoolchildren in levels 7 and 8 began attending that. Nevertheless, there were then still two classes at the Schellweiler school, reorganized as level-1 to level-3 pupils in one and level-4 to level-6 pupils in the other. On 1 August 1970, a Hauptschule opened for the whole Verbandsgemeinde, and then only primary school pupils remained at the Schellweiler school. To avoid a drop in schooling quality, it was not long before the primary schools from both Schellweiler and Hüffler were put together. This new combined school's location was nominally Hüffler, though one class was still housed at Schellweiler. The permanent solution then came with the formation of the Bledesbachtal primary school in Hüffler, with Wahnwegen's involvement in 1972. One of this school's classes was “farmed out” to Schellweiler until 1987, whereafter the building was free for other uses. In 1989, it was converted into a village community centre and dedicated in December of that year. There is thus no longer any kind of educational institution in Schellweiler.

=== Transport ===
To the south runs the Autobahn A 62 (Kaiserslautern–Trier) and the interchange at Kusel lies only some 3 km away. For years now, the villagers have been trying to institute some kind of noise control measure to deal with the noise pollution generated by the Autobahn. Kusel, Glan-Münchweiler and Homburg can all be easily reached from Schellweiler by bus, with routes running over Kreisstraßen and Landesstraßen. Serving Kusel is a railway station on the Glantalbahn.
