= Ernst Diehl =

German footballer and coach

Personal information
- Date of birth: 28 March 1949 (age 77)
- Place of birth: Etschberg, Germany
- Position: Defender

Senior career*
Years	Team	Apps	(Gls)
1967–1978	1. FC Kaiserslautern	314	(18)

Managerial career
- 1983: 1. FC Kaiserslautern
- * Club domestic league appearances and goals

Ernst Diehl (born 28 March 1949 in Etschberg) is a retired German football player and coach. As a player, he spent 11 seasons in the Bundesliga with 1. FC Kaiserslautern.

== Honors ==
- DFB-Pokal finalist: 1971–72, 1975–76
