= Martin Haller (politician) =

German politician (born 1983)

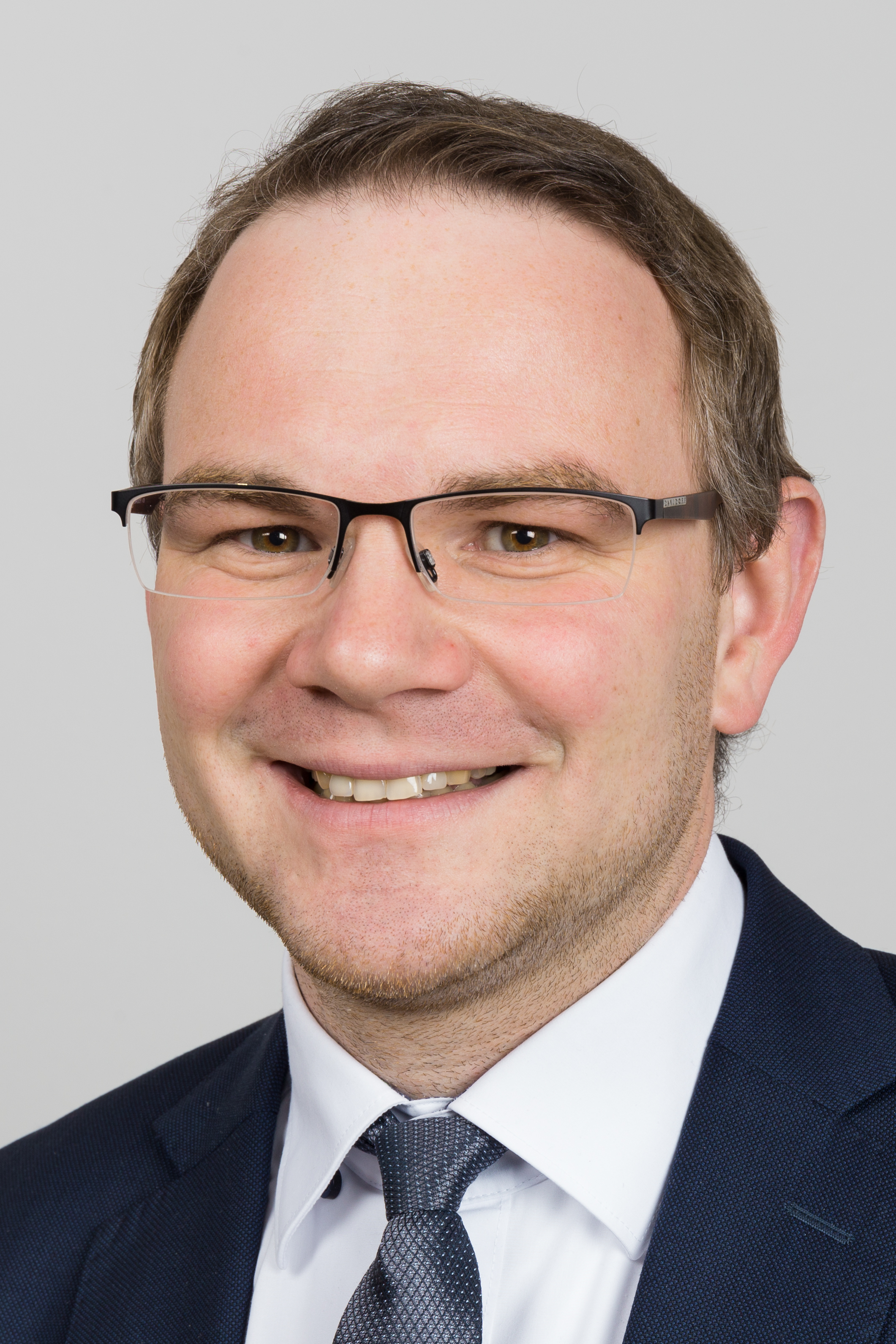
- Haller in 2016

Member of the Landtag of Rhineland-Palatinate
- Incumbent
- Assumed office 18 May 2006

Personal details
- Born: 2 September 1983 (age 42) Kusel
- Party: Social Democratic Party (since 1999)

Martin Haller (born 2 September 1983 in Kusel) is a German politician serving as a member of the Landtag of Rhineland-Palatinate since 2006. He has served as chief whip of the Social Democratic Party since 2016.
