= Kusel =

- Town
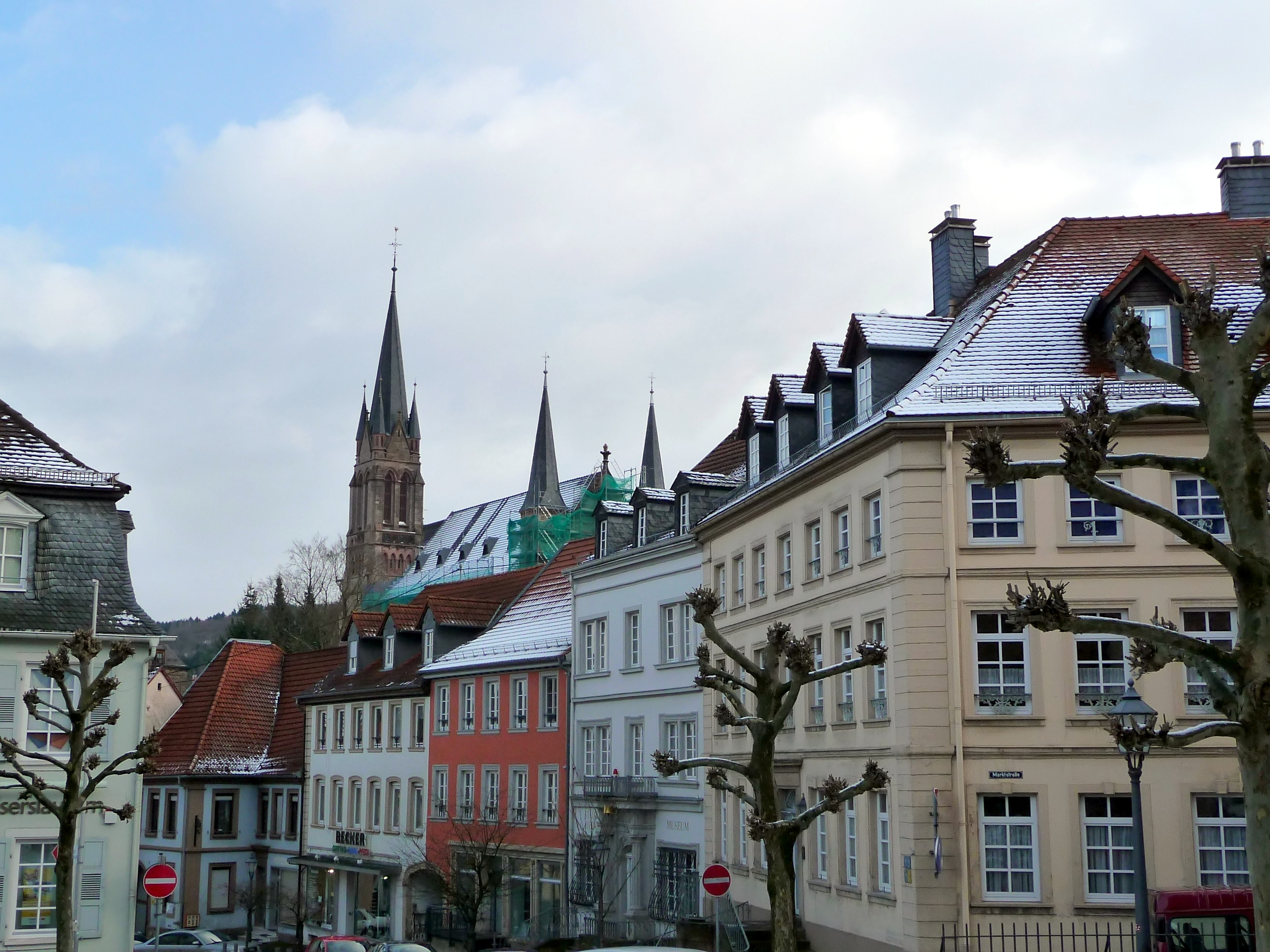
- View into the Old Town with the Town and Local History Museum

- Coat of arms

- Location of Kusel within Kusel district
- Interactive map of Kusel
- Location within Germany Location within Rhineland-Palatinate
- Coordinates: 49°32′5″N 7°23′53″E
- Country: Germany
- State: Rhineland-Palatinate
- District: Kusel
- Municipal assoc.: Kusel-Altenglan
- Subdivisions: 3 Stadtteile

Government
  - Mayor (2019–24): Jochen Hartloff (SPD)

Area
  - Total: 14.37 km^{2} (5.55 sq mi)
- Elevation: 239 m (784 ft)

Population (2025-12-31)
  - Total: 5,108
  - Density: 355.5/km^{2} (920.6/sq mi)
- Time zone: UTC+01:00 (CET)
  - Summer (DST): UTC+02:00 (CEST)
- Postal codes: 66869
- Dialling codes: 06381
- Vehicle registration: KUS
- Website: stadt.kusel.de

Kusel (German pronunciation: [ˈkuːzl̩]; written Cusel until 1865) is a town in the Kusel district in Rhineland-Palatinate, Germany. It is the seat of the Kusel-Altenglan Verbandsgemeinde ("collective municipality") and also the district seat.

The operatic tenor Fritz Wunderlich was born in Kusel.

== Geography ==
=== Location ===
Kusel lies on the Kuselbach in Rhineland-Palatinate's southwest, in the North Palatine Uplands roughly 30 km northwest of Kaiserslautern. The Kuselbach rises in the outlying centre of Diedelkopf where the Bledesbach and the Pfeffelbach (or Aalbach) meet. The dale is hemmed in by a row of mountains, on the left bank the Ödesberg (375 m), and on the right the Gaisberg (355 m), the Roßberg (314 m) and the Herrchenberg (385 m). The floor of the dale lies roughly 220 m above sea level. Prominent landmarks just beyond the town's limits are Lichtenberg Castle to the west and the Remigiusberg (368 m) and the Potzberg (562 m) to the east. With roughly 5,000 inhabitants, Kusel challenges Cochem for the title of Germany's smallest district seat.

=== Neighbouring municipalities ===
Kusel borders in the north on the municipalities of Körborn and Blaubach, in the northeast on the municipality of Altenglan, in the east on the municipality of Rammelsbach, in the southeast on the municipality of Haschbach am Remigiusberg, in the south on the municipality of Schellweiler, in the southwest on the municipality of Ehweiler, in the west on the municipality of Pfeffelbach and in the northwest on the municipality of Ruthweiler.

=== Constituent communities ===
The town of Kusel is divided foremost into the Kernstadt (Inner Town) and the historic Altstadt (Old Town), with the former ringing the latter, and also into the Stadtteil of Diedelkopf, which has melded onto the Inner Town, the residential area “Am Holler” and a further Stadtteil, Bledesbach.

=== Town’s layout ===
The town was from the Middle Ages until the 19th century ringed with a town wall that had three town gates and five towers. In the town core, the mediaeval street layout has been preserved to this day, although the old buildings were burnt out almost utterly in a great fire in 1794. The town centre is characterized by buildings from the 19th century bearing the marks of Classicism and Historicism. Spreading out over the town's west end in the dale, from the mid-19th century until the end of the Second World War, was a major industrial area whose main focus was clothmaking. Some of the old industrial buildings have remained, but are no longer used by industry. A new major industrial area arose after the war in the town's east end. New residential areas were built as early as the 19th century in the neighbourhoods around Bahnhofstraße (“Railway Station Street”) and Tuchrahmstraße (“Tenter Street” – a not at all surprising street name for a town with a history of clothmaking), with others following in the 20th century, such as Am Holler (“At the Elderberry Tree”), In der Haischbach and around the outlying centre of Diedelkopf. The most important administrative buildings stand on Trierer Straße (district administration, the financial office, the local court, the police station) and on the Marketplace (Town Hall, which also serves as the administrative centre of the Verbandsgemeinde). The Evangelical church (Stadtkirche or “Town Church”) likewise stands on Marktplatz (the Marketplace), while the Catholic church stands on the edge of the Old Town on Lehnstraße. Since 1980, a cultural centre has stood on the Roßberg with a school centre (vocational schools and Hauptschule) and the great Fritz-Wunderlich-Halle. Further schools are scattered across the town, the Gymnasium in the west on Walkmühlstraße (“Walking Mill Street”), the Realschule on Lehnstraße, the Luitpoldschule (the town's oldest school building) near the Marketplace on Luitpoldstraße, the Hollerschule (for children with learning difficulties) and the Jakob-Muth-Schule (for children with mental handicaps), both on Hollerstraße. The new hospital was built in 1984 and stands west of town, just beyond the limit in the municipality of Ruthweiler. Barracks arose in 1965 at the Windhof (despite the name, not a wind farm) near the Ödesberg in the town's north end. Various sports facilities are spread over the town's whole area. The main thoroughfare is Bundesstraße 420, which runs through town by way of Glanstraße, Fritz-Wunderlich-Straße and western Trierer Straße. Until the time after the Second World War, a railway line also ran through the town, roughly parallel to Bundesstraße 420. Today, Kusel only has an end-of-line station on the Kusel—Landstuhl line. The railway station in the town's east end has since been torn down.

=== Climate ===
Yearly precipitation in Kusel amounts to 863 mm, which is rather high, falling into the highest third of the precipitation chart for all Germany. At 74% of the German Weather Service's weather stations lower figures are recorded. The driest month is April. The most rainfall comes in December. In that month, precipitation is 1.8 times what it is in April. Precipitation varies moderately. At 50% of the weather stations, lower seasonal swings are recorded.

== History ==
=== Antiquity ===
In the area around the town, many Celtic graves from the Iron Age have been unearthed. The Celtic population adopted Roman culture once Julius Caesar had conquered Gaul, and there have been Gallo-Roman archaeological finds throughout the region as well as in Kusel itself. In the time of the Migration Period (or Völkerwanderung), the area was first conquered by the Burgundians and then later by the Alemanni. As a result of the 496 Battle of Tolbiac (Zülpich), Kusel found itself under Frankish hegemony, and became, either by sale or donation, part of the Imperial domain around Kaiserslautern.

=== Middle Ages ===
In the 7th century, a Frankish kingly estate was built on the ruins of an old Roman estate. This served as a lodging, the Curtis Cosla. Since the name Cosla is of Celtic origin, it cannot be ruled out that there might have been continuous habitation here since prehistoric times. Thus, it is assumed that the town already existed when the so-called Remigiusland was given to the Bishopric of Reims. A royal donation to Reims did not come about through King Clovis I’s efforts towards Saint Remigius as it is claimed in Flodoard’s account of the history of the Bishopric of Reims, but rather more likely through Merovingian King Childebert II’s efforts towards Archbishop Egidius of Reims sometime between 575 and 590. In 850, the estate had its first documentary mention. In the 9th century, the estate and the surrounding lands found themselves in the ownership of the Archbishopric of Reims, whose founder was Saint Remigius. The formerly kingly estate underwent changes by monks, who made of it a monastic estate, and thus it became the centre of ecclesiastical and economic interests in the Remigiusland. A preserved altar text bears witness to a church consecration performed in 902 by Archbishop Herive from Reims. It was an earlier church, Saint Remigius’s Church (Remigiuskirche), that stood where the Evangelical church now stands, on the marketplace. Herive declared it the first “mother church” for the whole area. In 931, the estate at Kusel along with the surrounding area was transferred to the Abbey of Saint-Remi in Reims. In 1127, the monks from Reims built a Benedictine collegiate foundation on the nearby Remigiusberg (mountain), which made the Remigiusberg into the ecclesiastical hub of the whole Remigiusland. The estate at Kusel, represented by a court Schultheiß, became an administrative seat. From the beginning, Kusel was the centre of the Remigiusland. After the Carolingian Empire had been partitioned, however, Reims had a great deal of difficulty exerting its claims over its more distant holdings in Germany. In 10th-century documents, Kusel is described as an abbatia (“abbey”, by Otto I, Holy Roman Emperor in 952) and once as a curtis (“estate” by Otto II, Holy Roman Emperor in 965). Kusel must thus in the 10th century still have been the location of a monastery and an estate. The town's and the Remigiusland’s ownership by the Archbishopric of Reims was acknowledged by all German kings into the High Middle Ages, as was ownership by the Abbey of Saint-Remi in Reims beginning in 952. Kusel, as an abbey and estate town, must have been a key location for the Archbishopric of Reims at this time. It is not known when the abbey was dissolved. It obviously no longer existed about 1125 when the new Benedictine provostry was founded on the Remigiusberg east of town. This founding stripped Kusel of its importance to the Archbishopric of Reims as an estate. Further information from the High Middle Ages is sparse. If the “mystery poet” Cäsarius von Heisterbach's poem can be taken seriously, Kusel Market was plundered in the early 13th century, and this deed would surely have been perpetrated by vassals of neighbouring counts attacking Reims holdings. About 1112, a scion of the Nahegau counts named Gerlach was hired as an Advocatus (or, to use the German form of the word, Vogt) to protect the Remigiusland. As Vogt (lay church official charged with looking after church properties) over further ecclesiastical holdings of the Archbishopric of Reims and the Bishopric of Verdun, and as holder in his own right of lands in the Nahegau, he founded the County of Veldenz (1127–1444). Thus arose a power struggle between the owners of the Remigiusland – since 952 the Abbey of Saint-Remi in Reims – and the Counts of Veldenz. Clear signs of the power struggle were the castles, built unlawfully by the Counts of Veldenz, Castle Lichtenberg and Michelsburg on the Remigiusberg. The former was built nearby about 1214, and is nowadays known as Germany's biggest castle ruin (425 m long, 382 m above sea level). In 1387, Kusel was mentioned in a document from the Counts of Veldenz as Cuscheln der Stat, the last word being an archaic form of Stadt, the German word for “town”. Town fortification with moats, walls, towers and gates began. In 1444, Kusel was transferred to the Duchy of Palatine Zweibrücken, for the Counts of Veldenz had died out in the male line. Castle Lichtenberg became the Oberamt of Lichtenberg. The struggle over the small Reims area was also pursued by the Dukes (originally Counts Palatine) of Zweibrücken. This struggle ended only in 1552, when the Remigiusland was sold to Zweibrücken for 8,500 Rhenish guilders. Kusel is known to have been granted town rights on the Kaiserslautern model in 1347 by Charles IV, Holy Roman Emperor, as witnessed by a text in the Obermoschel town book. No document of the actual deed is preserved, however. Information appearing in some sources, according to which Kusel already had town rights in the 12th century, cannot be confirmed. In 1386, Kusel was first described as a town in a document that has survived to the present day. After the monastery on the Remigiusberg was founded and Castle Lichtenberg was built, the so-called Kuseler Oberhof (“Kusel High Court”) continued to exist. This was a court of Schöffen (roughly “lay jurists”) that kept its function as a legal institution even after the Remigiusland was sold to the Counts Palatine of Zweibrücken. In 1758, Zweibrücken administration of the Oberamt of Lichtenberg was moved back to Kusel.

=== Modern times ===
In the 16th century, the Kusel region was thrice stricken by the Plague. Several times, Kusel was utterly destroyed. The first great destruction came in 1635 during the Thirty Years' War when Croatian troops of the Imperial army under General Matthias Gallas got into the town by cunning, killed more than half the townsfolk and then set the town ablaze. It took 40 years to build the town back up, but then came the second great destruction in 1675 or 1677 (sources differ), wrought by French King Louis XIV's soldiers during the Franco-Dutch War. Much of the town was once again burnt down. There were further great losses among the populace, and parts of the town were destroyed.

==== Recent times ====
During the French Revolution, Kusel was burnt down for the third time in 1794. Within half an hour, all the town's inhabitants had to leave, under threat of death, before the soldiers set all the houses on fire. The town burnt down and only two houses were left standing, among them the Reformed inspectorate house, today the Evangelical deaconry building. Nevertheless, French Revolutionary troops meant to spare the people's lives. One story has it that the town was burnt down because somebody there was printing counterfeit assignats. This assertion cannot be proved, but there were certainly false assignats in town, as there were almost everywhere, and it is believed that the French were even offered false assignats in a bid to ransom some hostages. It is likelier, though, that the burning of Kusel was meant as a general example to others in the hope that they would thereafter desist from falsifying assignats. According to another version of the story, six houses were left standing afterwards. The deed is said in this case to have been a punishment for the town's having supplied a few townsmen who had been held hostage in Metz with money (not specifically assignats), which had then turned out to be counterfeit, and apparently made in Kusel. It has also been hypothesized that it was actually Kasel (near Trier) that was supposed to be destroyed, and that Kusel was burnt down instead owing to a spelling mistake in the soldiers’ orders. Kusel grew gradually into a town of craftsmen and weavers. On 26 July 1794, French Revolutionary troops occupied the town (and burnt it down). During the time of French rule, Kusel kept its administrative function, but only as the seat of a canton. As compensation for the town's destruction, though, the institution of a peace court was promised. The town lay during the time of French annexation in the Arrondissement of Birkenfeld and the Department of Sarre. In 1813 the army of Napoleon, retreating to France after his defeat at the battle of Leipzig, stopped at Kusel the 24 November; general Frédéric Henri Walther died in town that night from sequels of the battle. After victory over Napoleon in 1815, Kusel was at first subject to a joint Prussian-Bavarian-Austrian Landesadministrationskommission (“State Administration Commission”), which was responsible for ascertaining new borders. Under the new order, the town was assigned in 1818 to the Bavarian Rheinkreis – a new exclave of that kingdom created by the Congress of Vienna – as the seat of a Landkommissariat (later Bezirksamt and now district). During the 19th century, the town's industrialization began, which also led to the downfall of such traditional crafts as hat making, linen weaving and stocking knitting. Dwellers of the villages around Kusel for decades travelled worldwide plying their trade as travelling musicians (Wandermusikanten). Kusel is often seen nowadays as the hub of this movement, even though the town itself yielded very few of these Wandermusikanten. The first watermain was laid in 1824. Voluntary donations funded the Maximilianbrunnen (fountain). Between 1850 and 1880, important cloth and knitting yarn factories were founded (Zöllner, Ehrenspeck, Fickeissen). In 1868, the railway from Landstuhl to Kusel was built, which brought the town great economic advantages. In the local quarries, “cuselite” was being mined for use as paving stones and for building railways. Also springing up were breweries, machine foundries, wool weaving factories, brickyards, printing shops and smithies making chains or nails. The town also became the regional agricultural hub with its livestock markets (later the Autumn Fair). Towards the end of the Second World War, the town was repeatedly bombed by Allied fighter-bombers and also by bigger aircraft. One air raid alone, on 6 January 1945, destroyed much of the town and killed 37 people. After 1945, new industrial operations arose, new building areas were opened (Holler-Siedlung) and schools were built. Further political changes came only with the realignment of political entities after the war and with the founding of the new state of Rhineland-Palatinate. As early as 1939, the village of Diedelkopf was amalgamated with Kusel, while the same was done with the village of Bledesbach on 17 March 1974. In the course of administrative restructuring in Rhineland-Palatinate in 1968, the town became the seat of a Verbandsgemeinde administration. Today the Verbandsgemeinde of Kusel-Altenglan consists of 34 municipalities. The district has remained, although its boundaries have now and then been adjusted. After the First World War, the Canton of Waldmohr in the Bezirksamt of Homburg was grouped into the Kusel district, while after the Second World War, six municipalities in the Oster valley passed to the Saarland. Further realignments took place as part of the administrative restructuring of 1969 to 1972. In 1964, Kusel became a garrison town. A smaller garrison was already in the town in 1938, billeted in a simple barracks camp. Only after the Second World War did the barracks buildings on the Windhof come into being. They are named the Unteroffizier-Krüger-Kaserne.

=== Population development ===
In 1609, a population count yielded a figure of 568 inhabitants. In the final stage of the Thirty Years' War, there may have been few people left living in the town. The population figure was strongly bolstered, however, by returning refugees and newcomers by the time of the Franco-Dutch War, but quickly fell down once again in the destruction wrought in that war. It was the French themselves who promoted quick repopulation. In 1693 there were 150 people living in Kusel. Only about the middle of the 18th century, though, did the town's population once again reach its 1609 level. According to lists of losses, at the time when the French burnt the town down, 1,334 people called Kusel home. The people now lived in the ruins or sought shelter in the outlying villages. By 1802, the town once again had 1,267 inhabitants. Population growth went into a marked upswing brought on by the industrialization that was now setting in, although the trend was not quite as strong as it was in some of the Palatinate's other towns and cities. The 6,000 mark was reached only after the Second World War, and only for a short time. In 1928, Kusel had 3,588 inhabitants who broke down denominationally thus: 3,019 Protestants, 486 Catholics, 66 Jews, 12 dissenters.

The following table shows population development over the centuries for Kusel:

| Year | 1609 | 1695 | 1802 | 1834 | 1871 | 1895 | 1910 | 1928 | 1939 | 1961 | 1976 | 2005 | 2008 |
| Total | 568 | 150 | 1,267 | 2,328 | 2,715 | 2,965 | 3,503 | 3,588 | 4,410 | 5,509 | 6,170 | 5,762 | 5,444 |

=== Town’s name ===
The oldest known form of the town's name, Cosla, is to be found in the Remigiustestament, a document that is likely a forgery by Archbishop Hincmar of Reims (806-882). It is a Celtic word matching the names of a whole series of little brooks and rivers in France that bear the name Côle, such as this one. The circumflex accent in this name indicates a suppressed S. The town's name originally referred to the brook that flowed through town, making its meaning simply “settlement on the Cosla brook”. Other forms of the name that the town has borne over the ages are Chuosla (902), abbatiam nomine Coslam (952), Chusela (about 1200), Cuslea (1217), Cussla (1127), Consula (1235), zu Cuselen (1314), Koschela (1347), Cuscheln die Stadt (1387), Kuschel (1395), Cuselle (1428), Cussel (1747) and Cusel (1824).

=== Vanished villages and cadastral names ===
Although forestry and agriculture only play a minor role in the town's economy these days, Kusel has a rather great area within its limits and extensive woodlands. These are found mainly in the Winterhell, on the Gaisberg and around the Gailbach. Rural cadastral names within town limits often refer to vanished villages, for example “Dimbsweiler Höh”, “Grehweiler” and “Haupweiler Grund”. Former owners’ names also show up in rural cadastral names such as “Lauers Bösch” and “Metternachs Wieß”. The Family Metternach was a mediaeval noble family with great landholds in the Kusel area. Yet other rural cadastral names refer to the land's attributes, like “Bruchhell” (“wet sloped land”) or “Weingarten” (literally “wine garden”, and therefore “vineyard”). Indeed, there was winegrowing in Kusel until the 18th century. The rural cadastral name “Feist”, despite its meaning (“fat” or “adipose”), is geological in origin, for it refers to a particular Permian formation known in German as Feistkonglomerat. Vanished villages known from records to have existed within Kusel's current limits are Heubweiler, Dimschweiler and Peychnillenbach.

== Religion ==
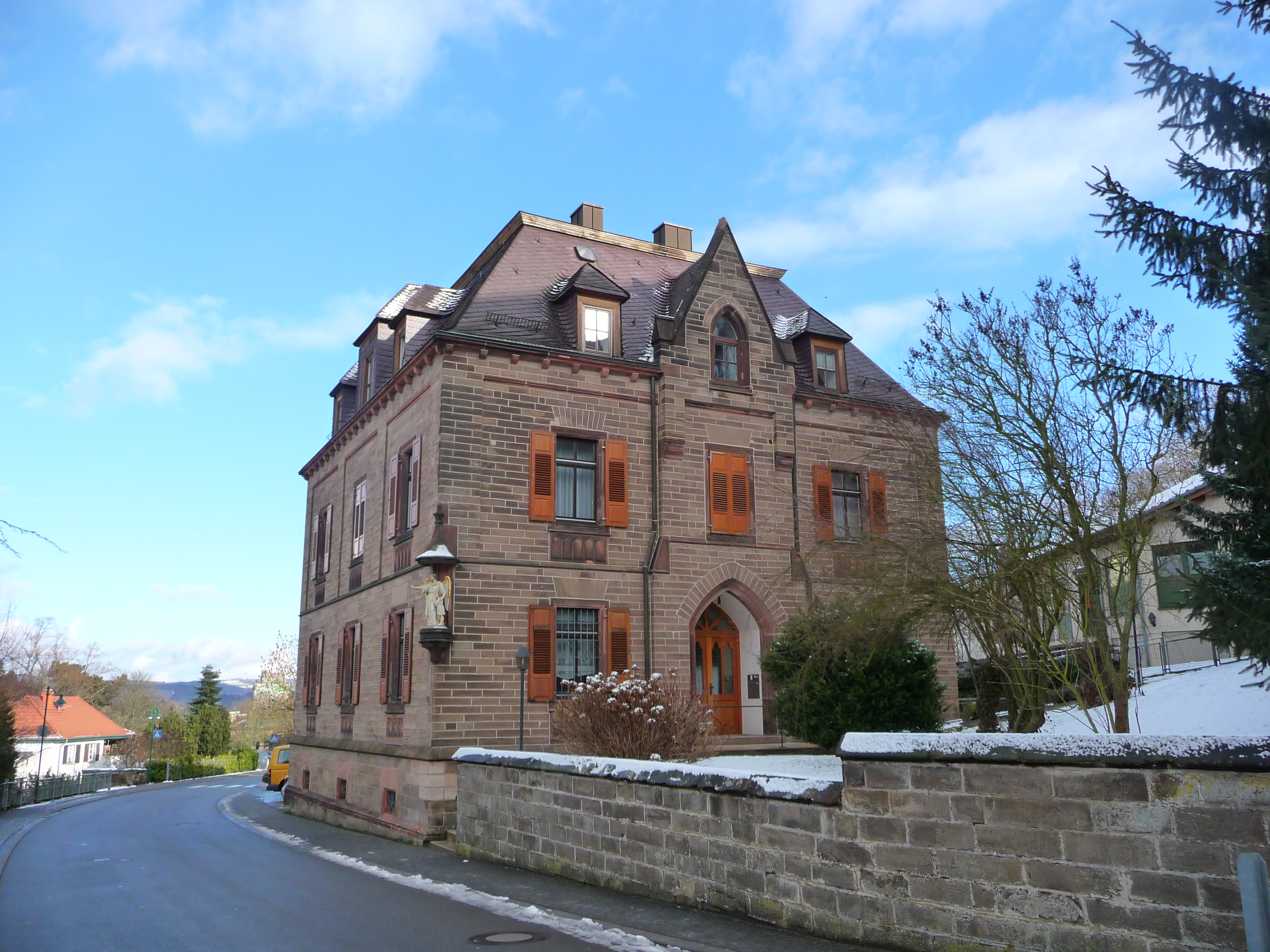
Catholic rectory of St. Ägidius (Saint Giles)

The area between the marketplace and the Neues Tor (“New Gate”) on Trierer Straße, which is still only lightly settled today, may well originally have been the place where the Archbishopric of Reims established its estate. Here stood a monastery with a church. The first church, mentioned in 902, can be considered a forerunner to today's Stadtkirche (“Town Church”). Going by the earlier church's foundations, attempts have been made to reconstruct the old church in model form. This small Romanesque church had fallen into disrepair over the ages, not least of all because so many wealthy townsmen over time had had themselves buried in it. It was torn down in 1712, and on the same spot rose the new Baroque church, built by Master Builder Johannes Koch from Zweibrücken. In 1794, though, this church was destroyed when the French burnt the town down. Wall remnants were then torn down, and between 1829 and 1831, building work yielded the Classicist Town Church that still stands today. With respect to denominational development, the ecclesiastical policy practised by the Counts Palatine of Zweibrücken held true for Kusel. Thus, beginning in 1523, Duke Ludwig II put forth efforts to establish the Reformation according to Martin Luther’s teachings. Ludwig II died only nine years later, though, in 1532, and his brother Ruprecht, who was Ludwig’s son’s regent in the time before the boy, Wolfgang, was old enough to assume leadership duties, pushed the late Ludwig’s policy through and reformed the County Palatine under the principle of cuius regio, eius religio. Count Palatine (Duke) Johannes I, Ludwig II’s grandson, Wolfgang’s son and a follower of the reformer John Calvin led the County Palatine to another great turn in its denominational history in 1588. All subjects now had to set aside their Lutheran faith and adopt Reformed beliefs according to Calvin’s teachings (Calvinism). This forcible conversion led to various problems, particularly among the Evangelical clergy. This change in religious belief was imposed on all places in the Duchy of Palatine Zweibrücken. The difference between Luther’s and Calvin’s teachings should be briefly explained. An example of Lutheran teaching is the concept that man does not find his way to God simply by doing good works, but only through belief (sola fide). Calvinist teaching, on the other hand, holds that man’s fate is predetermined by God, and that the faithful can fulfil this predetermination and must submit themselves to strict church discipline through obedience and diligence, and by forgoing worldly pleasures. Disobedience to God, however, is the way to hell (double predestination). The sociologist Max Weber (1864–1920) took the view that Calvin’s demands led to an “inner asceticism”, which bestowed great wealth upon man. If Weber's thesis was right, this would mean that Calvin was – unwittingly and perhaps also unwillingly – among those who paved the way for capitalism. The town's Catholic Christians from the late 17th century onwards had the right to use the Town Church for their own services along with the Reformed Christians under a simultaneum. For Christians of the Lutheran denomination, a small church was built at the southern town wall on the Bangert and consecrated in 1748. After the union of the Calvinists and the Lutherans in the Union of 1818, the little Lutheran church was turned over to the Catholics. When a new Catholic church was completed on Lehnstraße, the former Lutheran church was torn down. There were other churches in Kusel. From the High Middle Ages on, Saint Giles’s Church (Ägidienkirche) stood near the great Town Church. It was used as a graveyard chapel. It fell into disrepair after the town graveyard was moved in 1564. Meanwhile, a burial chapel was built at the new graveyard in the Weibergraben. This was torn down when the town graveyard was moved once again in 1896 to the place where it still lies today, on the road to Rammelsbach. Moreover, the little Kreuzkapelle (“Cross Chapel”) stood available to travellers and those passing through before the Untertor (“Lower Gate”) in the Middle Ages. After the Reformation, it was abandoned and in 1702 it was torn down. In 1900 there were plans to build a synagogue. Since many Jews were then leaving the town, however, the plans never came to fruition. Until the time of the Third Reich, when they were deported to the camps by the Nazis, there was a room on Ziegelgässchen (“Little Brick Lane”) where Jews could gather. Other religious communities in town are the Baptists or Evangelische Freikirche Kusel (Free Baptist Community) with a centre since 1985 in Kusel-Diedelkopf, Trierer-Straße 117, and some 40 members (2000), and the New Apostolic Church since 1933 with some 180 members and a centre at Fritz-Wunderlich-Straße 24. In 2007, 62.2% of the inhabitants were Evangelical and 18.4% were Catholic. The rest either adhered to other faiths or professed none.

== Politics ==
=== Town council ===
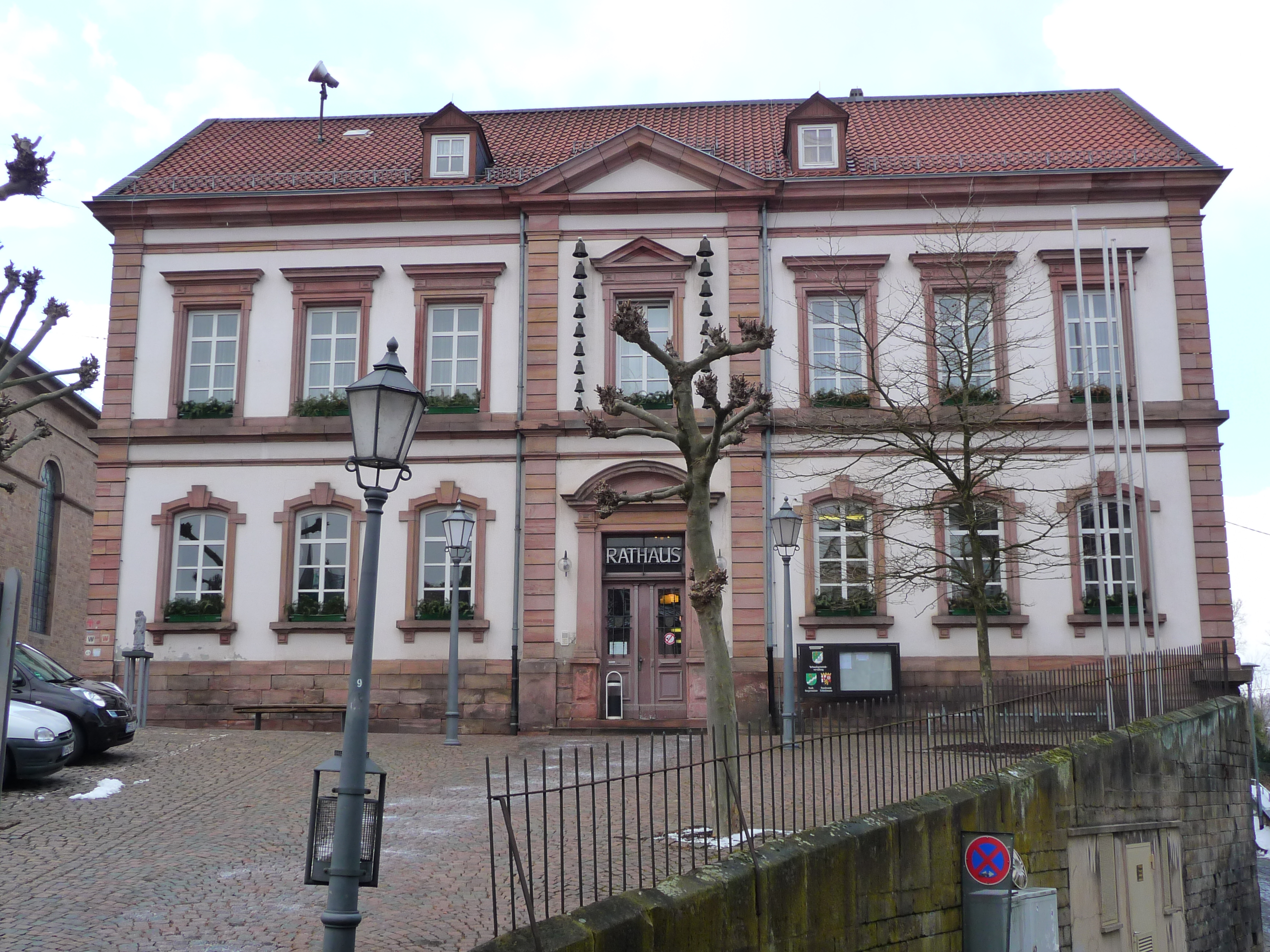
Town Hall with carillon

The council is made up of 20 council members, who were elected by proportional representation at the municipal election held on 25 May 2014, and the honorary mayor as chairwoman.

Municipal elections yielded the following results:

| Election | SPD | CDU | GRÜNE | FWG | FDP | Total |
| 2014 | 9 | 6 | 3 | 2 | – | 20 seats |
| 2009 | 12 | 6 | 2 | 2 | – | 22 seats |
| 2004 | 10 | 7 | 1 | 3 | 1 | 22 seats |

FWG = Freie Wählergruppe Stadt Kusel

=== Mayor ===
Kusel's mayor is Jochen Hartloff (SPD).

=== Coat of arms ===
The German blazon reads: In Grün ein aufgerichteter, wachsender, goldener Krummstab, belegt mit einem silbernen Schräglinkswellenbalken.

The town's arms might in English heraldic language be described thus: Vert issuant from base a bishop's staff Or surmounted by a bend sinister wavy argent.

The main charge in these arms, the bishop's staff, is a reference to the village's former allegiance to the Archbishopric of Reims, which held Kusel and the countryside all around it, the so-called Remigiusland, up until the 16th century. The “bend sinister wavy” (slanted wavy stripe) stands for the Kuselbach, the brook that flows through town. The arms in this composition go back to old town seals, particularly one used as far back as 1624. The arms were approved in 1841 by King Ludwig I of Bavaria (Kusel lay in the Kingdom of Bavaria at that time owing to the new, post-Napoleonic order imposed by the Congress of Vienna).

=== Town partnerships ===
Kusel fosters partnerships with the following places:

- Toucy, Yonne, France since 1973
- Zalaegerszeg, Zala County, Hungary since 1997

== Culture and sightseeing ==
=== Buildings ===
The following are listed buildings or sites in Rhineland-Palatinate’s Directory of Cultural Monuments:

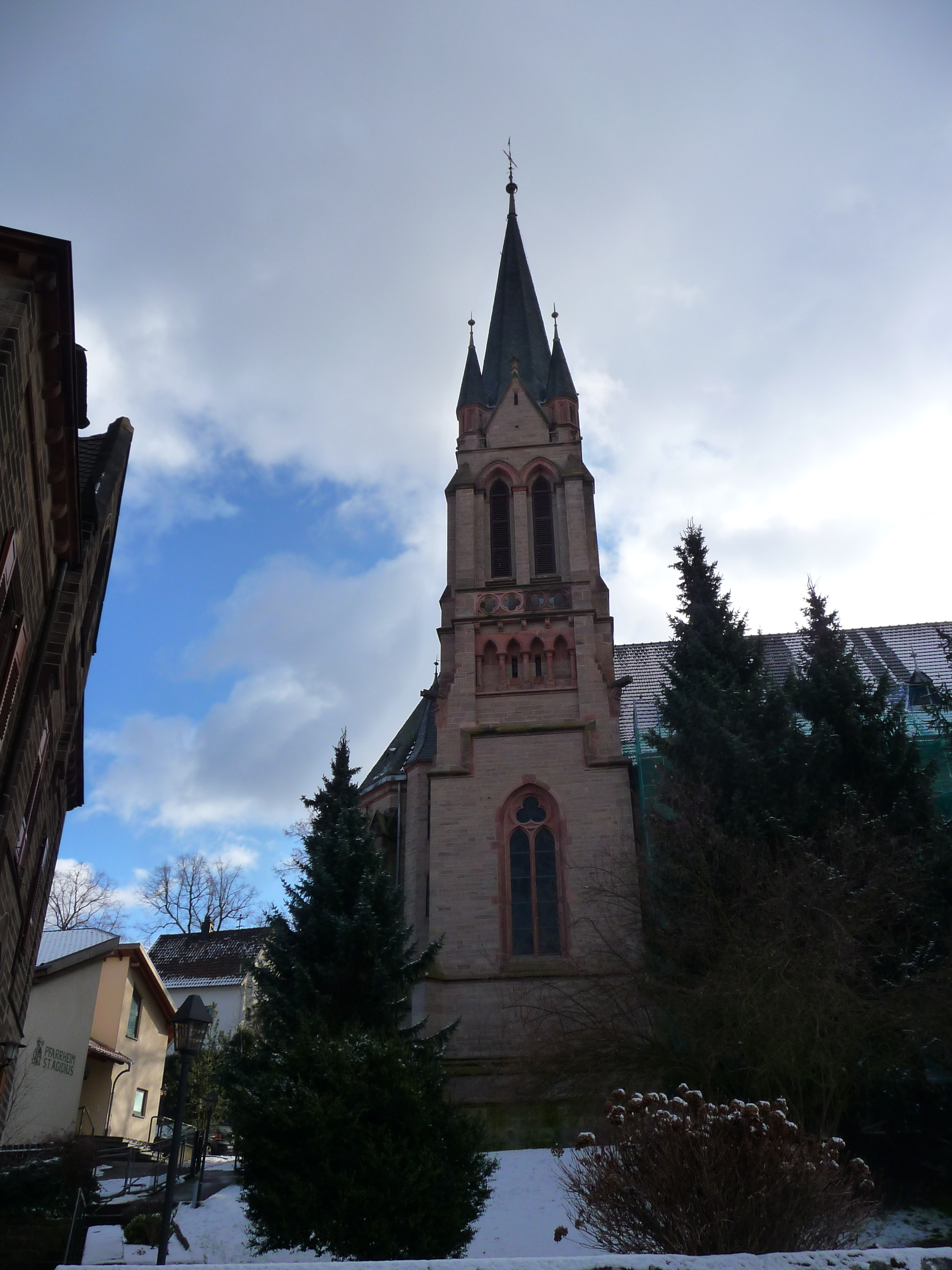
Lehnstraße 10: Saint Giles’s Catholic Parish Church (Pfarrkirche St. Ägidius)

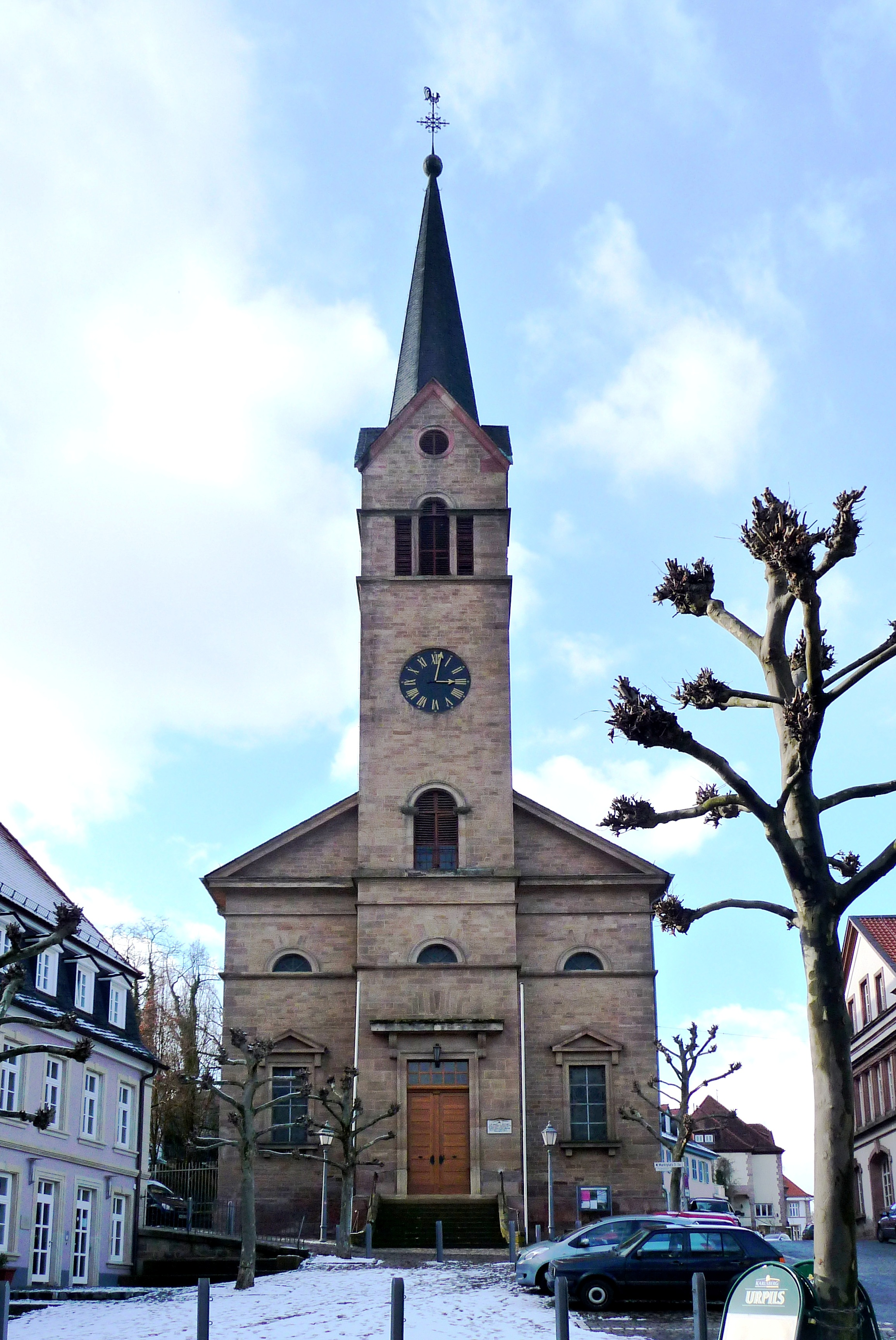
Marktplatz 2: Protestant parish church

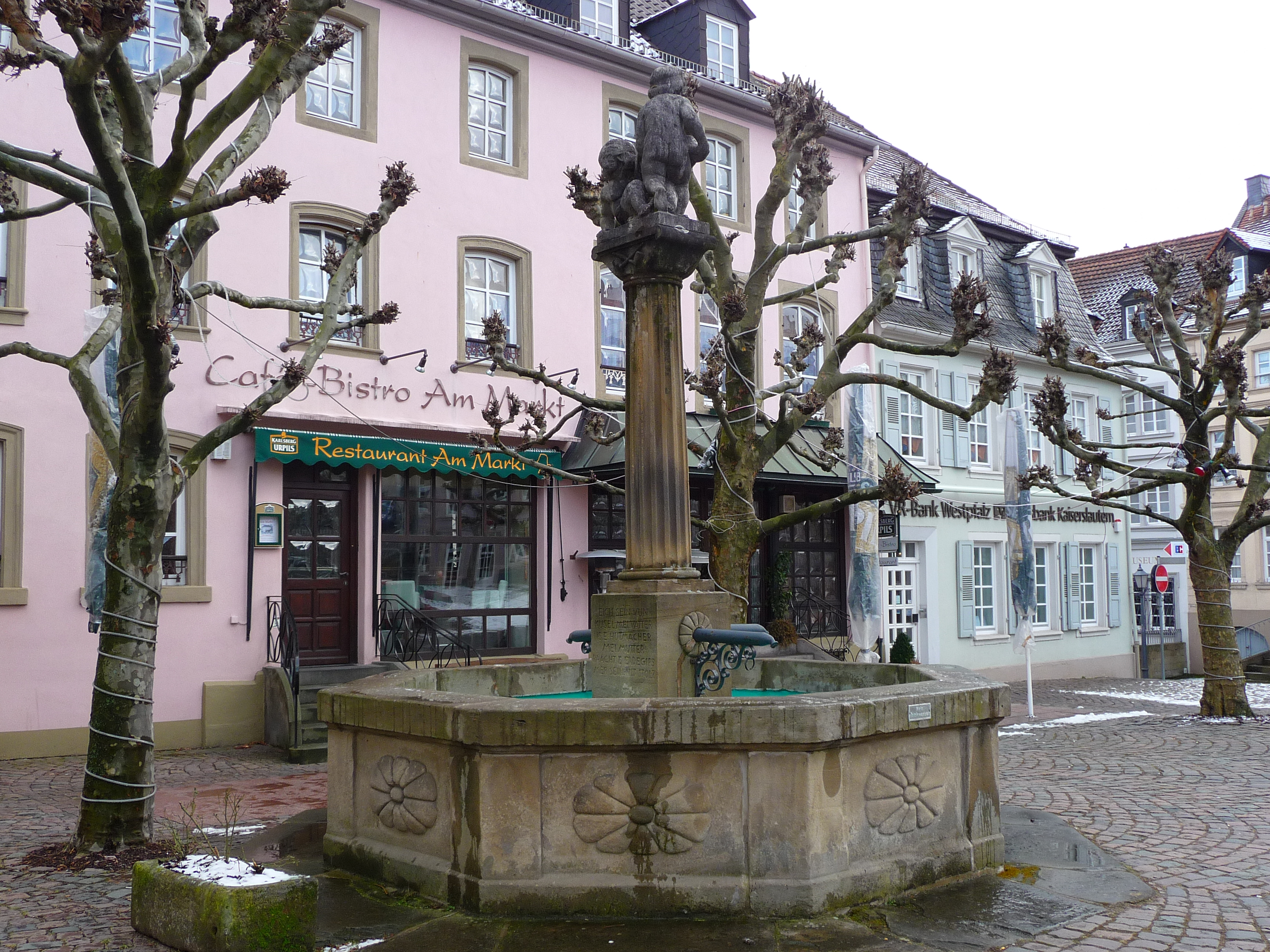
Near Marktplatz 6: Hutmacherbrunnen (“Hatter’s Fountain”)

==== Kusel (main centre) ====
- Saint Giles’s Catholic Parish Church (Pfarrkirche St. Ägidius), Lehnstraße 10 – Gothic Revival pseudobasilica, sandstone-block building, 1887–1889, architect Franz Schöberl, Speyer; furnishings
- Protestant parish church, Marktplatz 2 – Classicist sandstone-block building, 1829–1831, architect Ferdinand Beyschlag, Kaiserslautern, tower helm 1861, architect Johann Schmeisser, Kusel; furnishings, Stumm organ from 1848
- Bahnhofstraße 22 – three-floor Late Historicist living and commercial house with gated driveway, 1900
- Bahnhofstraße 25 – stately Late Historicist corner house with mansard roof, 1899
- Bahnhofstraße 28/30 – former “Pfälzer Hof”; three-floor sandstone-framed plastered building with stone-block-faced ground floor, 1896; in the yard remnants of the former beergarden buildings; characterizes town's appearance
- Bahnhofstraße 55 – Historicist clinker brick building on stone-block-faced ground floor, Renaissance Revival motifs, 1888
- Bahnhofstraße 58 – lavishly decorated Baroque Revival villa with mansard roof, 1902, architect K. Herrmann, Kusel
- Bahnhofstraße 59 – former Royal Bavarian Rentamt (financial administration office); Historicist stone-block building with hipped roof, 1894/1895, architect Bauamtmann Stempel, Kaiserslautern
- Bahnhofstraße 61 – postal estate with service building, vehicle hall and bungalow; 1925, architect Heinrich Müller, Speyer; five-axis building with mansard roof, Swiss chalet style, Expressionist relief by E. A. Rauch, Munich
- Bahnhofstraße 104 – former gasworks; thirteen-axis, one-floor stone-block building, 1887–1889; workshop with lodging and bathroom, 1907
- Gartenstraße 3, 7, 9 and 6 and 8, Fritz-Wunderlich-Straße 12a, 14, 16, 18, 20, Vogelsang 1 (monumental zone) – ensemble of villas and semi-detached houses in the town expansion zone, 1902–1913/1922
- Glanstraße, graveyard (monumental zone) – laid out in 1896; warriors’ memorial 1870-1871, 1914-1918 by Regional Master Builder Foltz (1921) and 1939/1945; Family Zöllner's grave complex, about 1905; elaborate gravestones, 1920s
- Haselrech 1 – former agricultural school; spacious building with hipped roof, pedestal ground floor with garages and entrance hall, Swiss chalet style, 1929, architect Regional Assistant Builder Leidemer and Oberste Baubehörde, Munich
- Landschaftsstraße 4/6 – former tribunal building; thirteen-axis plastered building on high basement complex, 1811–1814
- Landschaftsstraße 7 – building with hipped roof on big vaulted basement, essentially about 1800, partly older (spiral staircase)
- Lehnstraße 12 – Catholic rectory; angular sandstone-block building on high pedestal, hipped mansard roof, 1889, architect Franz Schöberl, Speyer
- Luitpoldstraße 1 – Protestant rectory I; five-axis building with hipped roof, marked 1760, architect Philipp H. Hellermann
- Luitpoldstraße 3 – Protestant rectory II; villalike building with hipped roof on irregular floor plan, 1907/1908, architect Regional Master Builder Kleinhans
- Luitpoldstraße 14 – Luitpoldschule (school); three-floor sandstone-framed building with hipped roof, one-floor addition, 1911/1912, architect Regional Master Builder Kleinhans; characterizes town's and street's appearance
- Luitpoldstraße 7, 8, 9, 10, 12, 14, Schleipweg 11 (monumental zone) – Luitpoldschule with U-shaped dwelling building built around the forecourt made up of four officials’ houses, 1922/1923, architect Foltz, characterizes town's appearance
- Marktplatz 1 – Town Hall (former primary school); sandstone-framed plastered building, 1891, architect Regional Building Director Mergler and Assistant Builder Hass, 1913 town hall conversion; characterizes square's appearance
- Marktplatz 3 – former Alte Volksschule (“Old Primary School”); eleven-axis building with hipped roof, 1821, architect Heinrich Ernst
- Near Marktplatz 6 – Hutmacherbrunnen (“Hatter’s Fountain”); sandstone basin with sandstone pillar, 1921 by Emil Berndt, two muschelkalk putti by Müller-Hipper, Munich
- Marktplatz 3a, 4, 5, 6, 7, 8, 9, Marktstraße 19–35, 41, 43 and 36–54 and Bangertstraße 35, 37, 39, Weiherplatz 1–7, 11, 13 as well as 2–14, 20–26, 30–32 and Tuchrahmstraße 2 and 4, town centre (monumental zone) – characteristic small-town townscape around the marketplace, Weiherplatz and the adjoining streets, largely linked buildings from the time after the town's reconstruction after the fire about 1800, on the marketplace the rather representative buildings, on Weiherplatz craftsmen's houses
- Marktstraße 16 – inn “Zur Alten Post”; stately Late Baroque building with hipped mansard roof on double vaulted basement, before 1797
- Marktstraße 27 – three-floor plastered building, elaborately worked façade, after 1795
- Marktstraße 31 – sophisticated three-floor plastered building with steep gable roof, behind, two-floor gallery, about 1800
- At Marktstraße 43 – behind, wooden gallery at the “Dickscher Hof”, marked 1800
- Trierer Straße 36 – dwelling building and dance hall of the former Kochsche Brauerei (brewery); building with hipped roof on vaulted basement, before 1807, one-floor Classicist dance hall, 1834
- Trierer Straße 39 – Late Classicist plastered building, elaborately worked façade, 1868
- Trierer Straße 41 – building with hipped roof and knee wall, elaborately worked façade, 1855
- Trierer Straße 49 – former Royal Bavarian Regional Office; representative sandstone-framed building with mansard roof, 1877/1878, architect Bauamtmann Giese, Kaiserslautern, expansion 1912/1913
- Trierer Straße 50 – Late Historicist hewn-stone-framed face brick building, marked 1888, behind, two-floor wooden balcony, garden with shed
- Trierer Straße 51 – former Regional building; building with hipped roof on high pedestal with “attic” level, monumental entrance hall, 1926, architect Regional Master Builder Schardt
- Trierer Straße 60 – former living and production building of the Ehrenspeck stocking-knitting and cloth factory; plastered building with façade with Historicist elements, cast-iron balcony, 1868
- Trierer Straße 65 – representative sandstone-framed plastered building on a fluted stone-block pedestal, Renaissance Revival motifs, marked 1896
- Trierer Straße 68/70, Fritz-Wunderlich-Straße 51 – former cloth factory; no. 70 three-floor factory building; no. 68 representative house, 1878; production building mainly from 1896 to 1908; building after 1895, architect Christoph Berndt, Kusel; whole complex of buildings
- Trierer Straße 69 – former Gilcher mechanized brickworks; five-axis plastered building, elaborately worked façade, 1868
- Trierer Straße 71/73 – Amtsgericht (court); Baroque Revival building with mansard roof and side risalti, joining wing with floor added, three-floor prison, 1902, architect District Building Office Assessor Geyer, Kaiserslautern
- Trierer Straße 75 – villa on irregular floor plan, partly timber-frame, 1899; characterizes street's appearance
- Trierer Straße 39–75 (odd numbers), 44, 50–70 (even numbers), Fritz-Wunderlich-Straße 51 (monumental zone) – built-up zone along Trierer Straße with public administration buildings, former Zöllnersche Tuchfabrik (cloth factory) and houses, 19th century
- Vogelsang 19 – detached house; small plastered building with half-hipped roof, possibly from the 18th century, addition 1954

==== Bledesbach ====
- Eckweg 2 – one-floor sandstone-framed Quereinhaus (a combination residential and commercial house divided for these two purposes down the middle, perpendicularly to the street) on high basement, marked 1877

==== Diedelkopf ====
- Near Brückenweg 5 – village bridge over the Kuselbach, two-arched sandstone-block bridge, marked 1744 and 1797
- Trierer Straße 162/164 – former steam bakery; sophisticated sandstone-framed plastered building with ridge turret, 1912, architect possibly Julius Berndt, Kusel

=== Buildings, theatres and museums ===
The building development at the marketplace is dominated by the Town Hall (Rathaus) with its carillon, the Classicist Evangelical town church and the Hutmacherbrunnen (“Hatter’s Fountain”). The church distinguishes itself with its clear lines, a (rare) strictly symmetrical construction of the altar-pulpit-organ area and the hefty, monolithic round sandstone columns that bear the galleries’ weight.

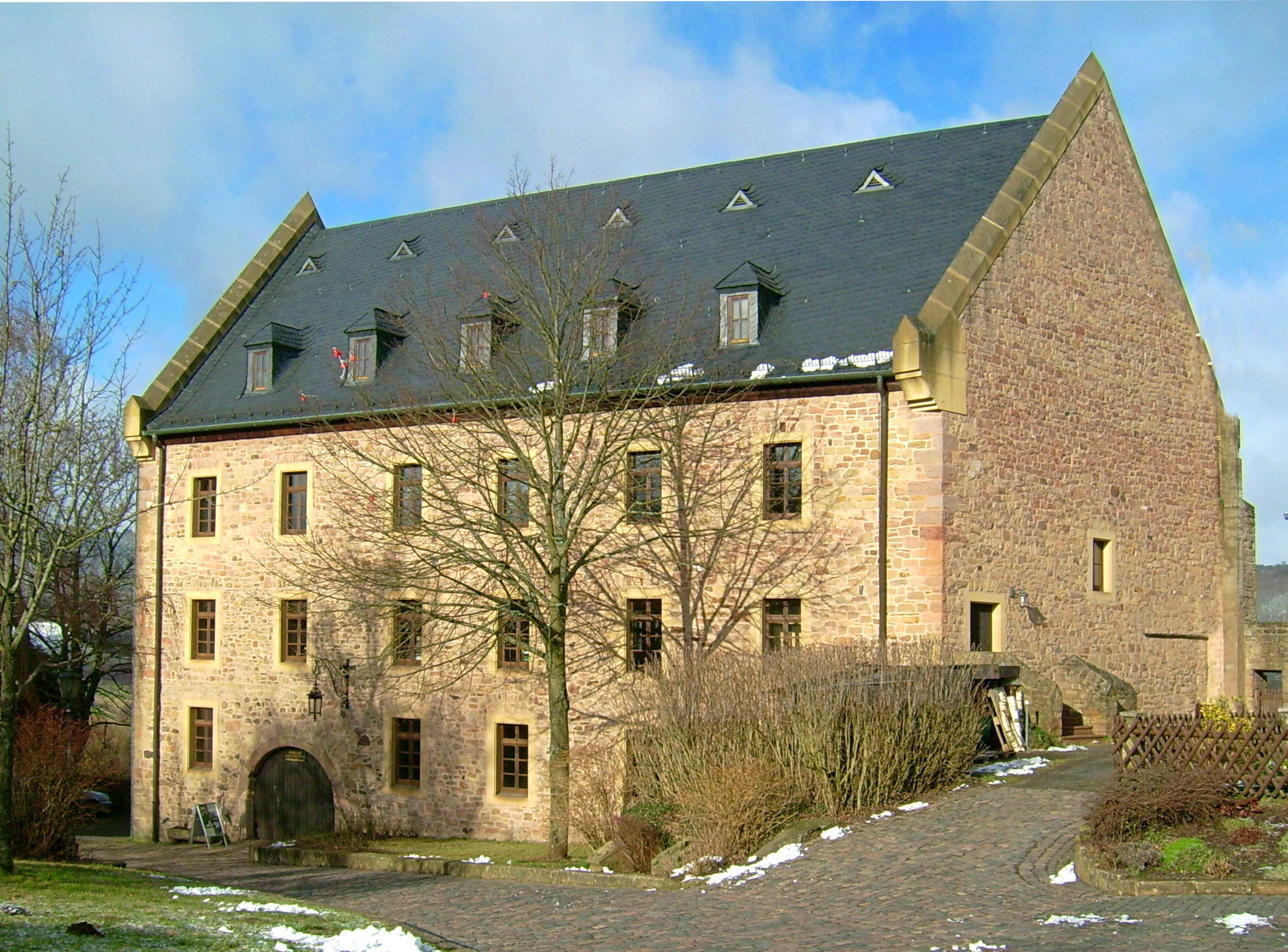
Musikantenland Museum in the tithe barn

Roughly six kilometres’ driving distance from downtown Kusel stands Castle Lichtenberg. With a length of 425 m, it is Germany's biggest castle ruin. It stands near Thallichtenberg. Integrated into the complex is the Musikantenland Museum, which documents the history of the Musikantenland. For more about this cultural phenomenon, see the relevant sections in the article about Hinzweiler (Musikanten and Otto Schwarz). The GEOSKOP museum of the primeval world was opened at the castle as an outpost of the Pfalzmuseum für Naturkunde (Palatine Museum for Natural History) in 1998. It is devoted mainly to the geological history of the local rotliegend rocks.

At the Fritz-Wunderlich-Halle, a multipurpose hall used for presentations, theatre and concert productions, and used by the school centre on the Roßberg as an auditorium, a cultural programme is offered in collaboration with the local authorities. This includes a number of appearances by both German and international touring theatre troupes. Almost all the classics have played on the stage at least once. The Fritz-Wunderlich-Halle was built in 1980 at the school centre on the Roßberg with seating for some 650 spectators.

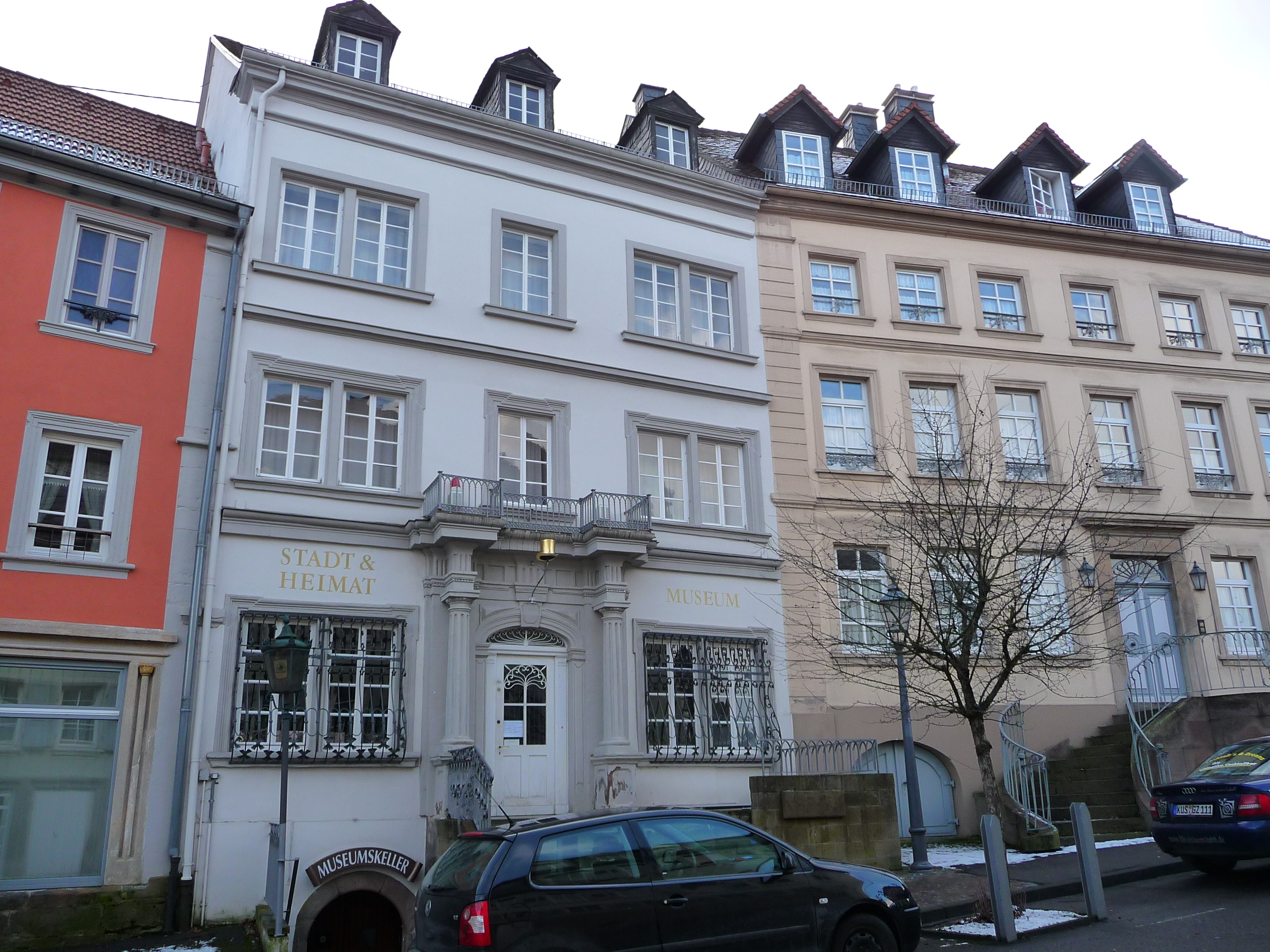
Stadt- und Heimatmuseum (Town and Local History Museum)

Kusel's most important museum is the Stadt- und Heimatmuseum (Town and Local History Museum) on Marktstraße, which houses an extensive collection from the town's history. On show there are, among other things, a permanent exhibit dealing with the great singer and Kusel native Fritz Wunderlich’s life – a favourite among visitors – and another about historically typical household devices of the Palatinate.

=== Regular events ===
The kermis (church consecration festival) formerly held on the third weekend in August is now no longer of any importance. The Kuseler Messe (“Kusel Fair”) or Kuseler Herbstmesse (“Kusel Autumn Fair”), now held on the first weekend in September (Friday evening until Tuesday) is said to be one of the Western Palatinate’s biggest folk festivals. Moreover, there are the Shrovetide (Fasching) market and the Christmas market. On the second Thursday in every month, on the Koch’sches Gelände, a flea market is held. On the second weekend in June, the Hutmacherfest (“Hatters’ Festival”) is celebrated in the Old Town (Altstadt). On 29 May 2010, the yearly Team-Triathlon Kusel was launched for the eleventh time. It is one of Rhineland-Palatinate's biggest leisure-sport events. It involves a combined cycling-swimming-walking relay by teams that must always be made up of three participants, who must be at least 15 years old on the day of the competition. On 25 September 2010, the ninth Team-Duathlon Kusel, with a length of 42 km, took place.

=== Clubs ===
Many clubs promote the town's community life. Particularly worthy of mention are the transport club, the Carnival club, the sport club, the gymnastic club, the Evangelical church choir and the music club. Famous are the church choir's musical events held each year on the fourth Sunday in Advent, and the concerts given by the West Palatine Symphony Orchestra (music club). The choir is nowadays associated with a Gospel choir, which enjoys great popularity.

=== Sport and leisure ===
Kusel's biggest leisure facility is the Verbandsgemeinde-run Spaß- und Freizeitbad (“Fun and Leisure Pool”) in Diedelkopf. It consists of an indoor swimming pool with hot tub, tanning bed, pools for children, non-swimmers and swimmers, the last with a diving setup, and also of an outdoor swimming pool with a playground for children, non-swimmers and swimmers, a fun pool. Also found here are a 64 m-long waterslide that ends in summer at the outdoor swimming pool and in winter at a heated outdoor arm of the indoor swimming pool, and a miniature golf course. Besides two football pitches, one in the outlying centre of Diedelkopf and the other near the way out of town going towards Haschbach am Remigiusberg, there are indoor and outdoor tennis courts on the radial road going towards Blaubach.

== Economy and infrastructure ==
=== Economic structure ===
Given the town's central location, many markets were held in Kusel even as far back as the Middle Ages, although these often had to put up with stiff competition from other traditional markets in other nearby places. The town's economic life in the late 18th century was characterized by many small craftsmen's workshops. There were wool and linen weavers, doublet and hose knitters, clothmakers and hatters as well as walking mills and gristmills, tanneries and several breweries. At the same time, dealers travelling overland from the town did a brisk trade with these products. In the age of industrialization, few of these craftsmen managed to expand their workshops or to switch to new, effective production methods. Thus, many small craft businesses had to cease work, and production was soon concentrated in a few bigger companies. Establishing themselves as such were a few businesses in textile manufacturing. In 1857, the Fink Brothers (their name is actually German for “Finch”) opened a cloth factory on Trierer Straße that had what were then state-of-the-art looms. This factory burnt down in 1865 and was never restored. Besides the Fink Brothers’ factory, two other great textile mills set up shop in Kusel, the Zöllner plant and the Ehrenspeck plant. At the former, it was mostly durable material that was made, for work clothes, such as tirtey (“midweight woollen fabric in twill weave, with a combination of carded woollen yarns in the weft and cotton yarns in the warp. Mostly used for work trousers.”) and buckskin cloth (not leather, but rather a “thick, smooth cotton or woollen fabric”). In 1885 the Zöllner plant, too, burnt down, but unlike the Fink Brothers’ factory, it rose from the ashes and in the years before the First World War, it even underwent an important expansion. It flourished until about 1930, when the Great Depression set in. It was then taken over by Karl Hermann and run until 1958 as the Westpfälzische Tuchfabrik (“West Palatine Cloth Factory”). The Ehrenspeck plant arose from a craft business. It was built on Trierer Straße in 1867. Here, fine knitted wares were made, but this plant, too, burnt down, in 1928. Later, in a portion of the plant, vigogne spinning was temporarily done (this fabric is made of natural, sometimes along with artificial, fibres in imitation of vicuña wool). Moving into the factory after the Second World War was the Tuchfabrik Kahnes, which specializes in making synthetic non-woven fabrics. About 1960, the factory was moved to Haschbacher Straße. The Kahnes Cloth Factory is the only such factory that is still in business in Kusel. Besides the textile works, there were the Schleip nail factory and the Christian Gilcher machine factory in Kusel, both of which are now gone. From the several small breweries originally in town, two grew into major businesses, Koch and Emrich. Koch merged in 1972 with the Bayerische Brauerei in Kaiserslautern, and afterwards was closed. After the building was torn down, a great vacant lot was left, which later saw only minor building (an underground parking garage and the Café Rothenturm). The Emrich Brewery continued as a private brewing company until 1998, when it, too, was closed. A major production business in Kusel today is the high-speed printing machine factory, a subsidiary of Albert in Frankenthal. A computer industry production facility has also located in Kusel, the firm Owen Electronics, as has an important software business, Transware, inpremises formerly occupied by the cloth factory. The town's economic life is otherwise represented foremost by supermarkets and retail businesses, which are housed in an industrial park beside Bundesstraße 420 between Kusel and Rammelsbach.

=== Authorities ===
Kusel is seat of the town, Verbandsgemeinde and district administration of Kusel, a financial office, a forestry office, a surveying and cadastral office and a branch of the Bundesagentur für Arbeit. The Rhineland-Palatinate weights and measures authority (Eichbehörde) once kept an office in Kusel, but this has disappeared. It was housed in the Luitpoldschule building. Stationed in Kusel is the Artillerielehrregiment 345 (“Artillery Teaching Regiment 345”; formerly the Panzerartillerielehrregiment 345), although within the framework of Bundeswehr reform, this is supposed to be moved to Idar-Oberstein. There is an Amtsgericht that belongs to the Landgericht (state court) region of Kaiserslautern and the Oberlandesgericht (superior state court) region of Zweibrücken.

=== Education ===
Historical records yield the first proof of a school in Kusel in 1535. The pupils were all boys, and the assistant pastor had to teach. There was an intention to open a Latin school, but only a small percentage of the schoolchildren was interested in Latin instruction. In 1580, the Deutsche Schule (“German School”) was founded, and attendance was compulsory for all boys. In 1743, a girls’ school arose next to the boys’ school. Soon afterwards, other classes suited to denominational orientation were founded, and there were now new attempts to teach Latin. The Catholic school was attended by schoolchildren from 50 villages in the area. During the Thirty Years' War, schooling had to be suspended for years. No purpose-built schoolhouse stood anywhere in town. Classes were held wherever they could be held, and often schoolteachers used their own houses. Only in the early 19th century did the town have major schoolhouses built, a Protestant one up from the Stadtkirche (“Town Church”) and a Catholic one near where the town hall now stands. In 1912, all primary school classes were moved to the newly built Luitpoldschule. Only after the Second World War was another school built, this one for primary school and Hauptschule, called the Hollerschule. The Luitpoldschule and the Hollerschule nowadays house primary school classes, with a kindergarten. A new Hauptschule for the whole Verbandsgemeinde was built at the school centre on the Roßberg, coming into service in 1981. The Latin school was finally established in 1836, and it was converted into a Progymnasium (a kind of general Gymnasium) in 1892. In 1924, it was taken over by the state, and can be said to be the forerunner of today's Gymnasium. About 1865, the town established a higher school for girls, and at about the same time, a teacher training school came into being. A new school building was built near the town hall, in the area where the administrative wing for the Verbandsgemeinde now stands. After the Bezirksamt (now the district administration) was moved to Trierer Straße about 1879, the former tribunal building – later for a time a museum and the town library – could now be used as a schoolhouse. In 1925, the teacher training school was closed. Only temporarily after the Second World War did a teacher training institute once again exist in Kusel, the Pädagogische Akademie. It was housed in various buildings throughout the town, in its latest time mainly in a newly built building next to the gymnasium on Lehnstraße, which is now the Realschule. The Pädagogische Akademie was moved to Kaiserslautern in 1954. After the Lehnstraße building's conversion, the Gymnasium moved in. Within a few years, though, the school had outgrown the building, and an even bigger school building was built on Walkmühlenstraße (“Walking Mill Street”). This now has some 1,100 students. In 1965, the Realschule was established at the Lehnstraße building. Today's vocational training schools have their origins in a commercial and agricultural further education school that was founded in 1872. In the days before the First World War, there were departments for particular vocational groups. The school's name changed several times. Beginning in 1922, it was called Fortbildungsschule mit Fachklassen (“Further Education School with Subject Classes”), and as of 1930, it bore the sesquipedalian name Berufsfortbildungsschule (“Vocational Further Education School”). After the school was at first likewise housed in the former tribunal building, it was able to move into a new building on Hollerstraße in 1954. Even this building, though, was soon outgrown. The school, now called Berufsbildende Schulen (“Vocational Training Schools”), moved along with the Hauptschule in 1981 to the school centre on the Roßberg. Along with the Berufsbildende Schulen there was, as of 1952, the Heitmann private trade school, housed in the former tribunal building. This has since been merged into the Berufsbildende Schulen. The special school for children with learning difficulties has existed since 1968. It is nowadays housed in the former vocational school on Hollerstraße and is called the Jakob-Muth-Schule für Lernbehinderte. The school now has a branch for children with speech difficulties. Not long before the school for children with learning difficulties, the school for children with mental handicaps was founded, which was later housed in Liebsthal and Blaubach but moved back to Kusel in 1983. It now bears the name Schule mit Förderschwerpunkt für ganzheitliche Entwicklung (“School with Promotional Focus on Integrated Development”) and is housed in the building that formerly housed the Hollerschule. The Jakob-Muth-Schule, the former school for children with mental handicaps, exists today as the Schule mit Förderschwerpunkt Lernen und Sprache (“School with Promotional Focus Learning and Speech”) at the building that formerly housed the vocational school on Hollerstraße. The following educational institutions also exist today in Kusel: the folk high school (administered, like all others in the district, directly by the district), the district music school, the educational psychology service, a branch of the Reha-Zentrum Landstuhl (rehabilitation), the Staatliches Studienseminar für das Lehramt an Grund- und Hauptschulen (state teacher training college for primary and secondary levels), a Realschule plus and a Wirtschaftsgymnasium, the last two both at the school centre on the Roßberg. There are also a few other kindergartens. A district and town library is run in joint sponsorship with the district.

=== Transport ===
Kusel was from the Middle Ages an important way station on the through road leading from Zweibrücken to Meisenheim. In the 19th century, this road lost its original importance with the laying of the Landstuhl–Kusel railway that linked Kusel to Kaiserslautern, which at first was used mainly to transport crushed stone from the quarries in Rammelsbach. The railway was demanded by industrialists and businessmen from Kusel. A further improvement was brought by the Glan Valley Railway when it arrived in the early 20th century. There were rumours, too, that a north-south railway line through Kusel was to be built, but this was never done. Roads of regional importance, foremost among them the Glantalstraße (Glan valley road), were expanded in the 19th century. Fundamentally improved were the transport conditions in the time before the Second World War, when the Westwall (Siegfried Line) was built. The railway was extended to Türkismühle with a spur to Ottweiler (Ostertalbahn), although abandonment of this line began in 1963 and was completed by 1969. More effective was the building of an army road from Oppenheim to Neunkirchen in the Saarland. This is the road now known as Bundesstraße 420 and it runs through Kusel, leading from Nierstein in Rhenish Hesse to Ottweiler in the Saarland. Roughly 7 km to the east, in Konken, is an interchange onto the Autobahn A 62 (Kaiserslautern–Trier), whose completion finally furnished a link to a north-south road. Local public transport is integrated into the VRN, which offers service using Rheinland-Pfalz-Takt (“Rhineland-Palatinate scheduling”). Run since the timetabling change in December 2008 are Deutsche Bahn AG trains of the Talent type. Since line closures in 1970 (Westrichbahn) and 1981 (part of the Glantalbahn), Kusel station has been the terminus of the Glantalbahn rail service, which runs to Kaiserslautern over the Landstuhl–Kusel railway.

== Notable people ==
=== Sons and daughters of the town ===
- Daniel Emil Koch (b. ~1725; d. ~1795 in Neuwied)

A medical doctor, Koch came from the well known family of officials named Koch and was long a governmental councillor in the County Palatine of Zweibrücken, later settling down in Kusel as a doctor. He became known for his vehement criticism of Kusel’s officialdom, whom he accused of great contributory negligence in the great fire of 1794. He put down his allegations in the writ Spezies Facti, which appeared soon after the town was burnt down. After the fire, Koch moved to Neuwied.

- Karl Philipp Koch (b. 1737; d. 1813 in Kusel)

Koch was a church steward, Daniel Emil Koch’s brother (see above) and Wilhelm Daniel Joseph Koch’s father (see below). He took over the office of church steward for the Oberamt of Lichtenberg from his father. He, too, like his brother, was known in connection with the great fire of 1794. After the fire, he moved with two other townsmen from Kusel, Hans Matzenbacher and Philipp Gouturier, to Paris, to receive compensation from the welfare board for Kusel townsmen (it had been the French who had burnt the town down).

- Johann Christian Simon Freiherr von Hofenfels (b. 1744; d. 1787 in Zweibrücken)

A state minister, statesman and diplomat, he stood as an official in the service of the Counts Palatine of Zweibrücken, and at the age of 32 he was raised to nobility. When the Electorate of the Palatinate and Electoral Bavarian lines of the House of Wittelsbach had died out in 1777, Bavaria was to be united with Austria at the emperor's request, leading to the outbreak of the War of the Bavarian Succession. Through deft negotiations, Hofenfels managed to put an end to this war, assuring the ruling Count Palatine and Duke Carl II August's succession in Bavaria.

- Wilhelm Daniel Joseph Koch (b. 1771; d. 1849 in Erlangen)

Physician and politician

- Carl Ludwig Koch (b. 1778; d. 1857 in Nuremberg)

A forester and zoologist, known above all as an entomologist and arachnologist, Koch, who was Wilhelm Daniel Joseph Koch’s brother, worked as a forester in several places in Bavaria and Austria, while on the side working as an avid collector of spiders (so much so that he was nicknamed Spinnenkoch, Spinne being the German word for “spider”). Moreover, he also put together collections of birds and beetles. All his collections met with great regard. Koch bequeathed them to the Ludwig-Maximilians-Universität München and the University of Erlangen. Also by Koch were two important scientific works: Crustaceen, Myriapoden und Arachniden, ein Beitrag zur deutschen Fauna, 40 issues from 1835 to 1844, and Die Arachniden, getreu nach der Natur abgebildet und beschrieben in 16 volumes with 543 coloured tables, Nuremberg 1831-1849.

- Anton Nickel (1805–1874)

Jurist

- Karl Kaerner (b. 1804; d. 1869 in Munich)

Building engineer

- Christian Böhmer (b. 1823; d. 1895 in Bosenbach)

A clergyman and poet, as a pastor he also devoted himself to the art of poetry and was described as Sänger seiner Westricher Heimat (“Singer of his Westrich Homeland”). Among his other publications were Lieder aus der Fremde und Heimat (“Songs from Abroad and the Homeland”, 1855), Frauenschmuck und Frauenspiegel (“Women’s Jewellery and Women’s Mirror”, 1869) and Aus des Remigiusberges ersten Tagen (“From the Remigiusberg’s First Days”, 1870). Böhmer’s tomb is still preserved at the former graveyard in the Weibergraben in Kusel.

- Carl Eduard Fay (b. 1841; d. 1915 in Metz)

A forester, writer and songwriter, Fay was first a forester in the South Palatinate and later in Alsace. He wrote several textbooks about forestry and wrote folksongs.

- Karl Ludwig Gümbel (b. 1842; d. 1911 in Berlin)

A professor of theology, he studied Evangelical theology in Heidelberg and Tübingen, was a vicar in Lemberg near Pirmasens and in Kaiserslautern, and a pastor in Sankt Julian. As a teacher of religion at the Gymnasium in Speyer, he was named a church councillor and a professor of theology. Because of his efforts to build a memorial church in Speyer, he was dubbed the “Father of the Memorial Church”. In 1904, he was awarded an honorary doctorate by Heidelberg University.

- Christian Julius Dick (b. 1873; d. 1950 in Neustadt an der Weinstraße)

A chartered engineer and botanist, Dick studied higher geodesy at the Ludwig-Maximilians-Universität München, worked in many areas of Bavaria as a chartered engineer and was lastly a chartered engineer at the Flurbereinigung office in Neustadt an der Weinstraße. As a member of the Bavarian Botanical Society and later of the Pollichia (a conservation society), he busied himself with studying desmids, which he drew with great exactitude. From the field of his research, he published two books that were greatly esteemed by other researchers: Desmidiaceenflora in Südbayern and Pfälzische Desmidiaceenflora.

- Ludwig Ehrenspeck (b. 1874; d. 1958 in Munich)

A jurist and politician, Ehrenspeck was mayor (Bürgermeister) in Frankenthal (1906–1921) and chief mayor (Oberbürgermeister) in Landau (1921–1935). In 1924, because of his opposition to the Rhenish Separatists, he was removed and received honorary citizenship in the town of Landau.

- Ludwig Roebel (b. 1878; d. 1934 in Mannheim)

An engineer and inventor of the Roebel bar, Roebel studied electrical engineering at the Technische Hochschule München and worked at the experimental department of Brown, Bovery und Cie. in Mannheim. Here, under his leadership, the Roebel bar, an electrical conductor for electrical machines made up of two or more groups of component leads, was invented.

- Paul Bauer (b. 1896; d. 1990 in Munich)

A notary, mountaineer, writer and Maria Bauer’s brother (see below), Bauer was among the best known mountaineers in the time between the two world wars. Prominent were his two attempts at climbing Kangchenjunga (elevation: 8 586 m above sea level; the world’s third highest peak) in 1929 and 1932. His theoretical discussions on the problems of Himalayan expeditions form a basis for modern mountaineering in high ranges that recommend forgoing large expeditions and instead putting individual effort in the fore. At the 1932 Summer Olympics in Los Angeles, Bauer received a gold medal for the books about mountains that he had published.

- Johann Adam Fritz (b. 1896; d. 1981 in Seeshaupt)

A painter, Fritz studied at the Academy of Fine Arts, Munich, later undertaking many trips abroad and clung fast to his exotic-looking pictures. He was also a landscape painter and a portraitist, painting many well known personages of his time, becoming known as the “Painter of Cardinals and Maharajas”.

- Dr. Maria Bauer (b. 1898; d. 1995 in Kusel)

An educator and writer, Dr. Bauer was originally a primary school teacher, but also studied German studies and philosophy and taught at the Aufbauschule in Speyer, undertook many trips and dedicated herself to caring for war graves throughout Europe. In presentations she reported about her work and her life, as she also did in her autobiographical books: Sieben Farben hat der Regenbogen (“Seven Colours Has the Rainbow”, 1966), Unterwegs (“On the Way”, 1976) and Späte Wanderungen (“Late Migrations”, 1986).

- Richard Imbt (b. 1900; d. 1987 in Munich)

An NSDAP politician, Imbt became the Party Ortsgruppenleiter in Zweibrücken in 1925. In 1932 and 1933, he was a Member of the Bavarian Landtag. He became mayor of Bad Dürkheim on 1 May 1933, later becoming chief mayor in Neustadt an der Weinstraße and the same in Kaiserslautern by 1940. Two years earlier, he had had Kaiserslautern’s synagogue torn down. Towards the end of the Second World War, Imbt fled to Bavaria, but on 17 May 1945 returned to Kaiserslautern only to get himself arrested and then interned in Idar-Oberstein. He was released from prison on 16 April 1949. As part of the Denazification process, Imbt was declared “contaminated” and was thus sent into retirement with a half pension.

- Fritz Benedum (b. 1902; d. 1965 in Kusel)

A KPD politician, Benedum joined the Independent Social Democratic Party of Germany (USPD) during the First World War, later switching to the Communist Party of Germany (KPD). In 1932 and 1933, he was a Member of the Reichstag. Since 1929, he had also been on Kusel town council. After Adolf Hitler’s seizure of power, he was reelected to the Reichstag on 5 March 1933, but like all Communist members, he could not fulfil his mandate once the Nazis had banned their party. Shortly thereafter, Benedum was held for more than a month in “protective custody”. In September 1939, he was arrested again and sent to Buchenwald concentration camp until January the following year. Between 1942 and 1945, he was in the Wehrmacht. After the war, Benedum held several political offices in West Germany, including one on Kusel town council once again, and eventually switched his party allegiance to the Titoist Independent Workers' Party of Germany (UAPD).

- Otto Niebergall (b. 1904; d. 1977 in Mainz)

A KPD politician and Member of the Bundestag, after the First World War, Niebergall went to the Saar, which at that time had been split away from Germany, was chairman of the Deutscher Metallarbeiter-Verband (German Metalworkers’ Association) and a functionary in the Kommunistischer Jugendverband Deutschlands (Communist Youth Association of Germany), as of 1925 the Gau leader of the Rotfrontkämpferbund and at the same time a city councillor in Saarbrücken. After the Saar was returned to Germany, Niebergall emigrated to France and became section leader of the illegal “KPD Saar-Pfalz” in Forbach. In 1936, he was temporarily a special appointee of the Communist Party in Spain. After German troops marched into France, Niebergall was interned by the Vichy régime in Saint Cyprien. He fled underground, taking on once more his multifaceted functions, became a member of the Resistance and carried out propaganda activities under German occupation. He also joined the movement Freies Deutschland West, becoming its president in 1944. After the war, he at first returned to the Saarland, whereupon he was expelled by the French. After that, he lived in Mainz, was KPD chairman in the French zone of occupation and Member of the Bundestag from 1949 to 1953. Even after the KPD was banned in 1958, Niebergall was still engaged with Communist organizations, in particular the German Communist Party (DKP).

- Hans Keller (b. 1920; d. 1992 in Neustadt an der Weinstraße)

A Government President, Keller studied legal and state sciences in Heidelberg and Mainz, first took a post as a jurist in administrative service and in 1966 became Government President of the Palatinate. Keller was an honorary citizen of his hometown and was also buried in Kusel.

- Fritz Wunderlich (b. 1930 in Kusel; d. 1966 in Heidelberg)

A concert and opera singer (tenor), Wunderlich studied at the music college (Musikhochschule) in Freiburg im Breisgau, embarked together with his music teacher and pianist Hubert Gießen tours through Germany, became an opera singer at the operas of Stuttgart and Munich, received many invitations for guest rôles and opera houses throughout the world were always open to him. He was unique as an interpreter of Mozart's work, at which he presented the arias of the operas with his full voice in glorious bel canto. At the age of just under 36, Wunderlich suffered an unfortunate fall at a friend’s house in Oberderdingen near Maulbronn, and subsequently died in Heidelberg.

- Axel A. Weber (born 1957)

Deutsche Bundesbank President from 2004 to 2011

- Hans Werner Moser (1965)

Footballer

- Martin Haller (born 1983)

Politician (SPD)

=== Notable people associated with the town ===
- Ludwig Louis Benzino (b. 1827; d. 1895)

Politician, lived and died in Kusel.

- Herman Wirth (b. 1885 in Utrecht, Netherlands; d. 1981 in Kusel)

Cofounder of the Ahnenerbe

- Wilhelm Caroli (b. 1895 in Saarlouis; d. 1942 in Dachau)

Catholic priest, Nazi victim, died at Dachau, in 1925/1926 chaplain in Kusel.

- Wolfgang Kermer (b. 1935 in Neunkirchen)

Professor emeritus of art history, former Rector of the Staatliche Akademie der Bildenden Künste Stuttgart (State Academy of Fine Arts Stuttgart).

- Hartwig Bartz (b. 1936 in Rammelsbach; d. 2001)

German modern jazz drummer

- Miroslav Klose (b. 1978 in Opole, Poland)

German footballer, lived in Kusel from the age of eight.
