= Saar Offensive =

French military operation during World War II

Coordinates: 49°10′N 7°15′E

- Part of the Phoney War of World War II
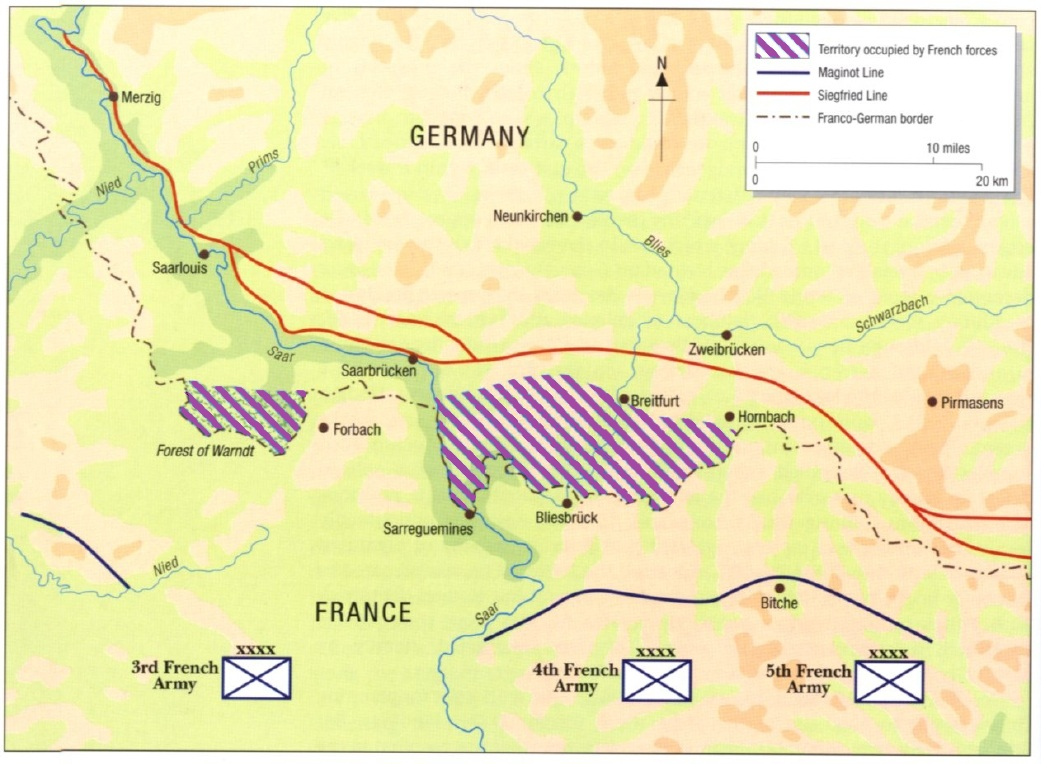
- Disposition of French forces
Date	7 September – 16 October 1939 (1 month and 9 days)
Location	Saarland, Germany
Result	German victory; French tactical withdrawal; Beginning of the Phoney War

Belligerents
France	Germany

Commanders and leaders
(French Third Republic) Maurice Gamelin (French Third Republic) A.G. Prétalat	(Nazi Germany) Erwin von Witzleben

Units involved
Second Army Group (Parts)	1st Army

Strength
10 divisions	Unknown

Casualties and losses
2,000 casualties 4 tanks destroyed	552 casualties 114 missing 11 aircraft destroyed

The Saar Offensive was the French invasion of Saarland, Germany, in the first stages of World War II, from September 7 to October 16, 1939, in response to the German invasion of Poland on 1 September 1939. The original plans called for 40 divisions, one armored division, three mechanised divisions, 78 artillery regiments and 40 tank battalions to assist Poland, which was then under invasion, by attacking Germany's neglected western front. Despite 30 divisions advancing to the border (and in some cases across it), the attack did not have the expected result. When the swift victory in Poland allowed Germany to reinforce its lines with troops from the east, the offensive was halted. French forces then withdrew amid a German counter-offensive on 17 October.

== Background ==
In 1921, France and Poland made a defensive alliance against Germany through the military convention. France, along with the United Kingdom, declared war on Germany on September 3rd, 1939, two days after the German invasion of Poland.

== Objective of the offensive ==
According to the convention, the French Army was to start preparations for the major offensive three days after mobilisation started. The French forces were to effectively gain control over the area between the French border and the Siegfried Line and were to probe the German defences. The sector was defended by the German 1st Army. On the 15th day of the mobilisation (that is on 16 September), the French Army was to start a full-scale assault on Germany. The pre-emptive mobilisation was started in France on 26 August and on 1 September, full mobilisation was declared.

French mobilisation suffered from an inherently out-of-date system, which greatly affected their ability to swiftly deploy their forces on the field. The French command still believed in the tactics of World War I, which relied heavily on stationary artillery, even though this took time to transport and deploy. Many pieces also had to be retrieved from storage before any advance could be made.

== French operations ==
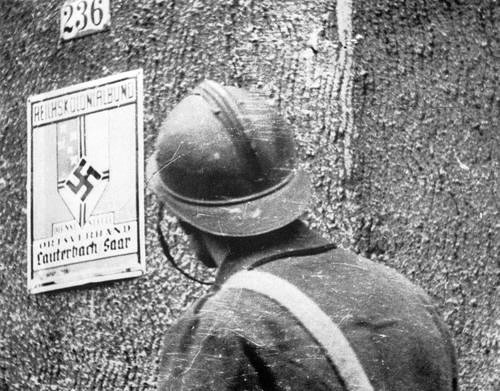
A French soldier outside of a Reichskolonialbund office in Lauterbach

Almost everyone expected a major French attack on the Western Front soon after the start of the war, but Britain and France were cautious as both feared large German air attacks on their cities; they did not know that 90 percent of German frontline aircraft were in Poland nor did they realise that the few German units that were holding the line had effectively been "pared to the bone" and stripped of any real fighting capability leaving the French unknowingly with a 3:1 advantage over the Germans. Consequently what followed was what historian Roger Moorhouse called a "sham offensive on the Saar" that began on 7 September, four days after France declared war on Germany. The Wehrmacht was engaged in the attack on Poland and the French enjoyed a decisive numerical advantage along the border with Germany but the French did not take any action that was able to assist the Poles. Eleven French divisions, part of the Second Army Group, advanced along a 32-kilometre (20 mi) near Saarbrücken, against weak German opposition. The French army advanced to as far as 8 km (5 mi) in some areas, and captured about 12 towns and villages with no resistance: Gersheim, Medelsheim, Ihn, Niedergailbach, Bliesmengen, Ludweiler, Brenschelbach, Lauterbach, Niedaltdorf, Kleinblittersdorf, Auersmacher, and Sitterswald (occasionally called "Hitlersdorf" in some French reports). Four Renault R35 tanks were destroyed by mines north of Bliesbrück.

By 9 September, the French occupied most of the Warndt Forest. On 10 September, while a minor German counterattack retook the village of Apach, French forces reversed the loss only hours later. The French 32nd Infantry Regiment made further gains on 12 September, seizing the German town of Brenschelbach with the loss of one captain, one sergeant, and seven privates. Near the meeting point of the French, German, and Luxembourgeois borders, the Schengen bridge was destroyed.

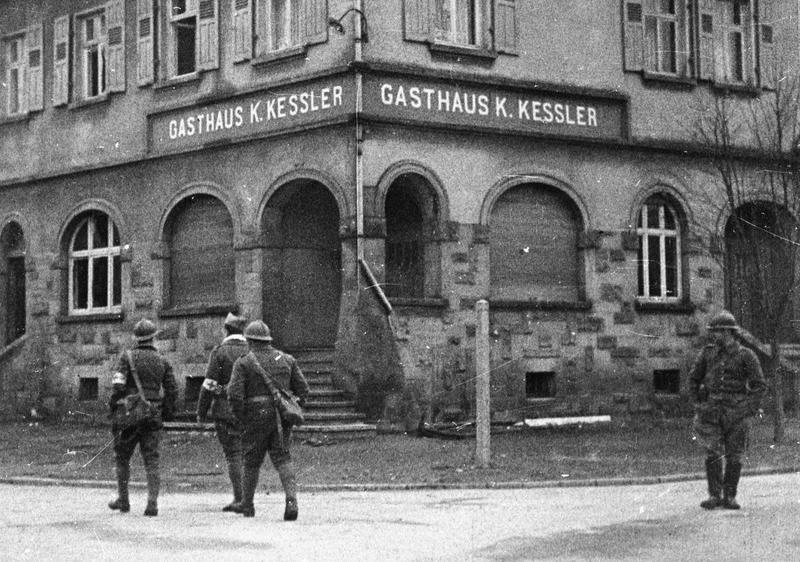
French soldiers in Lauterbach

The offensive was halted after French forces had taken the 7-square-kilometre (2.7 mi^{2}) Warndt Forest, which had been heavily mined by the Germans. The French stopped short of the Siegfried line, although they came within a few kilometres south of it, immediately east of Saarbrücken.

The French held German territory along all of the Rhine-Moselle front, but after the collapse of Poland, General Maurice Gamelin on 21 September ordered French units to return to their starting positions on the Maginot Line. Some French generals, such as Henri Giraud, saw the withdrawal as a wasted opportunity and made known their disagreement with it.

As the withdrawal was taking place, on 28 September a counterattack by the German 18th Infantry Regiment (from the then newly formed 52nd Division) in the area between Bischmisheim and Ommersheim was repelled by French forces.

On 17 October, the withdrawal was complete. There had been about 2,000 French casualties (killed, wounded, or sick).

== Aftermath ==
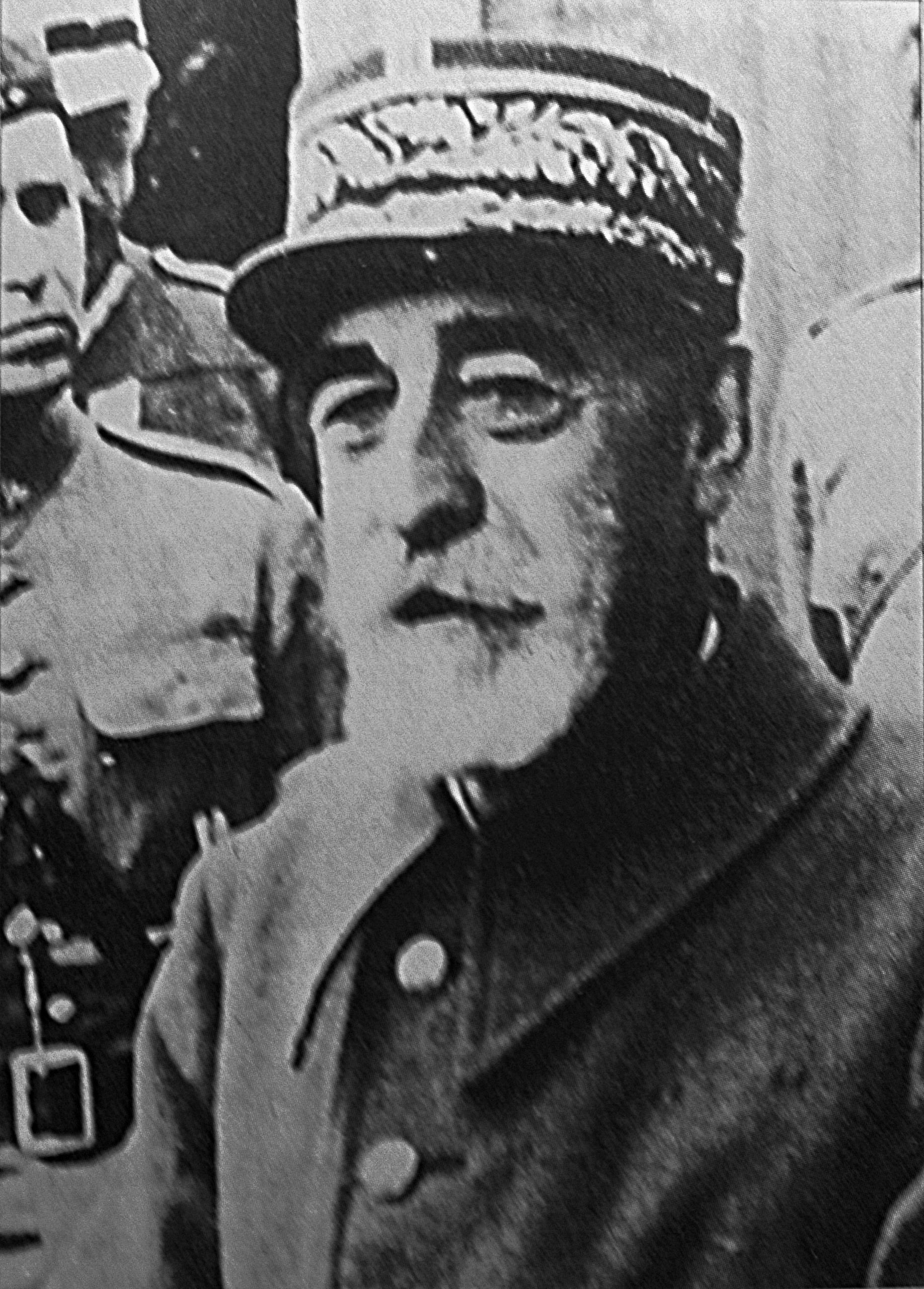
Louis Faury, head of the French Military Mission to Poland.

The Polish Army general plan for defence, Plan West, assumed that the Allied offensive on the Western Front would provide significant relief on the Polish Front.

However, the limited and half-hearted Saar Offensive did not result in any diversion of German troops. The 40-division all-out assault never materialised. On 12 September, the Anglo-French Supreme War Council gathered for the first time at Abbeville in France. It was decided that all offensive actions were to be halted immediately. General Maurice Gamelin ordered his troops to stop "not closer than 1 kilometre (0.6 miles)" from the German positions along the Siegfried Line. Poland was not notified of this decision. Instead, Gamelin incorrectly informed Marshal Edward Rydz-Śmigły that half of his divisions were in contact with the enemy, and that French advances had forced the Wehrmacht to withdraw at least six divisions from Poland.

The following day, the commander of the French Military Mission to Poland, General Louis Faury, informed the Polish chief of staff, General Wacław Stachiewicz, that the planned major offensive on the western front had to be postponed from 17 to 20 September.

From 16 to 17 October, the German army, now reinforced with troops returning from the Polish campaign, conducted a counteroffensive that retook the remainder of the lost territory, still held by French covering forces, which withdrew as planned. German reports acknowledged the loss of 196 soldiers, plus 114 missing and 356 wounded. They also claimed that, as of 17 October, eleven of their aircraft had been shot down. The French suffered around 2,000 casualties in the Saar Offensive. By then, all French divisions had been ordered to retreat to their barracks along the Maginot Line. The Phoney War had begun.

At the Nuremberg Trials, German military commander Alfred Jodl said that "if we did not collapse already in the year 1939 that was due only to the fact that during the Polish campaign, the approximately 110 French and British divisions in the West were held completely inactive against the 23 German divisions." General Siegfried Westphal stated that if the French had attacked in full force in September 1939 the German army "could only have held out for one or two weeks."

== See also ==
- List of French military equipment of World War II
- List of German military equipment of World War II

== Sources ==
- Jackson, Julian (2004). The Fall of France: The Nazi Invasion of 1940. OUP Oxford. ISBN 978-0192805508.
- Jordan, Nicole (2002). The Popular Front and Central Europe: The Dilemmas of French Impotence 1918-1940. Cambridge, Great Britain: Cambridge University Press. ISBN 0521522420.
- Liddell Hart, B. H. (1970). History of the Second World War. New York: Putnam. OCLC 878163245.
- Moorhouse, Roger (2019). First to Fight. London: The Bodley Head. ISBN 978-1-84792-460-5.
- Kuffmann, J. E.; Kaufmann, H. W. (2002). Hitler's Blitzkrieg Campaigns: The Invasion And Defense Of Western Europe, 1939–1940. Boston, MA: Da Capo Press. ISBN 0306812169.
- Snyder, Louis L. (1960). The War: A Concise History 1939–1945. New York: Julian Messner. OCLC 964796.
