= Jakob Weis =

German army chaplain (1879–1948)

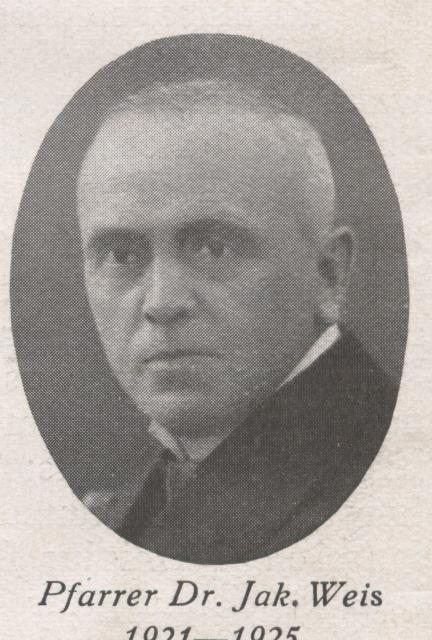
Pastor Dr. Jakob Weis, 1930

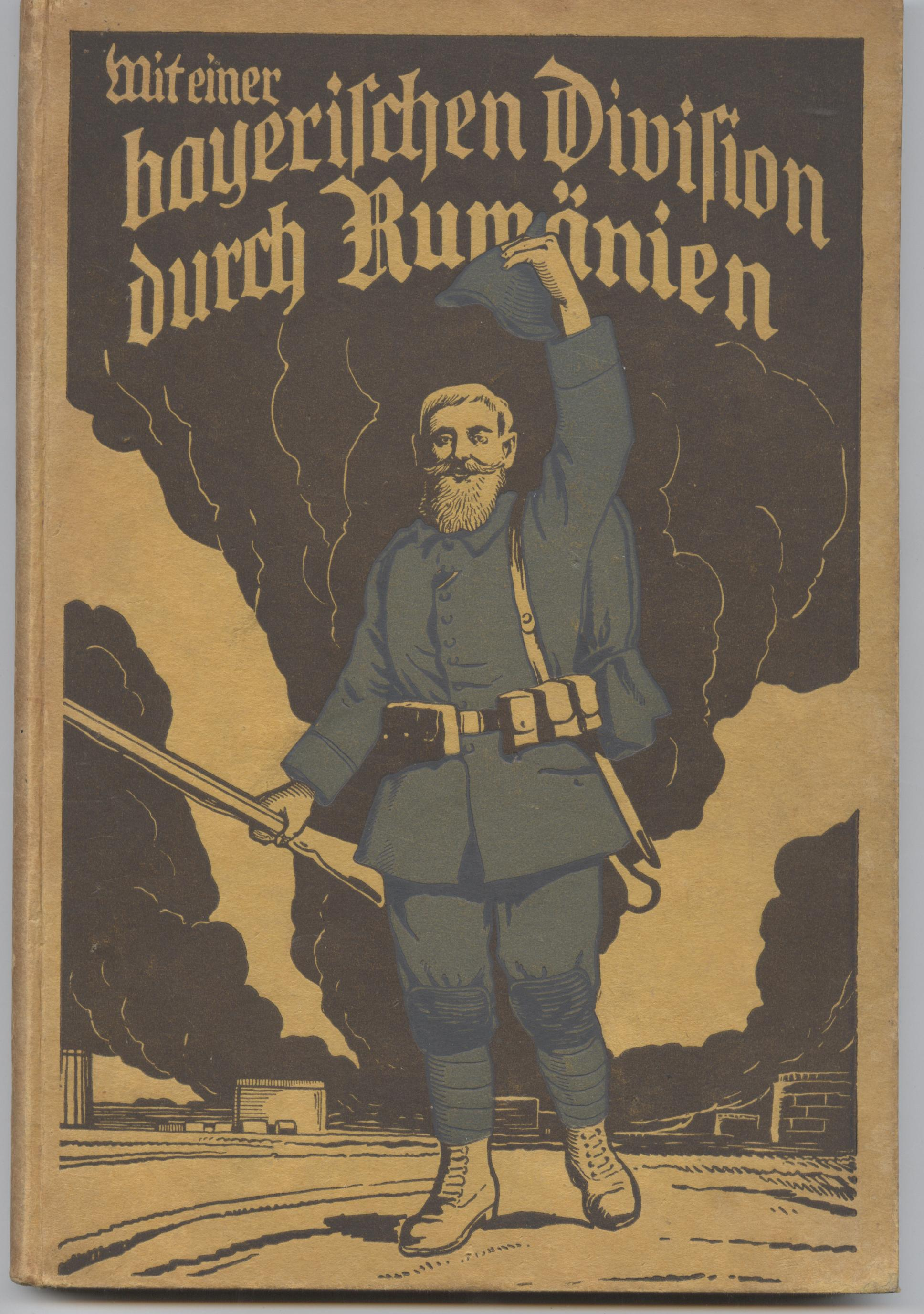
Cover of Weis's memoirs (1917)

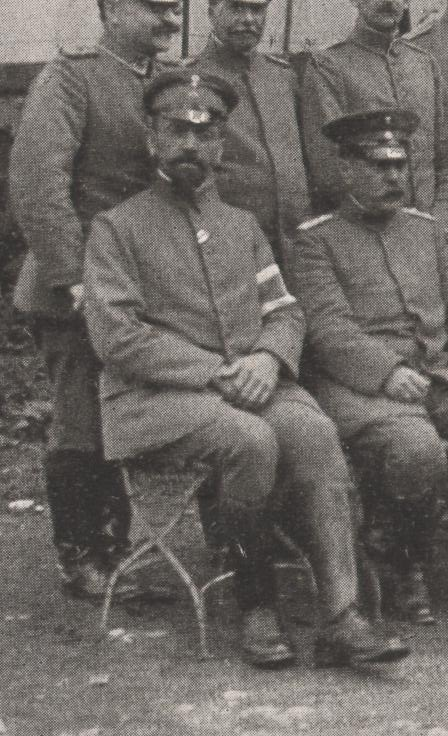
Jakob Weis as a divisional pastor in Romania, 1917

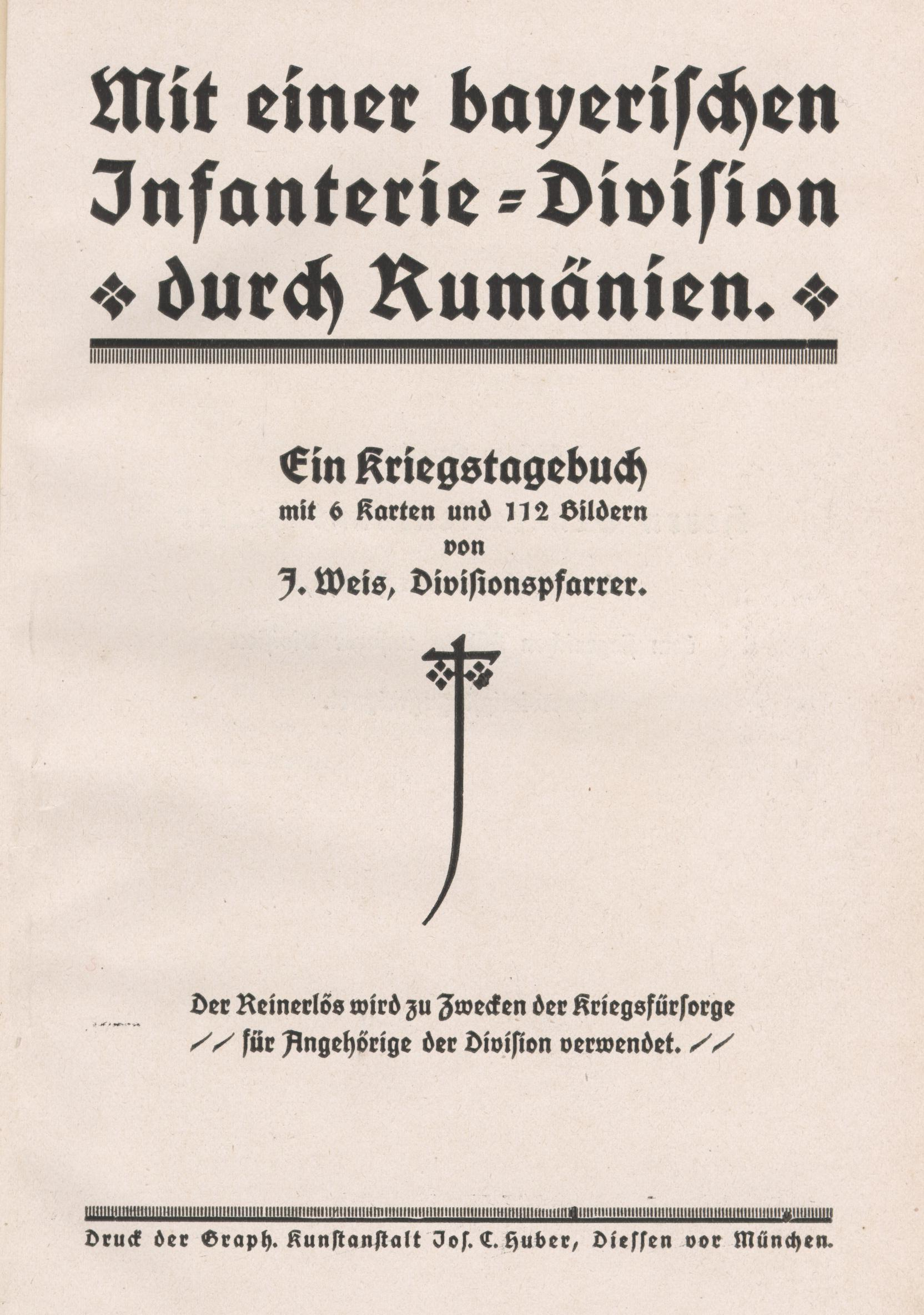
Title page of Weis's expanded version of his memoirs, stating that the proceeds will go to charity.

Jakob Weis (13 May 1879, Ommersheim, Saarpfalz – 18 March 1948, Zweibrücken) was a priest in the Diocese of Speyer, who also worked as a prison chaplain. During the First World War he became the army chaplain to the 12th Bavarian Infantry Division and Catholic pastoral care advisor to the Armee-Oberkommando Mackensen. From 1918 to 1920 he voluntarily joined soldiers in their internment so as to continue his pastoral care.

== Life ==
Weis was ordained priest in Speyer Cathedral on 4 October 1901. He then spent time as a chaplain in Mittelbexbach (10 October 1901 – 30 August 1905), then time in Gersheim (31 August 1905 – 16 October 1905), then in Landau in der Pfalz (17 October 1905 – 30 June 1909). From 1 July 1909 to 27 February 1921 he served as chaplain to Zweibrücken prison, an extremely difficult and thankless pastoral post. From 4 August 1914 Weis was also pastor to a field hospital, then pastor to 12th Bavarian Infantry Division (known as "the Iron Division" for its bravery and toughness). He published his memoirs of his time with 12th Division in 1917 as Mit einer bayerischen Division durch Rumänien (With a Bavarian Division through Romania), along with his postcards from the front, with the proceeds from both works given to soldiers' charities.

He was also promoted to Catholic chaplain of August von Mackensen's whole force. At the end of the war he voluntarily went into captivity in Romania with Mackensen's army so as to continue providing its pastoral care, gaining the respect of both the prisoners and their captors. He was elected the troops' delegate to the German Red Cross and was active in alleviating the mental and physical hardship of captivity. He left in summer 1920 with the last German prisoners to leave Romania.

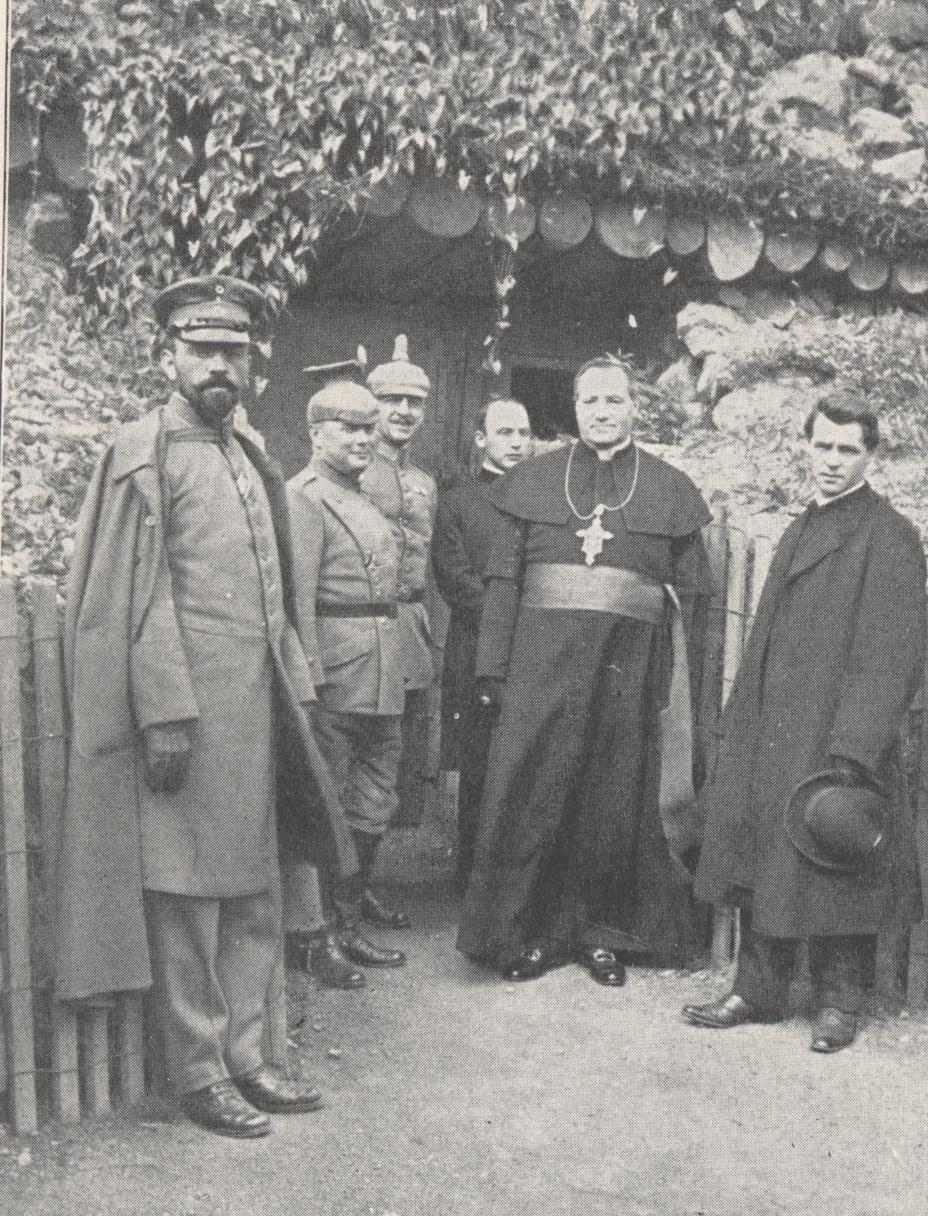
Jakob Weis (left), as a Divisional Pastor on the western front, 1916. In the middle is Kardinal Franziskus von Bettinger, with secretary Konrad von Preysing to the left

On his return from the war he continued as a prison chaplain. On 1 March 1921 Weis became city-pastor of Pirmasens, where he was a strong supporter of the construction of a second church building for the parish. Associations already existed for that purpose, but these were inactive and so he galvanized them. From 1 April 1925 Weis worked as a professor at the Oberrealschule, later at the Zweibrücken Gymnasium, as well as engaging strongly in the construction of a daughter-church for Utweiler. In 1940 Jakob Weis retired to the Ruhestand and lived in Zweibrücken, though continuing his pastoral work despite his worsening health. He died in Zweibrücken on 18 March 1948 and was buried there.

His obituary in the Speyer diocesan newsletter Der Pilger (Nr. 15/16, of 11 April 1948) stated:

He was a witty man, with characteristic features, of a true priestly spirit, known for his great deeds in many fields. His social drive, in persuading him to go into prison chaplaincy, was also seen in his pastoral care and industrial chaplaincy in Pirmasen. To his pupils in Zweibrücken he was not only a teacher, but also an advisor and a helper. As a preacher and writer he worked far beyond his field of work.

== Awards ==
He received the Iron Cross First Class for his personal bravery, along with the Iron Cross Second Class, the Military Merit Order Fourth Class with swords, the Red Cross Medal Third Class and the Honour Cross of the World War 1914/1918 for non-combatants.

== Family ==
Jakob Weis was the great-uncle of the former vicar general and current Speyer diocesan official Domkapitular, Prälat Dr. Norbert Weis. They are both from the same family as bishop of Speyer Nikolaus von Weis.

== Bibliography ==
- (in German) Nachruf in Pilger, Speyer, Nr. 15/16, vom 11. April 1948
- (in German) Jakob Weis: Mit einer Bayerischen Division durch Rumänien. Huber, Diessen bei München, 1917
- (in German) Ludwig Börst: Die Pfälzer Theologen im Weltkrieg 1914-18. Pilger, Speyer (ohne Jahr, ca. 1930), Seite 27
- (in German) Balthasar Meier: Der Bayerische katholische Klerus im Felde 1914-18. Brönner & Däntler, Eichstätt 1937, Seite 82
- (in German) Schematismus des Bistums Speyer, 1934. Pilger, Speyer 1934, Seite 329
- (in German) Michael Faulhaber (Hrsg.): „Das Schwert des Geistes“ (Feldpredigten im Weltkrieg). Herder, Freiburg, 1917 (enthält auf Seiten 443-446 zwei Ansprachen von Divisionspfarrer Jakob Weis, mit den Titeln „Glauben und Leben“ bzw. „Crux suprema lex“, gehalten anlässlich von Frontbegräbnissen).
- (in German) Festschrift zur Weihe der Pfarrkirche St. Anton, Pirmasens. Eigenverlag des Pfarramtes, Pirmasens 1931
