= Abbeville Conference =

1939 meeting of the Franco–British Supreme War Council

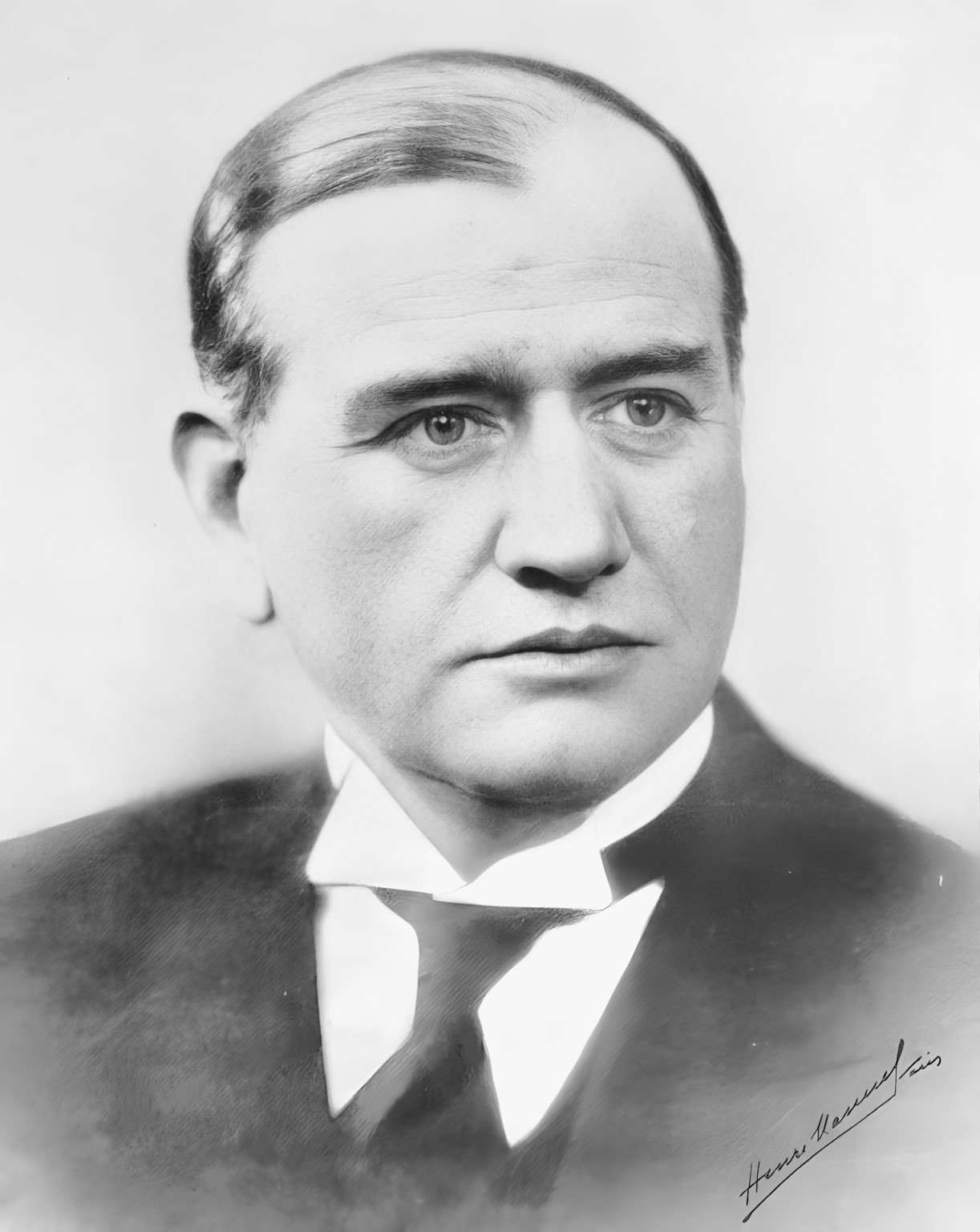
Prime Minister Édouard Daladier (France)

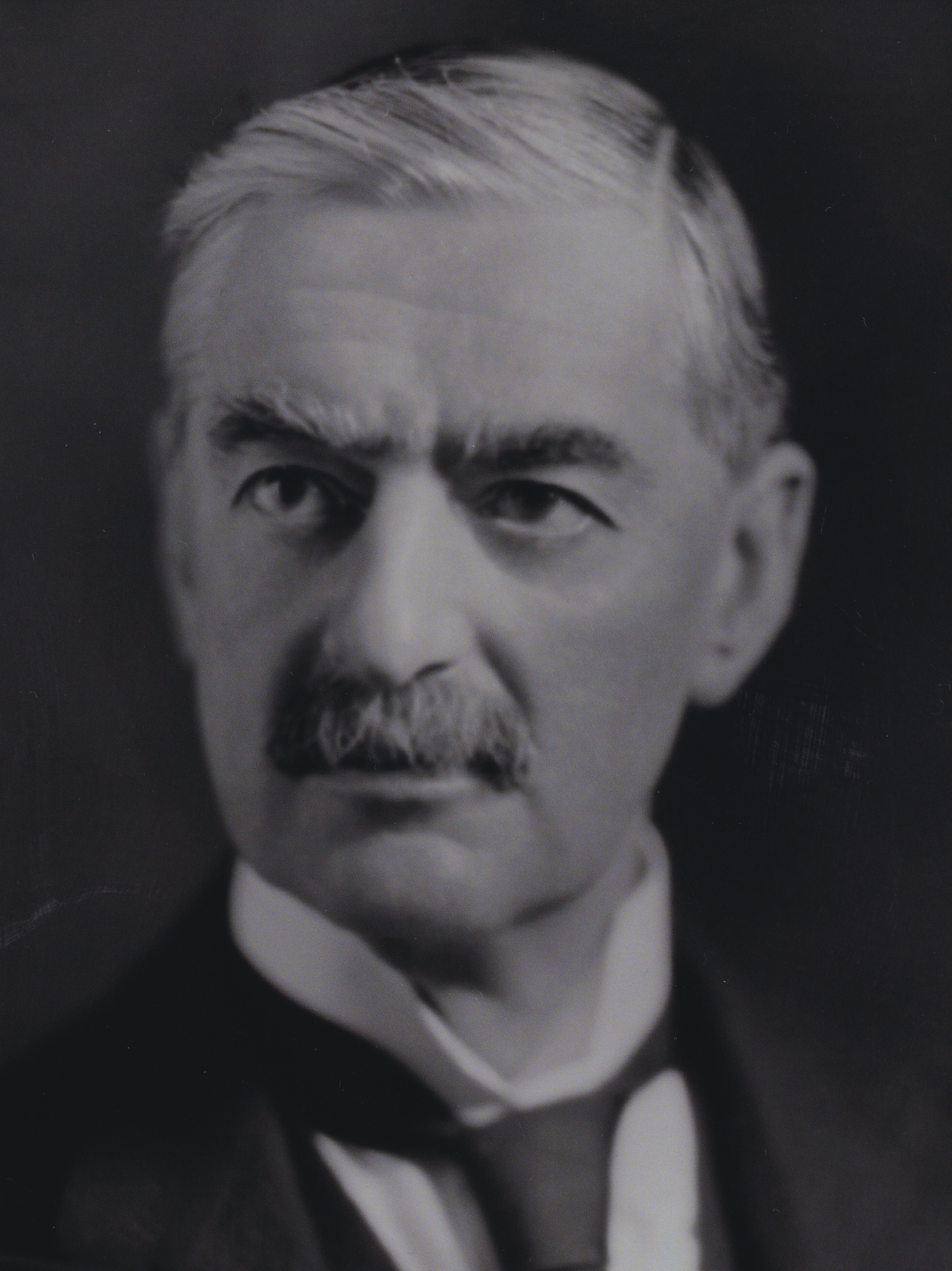
Prime Minister Neville Chamberlain (United Kingdom)

The Abbeville Conference was the first meeting of the Franco–British Supreme War Council. It took place on 12 September 1939 in Abbeville, northern France. The meeting was attended by the prime ministers of both states — Édouard Daladier and Neville Chamberlain. The main subject of discussion was the scale of military assistance to Poland, which was fighting against the German invasion.

The primary conclusion of the meeting was the approval of the French Commander-in-Chief, General Maurice Gamelin’s decision to halt the Saar Offensive; to continue the deliveries of materiel to Poland that had already been initiated after the outbreak of war; and to prepare for defensive operations in France in view of the imminent German offensive in the west expected by Gamelin – an offensive that did not begin until 10 May 1940.

The conference was the first meeting of the Supreme War Council and expressed the determination of France and the United Kingdom to continue the war until Nazi Germany was defeated. Moreover, three days after the conference, the French Commander-in-Chief once again approved limited offensive actions against Germany. Their scale, however, remained modest, and they were discontinued shortly thereafter.

== Background ==
=== Allied obligations to Poland ===
After the German attack on Poland at dawn on 1 September 1939, her allies — France and the United Kingdom — entered the war on 3 September, being in a state of war with the Third German Reich from 11:00 a.m. (United Kingdom) and 5:00 p.m. (France). The British side immediately began preparing an air attack on the German naval base in Wilhelmshaven, which was carried out in the afternoon of 4 September. The small effects of the raid and the heavy losses incurred caused further similar actions to be suspended for several subsequent weeks. In any case, the operation could not have helped the Poles. In Britain, it was assessed that none of the existing RAF operational plans could significantly help the Polish Army.

A project considered in spring and summer 1939 to transfer several British bomber squadrons to Polish territory after the outbreak of war was ultimately abandoned already in August — after it was concluded that, due to organisational and logistical problems, operations by these units could not bring meaningful benefits.

A British Military Mission was sent to Poland just before the outbreak of war. On 4 September, Romania granted permission for transport of arms across its territory to embattled Poland; on 5 September, the same was done by the Kingdom of Yugoslavia and subsequently by the Kingdom of Greece (1935–1941). Ships carrying aircraft previously ordered by Poland set out from England via the Mediterranean to the port of Constanța, while in Marseille loading continued of tanks, cars, artillery and ammunition that Poland had also ordered earlier.

On land, the French Army was to undertake actions on behalf of Poland under the arrangements adopted on 19 May 1939 in the final protocol of the Franco–Polish military talks. France was to begin, around the third day after the start date of French mobilisation (mobilisation having been announced on 1 September, with the start date designated as 2 September), limited-objective offensive actions; and subsequently, from the fifteenth day after mobilisation began, offensive operations “with the main forces.” In French military terminology of the time, this latter term referred merely to a detached portion of the whole — of unspecified composition and size.

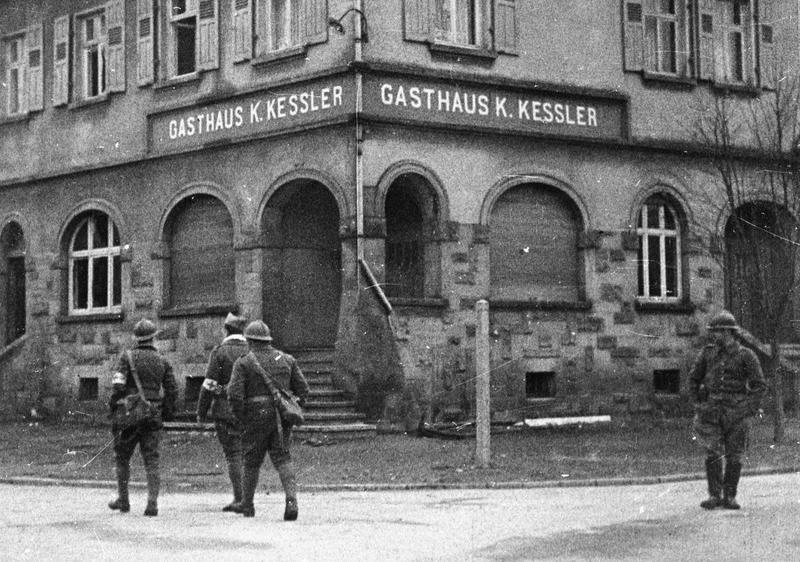
French soldiers south of Saarbrücken

The operational principles were set out in the instruction of the French Chief of the General Staff for National Defence, General Maurice Gamelin, dated 31 May 1939, and the instructions of the commander of the 2nd Army Group, General André-Gaston Prételat (22 July), and of the commander of the North-Eastern Theatre of Operations, General Alphonse Georges (24 July). They envisaged, in the first phase, making contact with the German fortified position (the Westwall — the Siegfried Line) between the Hochwald Forest and the western edge of the Vosges, and a “strictly limited” action against advanced elements of that position; and subsequently, in the area east of Saarbrücken, the possibility (treated only as an option) of attempting an attack against German fortifications on a broader front. These plans were unknown to the Polish and British allies.

Immediately after the outbreak of the war, General Gamelin resisted the pressure of Prime Minister Édouard Daladier to undertake immediate action to reduce German pressure on Poland, explaining to the British allies on 4 September that he did not intend to waste his resources merely to create the appearance of doing something. He had already presented a plan for a methodical and orderly operation supported by powerful artillery, leading to a reconnaissance-in-force against the Siegfried Line, with an assault planned for a designated day.

On 3 September he proposed employing British aircraft stationed in France as part of the Advanced Air Striking Force (AASF) in attacks on German infrastructure. The proposal was received with reserve due to doubts about its effectiveness, as well as the risk to civilian populations — an issue highlighted on 1 September by U.S. President Franklin D. Roosevelt.

The British side ultimately decided that the AASF should be preserved until it could have a decisive effect on the course of the war — for example, against a concentration of German reinforcements brought to the Siegfried Line. This cautious approach was criticised by the then First Lord of the Admiralty Winston Churchill, who demanded more intensive action to relieve Poland.

=== The French "offensive for Poland" ===
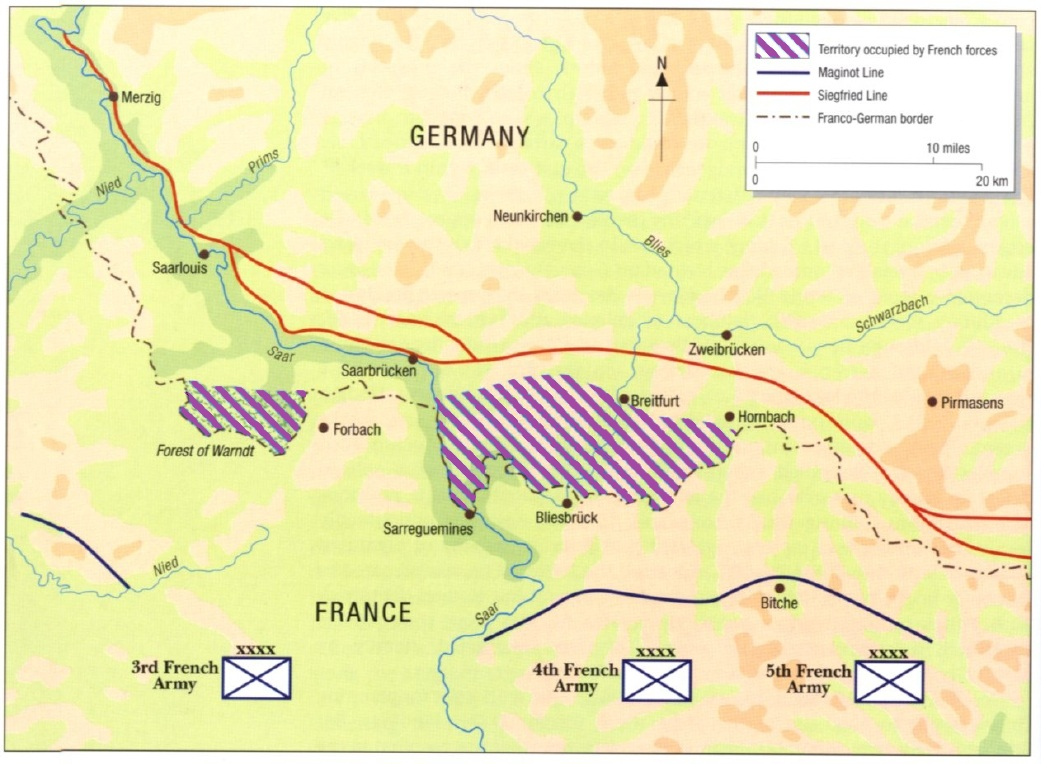
German territory occupied by the French Army by 12 September 1939 during the so-called Saar Offensive

The first, very small-scale actions on German territory were undertaken by French units during the night of 5–6 September 1939. The so-called “offensive for Poland” began at dawn on 9 September.

Formally, the operation was conducted by three armies (3rd, 4th, and 5th) of the 2nd Army Group, but in practice five divisions of the 4th Army took part, because the remaining forces were still concentrating and were able to act only with part of the resources then available. French actions were carried out in accordance with doctrine and the orders received — slowly and methodically. The goal declared by General Gamelin was to draw toward them the maximum possible number of German forces.

In London, however, these actions raised concern that France might prematurely launch a larger-scale operation at a time when British forces were not yet prepared for such action. British strategy was instead to prepare for a long war (according to Chamberlain's expectations — a three-year one), relying on naval blockade and the buildup of air superiority.

These concerns were heightened by the pressure exerted by the French Prime Minister, Édouard Daladier, who — faced with unexpectedly rapid German advances in the East— sought to induce the British ally to undertake more serious measures on behalf of Poland. His emphasis was primarily on deliveries of military equipment, but also, if possible, air operations.

French air forces had already been active since 4 September — though only in reconnaissance flights and fighter operations, without engaging their relatively weak and outdated bomber forces. The transfer to Poland of five French air squadrons, agreed upon during the May talks with the Polish side, ultimately did not take place — formally due to Poland's loss of the airfields intended for their arrival.

== Course of the conference ==
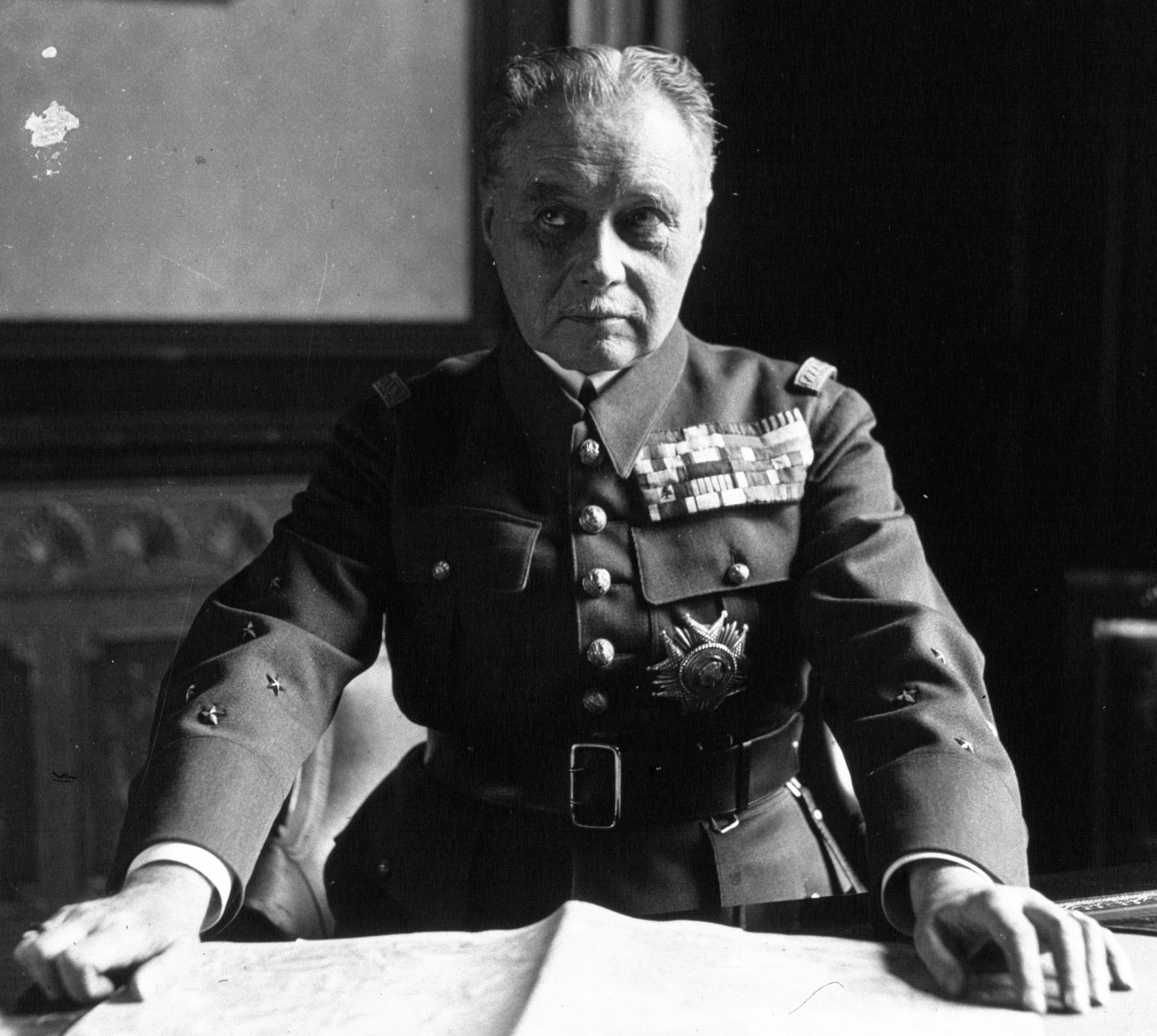
General Maurice Gamelin, Commander-in-Chief of the French Army

The need to convene a meeting of the Supreme War Council was raised by the British War Cabinet already on 4 September. The meeting was to establish Allied war policy for the coming months. France also recognised the need for such a meeting, though initially it considered holding a broader conference including representatives of Poland.

Ultimately, at British initiative, only a Franco–British meeting took place. Seeking clarification of the situation and concerned by signs that the French might be undertaking overly ambitious operations, British Prime Minister Neville Chamberlain proposed to the French on 11 September that the first meeting of the Council be held the next day, suggesting either Amiens or Abbeville in northern France as the location. The meeting was therefore convened on very short notice, without prior agreement even on an agenda. No Polish representatives were invited (in the view of historian Wojciech Mazur, more likely due to haste and the need for secrecy than out of any deliberate disregard for Poland).

The deliberations began shortly before noon on 12 September 1939. Their principal participants were Daladier, Chamberlain, the British Minister for the Coordination of Defence Lord Chatfield, and General Gamelin, who reported on military matters. Chamberlain, wishing to prevent discussion of any possible offensive, did not bring his own staff officers to France.

Polish affairs — one of the main reasons for the meeting — were addressed at the very start. Daladier confirmed British concerns by stating that the offensive launched on the Western Front was progressing favourably and might in time develop into larger-scale operations. This remark, however, was ignored by Chamberlain, who praised France's restraint, asserting that time was working in favour of the Allies and that premature action would be a mistake.

Realising France's dependence on British support, Daladier immediately withdrew from any “offensive” ambitions. The two prime ministers then approved Gamelin's statement that he did not intend to send his forces against the main German defensive line — and that he had already issued the necessary orders.

Gamelin's declaration effectively meant halting the “offensive for Poland,” which had been underway for only three days. Gamelin had always regarded it primarily as a demonstration of force or a political gesture meant to distract Germany. His decision not to continue the 9 September operation was shaped by the rapid German progress in Poland; he was convinced that the forces engaged there would soon be transferred westward for operations against France.

When Lord Chatfield asked whether he would revise his plans if Polish resistance lasted longer than expected, Gamelin said no — adding that such a scenario would simply give the Allies more time to prepare their own defence against a German attack.

Daladier's attempts to emphasise the importance of efforts to sustain the Polish front — even if only through deliveries of materiel — had little effect in the face of Chamberlain's categorical view that “the only real help for Poland is to win the war” through Allied victory. This did not, however, imply an end to arms shipments to Poland; in fact, most of them were dispatched after 12 September.

During the discussion, it was also agreed that because British industry was vulnerable to air attack, and until its air defences and material reserves were strengthened, more intensive air operations against Germany should be avoided. The Allies also wished to avoid civilian casualties resulting from bombing.

The participants then discussed actions Germany might take after completing operations on the Eastern Front; the threat posed by Italy and the potential for using Italy to benefit the Allies; the likely situation in the Balkans and prospects for opening another front there; Spain's stance; and naval operations, including a possible Baltic campaign. The deliberations were not lengthy: their official portion ended at 1:30 p.m.

In the French provisional version of the protocol, the conclusions were summarised in four points:

- the main goal of the joint struggle was defined as the overthrow of Hitler's regime;
- on the Western Front, the principle of proceeding without haste and conserving land and air forces was adopted;
- it was acknowledged that little could be done for Poland and that the fate of the war would be decided in the West;
- the Allies declared their intention to maintain Italian neutrality and support resistance to Germany in peripheral regions, particularly the Balkans.

These points did not appear in the final official protocol. The British-issued press communiqué emphasised instead the determination of both powers united in the struggle and their willingness to “give every possible assistance” to Poland.

The publication of a press communiqué immediately after the conference indicated that its occurrence had not been kept secret.

== Significance of the conference ==
According to Mazur, the significance of the Abbeville Conference for the development of events in the early phase of the Second World War is often overstated. In his view, the Abbeville meeting did not bring about any meaningful revision of the existing policy toward the Polish ally, which had lost the strategic role of forming the core of a future eastern front as a result of the German–Soviet pact of 23 August 1939. Before the war, France and Britain had assumed that preparing an attack on the Siegfried Line would require time, and that Polish resistance would matter only if Poland became part of a durable and strong eastern front including Romania and previously Czechoslovakia, with at least benevolent neutrality from the USSR — a scenario rendered obsolete after 23 August. The head of the Planning Directorate of the British Air Ministry, Group Captain John Slessor, already concluded at the time that the Allies could not hope to save Poland and that their goal must instead be to restore Poland's independence by defeating Germany in the long term.

The Supreme War Council did not possess decision-making authority; at least nominally, it functioned as a consultative forum — albeit at a very high level. Decisions gained binding force only when approved by the governments concerned.

The agreements reached at Abbeville were very quickly undermined by the French participants themselves. Gamelin, having issued orders to halt the “offensive for Poland,” corrected his position three days later, after protests from, among others, General Georges. In a new instruction he authorised French forces to move closer to the forward defences of the Siegfried Line and to conduct a trial bombardment of its fortifications — although there was no longer any question of an assault on the line itself.

Two weeks after the conference, he even proposed supplementing the text of the “Conclusions” summarising the meeting with a significant clause: “...large-scale operations will not be undertaken by the Allied armies on the Western Front in the initial phase of the conflict; except for those deemed essential for assistance to Poland.” This proposal was accepted by the British side.

Daladier later spoke bitterly of the British stance, criticising, among other things, the lack of RAF bombings of Germany in response to German bombing of Poland. According to Mazur, Daladier — opposed both by the British prime minister and by his own Commander-in-Chief — made only weak attempts to push for active measures on behalf of Poland and soon found himself unable to adjust his position. Mazur argued that Daladier was the only participant able to demonstrate genuine goodwill toward the Polish ally, but his “timid gestures” were too modest to have practical effect; and Daladier himself in practice preferred to continue moral and material support for Poland chiefly to gain time.

Leszek Moczulski assessed the stance of the Allied prime ministers as a “crisis of leadership,” an evaluation Mazur endorsed.

Polish government representatives were neither invited to the conference nor officially informed of its conclusions. Nevertheless, the Allies’ position soon became known in Poland. On 15 September, the head of the Polish Military Mission in London, General Mieczysław Norwid-Neugebauer, reported in a cipher telegram that “the British are determined to wage war until Hitler is completely crushed,” but “for the moment Poland has been left to her own resources, and we can count only on material assistance.”

According to Mazur, there is no basis for asserting (as some historians have done) that Joseph Stalin withheld his decision to attack Poland until the Abbeville meeting and acted only upon learning its results. In Abbeville, the Allies expressed their desire to help Poland and maintain the Polish front; and crucially, the declaration that no large-scale offensive would be undertaken had already been agreed upon at the meeting between Gamelin and British commanders on 4 September. General Louis Faury, appointed head of the French military mission to Poland, who arrived shortly before the war, later described his relevant conversation of 22 August 1939 with Generals Gamelin and Georges, i.e., before the signing of the Molotov–Ribbentrop Pact:

I then raise the issue that has been troubling me... If Poland becomes the object of aggression, only a French offensive will be able to force the Germans to loosen their crushing grip. When will this offensive begin? Silence. Then General Georges indicates that the French Army is not capable of undertaking an offensive and that no date can be set when it would be ready for large-scale action. Until then, only defensive or limited offensive actions can be considered. When I cannot hide my disappointment, General Gamelin simply adds a few words: “Poland must hold on.”

The Soviet aggression of 17 September 1939 ultimately removed any remaining chances of Polish resistance in the view of the Western Allies. Any Allied offensive in the West could have brought relief only on the scale of months — a fact recognised by at least some Polish staff officers. Moreover, the Western Allies were not yet prepared for large-scale offensive operations, nor were such operations a priority for them.

Chief of Staff to the Commander-in-Chief, General Wacław Stachiewicz, later recalled:

On 16 September the head of the French mission, General Faury, informed me that he had sent a report to his authorities stating that the situation on our front was improving and that if we were given a few days to carry out our orders, we would be able to hold out in eastern Lesser Poland and concentrate significant forces there, opening new possibilities of action. At the same time, however, he informed me that he had received notice that the start of the offensive in the West would be postponed by a few days (to the 20th day of mobilisation, that is, 21 September), as preparations were not yet complete

== Assessment ==
In Polish historiography, the prevailing view is that the decisions taken on 12 September 1939 constituted a breach of the obligations arising from the alliance treaties. One of the important causes of Poland's rapid defeat has been identified as the lack of proper assistance from the West — a view which, according to Mazur, often disregards the actual circumstances or treats them selectively. One consequence of this approach has been the creation of the “Abbeville betrayal” myth — perpetuated mainly by some Polish historians. (Note: General Edmund Ironside was thoroughly familiar with the French military plans and found no indication suggesting that the French command ever intended an early attack on the Siegfried Line. During his stay in Warsaw, he learned of the French commitments to Poland. He knew they would not be fulfilled. “The French are lying to the Poles, saying they intend to attack. Such a concept does not exist at all,” he noted in his diary. He did not, however, inform the Poles of this. Moreover, he himself had serious doubts about Britain's immediate readiness.) (Note: While it is true that the military protocols of May 19 were not to assume the character of an official military agreement until the political accord interpreting the alliance was signed, and this was not done until September 4, the Poles can be excused for assuming that the French General Staff would prepare the necessary plans for an offensive against Germany in the West. Unfortunately for the Poles, however, Gamelin made no plans to attack the Siegfried Line, which the Germans had not even completed. Had such an attack been prepared and launched, the French would have had a good chance of breaking through the thin German defenses and of occupying the Ruhr, the industrial heart of Germany...)

Thus, it is hard to avoid the impression that the French deliberately misled the Poles to believe they would launch an offensive against Germany — and then left them to fight alone. For example, according to Leszek Moczulski, the events can be best described as a medieval concept of feudal felony — betrayal of an ally on the field of battle. (Note: The lies in this matter, the false information, the failure to notify Poland until the end about the decisions to refrain from an air offensive and then a land offensive against Germany — cannot be explained by anything. This insincere, even deceitful attitude of the political and military authorities of France and Britain in September toward Poland, disregarding all obligations, can be described by only one sufficiently precise term: it was felonia — betrayal of an ally on the battlefield.)

See also: Juliusz Łukasiewicz, Dyplomata w Paryżu. 1936–1939. Wspomnienia i dokumenty Juliusza Łukasiewicza Ambasadora Rzeczypospolitej Polskiej. Expanded edition, ed. Wacław Jędrzejewicz and Henryk Bułhak, London 1989, Polish Cultural Foundation, ISBN 0-85065-169-7;

Edward Bernard Raczyński, W sojuszniczym Londynie. Dziennik ambasadora Edwarda Raczyńskiego 1939–1945, Warsaw 1990, Nowa;

Marek Kornat, Polska 1939 roku wobec paktu Ribbentrop–Mołotow... (PISM 2002), pp. 501–527; 531–654. According to Paweł Wieczorkiewicz, the Abbeville decision represented a violation of the obligations of the Franco–Polish military agreement (which bound the ally to begin an offensive on the fifteenth day after general mobilisation). The leaders of France and Britain were aware of the contents of the secret protocol of the Molotov–Ribbentrop Pact, but did not reveal it to the Polish authorities for fear of Poland's premature capitulation.

Mazur argues, however, that Polish authors generally stopped at fairly schematic critical assessments of the conference and seldom attempted deeper source-based justification. For example, Romuald Szeremietiew considers that by the mere fact of Britain and France declaring war on Germany, Poland achieved its strategic goal.

Marshal Alphonse Juin later called the Abbeville decision shameful and erroneous from a strategic perspective: the military risk of an Allied offensive was negligible (according to Wieczorkiewicz, 74 French divisions faced 44 German divisions — mostly second-line formations — while the Allies had a fourfold superiority in artillery, an eightyfold superiority in tanks, and dominance in the air), and the German Siegfried Line was incomplete. On the other hand, military historians have shown that French tanks, bombers, and artillery were largely outdated, as was French doctrine. Given the French doctrine of a “material war,” the geography of the Western Front favouring German defenders, and the strength of 44 German divisions, their modern air force, the Siegfried Line, and the major obstacle of the Rhine, France could not have launched a rapid or effective offensive in 1939. All these factors were more than sufficient to stop the French until German forces returned from Poland. In either case, most historians agree that after the Soviet invasion of Poland on 17 September, any Allied offensive became entirely pointless.

== See also ==
- List of Allied World War II conferences
