= Phoney War =

Initial period of low activity in World War II

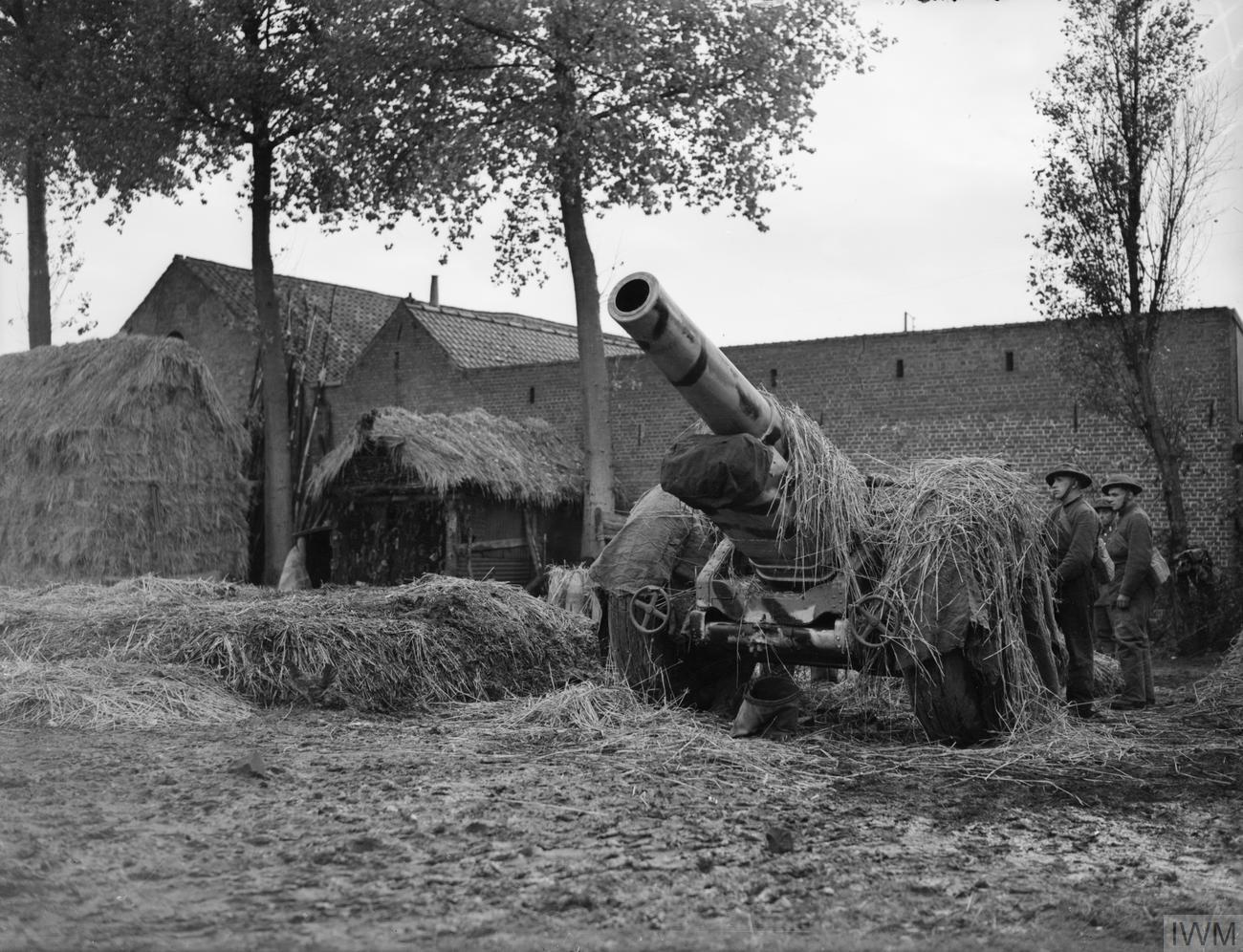
An 8-inch (203.2 mm) howitzer of the British Expeditionary Force in France during the Phoney War

The Phoney War (Note: (French: Drôle de guerre; German: Sitzkrieg; Polish: Dziwna wojna)) was an eight-month period at the outset of World War II, lasting from September 1939 to May 1940, during which there were virtually no major Allied military land operations on the Western Front.

World War II began on 1 September 1939 with Germany's invasion of Poland. This was followed on 3 September by the United Kingdom's and France's declarations of war on Germany, which marked the beginning of the Phoney War period.

Although the Western Allies did not conduct major military actions during the Phoney War, they did implement economic warfare, particularly a naval blockade of Germany, shut down German surface raiders, and formulated elaborate plans for large-scale operations designed to cripple the German war effort. These plans included opening an Anglo-French front in the Balkans, invading Norway to seize control of Germany's main source of iron ore, and imposing an embargo against the Soviet Union, which was Germany's primary oil supplier.

The Phoney War was punctuated by a few isolated Allied military actions. The French invasion of German Saarland on 7 September 1939 was intended to assist Poland by diverting German troops from the Polish front. Only six German divisions were diverted from the Polish front, and France withdrew following a German counteroffensive in October.

In November 1939, the Soviets attacked Finland in the Winter War, eliciting much debate in France and Britain about mounting an offensive to help Finland. However, the necessary forces for this Allied offensive were not assembled until after the Winter War concluded, to neither sides' advantage in March. The Allied discussions about a Scandinavian campaign triggered concern in Germany and resulted in the invasion of Denmark and Norway in April 1940. This then caused the Allies to redirect their troops to Norway, but by April the execution of the Norway plan was considered, by itself, inadequate to stop the German Wehrmacht. Fighting there continued until June 1940, when the Allies evacuated, ceding Norway to Germany in response to the invasion of France.

On the Axis side during the Phoney period, Nazi Germany initiated attacks at sea in the autumn of 1939 and winter of 1940 against British aircraft carriers and destroyers, sinking several, including the carrier HMS Courageous. Aerial combat began in October 1939 when the Luftwaffe launched air raids on British warships. There were minor bombing raids and reconnaissance flights on both sides. Fascist Italy was not involved militarily in the European war at this time.

With the German invasion of France and the Low Countries on 10 May 1940, the ascension of Winston Churchill as Prime Minister of the United Kingdom on the same day, and the massive Dunkirk evacuation commencing sixteen days later on 26 May, the Phoney War ended.

== Etymology ==
"Bore War" was the initial term used by the British. It was likely a pun on the Boer War fought four decades earlier in South Africa. Eventually, the Americanism "Phoney War" became the favoured phrase on both sides of the Atlantic. This term gained currency in the British Empire and Commonwealth in large part to avoid confusion with the South African conflict.

Credit for coining "Phoney War" is generally given to U.S. Senator William Borah who, commenting in September 1939 on the inactivity on the Western Front, said: "There is something phoney about this war." "Phoney War" customarily appears using the British spelling (with an 'e') even in North America, rather than adopting the American spelling, "Phony", although some American sources do not follow the pattern. The first known recorded use of the term in print was in September 1939 in a U.S. newspaper which used the British spelling. Other contemporaneous American instances used "Phony" since both spellings were acceptable. In Great Britain, the term first appeared in print in January 1940.

The Phoney War was also referred to as the "Twilight War" (by Winston Churchill) and as the Sitzkrieg ("the sitting war": a word play on blitzkrieg created by the British press). In French, it is referred to as the drôle de guerre ("funny/strange war"). (Note: Perhaps because of mishearing or a mistranslation, French journalist Roland Dorgelès or other French sources read the English "phoney" as "funny." See fr:Drôle de guerre (in French).)

== Pre-war planning ==
In March 1939, Britain and France formalised plans for how they would conduct war against Nazi Germany. Knowing their enemy would be more prepared and have land and air superiority, the Allies' strategy was to contest any specific German aggressive actions, but to essentially maintain a defensive posture. This would allow time for Britain and France to build up their own military resources and eventually attain economic and naval superiority over Germany.

To this end, Britain initially committed to sending two divisions to France, and two more eleven months later. The Polish Army's plan for defence, Plan West, assumed the Allies would quickly undertake a significant Western Front offensive that would provide relief to the Polish forces in the East. However, the Poles' assumption was proven wrong by the passivity of the Phoney War.

== German invasion of Poland ==
The German invasion of Poland on 1 September 1939 began World War II. On 3 September, in fulfillment of their treaty obligations to Poland, the United Kingdom declared war on Nazi Germany; hours later, France did the same.

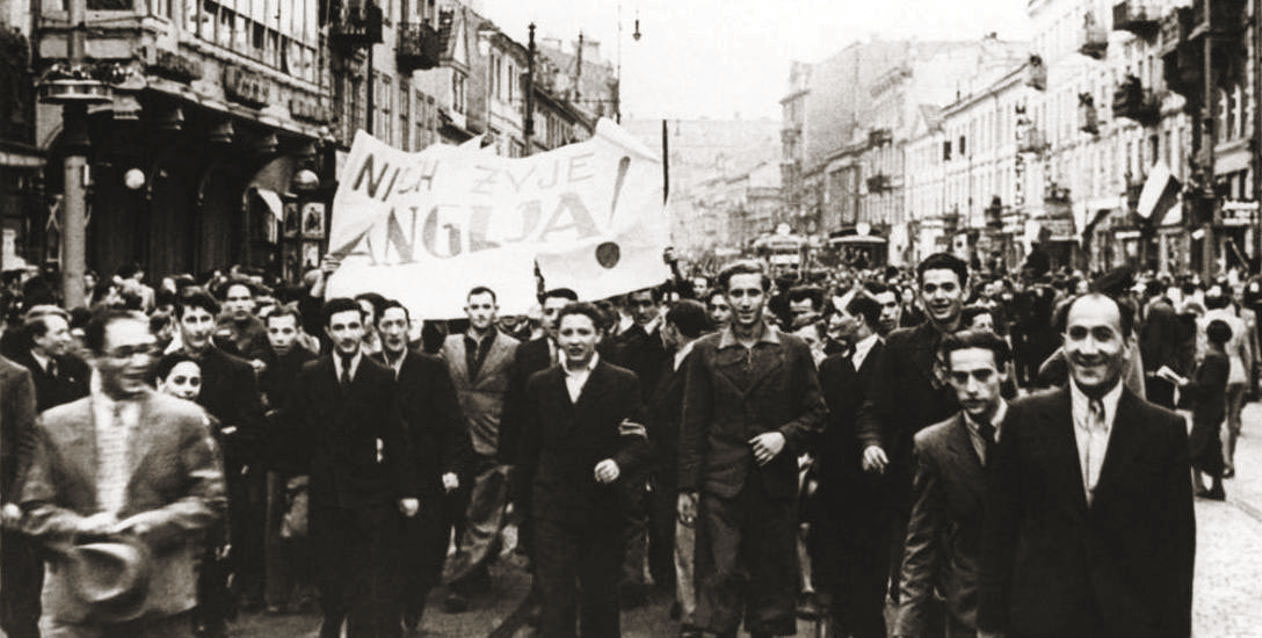
People of Warsaw outside the British Embassy with a banner which says "Long live England!" just after the British declaration of war with Nazi Germany

While most of the German army was engaged in Poland, a much smaller German force manned the Siegfried Line, which was their fortified defensive line along the French border. On 7 September, the French commenced the limited Saar Offensive, but withdrew when their artillery could not penetrate German defences. A further assault was planned for 20 September, but on 17 September, following the USSR's invasion of Poland, the assault was called off.

The Royal Air Force (RAF) launched a bombing raid over the Wilhelmshaven port on 4 September. The Luftwaffe shot down 12 of 22 Vickers Wellington bombers (Battle of the Heligoland Bight). There were occasional dogfights between fighter planes, and the RAF dropped propaganda leaflets on Nazi Germany.

Germany did not launch the expected full-scale air bombardment of British cities. London hospitals prepared for 300,000 casualties in the first week of the war. The U.S. foreign correspondent William Shirer was assigned to Berlin at the onset of World War II. In his diary entries on 9 and 10 September 1939, he wrote about the puzzlement felt by many:

Apparently the war in Poland is all but over. Most of the correspondents a bit depressed. Britain and France have done nothing on the western front to relieve the tremendous pressure on Poland.… One week after the Anglo-French declaration of a state of war the average German is beginning to wonder if it's a world war after all. He sees it this way. England and France, it is true, are formally fulfilling their obligations to Poland. For a week they have been formally at war with Germany. But has it been war? they ask. The British, it is true, sent over twenty-five planes to bomb Wilhelmshaven. But if it is war, why only twenty-five? And if it is war, why only a few leaflets over the Rhineland? The industrial heart of Germany lies along the Rhine close to France. From there come most of the munitions that are blowing up Poland with such deadly effect. Yet not a bomb has fallen on a Rhineland factory. Is that war? they ask.

Britain and France did not know that Nazi Germany used 90% of its frontline aircraft in the Polish invasion. During the invasion, the Nazi regime still hoped to persuade Britain to agree to peace. Both sides found that their early attacks on military targets, such as the British attack on Kiel, led to high losses of aircraft. They both feared massive retaliation for attacking civilian targets. German pilots who bombed Scottish naval bases said they would have been court-martialed and executed if they bombed civilians.

In contrast to the lack of hostilities on land between the Allies and Germany, the fighting on the seas was real. On 3 September, the British liner SS Athenia was torpedoed off the Hebrides with the loss of 112 lives in what was to be the start of the lengthy Battle of the Atlantic. On 4 September, the Allies announced a blockade of Germany to prevent her importing food and raw materials to sustain her war effort; the Germans immediately declared a counter-blockade, while the Soviet Union helped Germany with supplies bypassing the blockade.

After World War II, it was discovered that Nazi Germany's armed forces were vulnerable throughout the September Campaign. They had not yet reached full fighting strength and might have succumbed to a determined opponent, or at least suffered serious damage. At the Nuremberg trials, German military commander Alfred Jodl said that "if we did not collapse already in the year 1939 that was due only to the fact that during the Polish campaign, the approximately 110 French and British divisions in the West were held completely inactive against the 23 German divisions." General Wilhelm Keitel stated: "We soldiers had always expected an attack by France during the Polish campaign, and were very surprised that nothing happened.... A French attack would have encountered only a German military screen, not a real defence." According to General Siegfried Westphal, if the French had attacked in force in September 1939, the German army "could only have held out for one or two weeks."

One reason offered for French and British stalling in September was the memory of the First World War. The two countries had suffered 10 million casualties combined, and were unwilling to fight an offensive war in the same towns and states affected by it.

== Saar Offensive ==
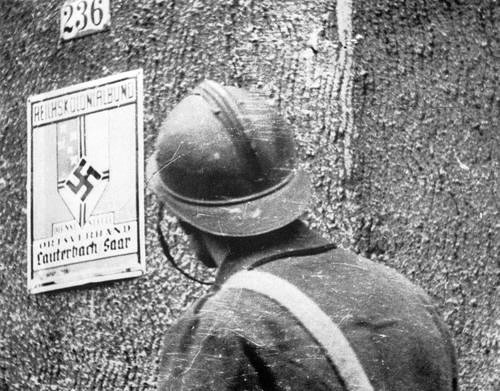
A French soldier outside a Reichskolonialbund office in Lauterbach during the Saar Offensive

French Armed Forces began the Saar Offensive on 7 September 1939, crossing the France–Germany border. It was their only offensive action during the Phoney War. In accordance with orders given by Hitler, Wehrmacht troops of the German 1st Army did not put up any significant resistance, wanting to avoid a two-front war. Fighting broke out in the section between Saarbrücken and the Palatinate Forest, where the offensive was concentrated.

On 12 September, the troops were up to 8 kilometres (5.0 mi) inside German territory, occupying twelve German villages along the evacuated border zone in the Saar region in front of the Siegfried Line. The limited offensive was only intended to assess the strength of the Siegfried Line's defences. On 21 September, General Maurice Gamelin ordered the troops to withdraw to their starting positions on the Maginot Line. On 17 October, the last French troops left German territory. Some French generals, such as Henri Giraud, disagreed with the retreat and saw it as a missed opportunity.

According to the Franco-Polish Alliance, the French Army was to start preparations for a major offensive three days after the beginning of mobilization. The preliminary mobilization had occurred in France on 26 August. By 1 September, full mobilization was declared. The French forces were to gain control over the area between the French border and the German lines, and then to probe the German defences. On the 15th day of the mobilization, the French Army was to start an all-out assault on Germany.

The offensive in the Rhine river valley area began on 7 September. Since the Wehrmacht was occupied in the attack on Poland, the French soldiers enjoyed a decisive numerical advantage along their border with Germany. Eleven French divisions advanced along a 32 km (20 miles) line near Saarbrücken against weak German opposition. The assault was to have been carried out by roughly 40 divisions, including one armoured, three mechanised divisions, 78 artillery regiments and 40 tank battalions. The French Army had advanced to a depth of 8 km (5.0 miles) and captured about 20 villages evacuated by the German army, without any resistance but the half-hearted offensive was halted after France seized the Warndt Forest, 7.8 km^{2} (3.0 sq mi) of heavily mined German territory. The Saar Offensive did not result in the diversion of any German troops from the Polish Front.

On 12 September, the Anglo-French Supreme War Council gathered for the first time at the Abbeville Conference. It decided all offensive actions were to be halted immediately as the French opted to fight a defensive war, forcing the Germans to come to them. General Maurice Gamelin ordered his troops to stop no closer than 1 km (0.62 miles) from German positions along the Siegfried Line. Poland was not notified of this decision. Instead, Gamelin incorrectly informed Marshal Edward Rydz-Śmigły that half of his divisions were in contact with the enemy and that French advances had forced the Wehrmacht to withdraw at least six divisions from Poland. The following day, the commander of the French Military Mission to Poland, General Louis Faury, told the Polish Chief of Staff, General Wacław Stachiewicz, that the major offensive on the Western Front planned from 17 to 20 September had to be postponed. At the same time, French divisions were ordered to withdraw to their barracks along the Maginot Line. This quick cessation of fighting by the French contributed to the "Phoney War" characterization.

== Inactivity ==
In the war's early months, antagonism between the British and German populations was not as bitter as it would later become. British pilots mapped the Siegfried Line while German troops waved at them. On 30 April 1940 when a German Heinkel He 111 bomber crashed at Clacton-on-Sea in Essex—killing its crew and injuring 160 people on the ground—the German crew members were laid to rest in the local cemetery with RAF support. Wreaths with messages of sympathy were displayed on the coffins.

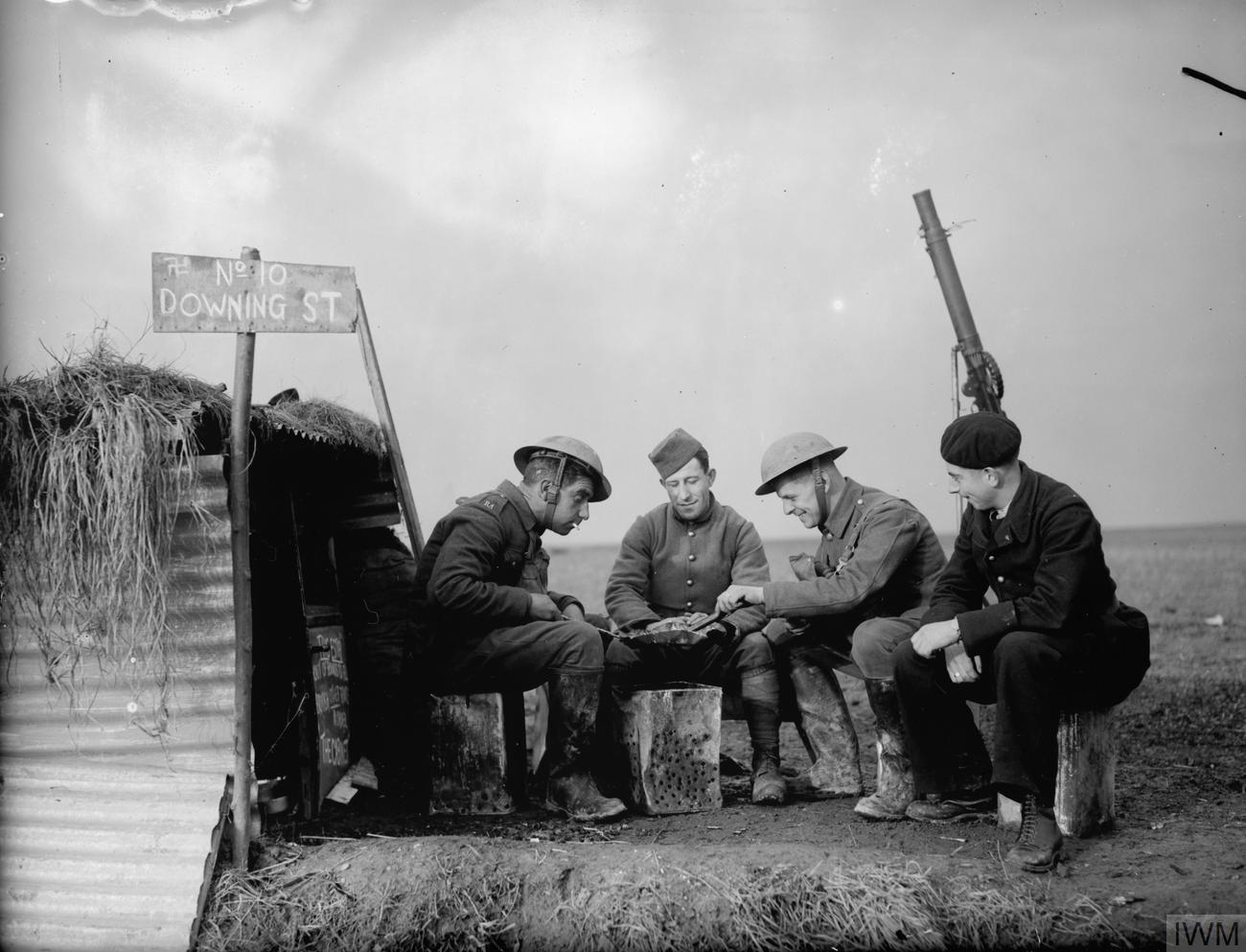
British Army and French Air Force personnel outside a dugout in France in 1939

When British Member of Parliament (MP) Leopold Amery suggested to Kingsley Wood, the Secretary of State for Air, that the Black Forest should be bombed with incendiaries to burn its ammunition dumps, Wood amazed the MP by responding that the forest was "private property" and could not be bombed; neither could weapons factories, as the Germans might do the same to England. In 1939, some officers of the British Expeditionary Force who were stationed in France tried to set up recreational hunting to pass the time. They imported packs of foxhounds and beagles, but were thwarted by French authorities who refused to make the countryside available.

== Winter War ==
The Winter War started with the Soviet Union's assault on Finland on 30 November 1939. Public opinion, particularly in France and Britain, quickly sided with Finland and demanded action from their governments in support of "the brave Finns" against the much larger Soviet aggressors. The public believed that effective defence of the Finns was more achievable than what had been provided for the Poles in the September Campaign.

As a consequence of its attack on Finland, the Soviet Union was expelled from the League of Nations, and a proposed Franco-British expedition to northern Scandinavia was debated. However, the British forces that were assembled to aid Finland were not dispatched in time before the Winter War ended. Instead, they were sent to Norway to help in its campaign against Germany. On 20 March, shortly after the Moscow Peace Treaty concluded the Winter War, Édouard Daladier resigned as Prime Minister of France, in part due to his failure to come to Finland's defence.

== German invasion of Denmark and Norway ==
In February 1940, Norway became a focus of attention as evidenced by the Altmark incident. The Allies openly discussed a possible expedition to northern Scandinavia (even though they had not received a request or consent from the neutral Scandinavian countries) and the occupation of Norway. These developments alarmed the Kriegsmarine and the Nazi government. Such an expedition would threaten their iron ore supplies and gave a strong argument for Germany to secure the Norwegian coast.

Codenamed Operation Weserübung, the German invasion of Denmark and Norway commenced on 9 April. From the 14th, Allied troops were landed in Norway, but by the end of the month, southern parts of Norway were in German hands. The fighting continued in the north until the Allies evacuated in early June in response to the German invasion of France; the Norwegian forces in mainland Norway laid down their arms at midnight on 9 June.

== Change of British government ==
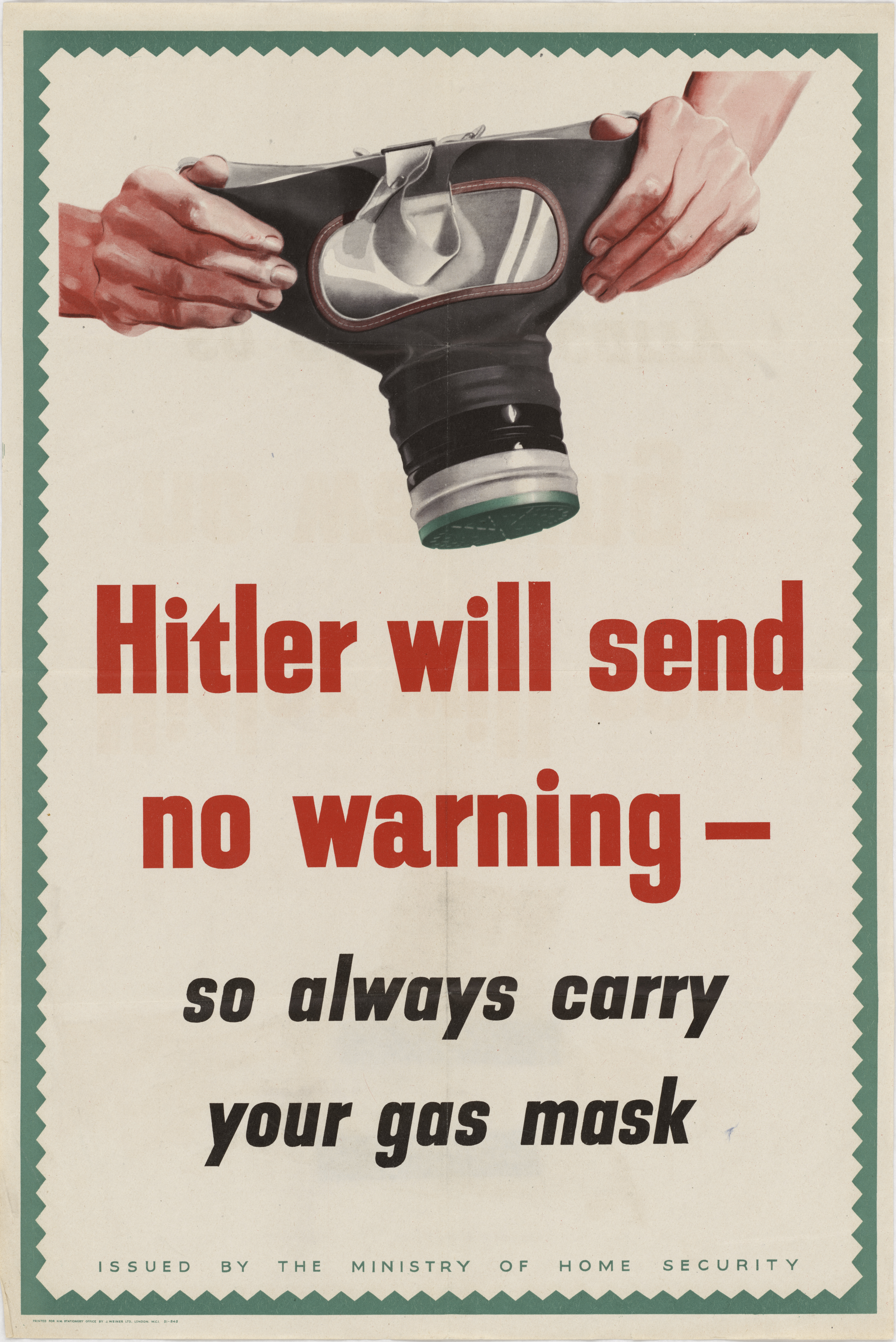
British Ministry of Home Security poster of a type that was common during the Phoney War

The debacle of the Allied campaign in Norway, which was actually an offshoot of the never-realised plans to aid Finland, forced a heated debate in the House of Commons during which Prime Minister Neville Chamberlain was under constant attack. A nominal vote of confidence in his government was won by 281 to 200, but many of Chamberlain's supporters had voted against him while others had abstained. Chamberlain found it impossible to continue to lead a National Government or to form a new coalition government with himself as the leader. So on 10 May, Chamberlain resigned the premiership but retained the leadership of the Conservative Party. Winston Churchill, who had been a consistent opponent of Chamberlain's policy of appeasement, became Chamberlain's successor. Churchill formed a new coalition government that included members of the Conservatives, Labour and the Liberal Party, as well as several ministers from a non-political background.

== Actions ==
Throughout the Phoney War, most of the military clashes occurred at sea as the beginning of the Battle of the Atlantic. Among the notable incidents were:

- On 3 September 1939, a German submarine sank the ship SS Athenia, killing 117 civilian passengers and crew.
- On 4 September 1939, British bombs killed eleven German sailors on the cruiser Emden in port Wilhelmshaven. On that same date, RAF daylight bombing raids on Kriegsmarine warships in the Heligoland Bight proved a costly failure. Seven of the Bristol Blenheim and Vickers Wellington bombers were shot down without any ships being hit. Further ineffective anti-shipping raids—such as the air battle over the Wilhelmshaven naval base on 18 December 1939 which resulted in the loss of 12 out of 22 Wellingtons—led to the abandonment of daylight operations by RAF heavy bombers.
- On 17 September 1939, the British aircraft carrier HMS Courageous was sunk by U-29, the first British warship to be lost in the war. She went down in 15 minutes with the loss of 519 of her crew, including her captain.
- On 14 October 1939, the British battleship HMS Royal Oak was sunk in the British fleet base at Scapa Flow, Orkney (north of mainland Scotland) by U-47. A total of 833 men were lost, including Rear-Admiral Henry Blagrove, commander of the 2nd Battleship Division.
- On 16 October 1939, Luftwaffe air raids on England began when Junkers Ju 88s attacked British warships at Rosyth on the Firth of Forth. Spitfires of 602 and 603 Squadrons succeeded in shooting down two Ju 88s and a Heinkel He 111 over the firth. In a raid on Scapa Flow the next day, one Ju 88 was hit by anti-aircraft fire, crashing on the island of Hoy. The first Luftwaffe plane to be shot down on the British mainland was a He 111 at Haddington, East Lothian, on 28 October, with both 602 and 603 Squadrons claiming this victory. 602 Squadron's Archie McKellar was a principal pilot in both the destruction of the first German attacker over water and over British soil. McKellar (KIA 1 Nov. 1940) went on to be credited with 20 kills during the Battle of Britain, as well as "ace in a day" status by shooting down five Bf 109s; a feat accomplished by only 24 RAF pilots during the entire war.
- In December 1939, the German Deutschland-class cruiser Admiral Graf Spee was attacked by the Royal Navy cruisers HMS Exeter, Ajax and Achilles in the Battle of the River Plate. Admiral Graf Spee fled to the neutral port of Montevideo to carry out repairs on the damage sustained during the battle. She was later scuttled rather than face a large British fleet that the Kriegsmarine believed, incorrectly, was awaiting her departure. The support vessel for Admiral Graf Spee, the tanker Altmark, was captured by the Royal Navy in February 1940 in southern Norway. (See: Battles of Narvik, Altmark Incident.)
- On 19 February 1940, a Kriegsmarine destroyer flotilla embarked on Operation Wikinger, a sortie into the North Sea to disrupt British fishing and submarine activity around the Dogger Bank. En route, two destroyers were lost due to mines and friendly fire from the Luftwaffe; nearly 600 German sailors were killed and the mission was then aborted without ever encountering Allied forces.

British war planning had called for a "knockout blow" by strategic bombing of German industry with the RAF's substantial Bomber Command. However, there was considerable apprehension about German retaliation, and when President Franklin D. Roosevelt proposed a ban on bombing raids which might endanger civilians, Britain and France agreed at once, and Germany agreed two weeks later. The RAF therefore conducted a large number of combined reconnaissance and propaganda leaflet flights over Germany. These operations were jokingly termed "pamphlet raids" or "Confetti War" in the British press.

On 10 May 1940, eight months after the outbreak of war, German troops marched into Belgium, the Netherlands and Luxembourg, marking the end of the Phoney War and the beginning of the Battle of France. Fascist Italy, hoping for territorial gains when France was defeated, entered the European war on 10 June 1940, although the thirty-two Italian divisions which crossed the border with France enjoyed little success against five defending French divisions.

== See also ==
- Operation Pike
- Western betrayal
- Why die for Danzig?
- Timeline of World War II (1939)
