= Higher War School =

Military school of Armed Forces in Warsaw, Poland

- Wyższa Szkoła Wojenna
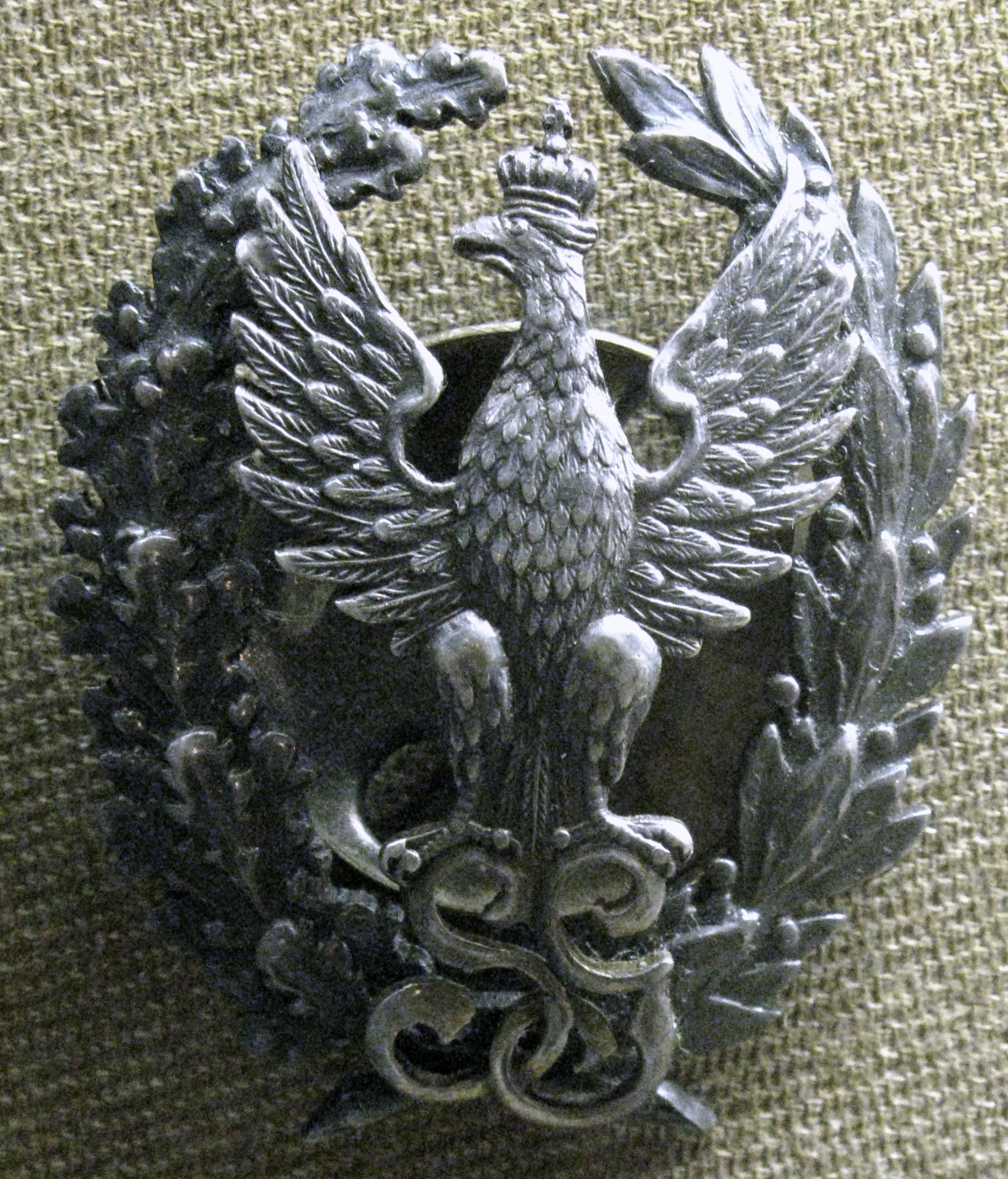
- The sign of certified officers of the General Staff
- Type: Military academy
- Active: 1923–1939
- Location: 79 Koszykowa str. Warsaw, Poland

Higher War School (Polish: Wyższa Szkoła Wojenna, WSWoj) was a higher military school of the Armed Forces of the Second Polish Republic, training and educating staff officers. In the years 1923–1939, the school was located in Warsaw at Koszykowa street 79. It was the most important Polish military academy in the period between the World Wars. Located at Warsaw, it was established to train high-ranking officers of the Polish Armed Forces and of the armed forces of several allied states.

== History ==
After the rebirth of Poland in 1918 and the establishment of the Second Polish Republic and the Polish Armed Forces, there was already a well-trained and experienced cadre of Polish field officers trained in the armies of the partitioners (Russian Empire, Germany and Austria-Hungary) as well as in France. However, the occupants of Poland rarely promoted the Poles to higher ranks and the reborn Polish Army was seriously lacking officers trained in general staff duties and in command of entire armies. To eliminate the problem, in cooperation with the French Military Mission to Poland and the Paris-based École supérieure de guerre, the War School of the General Staff (Polish: Szkoła Wojenna Sztabu Generalnego) was formed in mid-1919.

It was established on the basis of Secret Supplement No. 10 to the Journal of Military Orders. Lieutenant General Stanisław Puchalski was appointed the School's commander, and his advisor was the French General Spire. Lecturers for the School were provided by the French Military Mission. In 1919, the School educated 65 officers on five-month courses. In 1920, the School's activity was interrupted due to the Polish-Bolshevik War. The studies were resumed in January 1921. 65 officers began them. In the autumn of 1921, the studies at the school were extended to two years.

After the Polish–Bolshevik War, on August 16, 1922, the school was renamed to Wyższa Szkoła Wojenna (WSW, Higher War School). The temporary Statute of the Higher Military School was included in the Journal of Military Orders No. 28 of 11.08.1922. In accordance with the regulation of the Prime Minister, the school was recognized as a higher educational institution. The school continued the traditions of the following institutions:

- War Course for General Staff Officers in Warsaw (1917)
- War School of the General Staff in Warsaw (1919–1921)
- General Staff School in Warsaw (1921–1922)

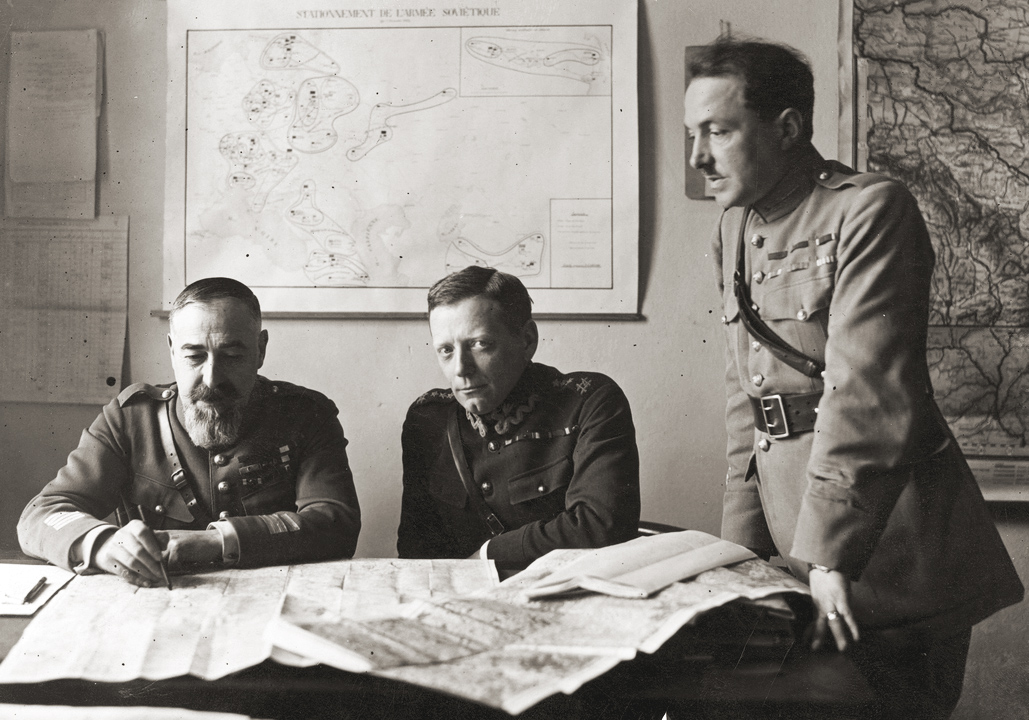
Louis Faury, Franciszek Kleeberg and Major Pillegand at the Higher War School in 1926

The tasks of the School were defined as follows; The school's sole purpose is to provide specialist training for General Staff officers by instilling in particularly talented and experienced professional officers with established strong military character a higher theoretical and practical military education, necessary for service in the General Staff (according to the Provisional Statute). At the beginning of its operation, the school educated and supplemented mostly staff and senior officers (captain-rotmistrz). In subsequent years, the number of junior officers (lieutenants) increased. Lieutenants of permanent service who graduated from the school were appointed captains (rotmistrzs) at the next appointments. Other officers who graduated from WSWoj could be appointed to the next rank a year earlier than required by pragmatics, e.g. a captain in the corps of weapons officers had to serve four years in this rank to be promoted to major, if during that time he graduated from a higher military school, he could be promoted after three years of service to the rank of captain. The school also accepted visitors from other armies, mainly Georgians, Ukrainians, Estonians, Latvians, and one Japanese and one Frenchman.

Until 1928, most professors were French, with Polish officers serving mostly as their assistants. Among them was Charles de Gaulle, the future president of France, who was a professor of tactics. The training was not limited to military affairs and among the civilians working there were some of the most notable scientists of the era, including Tadeusz Kotarbiński, Edward Lipiński and Marian Kukiel. Apart from the theoreticians, the professors included a large number of officers who gained combat experience in World War I, Polish–Bolshevik War, Polish–Ukrainian War and Polish–Lithuanian War, as well as the Greater Poland Uprising and Silesian Uprisings. Because of their experience, the school became prestigious and attracted many students from abroad, most notably from France, Georgia, Estonia, Latvia and even Japan. Among them were also the officers of the former Ukrainian army of Semen Petlura and White Russian emigrees.

The regular course lasted two years. Graduates received a General Staff officer's academic diploma, from 1929 a certified officer's academic diploma, and from 1933 a certified officer's academic title. By 1939, the school had graduated over a thousand graduates, and in the years 1941–1946 another 296 were promoted.

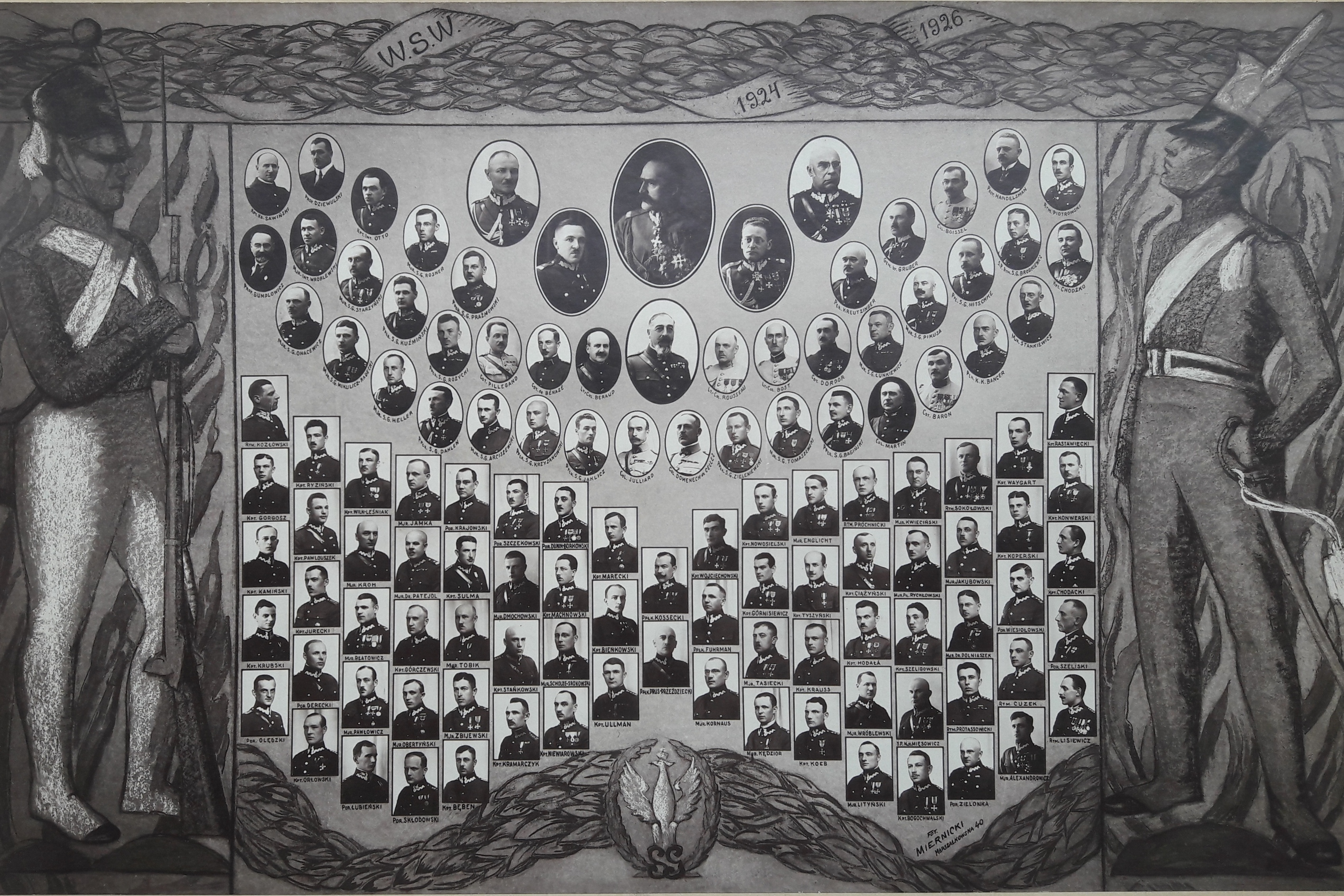
Staff and graduates of the Higher War School in 1926

On December 22, 1928, the Minister of Military Affairs changed the previous name "General Staff" to "Main Staff" and the title "General Staff Officer" to "Certified Officer", and also granted certified officers of all ranks the right to wear the previous insignia of General Staff officers.

Initially, the curriculum was based on French models. The French military mission, and especially Colonel Ludwik Faury, had a huge influence on the education process. In the years 1928–1939, General Tadeusz Kutrzeba was the commander of the General Staff School.

On December 15, 1920, the Minister of Military Affairs transferred "general management of the General Staff School and all related matters to the Chief of the General Staff". In matters of accommodation, economy, health and discipline, the school was subordinate to the commander of Corps District No. I.

In the first decade of March 1923, the school was moved from its temporary location at al. J.Ch. Szucha 23 and from the cavalry barracks at the then Huzarska 1/5 to the former Russian artillery barracks at Filtry at ul. Koszykowa 79, corner of Sucha (today Krzywickiego), with the exception of refresher courses, which until 1925 were conducted in the building of the Infantry Cadet School, Al. Ujazdowskie 1/7.

On March 19, 1923, on the School Day, the ceremony of consecration of the building at 79 Koszykowa Street took place. The ceremony was attended by the President of Poland Stanisław Wojciechowski, the Prime Minister, Maj. Gen. Władysław Sikorski, acting for the sick Minister of Military Affairs, Maj. Gen. Aleksander Osiński, Deputy Minister of Military Affairs, Dr. Jan Waygart, First Deputy Chief of the General Staff, Brig. Gen. Józef Rybak, Deputy Commander of Corps District No. I, Brig. Gen. Eugeniusz Pogorzelski, Commandant of the Capital City of Warsaw, Brig. Gen. Stefan Suszyński, General Inspector of Cavalry, Lieutenant General Tadeusz Rozwadowski and the head of the French Military Mission, Maj. Gen. Charles Joseph Dupont. On Friday, May 4, 1923, the school was visited by Marshal of France and Marshal of Poland Ferdinand Foch.

In 1932, the school was subordinated to the General Inspector of the Armed Forces. After the war, the building was handed over to the Warsaw University of Technology and today it houses the Business School and part of the Faculty of Transport of the Warsaw University of Technology.

During the 20 years of its existence, the academy trained more than 1300 officers of the Polish Armed Forces. Most of them repaid the debt for Poland during the Polish Defensive War of 1939, while the majority of professors formed the staff of Poznań Army, the most successful of Polish Armies in the 1939 campaign.

After Poland was overrun by Nazi Germany and the Soviet Union, the school was closed. However, on November 11, 1940, it was recreated in London. It trained the officers of the Polish Army in Exile, fighting alongside the Allies on all fronts of World War II. The professors were recruited from among the active officers of the Polish HQ and the students included many of the notable generals of the Polish forces in Exile. In addition, the school was the alma mater of all highest-ranking Czechoslovak officers of the exiled army. It was closed in 1946, after the Allies withdrew their support for the Polish government. Meanwhile, in Poland, a communist regime took power and a new military academy was established in 1947, the Świerczewski General Staff Academy.

== Sources ==
- Maliszewski, Lech (2022). "Zasłużeni dla Francji, zasłużeni dla Polski. Francuscy oficerowie w polskich uczelniach wojskowych, czyli prowadzenie wojny na sposób francuski" [Distinguished for France, Distinguished for Poland. French officers in Polish military academies, or waging war the French way.] (PDF). Krakowskie Studia Międzynarodowe (in Polish). 19 (2): 57–68. doi:10.48269/2451-0610-ksm-2022-2-003. ISSN 1733-2680.
