= Medelsheim =

- Ortsteil of Gersheim
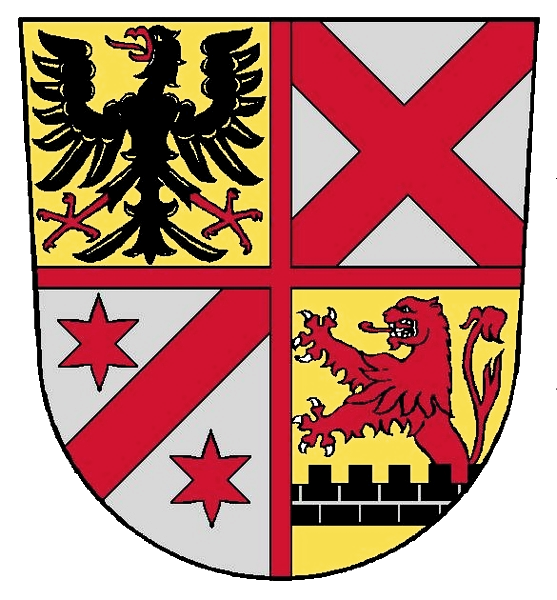
- Coat of arms
- Interactive map of Medelsheim
- Location within Germany Location within Saarland
- Coordinates: 49°08′N 07°12′E
- Country: Germany
- State: Saarland
- District: Saarpfalz
- Municipality: Gersheim

Area
  - Total: 8.81 km^{2} (3.40 sq mi)
- Elevation: 310 m (1,020 ft)

Population (2000)
  - Total: 487
  - Density: 55.3/km^{2} (143/sq mi)
- Demonym: Medelsheimer
- Time zone: UTC+01:00 (CET)
  - Summer (DST): UTC+02:00 (CEST)
- Postal codes: 66453
- Dialling codes: 06844
- Website: Official website

Medelsheim is a German village, part of the municipality of Gersheim, in the Saarpfalz-Kreis, Saarland.

== Geography ==
Medelsheim is in the Parr countryside. In the south, the municipal border is the state border with France. To the east is the German state of Rheinland Pfalz.

== Politics ==
The districts of Medelsheim and Seyweiler together form a municipality. Of the nine seats in the local council, all belong to the CDU. (2019)

== History ==
Archeological finds in Medelsheim span the period from the early Bronze Age through the Gallo-Roman period. The earliest written mention of the village of "Medilinesheim" is found in a June 28, 888 charter of the East Frankish King Arnulf.

During World War II Medelsheim was briefly occupied at the beginning of the war by French troops during the September 1939 Saar Offensive. It was reoccupied by German troops the next month.

In 1995 Medelsheim was awarded a gold medal in the nationwide competition "Unser Dorf soll schöner werden" ("Our village should become more beautiful").

== Population ==
As of 2013 Medelsheim has a population of approximately 480.
