= Der Pilger =

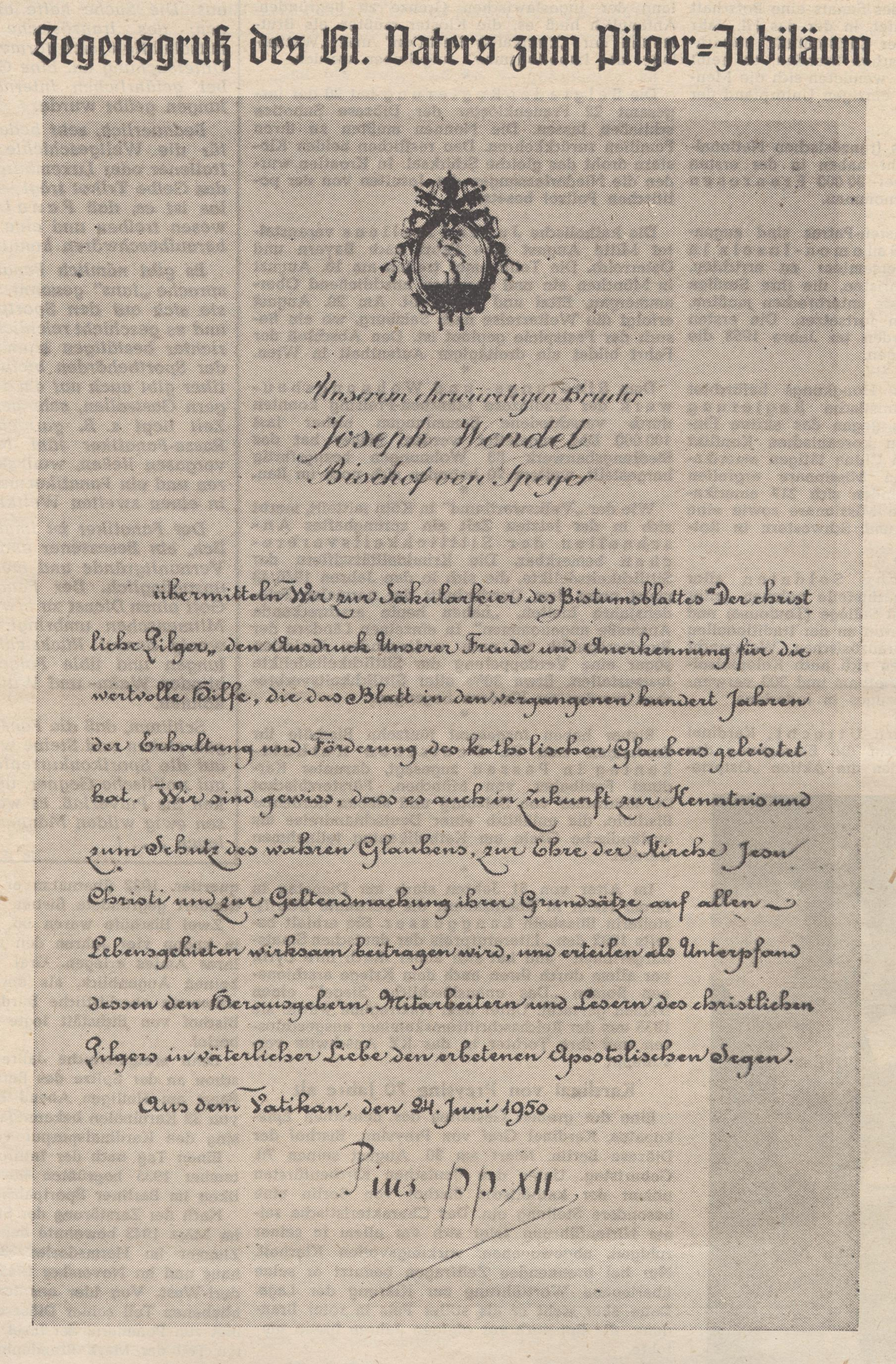
Congratulations from pope Pius XII on the paper's 100th anniversary (celebrated in 1950, since it was inactive for two years during the Second World War).

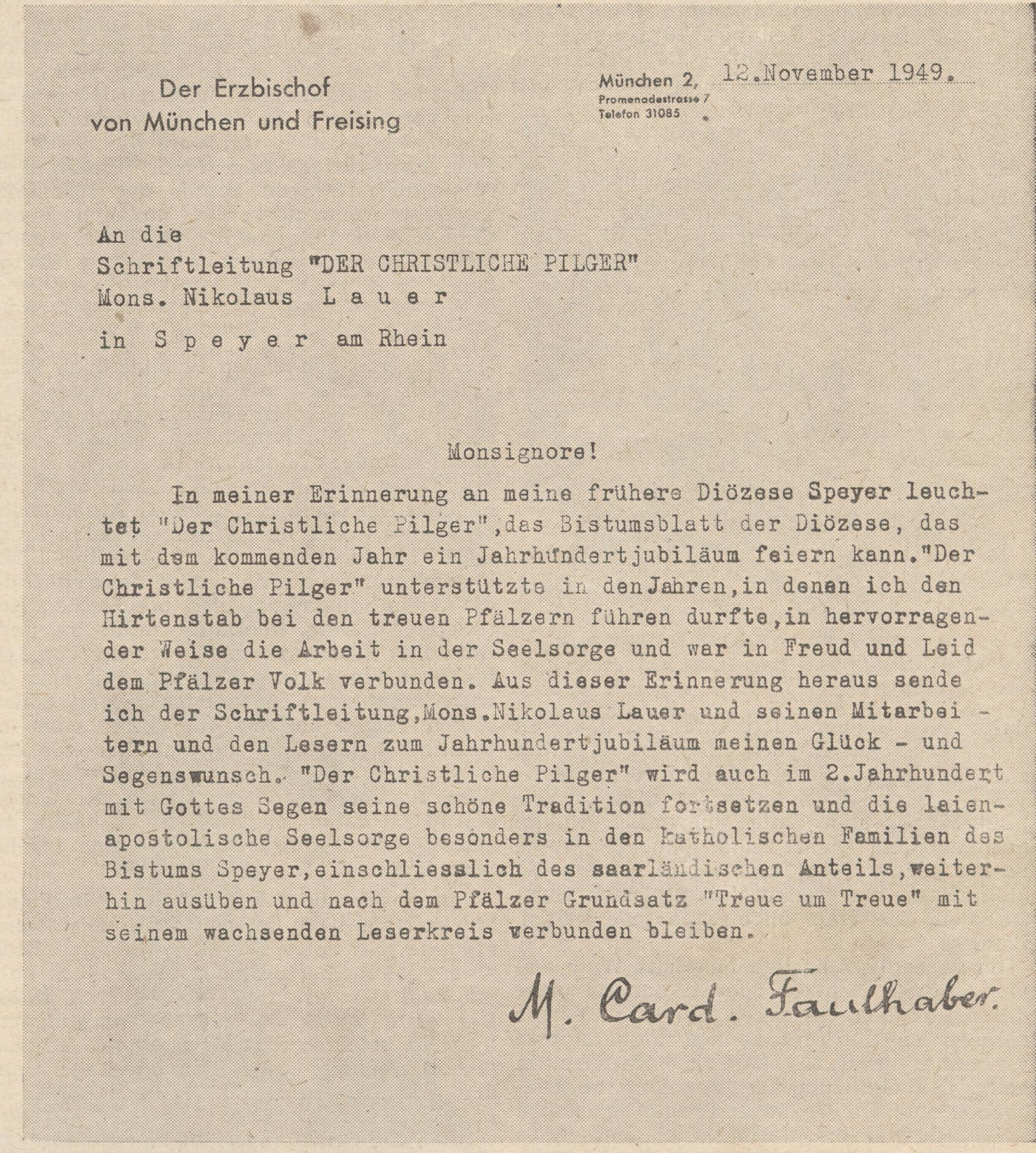
Centenary congratulations from cardinal Michael von Faulhaber, 1950

Der Pilger (The Pilgrim; known until 1960 as Der christliche Pilger, meaning The Christian Pilgrim) is the weekly newsletter of the Roman Catholic diocese of Speyer in Germany. It was founded on 1 January 1848, making it the oldest diocesan newspaper in Germany and older than the Osservatore Romano. The paper founded the "Die Aktion Silbermöve" fundraising campaign in 1960 and this produces around 1 million Euros annually.

The paper reports on church life in the diocese and international events in the Catholic Church, along with comment on news and political events from a Catholic perspective. It also includes religious texts such as prayers and interpretations of the week's scripture readings. The entertainment section offers book and theatre reviews, short stories, puzzles and recipes.
