= Bliesbruck =

- Commune
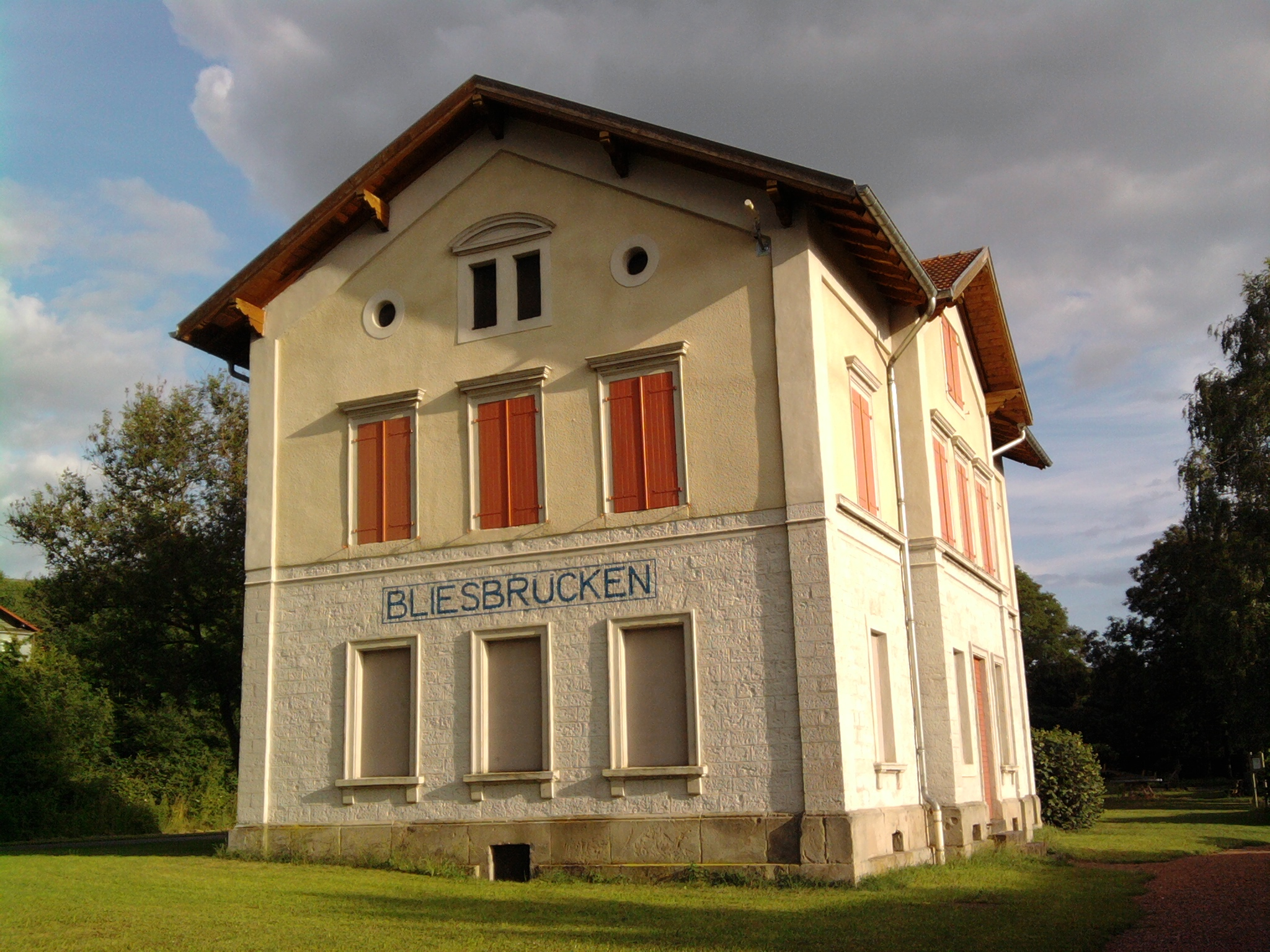
- The old railway station in Bliesbruck

- Coat of arms
- Location of Bliesbruck
- Location within France Location within Grand Est
- Coordinates: 49°06′58″N 7°10′53″E
- Country: France
- Region: Grand Est
- Department: Moselle
- Arrondissement: Sarreguemines
- Canton: Sarreguemines
- Intercommunality: CA Sarreguemines Confluences

Government
  - Mayor (2020–2026): Jean-Luc Lutz
- Area^{1}: 10.88 km^{2} (4.20 sq mi)
- Highest elevation: 362 m (1,188 ft)
- Lowest elevation: 202 m (663 ft)
- Population (2023): 961
  - Density: 88.3/km^{2} (229/sq mi)
- Time zone: UTC+01:00 (CET)
  - Summer (DST): UTC+02:00 (CEST)
- INSEE/Postal code: 57091 /57200
- ^{1} French Land Register data, which excludes lakes, ponds, glaciers > 1 km^{2} (0.386 sq mi or 247 acres) and river estuaries.

Bliesbruck (French pronunciation: [blizbʁyk]; German: Bliesbrücken) is a commune in the Moselle department in Grand Est in northeastern France.

== History ==
According to carved stone objects found in the village area, the valley of the Blies was inhabited by people since before the region belonged to the Roman Republic.

Later, new peoples settled in the region, such as the Celts, Belgians and Ligurians.

Before the conquest of the Gauls in 52 B.C. the area was apparently populated by the Mediomatrici.

Under the Roman Republic and Roman Empire, the region experienced phenomenal growth. It can be noted that the town of Steinfelder, corresponds to the current location of the archaeological excavations of Bliesbruck-Reinheim.

The only testimony of the Merovingian era in the commune, is the discovery of four Merovingian warriors' tombs.

== Toponymy ==
The name Bliesbruck, is a reduction of the German-speaking name of the village, which is Bliesbrücken. This means "bridges over the Blies", in fact, Brücke means "bridge" in German and takes -en in the plural. It must refer to the fact that the bridge connecting the two main parts of the village was often rebuilt, the first being a simple wooden bridge, then replaced by a vaulted bridge, destroyed during the Second World War, then replaced by a wooden bridge by the French and the Americans. It was only in the 1970s that the current bridge was built.

== Population ==
Historical population
Year	Pop.	±% p.a.
1968	918	—
1975	867	−0.81%
1982	965	+1.54%
1990	915	−0.66%
1999	985	+0.82%
2007	1,017	+0.40%
2012	1,008	−0.18%
2017	1,017	+0.18%
2023	961	−0.94%
Source: INSEE

== Twin Towns and sister cities ==
Bliesbruck is twinned with :

- Millery, France

== Cultural heritage and architecture ==
=== Historical heritage ===
==== The European Archaeological Park of Bliesbruck-Reinheim ====
This archaeological park is located in Bliesbruck but also in a German town named Gersheim. It is a cross-border project which combines excavations and reconstructions of Celtic and Roman finds with exhibition and educational facilities.

==== Roman thermae ====
It is a Roman thermal complex that operated from the end of the 1st to the middle of the 3rd century

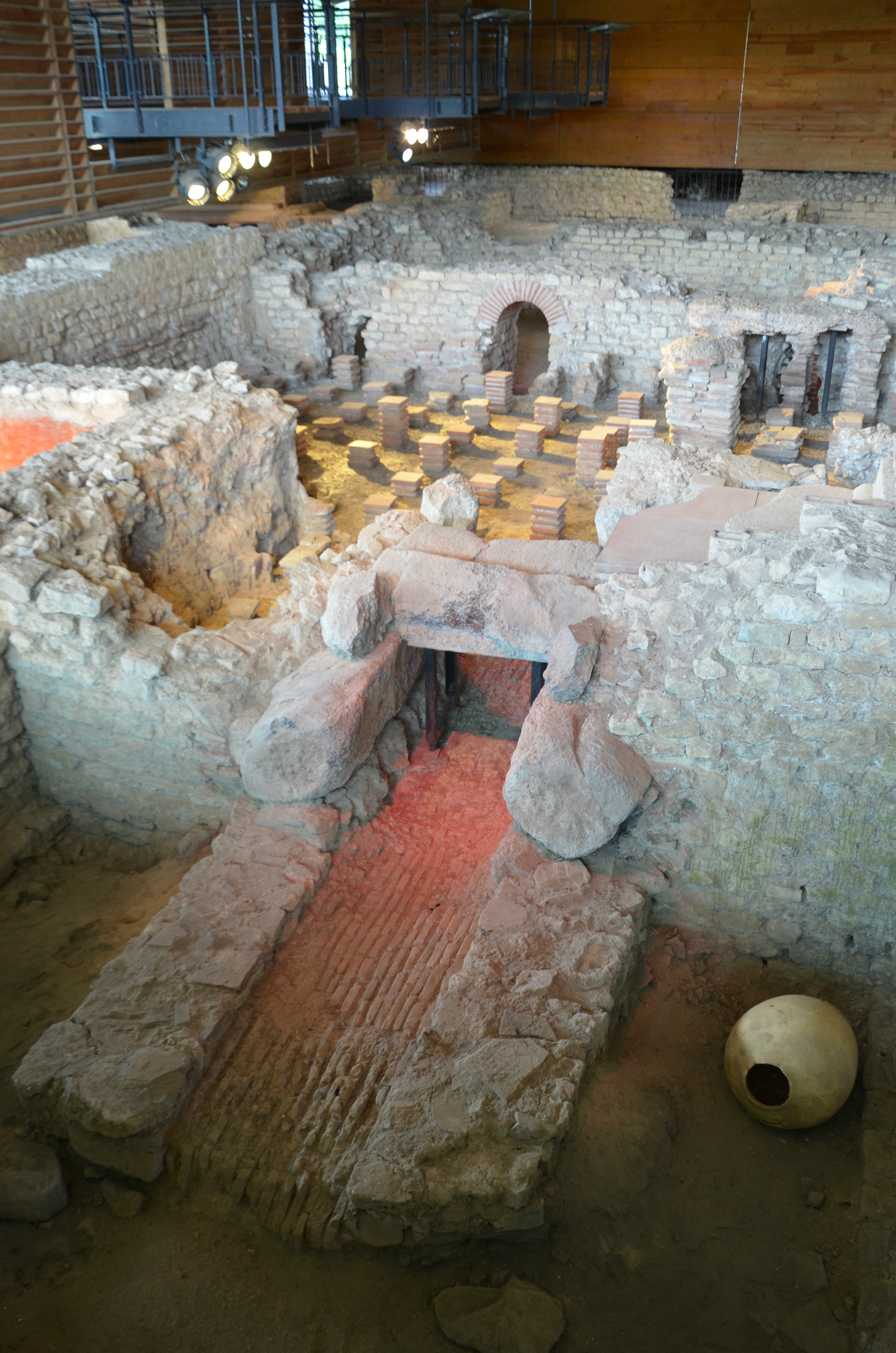
The furnace of the caldarium in the thermae

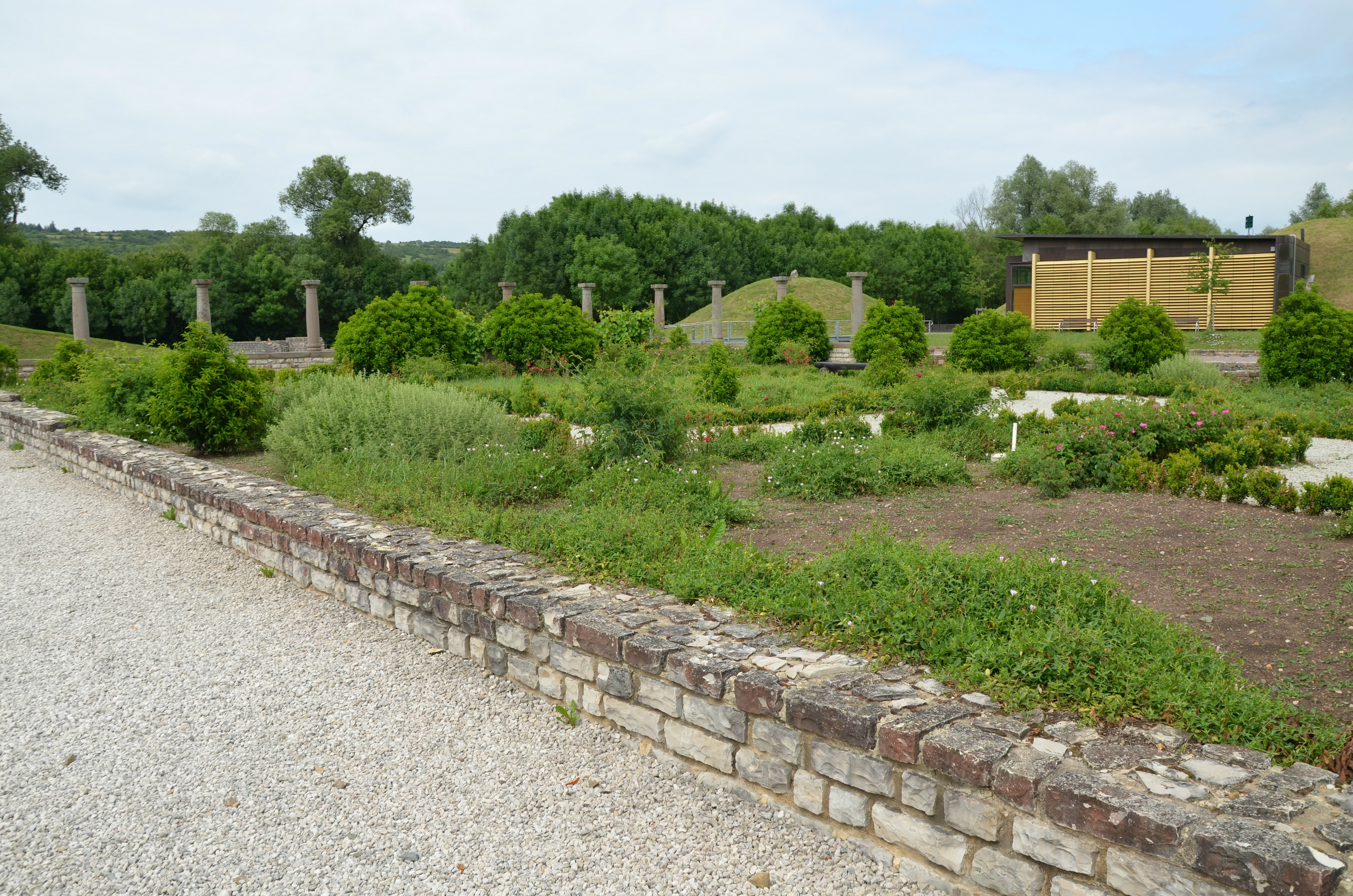
The recreated garden of the pars urbana in the Archaeological Park

== See also ==
- Communes of the Moselle department
