= Gersheim =

- Municipality
- Coat of arms

- Location of Gersheim within Saarpfalz district
- Interactive map of Gersheim
- Location within Germany Location within Saarland
- Coordinates: 49°8′N 7°12′E
- Country: Germany
- State: Saarland
- District: Saarpfalz

Government
  - Mayor (2019–29): Michael Clivot (SPD)

Area
  - Total: 57.37 km^{2} (22.15 sq mi)
- Elevation: 233 m (764 ft)

Population (2025-12-31)
  - Total: 6,191
  - Density: 107.9/km^{2} (279.5/sq mi)
- Time zone: UTC+01:00 (CET)
  - Summer (DST): UTC+02:00 (CEST)
- Postal codes: 66451–66453
- Dialling codes: 06843 and 06844
- Vehicle registration: HOM
- Website: www.gersheim.de

Gersheim (German pronunciation: [ˈɡɛʁshaɪm]) is a municipality in the Saarpfalz district, in Saarland, Germany. In its southwest it borders the French region Grand Est. Gersheim is located approximately 15 km southwest of Zweibrücken, and 20 km southeast of Saarbrücken.

== Settlements ==
The municipality (Gemeinde Gersheim) consists of the villages

- Gersheim
- Bliesdalheim
- Herbitzheim
- Rubenheim
- Walsheim
- Medelsheim
- Reinheim
- Seyweiler
- Niedergailbach
- Peppenkum
- Utweiler

== History ==
The oldest known traces of human settlement are Celtic tumuli on several hilltops.

The gaulic tribe of the Mediomatrici had its main settlement in this region at the site of modern town of Metz. Notable mediomatrician findings can be seen at the European Archaeological Park of Bliesbruck-Reinheim.

Gaul later became part of the Roman Empire.

After the fall of the empire in the Migration Period, the area was occupied by Germanic tribes who eventually formed a frankish kingdom. The ending 'heim' and 'weiler' of most of the village names in the region hints that they might be founded in the early medivian, Merovingian era.

Under changing local noble rulers the villages became part of Lotharingia, Burgundy and the Spanish Netherlands over the medieval centuries.

The devastation of the Thirty Years' War almost completely depopulated the whole region, so new settlers from the alpine countries were relocated to the North. This led to long lasting bonds like the annual fair 'Kleintiroler Weiherfest' (see Tirol) in Rubenheim.

With the French Revolutionary Wars the area became part of the French Empire. With the Congress of Vienna the villages were handed over to the Bavarian Kingdom and as part of the Rhenish Palatinate they became the very western border of Bavaria until the year 1946.

After World War II the region was occupied by France and kept as semi-independent Saar Protectorate until, after a referendum, it became a state of West Germany in 1957.

The village of Gersheim itself was first mentioned officially under the name 'Geroldesheim' in the year 1150.

The municipality Gemeinde Gersheim was founded by dissolving and reorganising several neighboring communities as part of an administrative reform in 1974.

== Geography ==
The municipality has a size of 57,4 square kilometer. The area consists of low hills up to 400m above sea level. Most of the ground is Muschelkalk aside of a small sandstone area east of Bliesdalheim.

The most notable water body is the river Blies.

Gersheim borders the municipalities Mandelbachtal in the northwest and Blieskastel in the northeast and east. On the French side the Gemeinde Gersheim borders the communes Blies-Ébersing, Bliesbruck, Obergailbach, Erching and Ormersviller of the Arrondissement of Sarreguemines in the Departement de Moselle.

Parts of the area are restricted in use or access for environmental reasons as Gersheim became part of the UNESCO Biosphere Reserve Bliesgau in 2009.

== Economy ==
Gersheim is mostly a Bedroom community. This has some tradition as many men from the villages over the last centuries travelled to the industrial centres of the Saarland on a daily basis to work mainly as coal miners (Kumpel) or steel workers.

Business in Gersheim decreased noticeably since the 1980s as e. g. the number of farmers reduced and industrial enterprises like chalk mining and cement production ended. The local railway line 'Bliestalbahn' closed end of the 1990s.

This unfortunately led to an accumulation of public credits, leading to the Gemeinde Gersheim holding the 'first place' of having the highest debt of the municipalities over many years.

Gersheim approaches soft tourism to counter this, using the status within the UNESCO biosphere area. Around the Gersheim village itself, guided tours to see rare orchids are offered.

== Notable Persons ==
- Ludwig Maria Hugo (* 1871 in Arzheim; † 1935 in Mainz), Bishop of Mainz (1921 bis 1935) was from 1911 to 1915 priest of Bliesdalheim
- Hans Joachim Hillerbrand (* 13. September 1931 in Gersheim; † 14. November 2020 in Evanston, Illinois), historian at Duke University, provost at Southern Methodist University

== Sister Communities ==
- Bazancourt, Marne including a partnership of the local schools (Jumelage)
- Gmina Porąbka
- Herbitzheim (only between the German and French village of the same name)
