= Ommersheim =

Town in Saarland, Germany

Coordinates: 49°13′17″N 7°09′20″E

Ommersheim is a town in Saarland, Germany. It is in the municipality of Mandelbachtal, around 15 km by road east of Saarbrücken.
