= French Military Mission to Poland =

Aid from France to Poland during the Polish-Soviet War

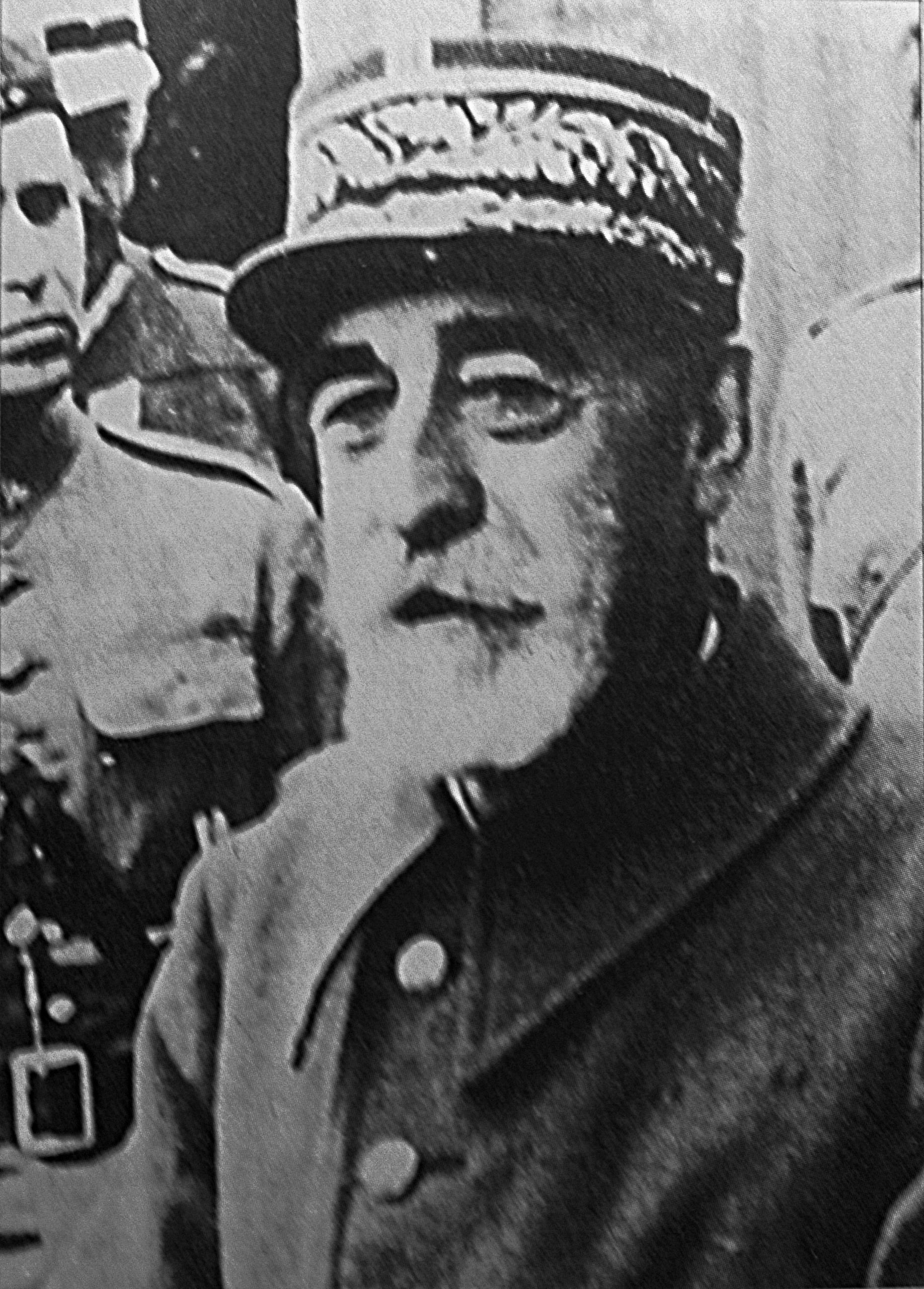
Louis Faury, head of the French Military Mission to Poland in 1939

The French Military Mission to Poland was an effort by France to aid the nascent Second Polish Republic after it achieved its independence in November 1918, at the end of the First World War. The aim was to provide aid during the Polish-Soviet War (1919–1921), and to create a strong Polish military to serve as a useful ally against Germany. It was an advisory body consisting of about 400 French officers attached to staffs of Polish units at various levels. Although the French mission was small numerically, its effect was substantial in improving the organisation and logistics of the Polish army. It worked in parallel with the smaller British Military Mission to Poland. It existed from 1918 to 1939.

Its first commander was French General Paul Prosper Henrys, previously the commander of French forces in the Balkans. The French mission, composed of 400 officer-instructors, met with much respect. The instructors, many of them centered on the Polish General Staff, were crucial in training the emerging Polish officer corps. The French effort was vital in improving the organisation of the newly formed Polish army, which up till 1919 used various manuals, organisation structures and equipment, mostly from the former partitioners' armies. Among the French officers was the future President of France, Charles de Gaulle.

== See also ==
- Blue Army
- Western betrayal
- French Military Mission to Czechoslovakia
