= Louis Faury =

French military officer (1874–1947)

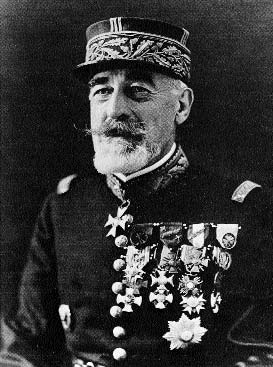
Faury, c. 1924

Louis Faury (French: [lwi foʁi]; 21 July 1874 – 14 January 1947) was a French military officer. In the 1920s, he acted as a chief of the General Staff Academy in Poland. Well known to his Polish students under nickname "Papa Faury". He was made General Officer commanding the 3rd Division in 1936. From 23 August 1939 until 17 September 1939, he led the French military mission in Poland (until Soviet invasion of Poland).

Faury retired from the French Army later on in 1939. He was awarded as a Grand Officer of the Legion of Honour that same year.

== Recommended literature ==
- Louis Faury La Pologne Terrassée in: Revue Historique de l’Armée, IX nr 1 (1953), Paris 1953, p. 132–136.

== See also ==
- Western betrayal
