= Oppidum du Fossé des Pandours =

2nd-century BC Celtic urban center in Grand Est, France

Fossé des Pandours Oppidum
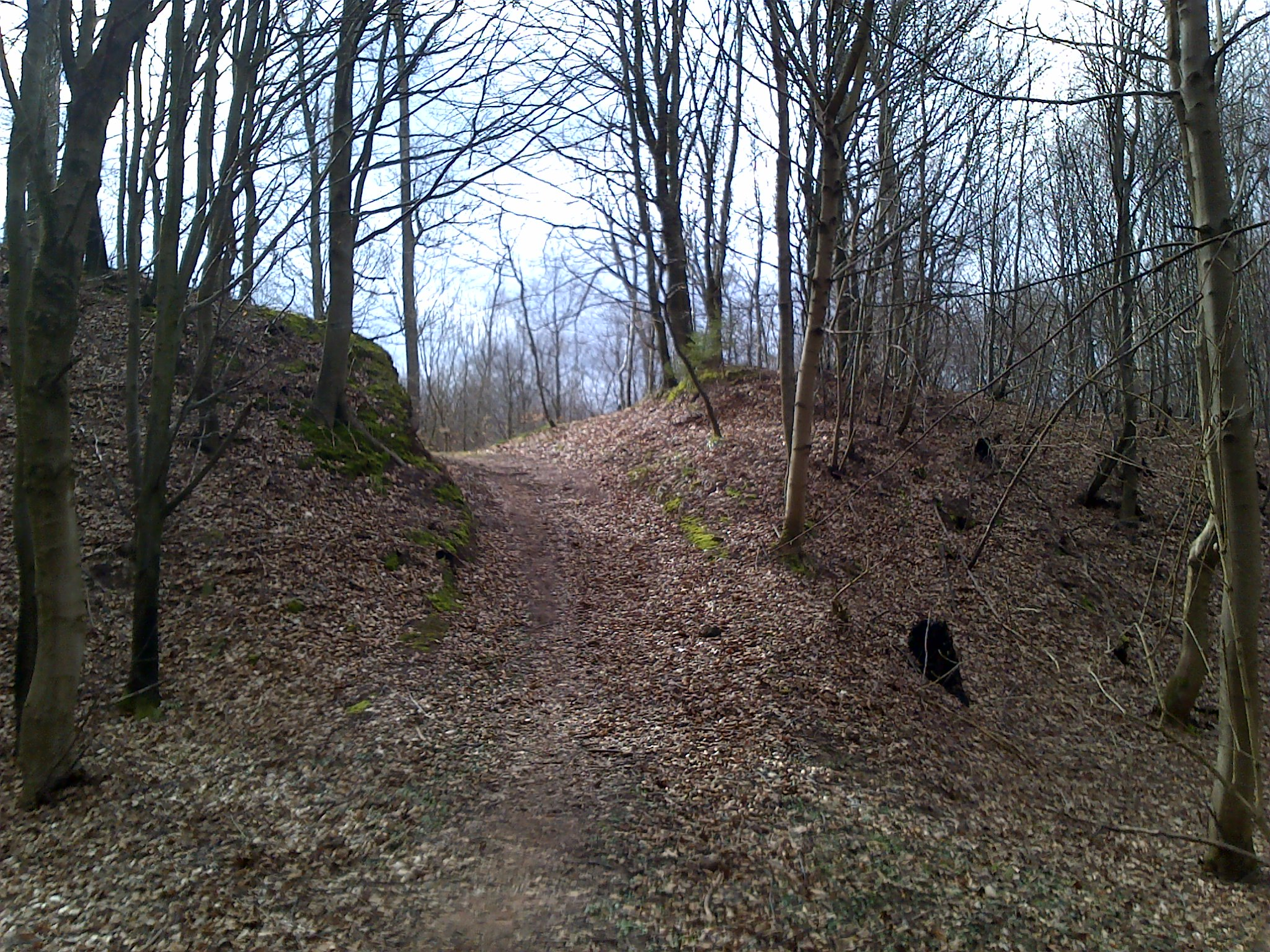
- The rampart of the oppidum, also known as Fossé des Pandours (Pandour Ditch)

- Location within France
- 48°45′25″N 7°19′44″E
- Location: Bas-Rhin, Grand Est, France

Site notes
- Area: 170 ha (420 acres)

The Oppidum du Fossé des Pandours is an urban center of the Celtic people known as the Mediomatrici. It was established near the Saverne Pass, within the territory of the modern communes of Saverne and Ottersthal (Bas-Rhin). It is the largest oppidum in the region of Alsace.

The territory of the Mediomatrici is home to several oppida. Although the Fossé des Pandours has yet to be fully excavated, several factors indicate that it was the largest oppidum of the Mediomatrici in Alsace, at least until the arrival of Ariovistus in the region. The Fossé des Pandours is one of two known archaeological sites at the Saverne Pass, the other being the Gallo-Roman station of Uspann. A Gallo-Roman necropolis was also discovered to the west of the oppidum.

The site's name originated in the 18th century when it was used to refer to the Pandours of Baron von Trenck during the War of the Austrian Succession (1740–1744). This conflict originated from opposition to the Pragmatic Sanction, a decree issued by Emperor Charles VI of the Holy Roman Empire that bequeathed the hereditary territories of the House of Habsburg to his daughter, Maria Theresa of Austria. In 1744, these mercenaries, serving under the command of Maria Theresa, successfully occupied Saverne.

== Contexts ==
=== Geography: The Saverne Pass ===
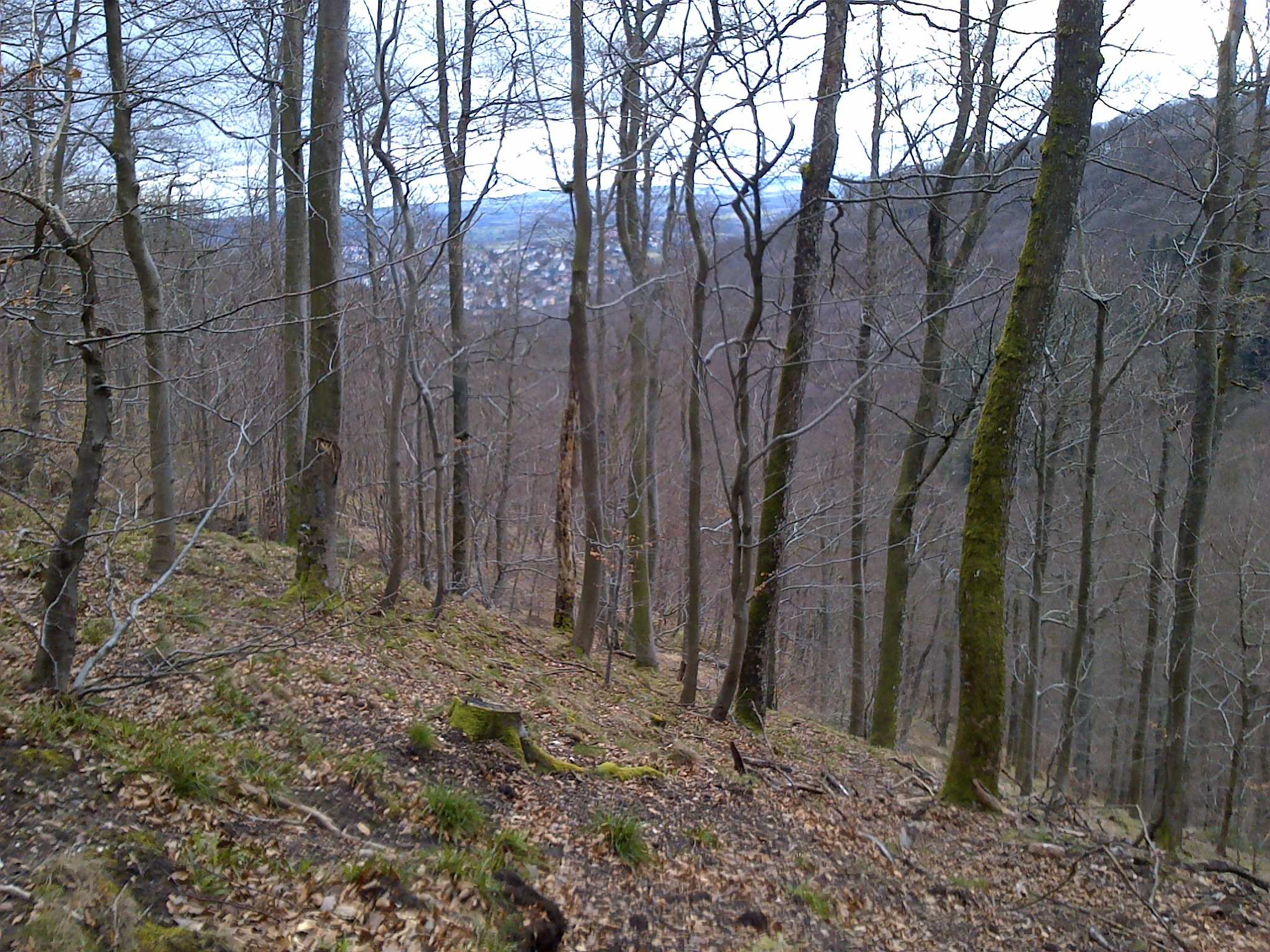
Landscape of the Saverne Pass with the Schlettenbach valley.

The Vosges Mountains constitute a substantial barrier between the Lorraine Plateau (part of the eastern Paris Basin) and the Rhine Plain. The most accessible crossing points are the Saverne Pass (417 m) in the north and the Belfort Gap (345 m) in the south. The intervening valleys are precipitous, rendering the establishment of cart roads a challenging endeavor.

The Saverne Pass occupies a central position in the strategic west-east axis that connects central Gaul (comprising the territories of the Carnutes, Senones, Tricasses, and Remi) with the Rhine Valley. (Note: Flotté & Fuchs 2001, p. 551)

The topography of the Saverne area is typified by elevated terrain and a rugged landscape. This is situated within a distinctive geological zone, the Saverne Fault Field, which forms part of the Rhine Graben. This geomorphological feature is responsible for the distinctive rolling topography of the pre-Vosgian hills.

The oppidum consists of three summits: Barbarakopf, Baerenkupfel, and Koepfel, which extend southward to another Vosgian summit, Kaestenberg.

=== History: The Mediomatrici ===
The Mediomatrici were one of the Celtic peoples who settled in the area between the Rhine and the Pyrenees from the 6th century BC onwards. This region, which the Romans later named Gaul, was occupied by the Mediomatrici between the Meuse and the Rhine, from Argonne to the Black Forest. Their capital was the oppidum of Divodurum, which is now known as the Sainte-Croix district in Metz.

The territory of the Mediomatrici exercised control over a trade route between Gaul and Germania, which included the Saverne Pass. In the 2nd century BC, they constructed a fortress at this location, presumably to monitor the pass and take advantage of a rocky promontory overlooking the site.

== History of the site ==
=== Antiquity ===
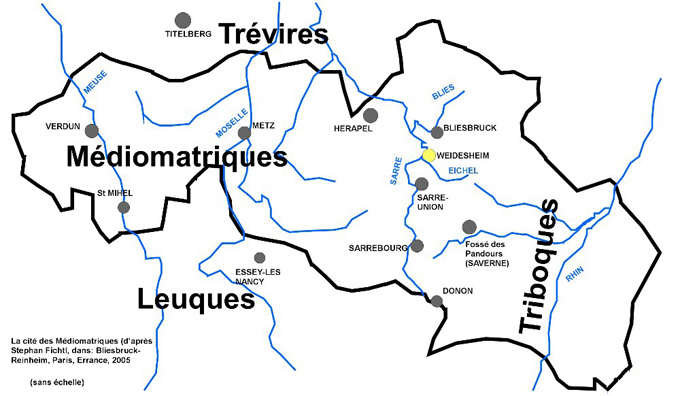
Location of Médiomatriques and the oppidum of the Fossé des Pandours in the 1st century BC, at the start of the Gallic War.

This settlement of the Mediomatrici was one their oppida, at about 77 miles from Divodurum Mediomatricorum, their capital. Their territory, spanning approximately 250 km, encompassed at least eight oppida situated along river and road routes. The Fossé des Pandours, due to its considerable size, represents one of the largest oppidum in this area.

==== Creation and peak of the oppidum (Late 2nd – 1st Century BC) ====
The term "oppidum" described fortified Celtic settlements that often served as important economic and political centers. While the early protohistoric settlements were relatively small, those constructed during the Gallic period were significantly larger. During the transition between the 3rd and 2nd centuries BC, settlements in the Celtic world, particularly those located along trade routes, experienced a period of growth, with notable developments in Gaul during the 2nd and 1st centuries BC. These settlements are regarded as the "first cities north of the Alps."

The Fossé des Pandours oppidum was probably created ex nihilo, as no evidence of previous Gallic occupation has been found. It dates from the end of the 2nd century BC, with the murus gallicus and other elements discovered dating from this period. It was occupied until the beginning of the Common Era. The excavations suggest a single construction phase following a coherent and planned program. The oppidum covers 170 hectares and is considered by Heitz to be "one of the largest in independent Gaul".

Plan of the Fossé des Pandours oppidum.

The site is a promontory fort. Part of the oppidum is naturally defended by cliffs, but additional fortifications were necessary, leading to the construction of the "Fossé des Pandours", a 600-meter-long and 10-meter-high fortification. The main rampart was complemented by a perimeter wall of about 7 kilometers. This fortification system is typical of the Oppida of the late La Tène period. (Note: Flotté & Fuchs 2001, p. 553)

==== Decline of the Stronghold (Late 1st Century BC) ====
The fortress at the Saverne Pass lost its importance after Ariovistus invaded the region (c. 70 BC) and Julius Caesar's establishment of the Triboci on the Rhine plain (after 58 BC), although the site remained under the control of the Mediomatrici until Augustus reorganized Gaul. A possible sign of the site's decline is the lack of restoration of the murus gallicus, which normally requires repair or rebuilding every 30 years. The site probably lost its rank after the Gallic Wars.

Archaeologists have found artifacts from the late La Tène period on the Baerenkupfel. This Baerenkupel wall was built later, during a phase of settlement contraction to the two peaks of Barbarakopf and Baerenkupfel, leaving Koepfel outside the main enclosure.

According to Fichtl, the capital of the Mediomatrici shifted westwards from the middle of the 1st century BC. In Roman Gaul, the main axis of circulation became the Rhône-Saône-Moselle line, and the strongholds on this axis were strengthened, while those on the old west-east axis declined. However, this hypothesis is very controversial and is not accepted by many scientists.

==== Postal relay on the Argentoratum-Divodurum Route (1st and 2nd Centuries AD) ====
The site remained occupied throughout the 1st century, but no longer had a significant political or economic role.

It was crossed by the Roman road from Strasbourg to Metz and a road relay (at the site of Uspann) was set up to provide travelers with fresh horses. The exact size of the site is unknown as it was partially destroyed during 18th-century road works and partial excavations. The Uspann site was abandoned in the late 2nd or early 3rd century.

A necropolis and sandstone quarries bear witness to the continued occupation and exploitation of the site. The sandstone quarry may have been in use during the Gallic period, but there is no evidence of this. The necropolis, dating from the second half of the 2nd and early 3rd centuries, yielded 17 burials and a house-shaped stele. In the Celtic world, necropolises were located outside oppida and along roads, similar to the Roman civilization.

=== Site history since the Middle Ages ===
==== Medieval and modern periods ====
Restorations and modifications may have taken place in the 9th and 10th centuries; in particular, the two sections of the wall between Baerenkupfel and Koepfel are thought to date from this period, according to the Mérimée database. Fichtl does not give a date.

The construction of the royal road from Paris to Strasbourg between 1730 and 1737 led to the destruction of about 150 meters of the rampart.

During the War of the Austrian Succession (1740–1744), mercenaries in the service of Austria under Maria Theresa - Hungarians or Croats, according to Heitz - occupied the site for a time in 1744 and gave it their name, Pandours. They also left other traces of their stay, including place names and legends.

==== Archaeological research in the 20th century ====
Despite being identified by Forrer as early as 1926, the site was "long neglected." The site was ultimately incorporated into the supplementary inventory in 1989.

The initial archaeological works date from the early 20th century, yet they remained superficial. The second half of the century saw a greater level of activity, with intermittent excavations of the Uspann road station from 1949 to 1993 and excavations of Gallo-Roman tombs in 1980.

Excavations of the oppidum commenced in 1995 as part of a field school directed by the archaeology department of the University of Strasbourg. The Fossé des Pandours wall was excavated between 1995 and 1999, and the Barbarakopf habitation was excavated in 2000 and 2001, uncovering a craft area. (Note: Flotté & Fuchs 2001, p. 552) After the 2003 publication, excavations continued, and various operations benefited from skidding work or the creation of forest tracks.

== Description of the site ==
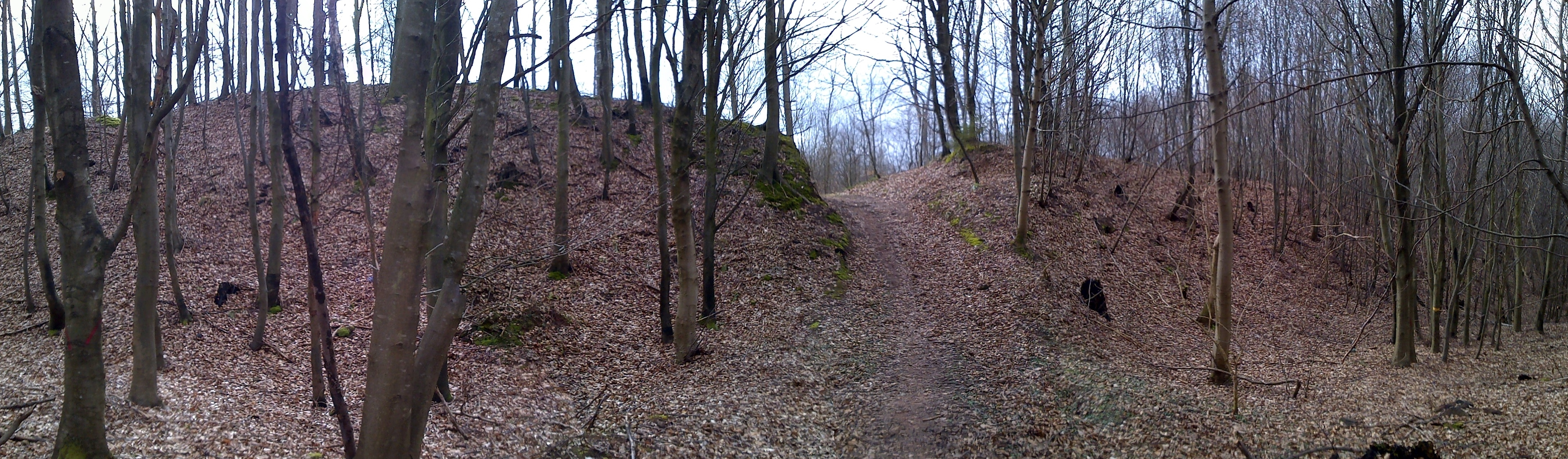
Pandour ditch.

In addition to utilizing topography, Oppida constructed supplementary defensive structures for their late fortifications. The Oppidum covers an area of 160 to 165 hectares. To address the absence of uninterrupted natural protection, in addition to the 600-meter-long barrier rampart that obstructs access from the north via the Lorraine plateau, ramparts were constructed, collectively measuring approximately 7 kilometers in length and encompassing the entire site.

=== Fossé des Pandours ===
The archaeological excavations yielded a murus gallicus from the La Tène period, specifically period D1, dated to approximately 100 BC. This was based on the findings from the 1995 and 1996 excavation campaigns. A single construction phase has been identified, accompanied by substantial preliminary earthworks. Such buildings were pervasive throughout Gaul and were chronicled by Caesar in Commentaries on the Gallic War. The ramparts are described as "wood architecture", not dry stone, wherein the stones had no structural function and served merely as cladding.

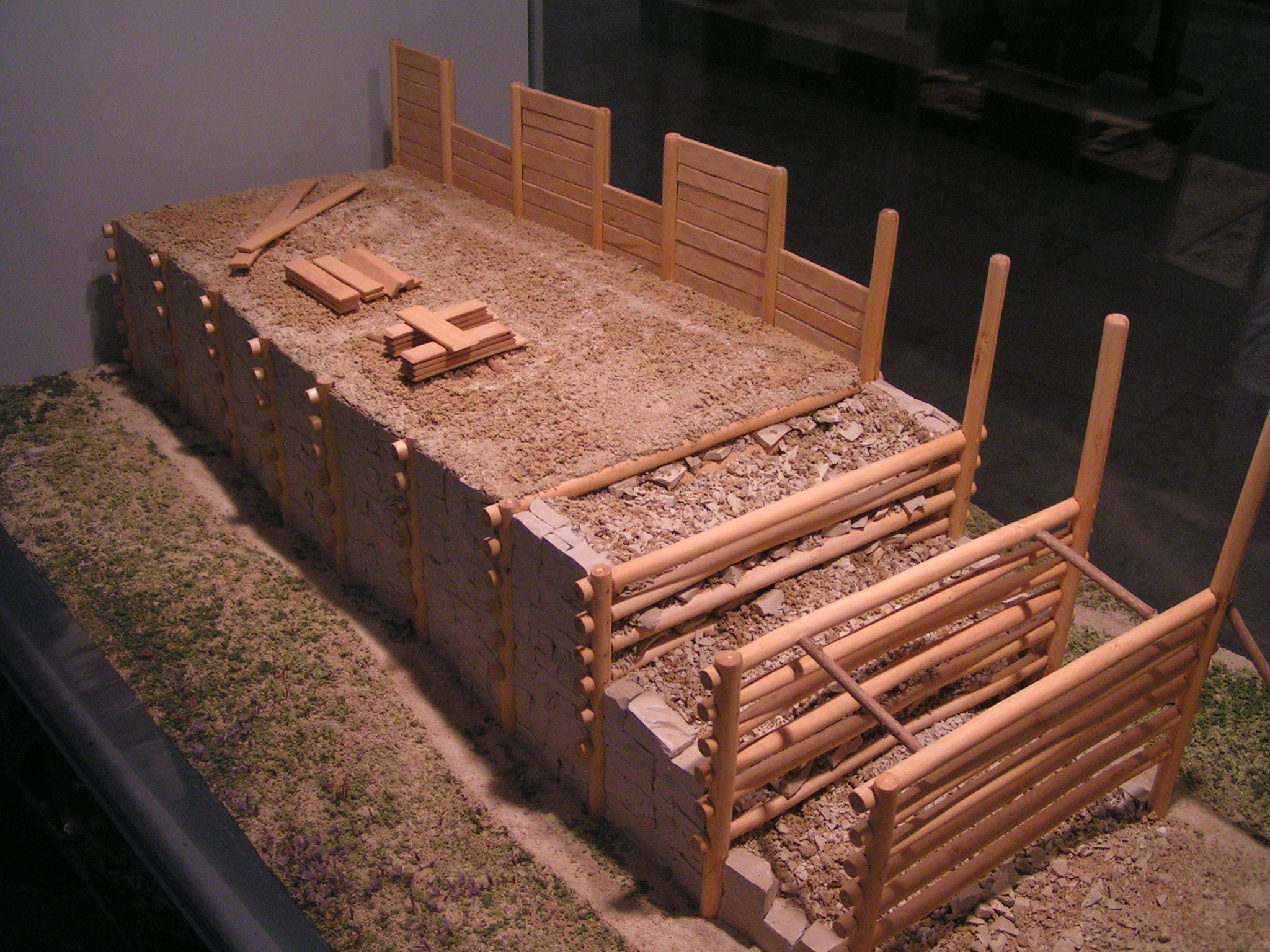
Internal structure of a murus gallicus.

The beams were embedded in sand and fastened with iron, and the entire structure was faced with pink sandstone. The rampart, measuring approximately 12 to 13 meters in width at its base, was faced with sandstone, which was preserved at a height of 1 meter. This refined facing is a distinctive feature of the Alsace site, as stones are typically laid in dry-stone construction and are not carved. The stones forming the base of the structure were larger than those used in the upper levels. An internal framework provided stability to the wall and situated behind the rampart was an earth embankment and a filled-in ditch. The preceding earthworks were extensive, with beams measuring 2 to 4 meters in length, fitted with nails measuring 0.16 to 0.32 meters in length, and stones filling the gaps. The intersecting beams provided lateral stability to the wall, with a height of approximately 60 to 70 cm at the base and reaching up to 5 to 6 meters, with the beams spaced 1.50 to 1.60 m apart. The pink sandstone cladding protected the wooden structure, although the ends of the perpendicular beams were initially visible. The rear of the rampart featured a ramp.

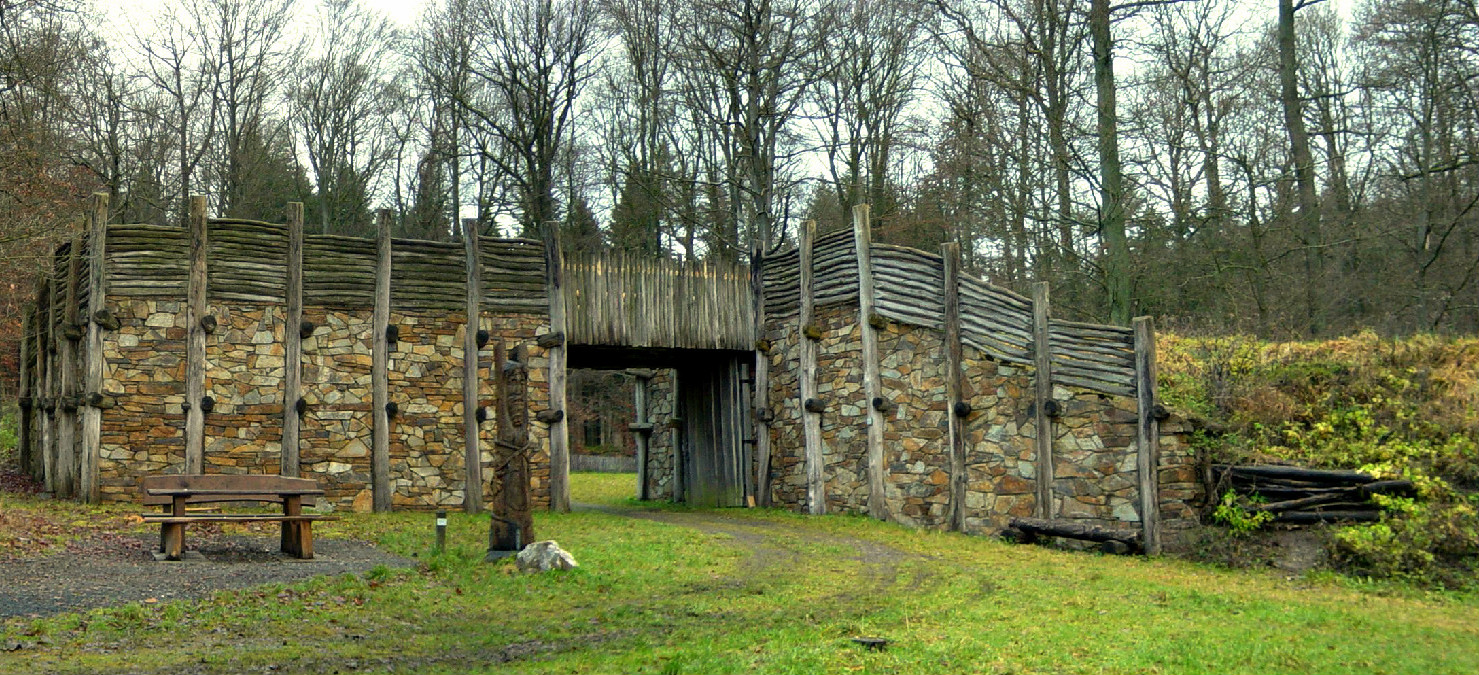
Example of the reconstruction of a pincer gate in Dünsberg, Germany.

The exterior of the fortification was equipped with a 12-meter glacis, which preceded a ditch measuring between four and seven meters in width. The interior of the fortress featured a 10-meter-wide sand embankment. The murus gallicus structure was approximately 40 meters in width and 10 meters in height. The structure bears a resemblance to that of the wall at Alesia. Excavations conducted in the Barbarakopf region have revealed that the clay soil was reinforced with stones to support the weight of the rampart, indicating the involvement of "significant earthworks." Excavations on the northern slope of Kaestenberg have uncovered a rampart, despite its poor condition, measuring approximately 1.50 m in width. The sand fill has been observed to include beams fastened with nails, suggesting that these additions were introduced to stabilize the rampart.

=== Inner ramparts ===
Three additional ramparts are present on the site. Two modest, parallel inner ramparts were identified, situated between the heights of Baerenkupfel and Koepfel. However, these are not from the Gallic period, according to Fichtl. While the precise date is not specified, it is evident that this is a later construction, postdating the 3rd century.

The Baerenkupfel rampart was partially excavated. The posts were spaced at intervals of between four and five meters, and horizontal beams were probably used to supplement them, in contrast to the other ramparts. Furthermore, this rampart was devoid of embankments. The structure of the rampart was relatively simple, consisting of a ramp constructed of sand layers, with stones at the front measuring approximately one meter in width and a stone facing, and unaligned stone slabs at the rear.

The wall elements of the Fossé des Pandours exhibit a number of shared characteristics. Archaeological excavations have revealed that the bases of the facing were not designed with a focus on achieving horizontality. Instead, the facing was carefully cut on its front side.

=== Gates and outer rampart ===
It is characteristic of public monuments of oppida to display "external monumentality", as evidenced by the presence of gates and ramparts. Such structures were not the sole components of these settlements. In addition to these external features, buildings serving political, economic, and religious purposes may also have been present.

The outer rampart of the oppidum at Fossé des Pandours is the least well-documented. While it was constructed using the murus gallicus method, its height was lower and it was built with fewer resources, including fewer nails and a stone facing that was not as well-finished. The construction used the terrain's slope and sandstone cliffs and was not continuous. At times, the rampart was built along the terrain's contours, and at other times, it was constructed "down the slope" with a gradient. This rampart had "low defensive value", its importance being more closely related to the "monumentalization of a symbolic boundary between the rural outside and the urban inside of the oppidum."

The whereabouts of the fortress gates are currently unknown. However, archaeologists have been able to hypothesize their locations by studying the road network.

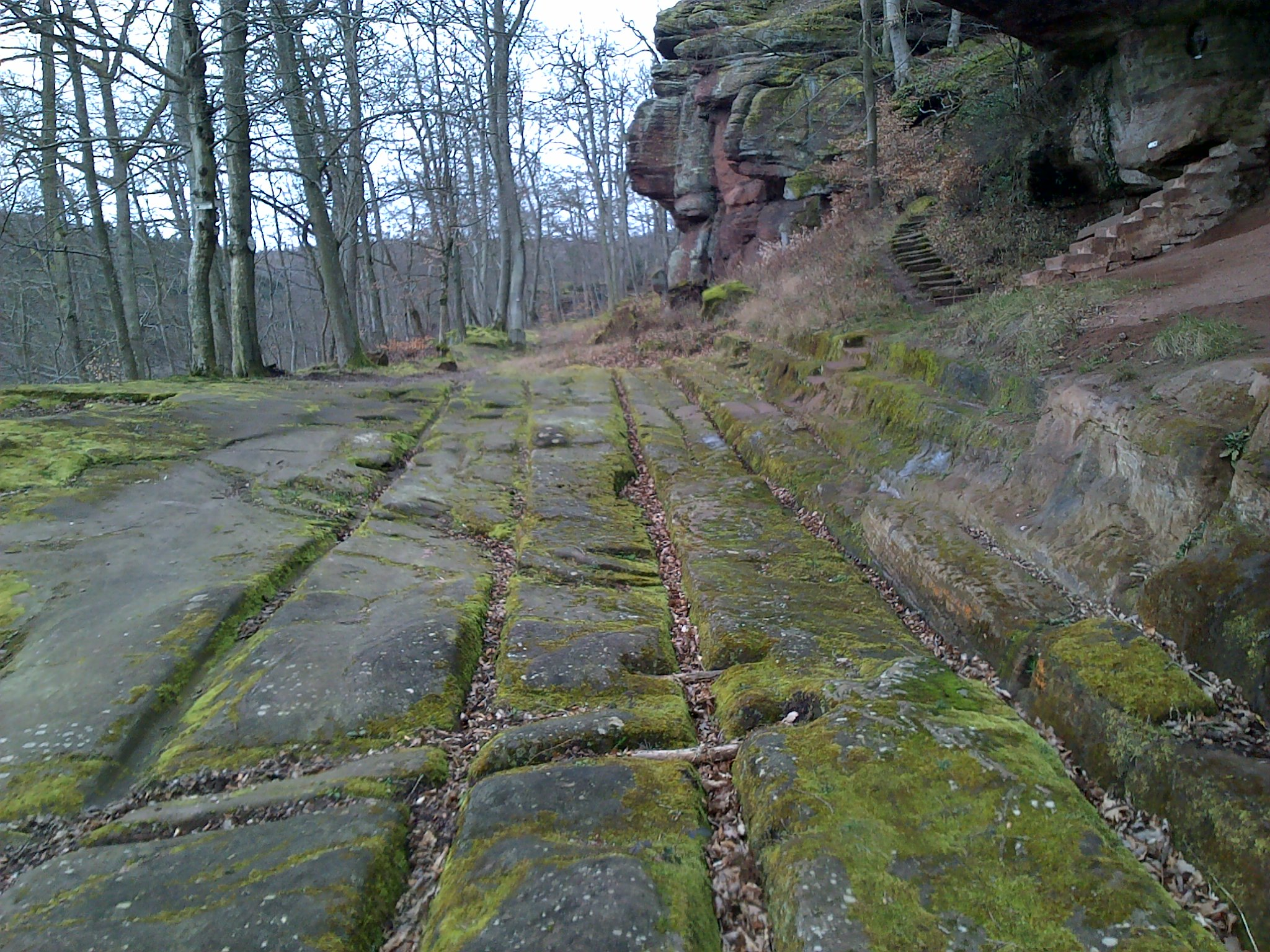
Bishops' road ruts.

An older road, which preceded the 18th-century route and is known as "Route des évêques", is characterized by the presence of ruts in the ground and its proximity to the "saut du prince Charles." Fichtl posits that the layout of the road likely dates back to the Gallic period. He hypothesizes that the ancient roads followed the path of the road that crosses the Fossé des Pandours slightly west of the current national road 4, and thus, according to him, this was where the main gate of the oppidum was located. However, it is unlikely that the southern gate in its Gallic form will be found, as evidence shows that explosives have been used in previous excavations.

The gate was an "obligatory passage point", and like those identified in other Gallic fortresses, it likely had a long corridor and a gatehouse tower, which served to emphasize the desired display of power. The monumental gates of oppida had upper floors and gate systems intended for visitors, serving as an antechamber. These sites also had more modest gates. While the walls may have been equipped with "walkways" on top, these are difficult to detect due to the destruction of the upper parts of the ramparts or towers built on beams atop the murus gallicus.

=== Habitat and craftsmanship ===
The internal organization of oppida into specific quarters has been a topic of scholarly interest since the early nineteenth century.

Excavations in residential areas have yielded significant findings, particularly in the Barbarakopf area. The settlement is characterized by a "loosely spaced" arrangement of structures, with some areas remaining unoccupied. This spatial organization aligns with patterns observed in numerous other excavated sites. The uncovered houses were constructed using either posts or plates.

Two wells were excavated, one of which yielded millstones, tools including a mallet, and various objects such as a furniture leg. The excavation of the well also revealed the presence of broken amphorae and coinage, which suggests that the site served as a "commercial hub" and that a mint workshop was in operation there.

The necropolises were situated in a location external to the oppidum, in close proximity to the entrance gates.

== Fossé des Pandours: An important site with urban functions ==
Oppida fulfilled a variety of roles, including those pertaining to politics, economics, and religion.

=== Site open to trade and craft activity ===
Oppida were centers for commerce and supply. Despite the incomplete nature of the excavations, they indicate that the site was open to distant trade from the Mediterranean. The site is on an east-west axis dating back to the protohistory era. The construction techniques utilized at Fossé des Pandours may have served as a model for the oppidum at Manching, located in present-day Bavaria.

Archaeological evidence indicates that imports, particularly wine, were a significant aspect of the material culture of the region. The excavation of a small area yielded approximately a hundred amphorae, which provided insight into the importation of wine. Additionally, bronze utensils and Campanian pottery shards suggest other goods importation.

It is plausible that the Mediomatrici exported salt, which had been a valuable commodity for centuries due to its extraction from the saline springs in the Seille Valley.

The region had established privileged trade links with southern Germany. The major sites in southern Germany collapsed in the second quarter of the 1st century BC, which may have affected the dynamism of the Fossé des Pandours oppidum.

Archaeological investigations have yielded the discovery of mills, fibulae, wooden and metal objects, as well as bronze and iron items, within the confines of wells. The archaeological investigation also revealed the existence of workshops, along with many products that were either incomplete or exhibited manufacturing defects. Of particular interest were low-value coins, known as "potins", which were decorated with a boar and minted on-site. These potins were cast in strings and manually separated. In addition to potins, the workshops produced a range of other products, including iron, bronze, glass, ceramics, wood, leather, and bone items. Most products were located along roads, which provided convenient access to materials and facilitated sales to visitors and potential customers.

=== Site with political, symbolic, and ostentatious functions ===
Oppida were centers of power where major community decisions were made. They featured public spaces similar in design to those found in Greek agoras or Roman forums.

The fortifications served a defensive purpose, though not to the exclusion of other roles. Many of the sites were naturally protected, which further reduced the importance of the fortifications in this regard. The defense of such vast territories was inherently challenging, requiring a considerable number of defenders. This is why Caesar was able to capture numerous fortresses with relative ease. The fortifications also reflected a "genuine desire for prestige and power." In these structures, aesthetic considerations were of greater importance than the architectural or military elements. For instance, the stone blocks used in the construction of the walls were finely worked on the side facing the main gate, while the workmanship on less visible parts of the wall was "much cruder."

The considerable dimensions of the fortress, the evidence of a mint, and the quality of the wall's construction indicate that this was a prominent oppidum within the Mediomatrici region.

In addition to its defensive and strategic functions, the fortress served a symbolic and ostentatious purpose, which was of paramount importance at the Saverne Pass due to the site's considerable length and the inherent difficulties associated with its defense. The lack of wooded areas would have accentuated the fortress's ostentatious character, particularly given the finely carved external stone blocks. The wall also served as a symbolic boundary between rural and urban spaces, illustrating the "symbolic idea of passing between two worlds." It marked a boundary "between the urban world of the oppidum and the surrounding rural world", similar to the "pomerium" of Etruscan and Roman cities, with associated legal and religious rules. The symbolic function thus outweighed the other roles attributed to it.

== See also ==
- History of Alsace
- European Archaeological Park of Bliesbruck-Reinheim

== Bibliography ==
=== General works ===
- Châtelet, Madeleine (2009). Fouilles et Découvertes en Alsace [Excavations and Discoveries in Alsace] (in French). Rennes: Ouest-France. ISBN 9782737347658.
- Fichtl, Stephan (2005). "Murus et pomerium : réflexions sur la fonction des remparts protohistoriques" [Murus and pomerium: reflections on the function of protohistoric ramparts]. Revue archéologique du centre de la France (in French) (44): 55–72.
- Fichtl, Stephan (2010). "Oppidum". L'Archéologue (in French) (108): 12–17.
- Fichtl, Stephan (2010b). "Architecture et fonctions des remparts celtiques" [Architecture and functions of Celtic ramparts]. L'Archéologue (in French) (108): 18–25.
- Flotté, Pascal; Fuchs, Matthieu (2001). Le Bas-Rhin [Lower Rhine]. Carte archéologique de la Gaule (in French).
- Kruta, Venceslas (2001). Les Celtes histoire et dictionnaire : Des origines à la romanisation et au christianisme [Celtic history and dictionary: From the origins to Romanization and Christianity]. Bouquins (in French). Paris: Robert Laffont. ISBN 978-2-221-05690-5.
- Moscati, Sabatino (2001). Les Celtes [exposition, Venise, Palazzo Grassi, 1991] [The Celts [exhibition, Venice, Palazzo Grassi, 1991]] (in French). Paris: EDDL. ISBN 2-237-00484-6.
- Schnitzler, Bernadette (1992). L'Alsace archéologique [Archaeological Alsace] (in French). Strasbourg: La Nuée Bleue. ISBN 978-2-7165-0215-3.

=== Works about the oppidum or Saverne ===
- Bonaventure, Bertrand (2012). "Quelques ensembles de mobilier de l'oppidum du fossé des Pandours (Col de Saverne, Bas Rhin) contribution à la chronologie du site" [Some furniture from the Pandours ditch oppidum (Col de Saverne, Bas Rhin) - a contribution to the chronology of the site]. Regards sur la chronologie de la fin de l'âge du Fer (iiie-ier siècle avant J.-C.) en Gaule non méditerranéenne. Actes de la table ronde tenue à Bibracte « Chronologie de la fin de l'âge du Fer (iiie-ier siècle avant J.-C.) dans l'est de la France et les régions voisines », Glux-en-Glenne, 15-17 octobre 2007 [Insights into the chronology of the end of the Iron Age (3rd-1st century BC) in non-Mediterranean Gaul. Proceedings of the round table held at Bibracte "Chronology of the end of the Iron Age (3rd-1st century BC) in eastern France and neighboring regions", Glux-en-Glenne, October 15–17, 2007] (in French). Bibracte. ISBN 9782909668741.
- Bouillet, Jean; Bubendorff, Fabien (2003). "Saverne dans le contexte géologique de l'Alsace" [Saverne in the geological context of Alsace]. Saverne dans l'Antiquité [Saverne in Antiquity] (in French). Saverne. pp. 6–8.
- Dusseaux, Diane; Petit, Jean-Paul (2015). Livret exposition 2015 Exposition Trésors des Médiomatriques [2015 Exhibition booklet Mediomatric Treasures exhibition] (in French). Conseil Départemental de Moselle.
- Féliu, Clément (2010). "Quelques observations architecturales sur les remparts de contour de l'oppidum du Fossé des Pandours au Col de Saverne (67)" [Some architectural observations on the surrounding ramparts of the Fossé des Pandours oppidum at Col de Saverne (67)]. Murus celticus. Architecture et fonctions des remparts de l'âge du Fer [Murus celticus. Architecture and functions of Iron Age ramparts] (in French). Bibracte. pp. 77–84.
- Fichtl, Stephan (1996). "L'oppidum gaulois du Fossé des Pandours au col de Saverne (Bas-Rhin)" [The Gaulish oppidum of the Fossé des Pandours on the Col de Saverne (Bas-Rhin)]. Pays d'Alsace, archéologie (in French) (177–4). SHASE: 3–4.
- Fichtl, Stephan (1997). "Le Murus Gallicus de l'oppidum médiomatrique du Fossé des Pandours (col de Saverne, Bas-Rhin), fouilles 1995-1996" [The Murus Gallicus of the Fossé des Pandours medio-matric oppidum (Col de Saverne, Bas-Rhin), excavated 1995-1996]. Cahiers alsaciens d'archéologie, d'art et d'histoire (in French) (XL): 35–56.
- Fichtl, Stephan (2003). "Le fossé des Pandours, un oppidum médiomatrique au col de Saverne (Saverne, Bas-Rhin) : état de la question en 1996" [Le fossé des Pandours, un oppidum médiomatrique au col de Saverne (Saverne, Bas-Rhin): state of the question in 1996]. Habitats, mobiliers et groupes régionaux à l'âge du fer [Habitats, furniture and regional groups in the Iron Age] (in French). Colmar-Mittelwihr.
- Fichtl, Stephan (2003a). "L'oppidum du Fossé des Pandours, capitale gauloise des Médiomatriques" [The oppidum of the Fossé des Pandours, Gallic capital of the Mediomatrici]. Saverne dans l'Antiquité [Saverne in Antiquity] (in French). Saverne. pp. 15–38.
- Fichtl, Stephan (2004). "Deux puits sur l'oppidum gaulois du col de Saverne (Bas-Rhin)" [Two wells on the Gallic oppidum of Col de Saverne (Bas-Rhin)]. Dossiers d'archéologie (in French) (295): 82–87.
- Fichtl, Stephan (2010a). "L'architecture murus gallicus de l'oppidum du Fossé des Pandours au col de Saverne (Bas-Rhin)" [The murus gallicus architecture of the Fossé des Pandours oppidum on the Saverne Pass (Bas-Rhin)]. Murus celticus. Architecture et fonctions des remparts de l'âge du Fer [Murus celticus. Architecture and functions of Iron Age ramparts] (in French). Bibracte. pp. 85–91.
- Fichtl, Stephan (1997). "Le murus gallicus de l'oppidum médiomatrique du Fossé des Pandours (col de Saverne, Bas-Rhin)" [The murus gallicus of the Fossé des Pandours mid-medieval oppidum (Col de Saverne, Bas-Rhin)]. Cahiers alsaciens d'archéologie, d'art et d'histoire (in French) (40): 33–5.
- Fichtl, Stephan; Adam, Anne-Marie; Feliu, Clément; Pierrevelcin, Gilles; Bonaventure, Bertrand (2004). L'oppidum médiomatrique du Fossé des Pandours au Col de Saverne (Bas-Rhin) [The Fossé des Pandours medio-matric oppidum on the Col de Saverne (Bas-Rhin)] (in French). Université Marc Bloch.
- Heitz, Henri (2003). "Les paysages du site de Saverne" [Landscapes of the Saverne site]. Saverne dans l'Antiquité [Saverne in Antiquity] (in French). Saverne. pp. 3–5.
- Heitz, Henri (2003a). "Historiens et archéologues au service de l'histoire de Saverne" [Historians and archaeologists at the service of Saverne's history]. Saverne dans l'Antiquité [Saverne in Antiquity] (in French). Saverne. pp. 9–14.
- Heitz, Henri (1999). La Côte et le Col de Saverne : promenades historiques et archéologiques autour de Saverne [La Côte et le Col de Saverne: historical and archaeological walks around Saverne] (in French). Saverne: SHASE.
- Heitz, Henri (2012). Pour découvrir l'histoire de Saverne [Discover the history of Saverne] (in French). Saverne: SHASE. ISBN 978-2-36329-025-0.
- Lafon, Xavier (1990). "Recherches en cours au col de Saverne : la statio gallo-romaine de l'Uspann" [Ongoing research at Col de Saverne: the Gallo-Roman Uspann statio]. Pays d'Alsace, archéologie (in French) (153–4). SHASE: 20–30.
- Lévy, Georges (1990). "Deux siècles d'archéologie antique dans l'arrondissement de Saverne" [Two centuries of ancient archaeology in the Saverne district]. Pays d'Alsace - Archéologie (in French) (153): 3–19.
