= Pandur (disambiguation) =

Pandurs were light infantry military units in the Kingdom of Hungary.

Pandur or Pandour may also refer to:

Armoured personnel carriers

- Pandur I
- Pandur II
- Pandur Evo MTPz

Ships

- French cutter Pandour (1780), renamed HMS Pandora
- French brig Pandour (1804)
- HMS Pandour, several ships
- SMS Pandur, Huszár-class destroyer of Austria-Hungary

People

- Ivor Pandur (born 2000), Croatian professional footballer
- Tomaž Pandur (1963 – 2016). Slovenian theatre director

Other

- Pandours, members of Pandour Corps in the Dutch Cape Colony

== See also ==
- Pandoer, card game
- Pandura/Panduri/Phandar, plucked musical instrument
- Panduru (disambiguation)
