= History of Alsace =

Coordinates: 48°30′N 7°30′E

The history of Alsace has been influenced by the Rhine and its tributaries, a favorable climate, fertile loess soils, and the region's relative accessibility through and around the Vosges. It was first inhabited by early modern humans during the Paleolithic. Peoples speaking Celtic and Germanic languages occupied the region prior to its conquest by Roman armies under the command of Julius Caesar. In the centuries after the fall of Rome the area acquired its name and identity as an early medieval pagus. Since then, suzerainty and effective control have shifted among competing European powers, including the Kingdom of Alamannia, the Frankish Empire, Lotharingia, the Holy Roman Empire, France, and the German Empire. Alsace has remained part of France since the end of the Second World War.

== Paleolithic and Mesolithic Alsace ==
The earliest evidence of hominids in Alsace dates to 700,000 BP. Neanderthals were established in the region by 250,000 BP. Important Neanderthal archaeological sites are found near the town of Mutzig west of Strasbourg and elsewhere in the valley of the Bruche.

By 35,000 BP Aurignacian remains at Achenheim and Entzheim indicate the arrival of early European modern humans.

The Mannlefelsen cave near Oberlarg in southern Alsace contain substantial traces of occupation dating from 13,000 BP (late Upper Paleolithic) to as late as 5,500 BP (end of Mesolithic). Upper Paleolithic remains at Mannlefelsen include stone scrapers, chisels, projectile weapons, and evidence of a tent site. Later Mesolithic remains include more finely shaped microliths used for arrowheads, as well as an intentionally severed head, similar to others found in Bavaria. Red deer, boar, auroch, and roe deer remains are also present, consistent with the post-glacial afforestation of central Europe.

== Neolithic Alsace ==
By 5300 BCE Neolithic farming cultures were established in Alsace, particularly on the light and fertile loess soils between the river Ill to the east and the Vosges to the west. In Alsace evidence has been found for the cultivation of einkorn and emmer wheats, barley, and vetch; the raising of cows, pigs and sheep; and transhumance: all typical of the Neolithic in Europe generally. Technologies include polished stone tools used to clear forests and cultivate the soil, pottery, and leather goods.

The Neolithic in Alsace has been divided by archaeologists into four distinct periods: Linear Pottery Culture, or LBK (5300 BCE - 4900 BCE); middle Neolithic (4900 BCE - 4200 BCE); recent Neolithic (4200 BCE - 3500 BCE); and a final, relatively obscure period with only spotty archaeological remains (3500 BCE - 2200 BCE).

LBK culture is distinguished by pottery with distinctive linear designs and by large timber longhouses. LBK spread to Alsace, along with much of the rest of central Europe, from the Danube and Hungarian plain. Archaeological remains suggest two distinct waves of settlement in Alsace, with northern Alsace having been colonized by farmers from near the rivers Main and Neckar, and southern Alsace being culturally closer to the upper reaches of the Danube in Switzerland. LBK cultures likely coexisted with earlier hunter-gatherer cultures, which survived in mountain refugia in the Vosges.

The middle Neolithic shares much in common with LBK, at least as demonstrated by burial practices. Longhouses, however, disappear, and little is known of middle Neolithic residential structures.

Around 4200 BCE archaeological remains suggest the occurrence of a more significant cultural break, in particular in the north of Alsace in the form of the Michelsberg culture. Genetic and archaeological evidence suggests the movement of peoples from the Parisian basin in the west eastwards to Alsace and Germany, possibly accompanied by violence. Genetic testing of skeletons near Gougenheim suggests that the invaders carried with them a significant admixture of European hunter-gatherer ancestry, distinguishing them from the LBK-derived neolithic peoples previously established in Alsace. At Bergheim, a mass grave contains the remains of a group of these western invaders. Their skeletons show signs of having been violently killed. Ultimately, however, the Michelsberg peoples established themselves in much of Alsace, replacing the earlier LBK derived groups.

== Bronze Age Alsace ==
Bronze Age Alsace (2200 BCE - 800 BCE) is characterized by the appearance of tumulus graves and hilltop fortifications as well as widespread use of bronze. Otherwise the archaeological record suggests considerable regional and temporal variety, as well as several significant social, economic and political transitions.

The very beginnings of Bronze Age Alsace, around 2200 BCE, occurred within the context of Bell Beaker culture, itself a complex cultural phenomenon emerging out of western Europe. Bell Beaker remains in Alsace include characteristic bell-shaped pottery and underground inhumations with no mound or tumulus above. Bell Beaker sites have been found near Achenheim and Kunheim, among other locations.

After 2200 BCE, Bell Beaker remains become less common, and inhumations with mounds or tumuli above them, associated with Tumulus Culture of the Middle Bronze Age in north-central Europe, take their place. This and other earlier tumulus cultures emerging out of Central and Eastern Europe, such as Corded Ware Culture and Yamnaya Culture, are associated by some paleontologists with the migration of Indo-European speakers from the steppes of eastern Europe to the forests of central Europe. From Proto-Indo-European would eventually emerge the Continental Celtic spoken in much of Gaul. In Alsace, important examples of tumulus graves from this period can be found in the forest of Haguenau.

After a brief cool period between 1600 BCE and 1400 BCE, the number of known settlements and burial sites in Alsace increases significantly. This period belongs largely to the Urnfield Culture, characterized by cremated remains in pots buried together in fields. Notable during this period is a range of settlement sizes, which suggest to archaeologists the formation of political units in which smaller settlements were subject to larger ones. Large late Bronze Age settlements have been found near Reichstett and Colmar.

== Iron Age Alsace ==
The Iron Age in Alsace (800 BCE - 52 BCE) begins with the advent of iron metallurgy and ends with the incorporation of all of Gaul into Rome. In Alsace, in common with much of central Europe, two phases of this period have been identified by archaeologists: the Hallstatt (800 BCE - 480 BCE) and La Tène (480 BCE - 52 BCE).

The Hallstatt is characterized by an increased differentiation in wealth and power among settlements and individuals, continuing trends from the late Bronze Age. Increased exchange of goods and ideas with Mediterranean regions and elsewhere appears to have encouraged the development of a wealthy elite, or "Hallstatt aristocracy," in a zone extending from central France, through Alsace, to Hungary and Bohemia. Cultural practices of this aristocracy, so far as the archaeological remains demonstrate, appear to have included horsemanship, the accumulation and display of highly decorated weapons and other fine goods, and the drinking of imported wine with the paraphernalia of the Greek symposium.

In Alsace, the hill fort Britzgyberg, near Illfurth, is the most important aristocratic center of the Hallstatt. It is situated in the pass between the Rhine valley and Burgundy, and Greek pottery and other luxury imports have been found there. Also in Alsace are several elite Hallstatt tombs, whose contents may include torcs, pins, armbands and other jewelry, decorated swords, and horse trappings, depending on the status and occupation of the individual. The very richest tombs include an entire funerary cart, as at Hatten and Ensisheim, or abundant quantities of elaborate gold jewelry, as for a young woman buried near Nordhouse.

Away from the aristocratic centers are small farming communities situated in a variety of ecosystems, including wetlands, confirming the spread of agriculture well beyond the fertile loess soils that had first attracted farmers to the area.

During the end of the Halstatt and beginnings of the La Tène, the centres of Celtic power and production in central Europe generally moved northwards. However, Alsace and the middle Rhine, unlike other centres of Hallstatt power, show a great deal of continuity from one period to the next, as demonstrated by continuity in burial practices and the uninterrupted occupation of Britzgyberg.

Later, during the second and first centuries BCE, large fortified settlements appear throughout central Europe, including in Alsace and surrounding areas. These settlements are generally referred to as oppida both by contemporary observers and modern historians. The larger of these settlements may be distinguished from Hallstatt hill forts by their size, their less uniform association with centers of elite power and accumulation, and the form of defensive walls that surrounded them. The largest oppidum in Alsace from this period is the Oppidum du Fossé des Pandours, northwest of modern Strasbourg, in what was the territory of the Mediomadrici.

== Roman Alsace ==
By 100 BCE Germanic peoples had begun to settle areas along the upper Rhine and Danube long occupied by Celtic speaking Gauls. By no later than the first half of the first century BCE, much of Alsace was occupied by the Triboci, a Germanic tribe.

Rome conquered Alsace in the early stages of the Gallic Wars. In 58 BCE, the Aedui, a Gallic tribe located to the southwest of Alsace, appealed to the Roman Senate for aid against the Suebi, a Germanic tribe located principally to the east of the Rhine. The Suebi had united with other Germanic tribes under their chieftain Ariovistus, and had asserted control, through conquest, migration, and alliances, in territories within Gaul itself. Julius Caesar, fresh from victory against the Helvetii, by his own account attempted to negotiate with Ariovistus, but the Suebian leader refused to make the concessions Caesar demanded. A battle broke out at the foot of the Vosges near Cernay in southern Alsace. Caesar routed the Suebi, and Ariovistus fled east. There followed a "long period of security ... for the Gauls along the middle and upper Rhine."

From the first century CE to the early fifth century CE Alsace was incorporated into the Roman province of Germania Superior, formally established in 85 CE. The portion of the Rhine flowing along the eastern boundary of Alsace was also the Roman frontier, or limes, from 53 BCE to approximately 70 CE, and again from approximately 250 CE to before the fall of the Empire in the fifth century. Throughout the Roman period Argentoratum (Strasbourg) was a major Roman military camp. Roman installations, including a major fortress from about 365 CE, were also located near Biesheim on the Rhine when it formed part of the frontier.

Alsace was administered from three cities, or civitates. These were, initially, Brocomagus (Brumath in Alsace), Divodorum (Metz in Lorraine), and Augusta Raurica (near Basel in Switzerland). The administrative role of Brocumagus was eventually taken over by Argentoratum. Otherwise urbanization and population growth was marked the Roman period, likely reaching its greatest extent in the second century, and remaining significant until the middle of the fourth century. Urban buildings appear largely to have been half-timbered, as opposed to the predominantly stone construction in the rest of Gaul, likely due to the lack of accessible bedrock in the valley of the Rhine. In the fourth and fifth centuries, several urban centers were fortified by ramparts, including Brocumagus, Tres Tabernae Cesaris (Saverne) and Argentovaria (Horbourg). In the fifth century urbanization declines rapidly throughout Alsace.

Among food crops the cultivation of cereals predominated. It is assumed by most historians that the Romans introduced viticulture, although evidence for wine growing during the Roman period remains limited. Certainly large quantities of wine, oil, and salted meats were imported from elsewhere in the Roman Empire, most notably from Iberia. Manufacturing centers were also developed, including a steel works close to the military camps at Argentoratum.

== Alemannic and Frankish Alsace ==
=== The Alemanni ===
The Alemanni emerged in the historical record in the third century CE as a confederation of Germanic peoples in what is now southwestern Germany. Throughout late antiquity, they posed a significant threat to the Roman Empire from across the upper Rhine.

In 355 CE, the Alemanni ravaged Argentoratum. In 357 CE, the emperor Julian retook Argentoratum, but by 406, the traditional year given to the so-called crossing of the Rhine by Germanic tribes, Rome appears to have been unable to reassert control over the Rhenish boundary.

The language of the Alemanni is presumed to be the basis of modern-day German dialects spoken along the Upper Rhine and neighboring regions, including Alsatian, Swabian, and Swiss German. The Alemanni remained pagan well into the fifth century.

The Franks to the north of the Alemanni were for a long period of time their principal rivals. In 496 CE, Clovis of the Franks decisively defeated the Alemanni at the Battle of Tolbiac. Alsace became part of the Frankish Kingdom of Austrasia, and remained part of Merovingian and Carolingian Francia until its eventual disintegration after the death of Louis the Pious.

=== Alsace under the Merovingians and Carolingians ===
Under Clovis' Merovingian successors the inhabitants of Alsace were Christianized. Numerous monasteries were founded in this time, both by prominent local families and by Frankish overlords. These monasteries formed important bases of power and wealth for the landowning elites, whose possessions were otherwise subject to the vicissitudes of shifting alliances and constant warfare. The monasteries were also a source of educated clergy, crucial in the administration of a diminished post-Roman world, and valued as such by Frankish kings.

=== Alsace Following the Breakup of the Carolingian Empire ===
From 840, following the death of Louis the Pious, the Carolingian Empire was repeatedly divided and redivided by Charlemagne's descendants into various constituent kingdoms. As a result of these divisions, Alsace was, within the span of thirty years, part of Middle Francia (Treaty of Verdun, 843), the Kingdom of Lotharingia (Treaty of Prum, 855), and East Francia (Treaty of Meerssen, 870).

== Alsace within the Holy Roman Empire ==
At about this time, the surrounding areas experienced recurring fragmentation and reincorporations among a number of feudal secular and ecclesiastical lordships, a common process in the Holy Roman Empire. Alsace experienced great prosperity during the 12th and 13th centuries under Hohenstaufen emperors. Frederick I set up Alsace as a province (a procuratio, not a provincia) to be ruled by ministeriales, a non-noble class of civil servants. The idea was that such men would be more tractable and less likely to alienate the fief from the crown out of their own greed. The province had a single provincial court (Landgericht) and a central administration with its seat at Hagenau. Frederick II designated the Bishop of Strasbourg to administer Alsace, but the authority of the bishop was challenged by Count Rudolf of Habsburg, who received his rights from Frederick II's son Conrad IV. Strasbourg began to grow to become the most populous and commercially important town in the region. In 1262, after a long struggle with the ruling bishops, its citizens gained the status of free imperial city. A stop on the Paris-Vienna-Orient trade route, as well as a port on the Rhine route linking southern Germany and Switzerland to the Netherlands, England and Scandinavia, it became the political and economic center of the region. Cities such as Colmar and Hagenau also began to grow in economic importance and gained a kind of autonomy within the "Decapole" or "Dekapolis", a federation of ten free towns.

As in much of Europe, the prosperity of Alsace came to an end in the 14th century by a series of harsh winters, bad harvests, and the Black Death. These hardships were blamed on Jews, leading to the pogroms of 1336 and 1339. In 1349, Jews of Alsace were accused of poisoning the wells with plague, leading to the massacre of thousands of Jews during the Strasbourg pogrom. Jews were subsequently forbidden to settle in the town. An additional natural disaster was the Rhine rift earthquake of 1356, one of Europe's worst which made ruins of Basel. Prosperity returned to Alsace under Habsburg administration during the Renaissance.

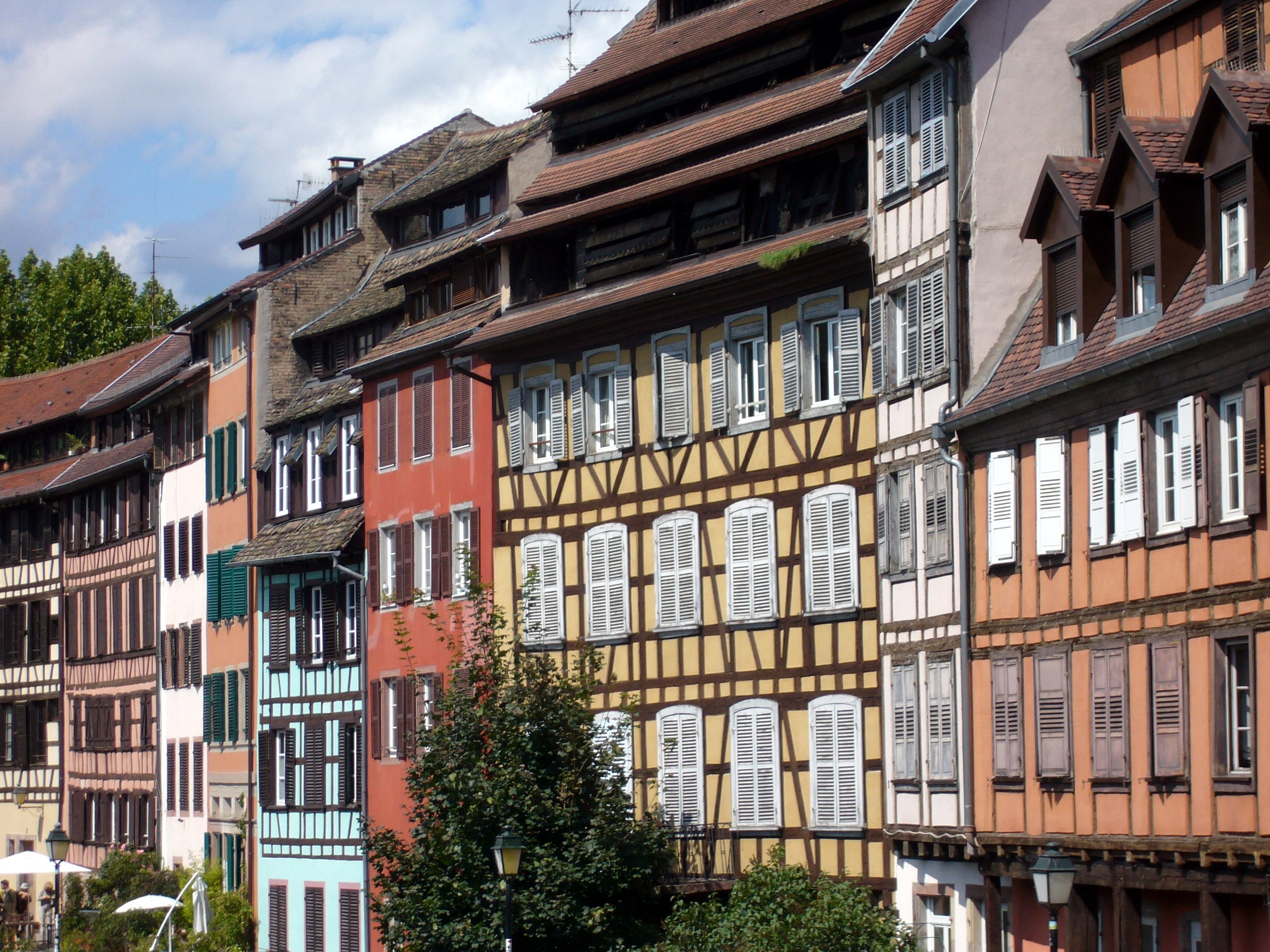
Petite France, Strasbourg

The Holy Roman Empire's central power had begun to decline following years of imperial adventures in Italian lands, often ceding hegemony in Western Europe to France, which had long since centralized power. France began an aggressive policy of expanding eastward, first to the rivers Rhône and Meuse, and when those borders were reached, aiming for the Rhine. In 1299, the French proposed a marriage alliance between Philip IV of France's sister Blanche and Albert I of Germany's son Rudolf, with Alsace to be the dowry; however, the deal never came off. In 1307, the town of Belfort was first chartered by the Counts of Montbéliard. During the next century, France was to be militarily shattered by the Hundred Years' War, which prevented for a time any further tendencies in this direction. After the conclusion of the war, France was again free to pursue its desire to reach the Rhine and in 1444 a French army appeared in Lorraine and Alsace. It took up winter quarters, demanded the submission of Metz and Strasbourg and launched an attack on Basel.

In 1469, following the Treaty of St. Omer, Upper Alsace was sold by Archduke Sigismund of Austria to Charles the Bold, Duke of Burgundy. Although Charles was the nominal landlord, taxes were paid to Frederick III, Holy Roman Emperor. The latter was able to use this tax and a dynastic marriage to his advantage to gain back full control of Upper Alsace (apart from the free towns, but including Belfort) in 1477 when it became part of the demesne of the Habsburg family, who were also rulers of the empire. The town of Mulhouse joined the Swiss Confederation in 1515, where it was to remain until 1798.

By the time of the Protestant Reformation in the 16th century, Strasbourg was a prosperous community, and its inhabitants accepted Protestantism in 1523. Martin Bucer was a prominent Protestant reformer in the region. His efforts were countered by the Roman Catholic Habsburgs who tried to eradicate heresy in Upper Alsace. As a result, Alsace was transformed into a mosaic of Catholic and Protestant territories. On the other hand, Mömpelgard (Montbéliard) to the southwest of Alsace, belonging to the Counts of Württemberg since 1397, remained a Protestant enclave in France until 1793.

== German Land within the Kingdom of France ==
This situation prevailed until 1639, when most of Alsace was conquered by France to keep it out of the hands of the Spanish Habsburgs, who by secret treaty in 1617 had gained a clear road to their valuable and rebellious possessions in the Spanish Netherlands, the Spanish Road. Beset by enemies and seeking to gain a free hand in Hungary, the Habsburgs sold their Sundgau territory (mostly in Upper Alsace) to France in 1646, which had occupied it, for the sum of 1.2 million Thalers. When hostilities were concluded in 1648 with the Treaty of Westphalia, most of Alsace was recognized as part of France, although some towns remained independent. The treaty stipulations regarding Alsace were complex. Although the French king gained sovereignty, existing rights and customs of the inhabitants were largely preserved. France continued to maintain its customs border along the Vosges mountains where it had been, leaving Alsace more economically oriented to neighbouring German-speaking lands. The German language remained in use in local administration, in schools, and at the (Lutheran) University of Strasbourg, which continued to draw students from other German-speaking lands. The 1685 Edict of Fontainebleau, by which the French king ordered the suppression of French Protestantism, was not applied in Alsace. France did endeavour to promote Catholicism. Strasbourg Cathedral, for example, which had been Lutheran from 1524 to 1681, was returned to the Catholic Church. However, compared to the rest of France, Alsace enjoyed a climate of religious tolerance.

The warfare that had partially depopulated the region created opportunities for a stream of immigrants from Switzerland, Germany, Austria, Lorraine, Savoy and other lands that continued until the mid-18th century.

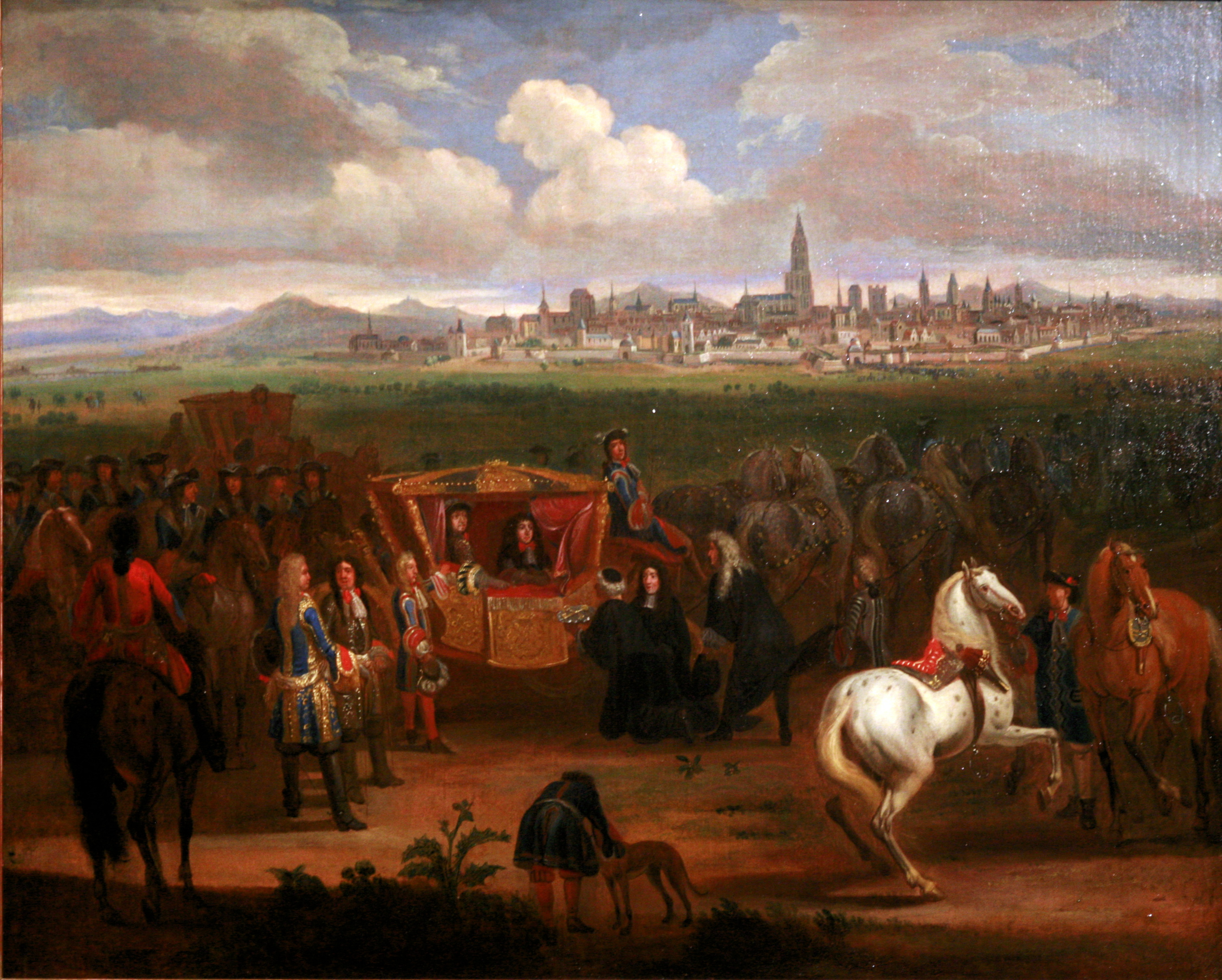
Louis XIV receiving the keys of Strasbourg in 1681

France consolidated its hold with the 1679 Treaties of Nijmegen, which brought most remaining towns under its control. France seized Strasbourg in 1681 in an unprovoked action. These territorial changes were recognised in the 1697 Treaty of Ryswick that ended the War of the Grand Alliance.

== From French Revolution to the Franco-Prussian War ==
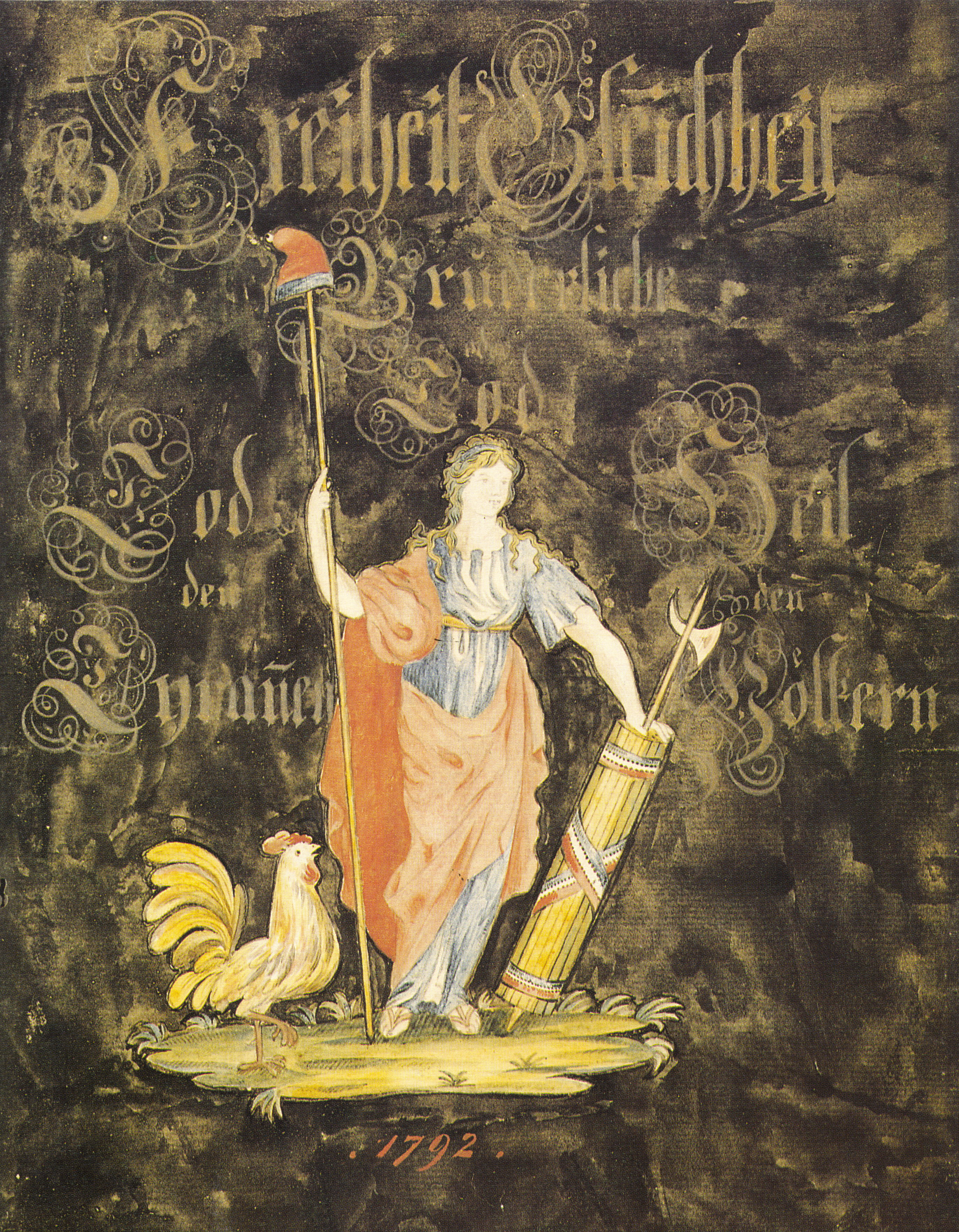
Alsatian sign in German, 1792: Freiheit Gleichheit Brüderlichk. od. Tod (Liberty Equality Fraternity or Death) Tod den Tyranen (Death to Tyrants) Heil den Völkern (Long live the Peoples)

The year 1789 brought the French Revolution and with it the first division of Alsace into the départements of Haut- and Bas-Rhin. Alsatians played an active role in the French Revolution. On 21 July 1789, after receiving news of the Storming of the Bastille in Paris, a crowd of people stormed the Strasbourg city hall, forcing the city administrators to flee and putting symbolically an end to the feudal system in Alsace. In 1792, Rouget de Lisle composed in Strasbourg the Revolutionary marching song "La Marseillaise" (as Marching song for the Army of the Rhine), which later became the anthem of France. "La Marseillaise" was played for the first time in April of that year in front of the mayor of Strasbourg Philippe-Frédéric de Dietrich. Some of the most famous generals of the French Revolution also came from Alsace, notably Kellermann, the victor of Valmy, Kléber, who led the armies of the French Republic in Vendée and Westermann, who also fought in the Vendée.

At the same time, some Alsatians were in opposition to the Jacobins and sympathetic to the restoration of the monarchy pursued by the invading forces of Austria and Prussia who sought to crush the nascent revolutionary republic. Many of the residents of the Sundgau made "pilgrimages" to places like Mariastein Abbey, near Basel, in Switzerland, for baptisms and weddings. When the French Revolutionary Army of the Rhine was victorious, tens of thousands fled east before it. When they were later permitted to return (in some cases not until 1799), it was often to find that their lands and homes had been confiscated. These conditions led to emigration by hundreds of families to newly vacant lands in the Russian Empire in 1803–4 and again in 1808. A poignant retelling of this event based on what Goethe had personally witnessed can be found in his long poem Hermann and Dorothea.

In response to the final defeat of Napoleon in the "hundred day" restoration in 1815, Alsace along with other French frontier provinces was under military occupation by foreign forces from 1815 to 1818, including over 280,000 soldiers and 90,000 horses in Bas-Rhin alone. This had grave effects on trade and the economy of the region since former overland trade routes were switched to newly opened Mediterranean and Atlantic seaports.

The population grew rapidly, from 800,000 in 1814 to 914,000 in 1830 and 1,067,000 in 1846. The combination of economic and demographic factors led to hunger, housing shortages and a lack of work for young people. Thus, it is not surprising that people left Alsace, not only for Paris – where the Alsatian community grew in numbers, with famous members such as Baron Haussmann – but also for more distant places like Russia and the Austrian Empire, to take advantage of the new opportunities offered there: Austria had conquered lands in Eastern Europe from the Ottoman Empire and offered generous terms to colonists as a way of consolidating its hold on the new territories. Many Alsatians also began to sail to the United States, settling in many areas from 1820 to 1850. In 1843 and 1844, sailing ships bringing immigrant families from Alsace arrived at the port of New York. Some settled in Illinois, many to farm or to seek success in commercial ventures: for example, the sailing ships Sully (in May 1843) and Iowa (in June 1844) brought families who set up homes in northern Illinois and northern Indiana. Some Alsatian immigrants were noted for their roles in 19th-century American economic development. Others ventured to Canada to settle in southwestern Ontario, notably Waterloo County.

=== Jews ===
By 1790, the Jewish population of Alsace was approximately 22,500, about 3% of the provincial population. They were highly segregated and subject to long-standing antisemitic regulations. They maintained their own customs, Yiddish language, and historic traditions within the tightly knit ghettos; they adhered to Talmudic law enforced by their rabbis. Jews were barred from most cities and instead lived in villages. They concentrated in trade, services, and especially in money lending. They financed about a third of the mortgages in Alsace. Official tolerance grew during the French Revolution, with full emancipation in 1791. However, local antisemitism also increased and Napoleon turned hostile in 1806, imposing a one-year moratorium on all debts owed to Jews. In the 1830–1870 era, most Jews moved to the cities, where they integrated and acculturated, as antisemitism sharply declined. By 1831, the state began paying salaries to official rabbis, and in 1846 a special legal oath for Jews was discontinued. Antisemitic local riots occasionally occurred, especially during the Revolution of 1848. The merger of Alsace into Germany in 1871-1918 lessened antisemitic violence.

== Struggle between France and united Germany ==
We Germans who know Germany and France know better what is good for the Alsatians than the unfortunates themselves. In the perversion of their French life they have no exact idea of what concerns Germany.

— Heinrich von Treitschke, German nationalist historian and politician, 1871

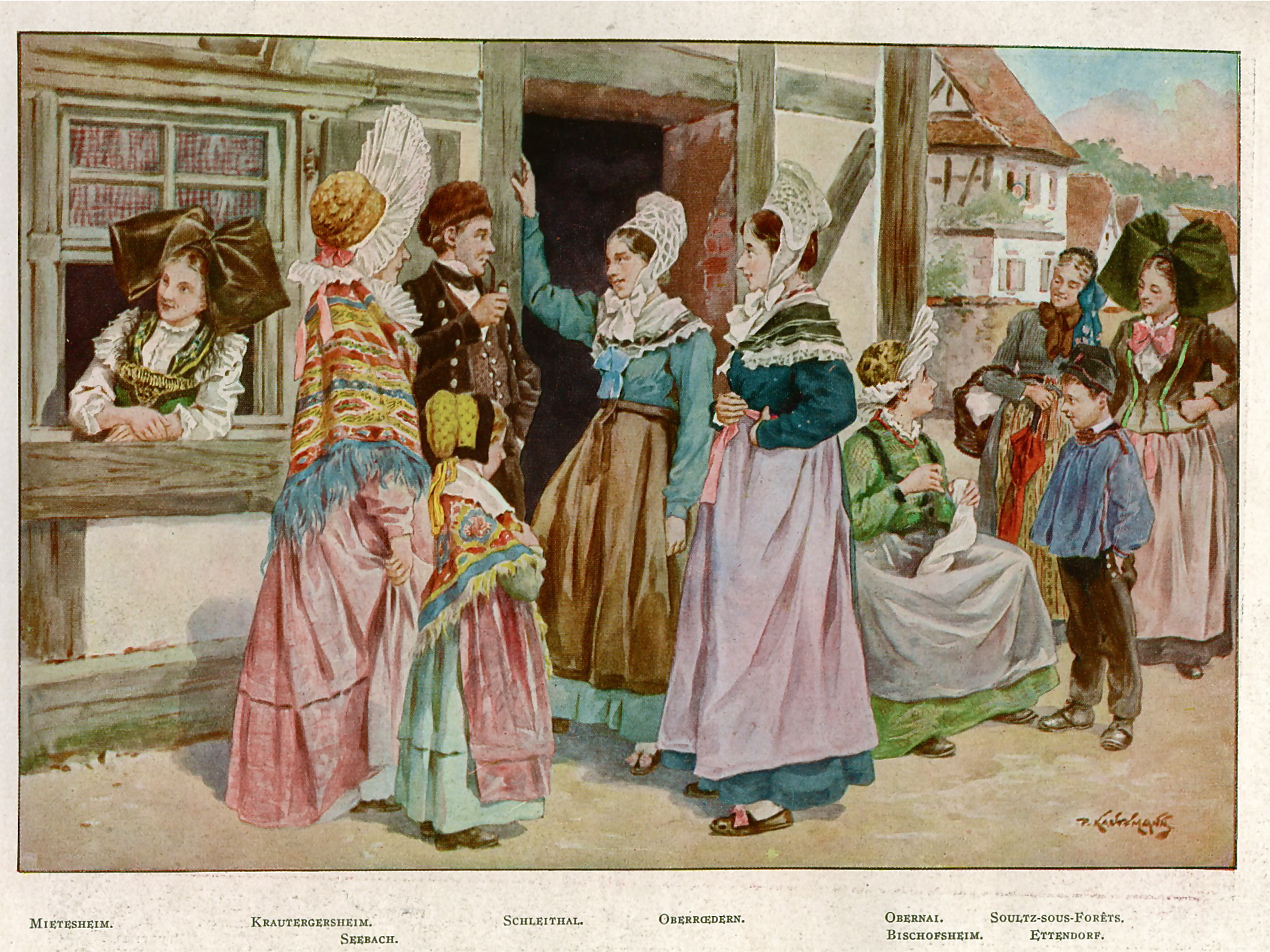
Traditional costumes of Alsace

The Franco-Prussian War, which started in July 1870, saw France defeated in May 1871 by the Kingdom of Prussia and other German states. The end of the war led to the unification of Germany. Otto von Bismarck annexed Alsace and northern Lorraine to the new German Empire in 1871. France ceded more than 90% of Alsace and one-fourth of Lorraine, as stipulated in the treaty of Frankfurt. Unlike other members states of the German federation, which had governments of their own, the new Imperial territory of Alsace-Lorraine was under the sole authority of the Kaiser, administered directly by the imperial government in Berlin. Between 100,000 and 130,000 Alsatians (of a total population of about a million and a half) chose to remain French citizens and leave Reichsland Elsaß-Lothringen, many of them resettling in French Algeria as Pieds-Noirs. Only in 1911 was Alsace-Lorraine granted some measure of autonomy, which was manifested also in a flag and an anthem (Elsässisches Fahnenlied). In 1913, however, the Saverne Affair (French: Incident de Saverne) showed the limits of this new tolerance of the Alsatian identity.

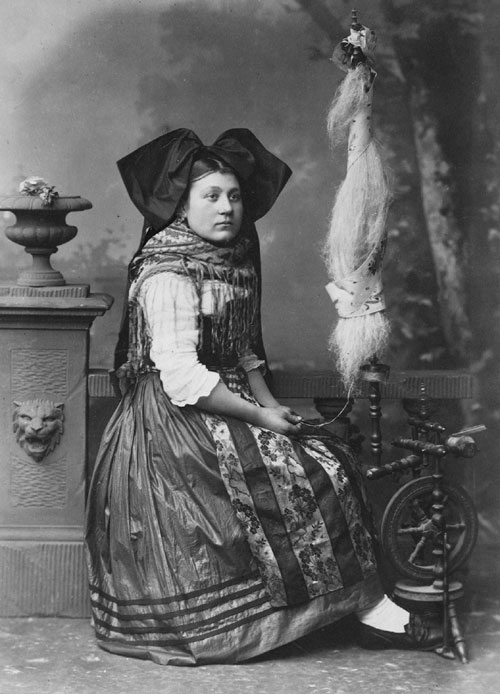
An Alsatian woman in traditional costume, photographed by Adolphe Braun

During the First World War, to avoid ground fights between brothers, many Alsatians served as sailors in the Kaiserliche Marine and took part in the Naval mutinies that led to the abdication of the Kaiser in November 1918, which left Alsace-Lorraine without a nominal head of state. The sailors returned home and tried to found an independent republic. While Jacques Peirotes, at this time deputy at the Landrat Elsass-Lothringen and just elected mayor of Strasbourg, proclaimed the forfeiture of the German Empire and the advent of the French Republic, a self-proclaimed government of Alsace-Lorraine declared its independence as the "Republic of Alsace-Lorraine". French troops entered Alsace less than two weeks later to quash the worker strikes and remove the newly established Soviets and revolutionaries from power. With the arrival of the French soldiers, many Alsatians and local Prussian/German administrators and bureaucrats cheered the re-establishment of order.

Although U.S. President Woodrow Wilson had insisted that the région was self-ruling by legal status, as its constitution had stated it was bound to the sole authority of the Kaiser and not to the German state, France would allow no plebiscite, as granted by the League of Nations to some eastern German territories at this time, because the French regarded the Alsatians as Frenchmen liberated from German rule. Germany ceded the region to France under the Treaty of Versailles.

Policies forbidding the use of German and requiring French were promptly introduced. However, propaganda for elections was allowed to go with a German translation from 1919 to 2008. In order not to antagonize the Alsatians, the region was not subjected to some legal changes that had occurred in the rest of France between 1871 and 1919, such as the 1905 French law on the separation of Church and State.

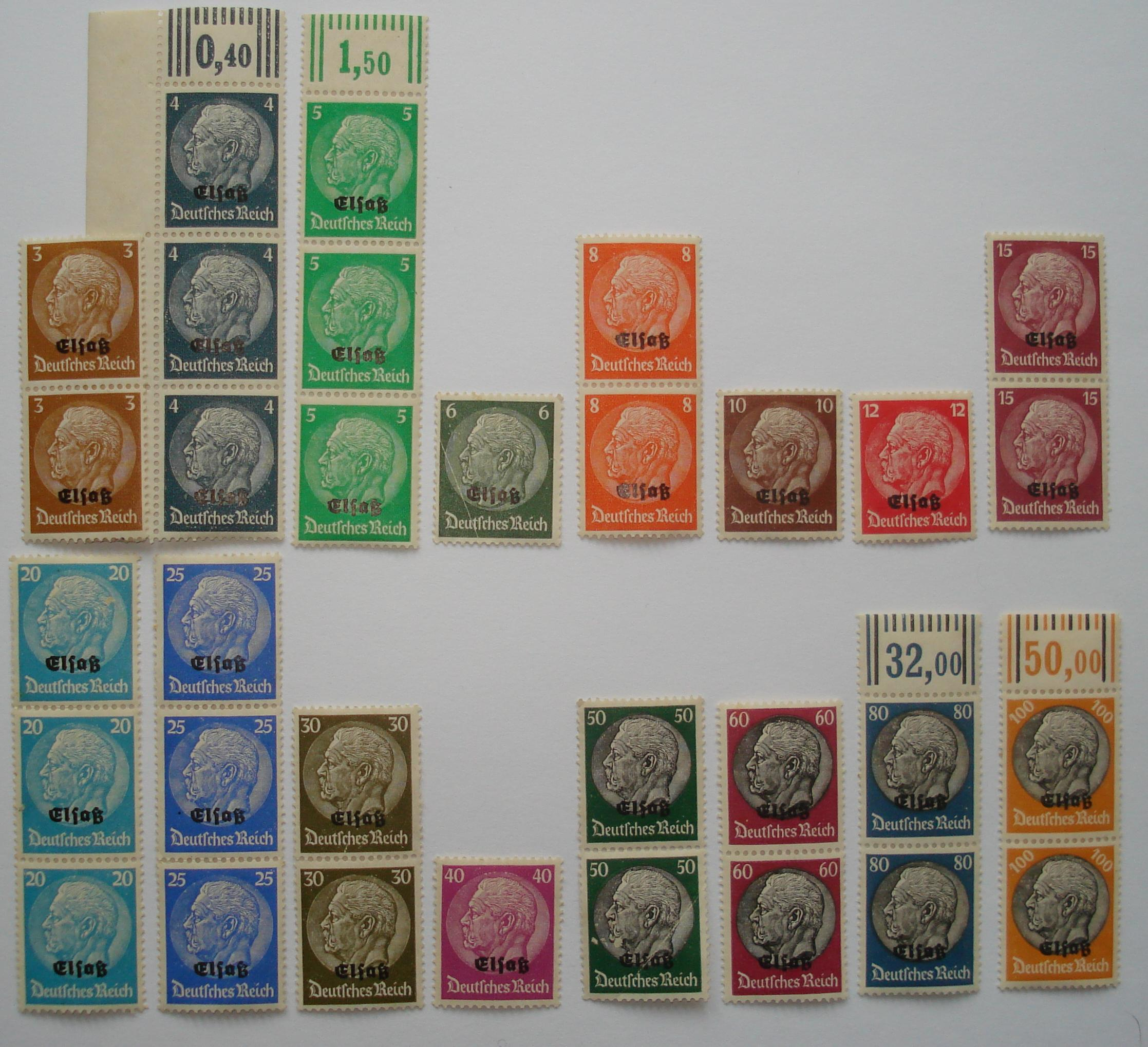
German stamps of Hindenburg marked with "Elsaß" (1940)

Alsace-Lorraine was occupied by Germany in 1940 during the Second World War. Although it was never formally annexed, Alsace-Lorraine was incorporated into the Greater German Reich, which had been restructured into Reichsgau. Alsace was merged with Baden, and Lorraine with the Saarland, to become part of a planned Westmark. During the war, 130,000 young men from Alsace and Lorraine were conscripted into the German army, allegedly against their will (malgré-nous), and in some cases volunteered for the Waffen SS. Some of the latter were involved in war crimes, such as the Oradour-sur-Glane massacre. Most perished on the eastern front. The few that could fled to Switzerland or joined the resistance. In July 1944, 1500 malgré-nous were released from Soviet captivity and sent to Algiers, where they joined the Free French Forces.

== After World War II ==
Today, the territory is in certain areas subject to some laws that are significantly different from the rest of France – this is known as the local law.

In more recent years, the Alsatian language is again being promoted by local, national, and European authorities as an element of the region's identity. Alsatian is taught in schools (but not mandatory) as one of the regional languages of France. German is also taught as a foreign language in local kindergartens and schools. However, the Constitution of France still requires that French be the only official language of the Republic.

== Timeline ==
Year(s)	Event	Ruled by	Official or common language
5400–4500 BC	Bandkeramiker/Linear Pottery cultures	-	Unknown
2300–750 BC	Bell Beaker cultures	—	Proto-Celtic spoken
750–450 BC	Hallstatt culture early Iron Age (early Celts)	—	None; Old Celtic spoken
450–58 BC	Celts/Gauls firmly secured in entire Gaul, Alsace; trade with Greece is evident (Vix)	Celts/Gauls	None; Gaulish variety of Celtic widely spoken
58 / 44 BC– AD 260	Alsace and Gaul conquered by Caesar, provinciated to Germania Superior	Roman Empire	Latin; Gallic widely spoken
260–274	Postumus founds breakaway Gallic Empire	Gallic Empire	Latin, Gallic
274–286	Rome reconquers the Gallic Empire, Alsace	Roman Empire	Latin, Gallic, Germanic (only in Argentoratum)
286–378	Diocletian divides the Roman Empire into Western and Eastern sectors	Roman Empire	
around 300	Beginning of Germanic migrations to the Roman Empire	Roman Empire	
378–395	The Visigoths rebel, precursor to waves of German, and Hun invasions	Roman Empire	Alamannic Incursions
395–436	Death of Theodosius I, causing a permanent division between Western and Eastern Rome	Western Roman Empire	
436–486	Germanic invasions of the Western Roman Empire	Roman Tributary of Gaul	Alamannic
486–511	Lower Alsace conquered by the Franks	Frankish Realm	Old Frankish, Latin; Alamannic
531–614	Upper Alsace conquered by the Franks	Frankish Realm	
614–795	Totality of Alsace to the Frankish Kingdom	Frankish Realm	
795–814	Charlemagne begins reign, Charlemagne crowned Emperor of the Romans on 25 December 800	Frankish Empire	Old Frankish; Frankish and Alamannic
814	Death of Charlemagne	Carolingian Empire	Old Frankish; Frankish and Alamannic varieties of Old High German
847–870	Treaty of Verdun gives Alsace and Lotharingia to Lothar I	Middle Francia (Carolingian Empire)	Frankish; Frankish and Alamannic varieties of Old High German
870–889	Treaty of Mersen gives Alsace to East Francia	East Francia (German Kingdom of the Carolingian Empire)	Frankish, Frankish and Alamannic varieties of Old High German
889–962	Carolingian Empire breaks up into five Kingdoms, Magyars and Vikings periodically raid Alsace	Kingdom of Germany	Frankish and Alamannic varieties of Old High German
962–1618	Otto I crowned Holy Roman Emperor	Holy Roman Empire	Old High German, Middle High German, Modern High German; Alamannic and Franconian German dialects
1618–1674	Louis XIII annexes portions of Alsace during the Thirty Years' War, confirmed at the Peace of Westphalia	Holy Roman Empire	German; Alamannic and Franconian dialects (Alsatian)
1674–1871	Louis XIV annexes the rest of Alsace during the Franco-Dutch War, establishing full French sovereignty over the region	Kingdom of France	French (Alsatian and German tolerated)
1871–1918	Treaty of Frankfurt after the Franco-Prussian War causes French cession of Alsace to German Empire	German Empire	German; Alsatian, French
1919–1940	Treaty of Versailles after World War I causes German cession of Alsace to France	France	French; Alsatian, French, German
1940–1944	Nazi Germany conquers Alsace, establishing Gau Baden-Elsaß	Nazi Germany	German; Alsatian, French, German
1945–present	French control	France	French; French and Alsatian German (declining minority language)

== See also ==
- Musée alsacien (Strasbourg)
- Route Romane d'Alsace
- German place names in Alsace
- Alsace independence movement
