= Divodurum Mediomatricorum =

- Divodurum
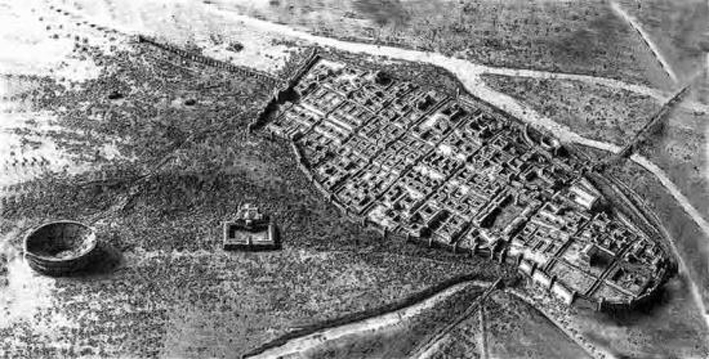
- Cityscape of Divodurum Mediomatricum (c. 2nd century AD)
- Interactive map of Divodurum Mediomatricorum
- Type: Celtic oppidum
- Periods: Roman Empire
- Location: Metz, France
- Region: Lorraine

Divodurum Mediomatricorum ('place of the gods, divine enclosure') (Note: From Gaulish deuos 'god' attached to duron 'gates' > 'enclosed town, market town').) was the main oppidum of the Mediomatrici (Gaulish: *Medio-māteres). Divodurum Mediomatricorum is mentioned by Tacitus in the early 1st century AD. The oldest settlement of the oppidum was located on a hill, at the confluence of the Moselle and Seille rivers, nowadays in France. The present-day city of Metz, attested c. 400 AD as civitas Mediomatricorum ('civitas of the Mediomatrici'), is named after the Celtic tribe.

== History ==
The Mediomatrici were, according to Caesar, a Gaulish tribe at the frontier to the Belgicae dwelling in the present-day region Lorraine and Upper Moselle department during the Iron Age and the Roman period. They are mentioned as Mediomatricorum and Mediomatricis (dat.) by Caesar (mid-1st c. BC), Mediomatrikoì (Μεδιοματρικοὶ ) by Strabo (early 1st c. AD), Mediomatrici by Pliny (1st c. AD), Mediomatricos (acc.) by Tacitus (early 2nd c. AD), and as Mediomátrikes (Μεδιομάτρικες) by Ptolemy (2nd c. AD).

During the Gallic Wars (58–50 BC), the Mediomatrici sent 5,000 men to support Vercingetorix who was besieged in Alesia in 52. In 69–70 of the Common Era, Divodurum was sacked by the armies of Vitellius, and 4,000 of its inhabitants massacred.

=== Settlements ===
A secondary settlement, whose original name is unknown, was located in Bliesbruck, in the eastern part of their civitas.
