= Panduru =

- Panduru, a village in Baia, Tulcea, Romania
- Basarab Panduru
- Marius Panduru (born 1975), Romanian cameraman
- PaNduru, a chiefdom of Alur people, Uganda
- Panduru, village in Kakinada Rural mandal, India
