= Mediomatrici =

Belgic tribe

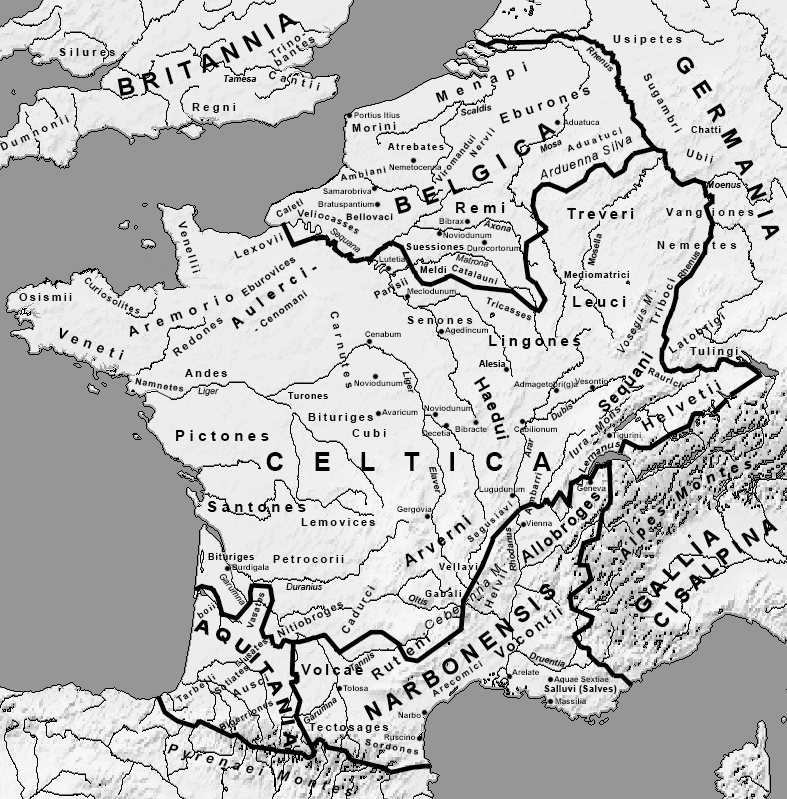

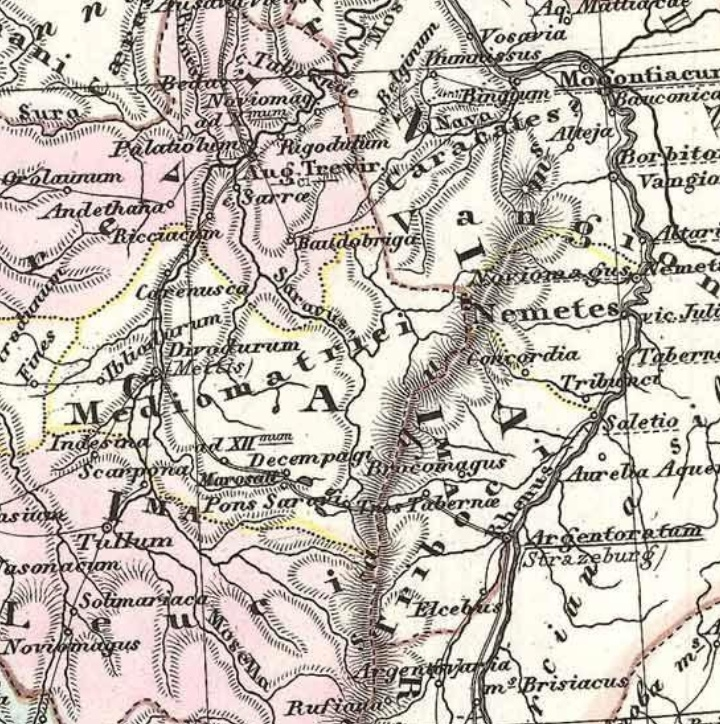
Civitas of the Mediomatrici

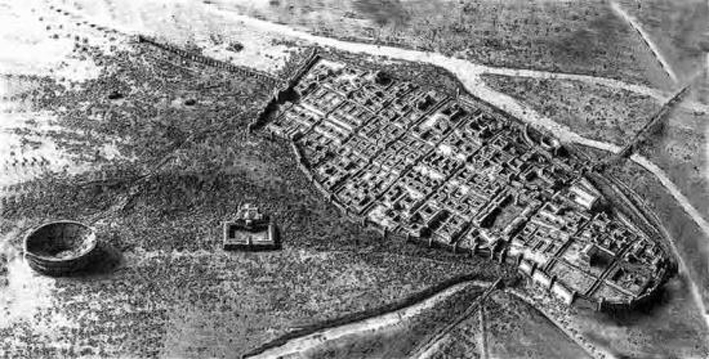
City scape of Divodurum Mediomatricum (ca. 2nd century AD), ancestor of present-day Metz, capital of the Mediomatrici.

The Mediomatrici (Gaulish: *Medio-māteres) were an ancient Belgic tribe living in the present-day regions of Lorraine, Upper Moselle during the Iron Age and the Roman period. The city of Metz is named after them.

== Name ==
They are mentioned as Mediomatricorum and Mediomatricis (dat.) by Caesar (mid-1st c. BC), Mediomatrikoì (Μεδιοματρικοὶ ) by Strabo (early 1st c. AD), Mediomatrici by Pliny (1st c. AD), Mediomatricos (acc.) by Tacitus (early 2nd c. AD), and as Mediomátrikes (Μεδιομάτρικες) by Ptolemy (2nd c. AD).

The ethnonym Mediomatrici is a Latinized form of the Gaulish *Medio-māteres, which literally means 'Middle-Mothers'. It is formed with the stem medio- ('in the middle, central') attached to a plural form of mātīr ('mother'). The name could be interpreted as meaning 'those who live between the Matrona (Marne) and the Matra rivers' (i.e. the mother-rivers), or possibly as the 'Mothers of the Middle-World' (i.e. between the heaven and the underworld).

The city of Metz, attested ca. 400 AD as civitas Mediomatricorum ('civitas of the Mediomatrici'), is named after the Celtic tribe.

== Geography ==
=== Territory ===
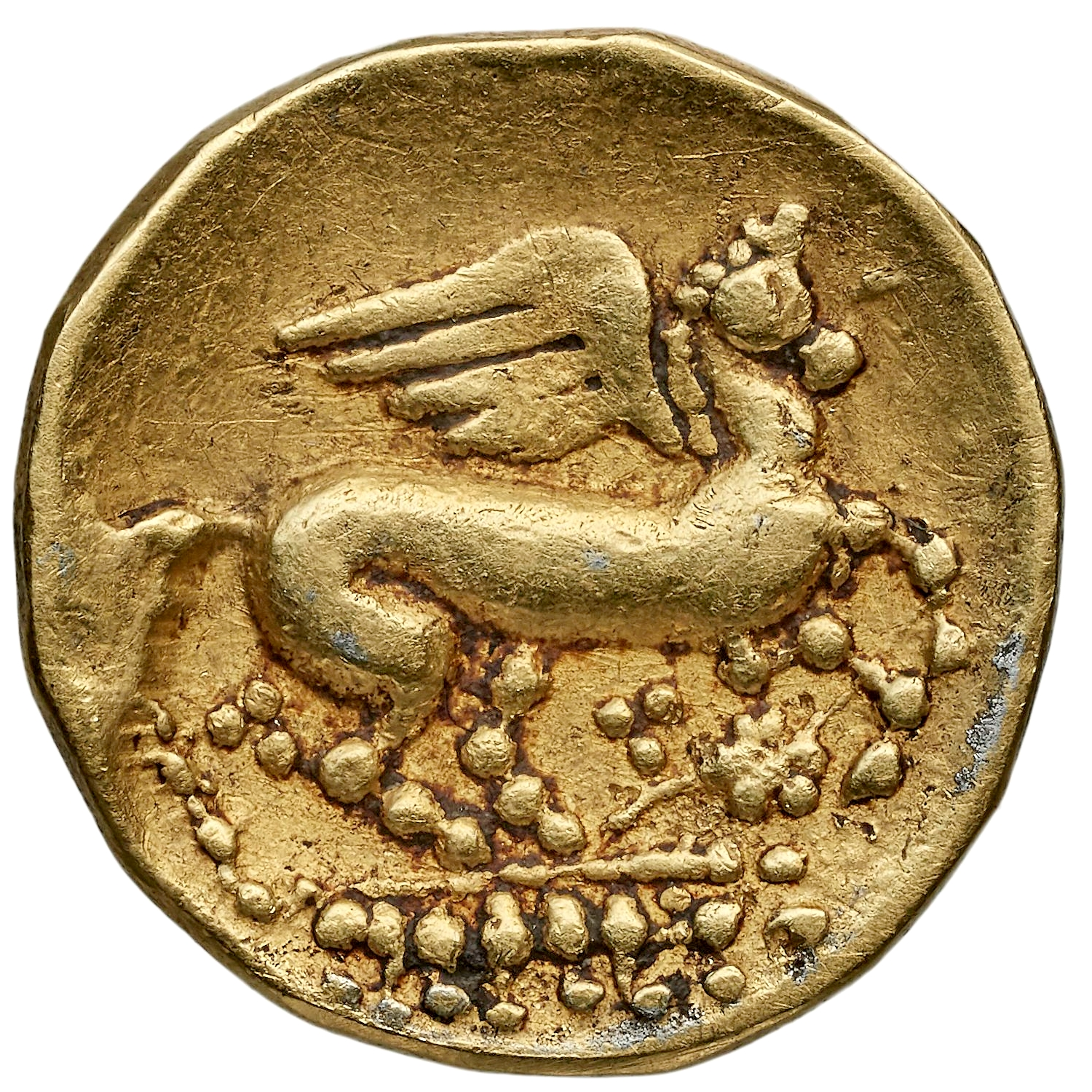
Mediomatrici quarter-stater. Ca. 100 BC.

Before the Roman conquest (57 BC), the territory of the Mediomatrici comprised the upper basins of the rivers Maas, Moselle and Saar, and extended eastwards as far as the Rhine in the mid-first century BC. Ptolemy places them south of the Treviri, between the Remi and the Leuci.

=== Settlements ===
Their chief town was Divodurum ('place of the gods, divine enclosure'), (Note: From Gaulish deuos 'god' attached to duron 'gates' > 'enclosed town, market town').) mentioned by Tacitus in the early 1st century AD.

A secondary agglomeration, whose original name is unknown, was located in Bliesbruck, in the eastern part of their civitas.

== History ==
During the Gallic Wars (58–50 BC), the Mediomatrici sent 5,000 men to support Vercingetorix who was besieged in Alesia in 52. In 69–70 of the Common Era, their capital Divodurum was sacked by the armies of Vitellius, and 4,000 of its inhabitants massacred. The Romanization of the Metromatrici was apparently slower compared to their neighbours the Treviri.

Elements of the Mediomatrici may have settled near Novara, in northwestern Italy, where place-names allude to their presence, such as Mezzomerico, attested as Mediomadrigo in 980.
