= Pandur =

Type of light infantry

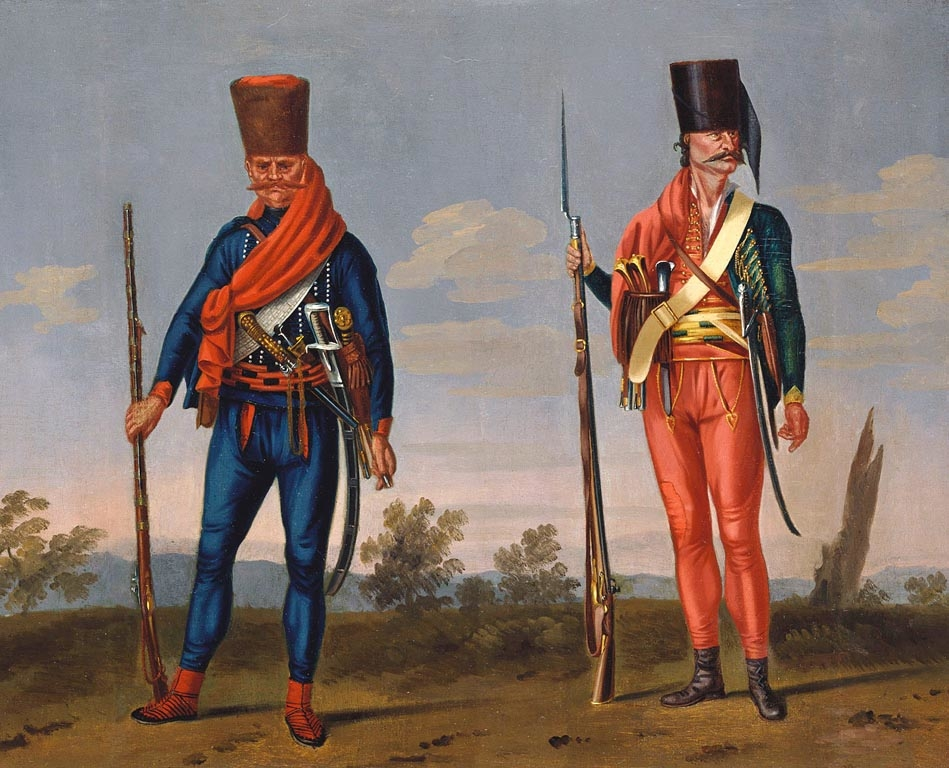
c. 1748 painting of a pandur of Trenck's Pandurs (right)

Pandurs were a type of light infantry unit raised in Central Europe. The first was Trenck's Pandurs, used by the Kingdom of Hungary from 1741, fighting in the War of the Austrian Succession and the Silesian Wars. Others to follow included Vladimirescu's Pandurs, a militia established by Tudor Vladimirescu in the Wallachian uprising of 1821, Pandurs of the Croatian Military Frontier, a frontier guard infantry unit deployed in the late 18th century, Pandurs of the Kingdom of Dalmatia, a frontier guard infantry unit deployed in the 19th century. In the second half of the 18th century the Republic of Venice used pandurs as a local militia to fight bandits in the Dalmatia area.

== History ==
In early 19th century Wallachia, being a Pandur was a fixed, legally recognized social status—whether or not one was a member of a specific military unit. This social condition had a considerable bearing on the central role played by Pandurs in the Wallachian uprising of 1821.

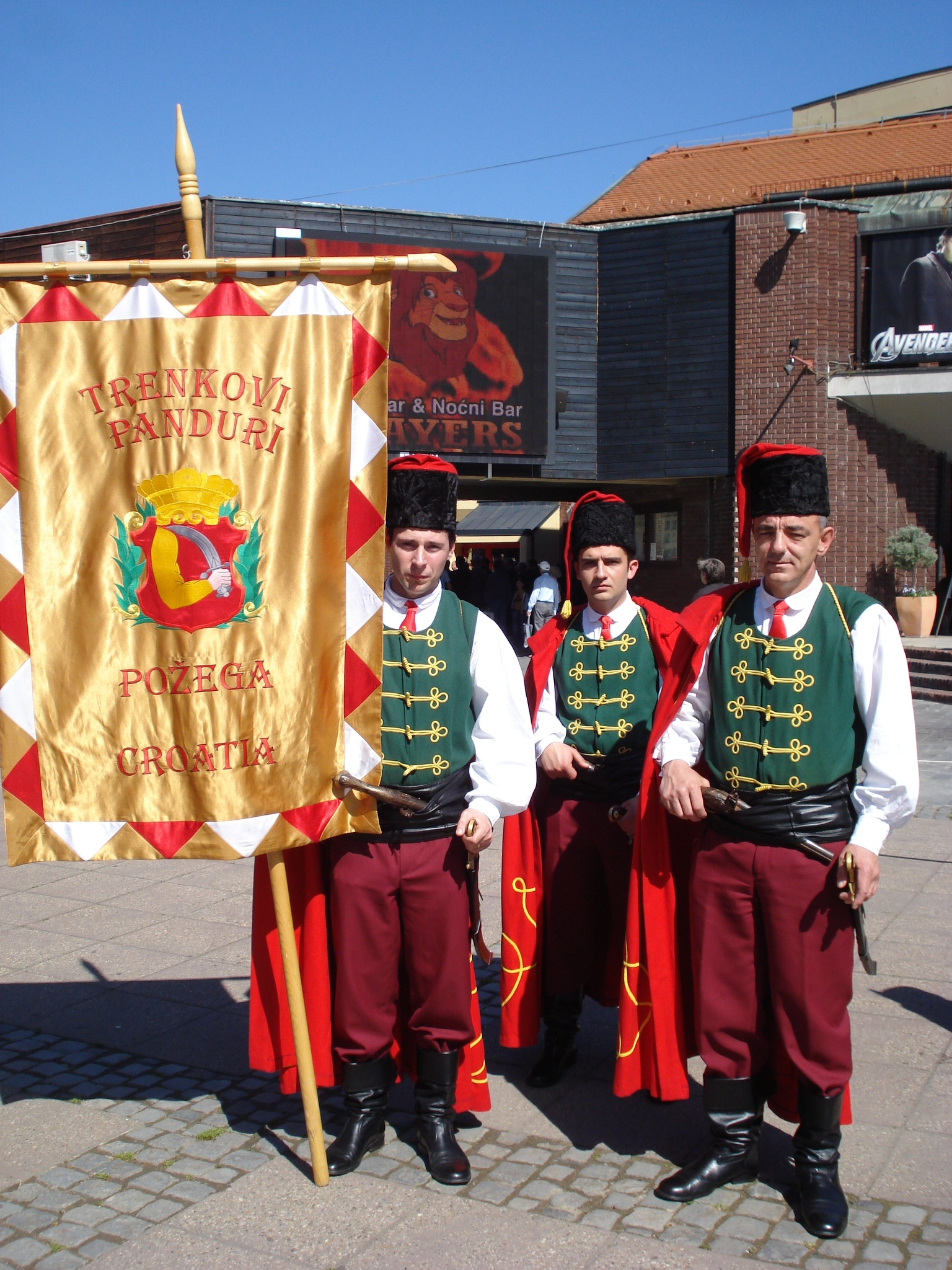
Trenck's Pandurs living history troop from Požega, Croatia

By the middle of the 18th century, law enforcement in the counties of Croatia included county pandurs or hussars who patrolled roads and pursued criminals. In 1740, the term was applied to frontier guard duty infantry deployed in the Croatian Military Frontier (Banal Frontier), specifically its Karlovac and Varaždin Generalcies. The role of the pandurs as security guards was extended to Dalmatia after the establishment of Austrian rule there in the early 19th century. The term has dropped from official use for law enforcement officials, but it is still used colloquially in Croatia and the Western Balkans in a manner akin to the English word cop. The unit raised and led by Trenck is also referred to more specifically as Trenck's Pandurs, and less frequently in Croatia than elsewhere, as Croatian Pandurs.

== Etymology ==
The term pandur made its way into military use via a Hungarian loanword, in turn originating from the Croatian term pudar, though the nasal in place of the "u" suggests a borrowing before Croatian innovated its own reflex for Proto-Slavic /ɔ̃/. "Pudar" is still applied to security guards protecting crops in vineyards and fields, and it was coined from the verb puditi (also spelled pudati) meaning to chase or scare away. The meaning of the Hungarian loanword was expanded to guards in general, including law enforcement officers. The word was likely ultimately derived from medieval Latin banderius or bannerius, meaning either a guardian of fields or summoner, or follower of a banner.

== Influence ==
Pandurs was also the name for the armed guard units of the Rila Monastery in Ottoman-ruled Bulgaria. In the 19th century, the Rila Monastery Pandurs numbered around 40 and they were headed by Ilyo Voyvoda at one point.

The name was also borrowed for Pandour Corps of Dutch East India Company and Pandoer card game.
