= Pandoer =

Dutch card game

Pandoer is a Dutch card game which shows certain resemblance to solo whist and klaverjas. It is normally played by four players using cents and a 33-card deck composed from French playing cards.

== Rules ==
The rules differ in many ways, but the following are roughly the general rules:

=== Material ===
The game is played with 33 cards: all cards from 7 and up from a French-suited deck (a piquet deck) and the six of hearts. In addition, each player starts with a certain number of 'cents' on a stack in front of them. At the start of the game, each player puts ten of their cents into the 'pot', a community stack next to the middle of the table. This is called "lappen". Whenever the pot exhausts, this process is repeated.

=== Deal ===
One of the players is the dealer for the first round. Every subsequent round, this role will pass to the left. The dealer shuffles the cards and hands four personal cards to each player, which the opponents are not supposed to see, then one open card in the middle of the table, the 'kijkkaart' ('watch card') and finally four more personal cards to each player. Now, the whole deck has been dealt.

=== Bidding phase ===
In the bidding phase, the 'game' to be played is determined. The player to the left of that round's dealer, the elder hand, starts by either naming a game they expect to succeed in, or passing, excluding the player from the remainder of the bidding round. In a clockwise rotation, the players have the opportunity to (1) bid a higher-ranked game, (2) to 'overhonour' (see points games) a kereltje, pandoer or pandoer privé bid or (3) to pass. Once only one player remains, that game will be played after they have taken the watch card to become a personal card and subsequently discarded one of their nine cards. The player in question is now the proclaimer. If all players pass before a single game has been bid, a process called 'husselen' will take place: the elder hand takes the watch card, shuffles the nine cards and gives each of the remaining players three of them. The other players have to return three cards, no matter whether or not they are any of the three newly received cards, to the elder hand. That player then shuffles these nine cards and, finally, counts to the fifth card, which they lay open in the middle of the table, to be the new watch card. That player may start the new bidding round. In case every player passes once again, it is the middlehand's turn to start the process of 'husselen', and so on. The games from low to high are the following:

- 100
- 110
- 120
- 130
- piccolo
- misery
- 140
- 150
- 160
- kereltje
- zwabber
- solo-zwabber
- 170 and every multiple of 10 higher than that
- open piccolo
- open misery
- pandoer
- silent piccolo-praatje
- piccolo-praatje
- silent praatje
- praatje
- pandoer privé

=== Play ===
Depending on the game that is played, the proclaimer may or may not have to declare a teammate and/or one of the suits in the deck the trump suit. Then, the play starts with them laying down one of their personal cards face-up on the table. The suit that this card has is now called the 'suit led'. In a clockwise rotation, the players have to lay a card of that suit face-up on the table, unless they do not have any of them, in which case they are allowed to play any card. In addition, one may always play a card of the trump suit, provided it is the highest trump card played until then (keep in mind the atypical ranking which applies to trump cards). One may never play a trump card that is lower than the highest trump card played until then, unless the player has only lower trump cards in his hand or if the trump suit is the suit led and the player does not own any higher trump cards. Finally, the owner of the jack of trumps is free not to play it if otherwise forced to. Once all players have played a card, the person who played the highest trump card wins the trick according to the trump suit ranking: jack-9-ace-king-queen-10-8-7-6 from high to low. If no one played a trump card, the person who played the highest card in the suit led wins the trick, according to the more common ranking: ace-king-queen-jack-10-9-8-7-6 from high to low. The winner collects the cards that were played in the trick, lays them face down in front of him/her and plays the first card for the next trick. If the proclaimer wins a trick while he has a teammate, his teammate collects the cards. In the misery and piccolo games, it is customary to leave the cards in the middle and play the following cards on top of them.

==== Points games ====
The points games are named after a multiple of 10, starting from 100. At the start of such a game, the proclaimer announces a trump suit and a teammate according to the classical system: he 'asks' the ace of a non-trump suit he does not own himself and he has not discarded. If the ace of trumps is the only ace that is owned by one of the other players, they are allowed ask that one. If all aces are among the proclaimer's cards and the discarded card, he/she may also ask a non-trump king, et cetera. The owner of the asked card makes himself known and is now the teammate of the asking player.

Together, they must score at least the number of points that the proclaimer had bid. 'Honours' make up one source of points. During the first trick, the highest bidder and his teammate name the combinations they own after playing their card. The following combinations are worth points:

- three-card: three cards of the same suit that are adjacent in rank according to the non-trump ranking. 20 points
- four-card: four cards of the same suit that are adjacent in rank according to the non-trump ranking. 50 points
- five-card: five cards of the same suit that are adjacent in rank according to the non-trump ranking. 100 points
- four of a kind: all four queens, kings or aces. 100 points
- six-card: six cards of the same suit that are adjacent in rank according to the non-trump ranking. 120 points
- seven-card: seven cards of the same suit that are adjacent in rank according to the non-trump ranking. 140 points
- eight-card: eight cards of the same suit that are adjacent in rank according to the non-trump ranking. 160 points
- jacks: all four jacks. 200 points

The sequences are named as follows: "[number of cards]-card of [the highest card of the sequence]". A sequence with a 10, jack, queen and king of hearts is thus called "a four-card of the king of hearts".

The same scoring system is used for overhonouring a kereltje, pandoer or pandoer privé bid, during the bidding phase. The player who overhonours states the name of the game plus his number of honour points, for example 'pandoer 50'. A player is allowed to use the watch card to make those combinations during the bidding phase, but is forced to keep all cards that are in the used combinations. This bid can be overturned by a yet higher number of honour points, or, if the numbers are equal, by the highest-scoring combination (so a five-card beats two four-cards), then by the highest card of this sequence (so a four-card of the king of hearts beats a four-card of the 10 of clubs and aces beat queens), where four of a kind beats a five-card. If this can not make a difference, the earlier bidder wins.

If a member of the playing team has both the king and the queen of the trump suit, he/she may give notice while playing both of them, earning the team an extra 20 points ('marriage').

At the end of the play, the teammate counts the points from the stack of cards they have collected. This is done according to the following scoring system:

- Tens: 10 points each
- Jacks of non-trumps: 1 point each
- Queens: 2 points each
- Kings: 3 points each
- Aces: 11 points each
- Nine of trumps: 14 points
- Jack of trumps: 20 points
- Winning the last trick: 5 points

The rest of the cards are worth zero points. After counting, the points for honours, marriage, the collected cards and winning the last trick are added together. If the team scored the proclaimer's bid or more, both players are allowed to take 1 cent out of the pot if the bid was 120 or fewer, 2 cents if it was 130, 3 cents if it was between 140 and 160 and 4 cents if it was higher than or equal to 170. If the team did not score enough points, both members have to pay the amount that corresponds to the bid to the pot. The playing team can earn a one cent bonus for each player for winning all tricks.

==== Piccolo/misery ====
In piccolo or misery, there is no trump suit and no teammate. In piccolo, the player is supposed to win precisely 1 trick and in misery, the player must win 0 tricks. If they succeed, they take 3 cents in case of piccolo and 4 cents in the case of misery. The same amounts must be paid to the pot in case of a loss.

==== Kereltje ====
The proclaimer announces a trump suit and the owner of that suit's jack becomes their teammate. If the team win every single trick, both players are allowed to take 3 cents out of the pot. If not, they have to pay 3 cents each to the pot. If a person turns out to have discarded a card from a combination the player has used to overhonour a kereltje bid, he must also pay for his teammate, so 6 cents.

==== Zwabber ====
In zwabber, there is no trump suit. The first player to win a trick apart from the proclaimer himself, will become teammate. If they win every single trick together, both players are allowed to take 3 cents out of the pot. If not, they have to pay 3 cents to the pot each. The proclaimer can win a one cent bonus by winning every single trick.

==== Solo-zwabber ====
In solo-zwabber, there is no trump suit. If the proclaimer wins every single trick on his own, he/she is allowed to take 5 cents out of the pot. If not, 5 cents are to be paid to the pot.

==== Open piccolo/misery ====
In open piccolo and open misery, there is no trump suit and no teammate. After the fifth card has been played (the first card of the second trick), the proclaimer shows his cards to the rest of the players for the remainder of the play. He/she must win precisely one trick in open piccolo and win zero tricks in open misery. If successful, the player may take 6 cents out of the pot in case of open misery and 5 cents in case of open piccolo. If not, they pay the corresponding amount to the pot.

==== Pandoer ====
At the start of the play, the proclaimer announces a trump suit and a teammate according to the classical system (see Points games). If the team win all eight tricks together, they may take 5 cents out of the pot each. They are to pay 5 cents each to the pot in case of failure. If a person turns out to have discarded a card from a combination that the player has used to overhonour the pandoer bid, he must also pay for his teammate, so 10 cents.

==== (Silent) (piccolo) praatje ====
In a praatje game, there is no trump suit. All cards are laid open in front of each player before the start of the game. If the bid was a silent (piccolo) praatje, the opposing players are not allowed to communicate. If the bid was a (piccolo) praatje, they are. In a piccolo game, the proclaimer must win precisely 1 trick. Otherwise, he must win 0 tricks. If successful, the player may take 6 cents out of the pot in a silent piccolo praatje game, 7 cents for a piccolo praatje and a silent praatje and 8 cents for a praatje. If not, the player is to pay the corresponding amount to the pot.

==== Pandoer privé ====
The proclaimer announces a trump suit. If they win every single trick on their own, they may take 10 cents out of the pot. If not, the player must pay 10 cents to the pot. If the player turns out to have discarded a card from a combination he/she has used to overhonour the pandoer bid, it is considered a loss.

=== Overview ===
Name	Trumps	Teammate	Winning condition	Value
100	X	Classical	100 points or more	1
110	X	Classical	110 points or more	1
120	X	Classical	120 points or more	1
130	X	Classical	130 points or more	2
Piccolo			1 trick	3
Misery			0 tricks	4
140	X	Classical	140 points or more	3
150	X	Classical	150 points or more	3
160	X	Classical	160 points or more	3
Kereltje	X	Jack of trumps	all tricks	3
Zwabber		First other person to win a trick	all tricks	3
Solo-zwabber			all tricks	5
170+	X	Classical	Bid number of points or more	4
Open piccolo			1 trick*	5
Open misery			0 tricks*	6
Pandoer	X	Classical	all tricks	5
Silent piccolo praatje			1 trick**	6
Piccolo praatje			1 trick***	7
Silent praatje			0 tricks**	7
Praatje			0 tricks***	8
Pandoer Privé	X		all tricks	10

*The highest bidder shows his cards after the fifth card was played. **All players show their cards before the start of the play. ***All players show their cards before the start of the play and the highest bidder's opponents are allowed to communicate.
