= European Archaeological Park of Bliesbruck-Reinheim =

Archaeological park

Coordinates: 49°07′46″N 7°10′52″E

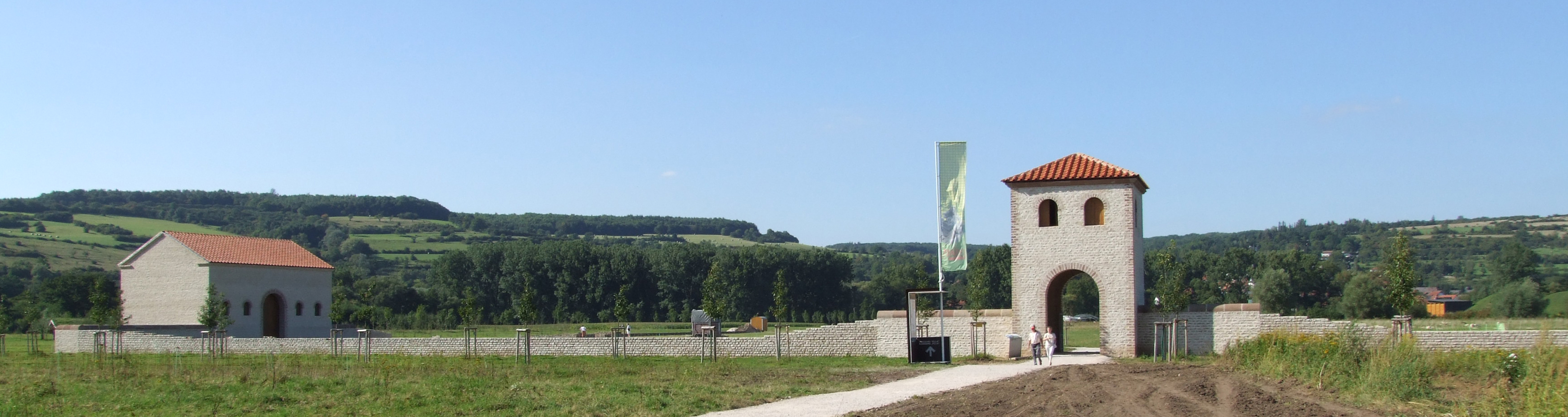
Reconstruction of Roman villa entrance

The European Archaeological Park at Bliesbruck-Reinheim, in the German municipality of Gersheim (Saarland) and the French municipality of Bliesbruck (Département Moselle), is a cross-border project which combines excavations and reconstructions of Celtic and Roman finds with exhibition and educational facilities. It was created in 1989 as a result of the archaeological work being done on both sides of the Franco-German border. Together with archaeological evidence from the Mesolithic Period, the Bronze Age, and the period of the Germanic migrations, the Celtic and Roman finds from the Iron Age bear witness to a history of continuous settlement in the Blies Valley that spans a period of 10,000 years.

== Management and funding ==
This European Archaeological Park is jointly operated by the conseil général of the French département of Moselle and the German district of Saarpfalz. The project receives additional funding from the French Ministry of Culture and Communication, the German state of Saarland, and the municipality of Gersheim. The founder of the European Archaeological Park was the late Jean Schaub (1927–2000), an entrepreneur who used private assets to buy up the first tracts of land belonging to the park, thus protecting them from development and saving the relics of the Roman past for posterity.

== Finds and excavations ==
- Hoard from the 8th century BC, discovered in 1964 in Reinheim. Similar types of hoards found in the greater Saar/Moselle region suggest that such repositories from the Urnfield culture may have cult significance.

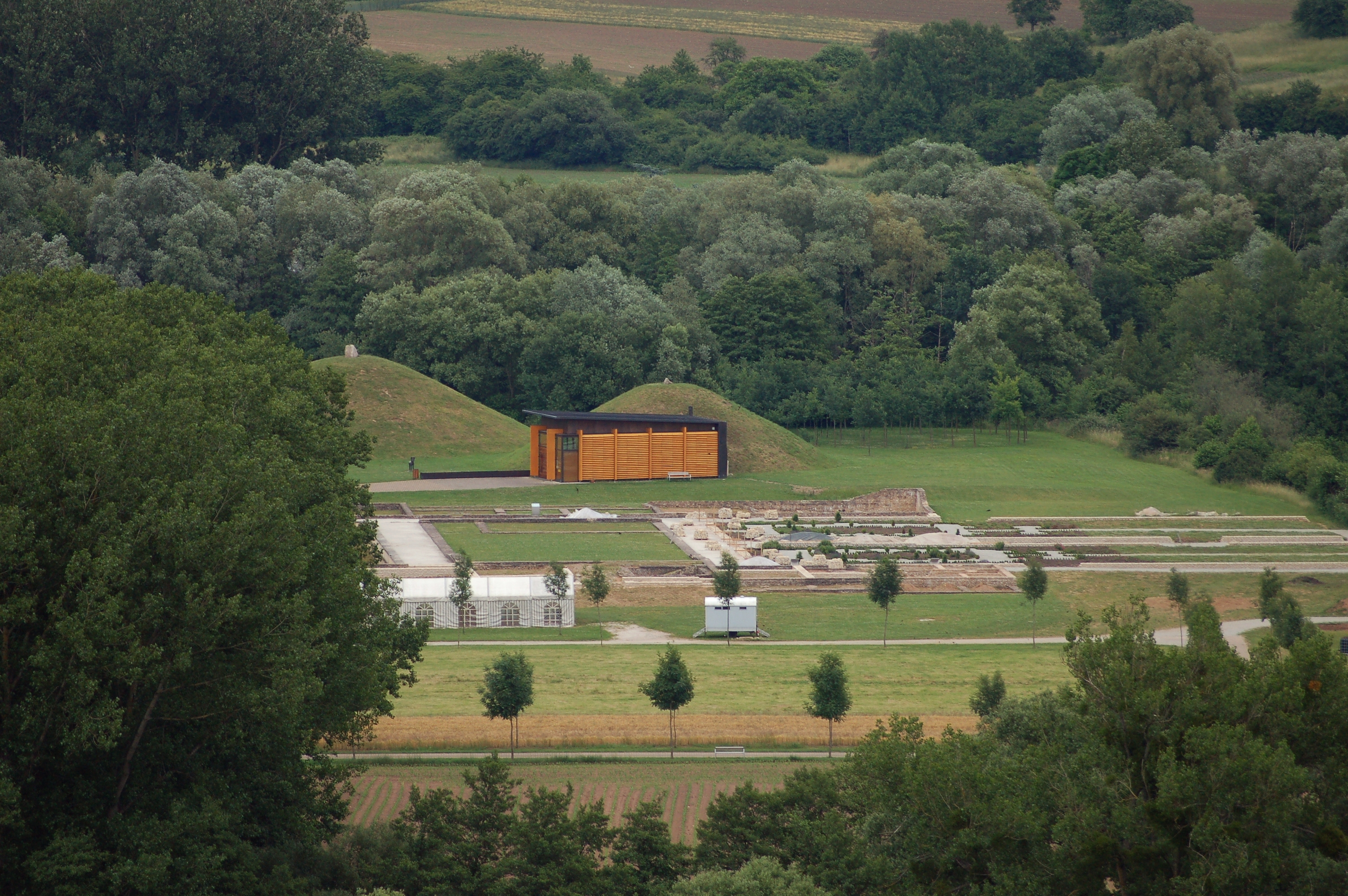
View of the Celtic Princess' grave mound

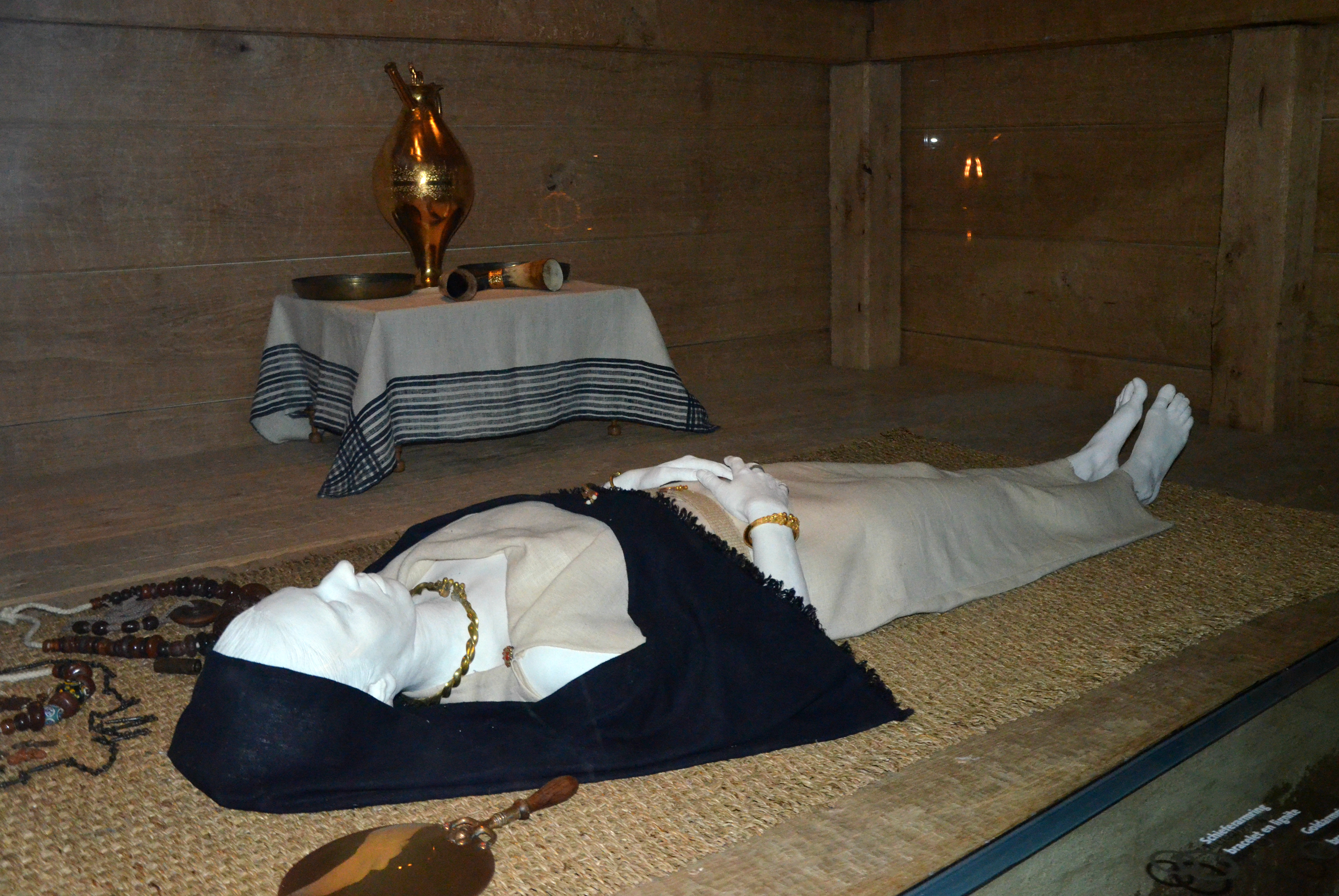
Princess of Reinheim burial reconstruction

- The Tomb of the Celtic Princess of Reinheim, dating from the 4th century BC (La Tène culture), is a woman's grave that was filled with exceptionally rich funerary objects. The burial chamber (3.5m x 3m x 1.2m), constructed of oaken beams, was covered over by a massive mound of earth (20m x 4.6m). It was excavated in 1954 by Alfons Kolling. Subsequent investigations in 1956 and 1957 revealed that there had originally been three burial mounds, of which the princess' tomb was just the smallest. The other two mounds had diameters of 22 metres and 36.5 metres, respectively. All three mounds were surrounded by circular ditches of 0.6 metres and 1.2 metres. Over the course of the last two millennia, soil erosion and cultivation caused the barrows to smooth out into a single hump about 2 metres high, which neighbouring villagers referred to as the Katzenbuckel ("cat's arched back"). In 1952, while digging out sand and gravel, the entrepreneur Johannes Schiel found an incomplete skeleton, later identified as male, at a depth of one metre, with a simple bronze choker and pottery shards as the only funerary objects. While digging in 1954 the entrepreneur's shovel struck a bronze object that was later interpreted to be the handle of a bronze mirror in figurine form. The fact that Johannes Schiel reported the find to the government conservation authorities (Staatliches Konservatorenamt) meant that it was possible to commission a professional excavation, which commenced at the beginning of March, 1954. On the third day of work, the excavators discovered, at a depth of 2.18 metres, the first funerary objects from the sumptuous Tomb of the Celtic Princess.
- A double tomb from the 4th century BC, located about 2000 metres from the Tomb of the Celtic Princess. This tomb contained the skeletons of two children, thought to be a girl of about 15 years of age and a boy of about 14, together with rich funerary objects. The skeletons of both children were quite well-preserved in the Muschelkalk soil of the Blies River Valley. The children had grown to a height of 1.5 and 1.55 metres, which was very tall for their time and leads to the conclusion that they were well nourished and lived in relative prosperity. The excavation took place in 2005.
- Vicus (a provincial Gallo-Roman settlement) in Bliesbruck, France. The excavations consist of a western craftsmen's quarter of 14 buildings used for manufacturing and trade, a large public thermae complex and an eastern quarter and forum area which have yet to be fully excavated (2008).
- The Roman villa in Reinheim, Germany. The first excavations go back as far as the early 19th century, but the villa has only been systematically excavated and researched since 1987. This very large complex includes courtyard walls enclosing an area 300 metres long and 135 metres wide with a main building to the north that measures almost 80 by 62 metres. One portion of the building in the north end of the west wing is thought to have been the villa's private thermal baths, due to the layout of its rooms and the discovery of water channels and fragments of cylindrical tiles (tubuli) attesting to the existence of under-floor heating (hypocaust). The exact date of the initial construction of the villa, which was located in an area that was inhabited by the Mediomatrics, a Celtic tribe, and conquered by the Romans in 50 BC, is not yet known. The complex reached its greatest size in the first half of the 3rd century AD. Following the first wave of destruction in the late 3rd century there was a period of reconstruction. The complex was destroyed by fire in the 4th century, after which it was never rebuilt. However, artefacts indicate that in the second half of the 4th century the west wing of the main building was again inhabited to some extent. The most famous artefact from the excavation is the Equestrian Mask of Reinheim, found in 2000 near one of the outbuildings. This bronze-plated iron mask in the form of a human face most likely served as a hinged visor on a Roman cavalryman's helmet. As of 2007, 110 of these impressive masks have been found worldwide.
- Frankish burial ground from the Merovingian period. This burial ground, which was re-covered between 1974 and 1986, contained approximately 115 graves.
- In addition to the ongoing excavations of the villa and the vicus, there is thought to be a prince's residence in the vicinity of the tomb of the princess, and archaeologists are also conducting exploratory excavations on the neighbouring heights in a concentrated effort to discover its location (2006).

== Visiting the park ==
On the German side there is a small museum which exhibits a selection of artefacts and replicas representing the whole range of periods from which finds have been made. In addition, there is a very impressive walk-in reconstruction of the Tomb of the Celtic Princess, including the most valuable funerary artefacts. In the area to the west there are reconstructions of a few Celtic-style dwellings. From a viewing mound it is easy to make out the partially reconstructed foundations of the large Roman villa, while the main gatehouse and one of the outbuildings of the villa have been completely reconstructed. Most of the original artefacts are now in the Museum für Vor- und Frühgeschichte (Museum of Prehistory and Protohistory) in Saarbrücken.

On the French side are the partially reconstructed thermal baths of the Gallo-Roman town, now sheltered by a roof and accompanied by helpful information plaques. The shop-lined town street is easily recognizable from its exposed foundations and cellars, as well as a portion of the street, with clear information displayed in French, German and English. There are reconstructions of a grist mill and baking oven, used for educational purposes. A recent addition is a garden containing plants that were typically considered useful at the time.

The entire park lies in the picturesque Blies Valley and provides a beautiful setting for walks.

== Re-enactment ==
In collaboration with the experts and the park authorities, a group of citizens calling themselves "Taranis" has been endeavouring since 2002 to recreate the Celtic way of life with its accoutrements from the early La Tène Period (La Tène A, c. 475 to 370 BC). They feature demonstrations of ancient crafts ranging from tablet weaving to the forging of Celtic utilitarian objects. Basing their activity on scientific research, the members then provide a graphic presentation of these crafts and ways of life. Every year at the park, this group offers a re-enactment of its knowledge of Celtic life and receives invitations to participate in events at other venues as well.

== The Archaeological Park in numbers ==
The park covers an area of approximately 1200 by 600 metres. Its archaeological sites attract about 40,000 visitors per year, including 20,000 schoolchildren.

== Film ==
- "Schätze des Landes" Bliesbruck-Reinheim und sein Europäischer Kultturpark. Im Tal der Keltenfürstin. ("Treasures of the Saarland" Bliesbruck-Reinheim and its European Archaeological Park. In the Valley of the Celtic Princess.) Documentary, 30 min. A film by Wolfgang Felk, produced by SWR, premiere broadcast on November 4, 2006.

== Related articles ==
- Bliesbruck Baths
- Oppidum du Fossé des Pandours
