= Wiesbach =

Wiesbach may refer to following places, rivers and streams in Germany:

Places

- Wiesbach (Palatinate), municipality in the county of Südwestpfalz in Rhineland-Palatinate
- Wiesbach (Ainring), village in the municipality of Ainring, county of Berchtesgadener Land, Bavaria
- Wiesbach (Eisenbach), village in the municipality of Eisenbach, county of Breisgau-Hochschwarzwald, Baden-Württemberg
- Wiesbach (Gangkofen), village in the borough of Markt Gangkofen, county of Rottal-Inn, Bavaria
- Wiesbach (Saar), village in the municipality of Eppelborn, county of Neunkirchen, Saarland

Rivers and streams

- Wiesbach (Ill), left hand tributary of the Ill (in capitals; ILL) in Eppelborn, county of Neunkirchen, Saarland
- Wiesbach (Klinglbach), right hand tributary of the Klinglbach or the Perlbach (tributary of the Regen) near Wies, municipality of Rattenberg, county of Straubing-Bogen, Bavaria
- Wiesbach (Lech), left hand tributary of the Lech opposite Pitzling, borough of Landsberg am Lech, county of Landsberg am Lech, Bavaria
- Wiesbach (Nahe), right hand tributary of the Nahe near Grolsheim, county of Mainz-Bingen, Rhineland-Palatinate
- Wiesbach (Our), left hand tributary of the Our above Wiescheid, Auw near Auw bei Prüm, Eifelkreis Bitburg-Prüm, Rhineland-Palatinate
- Wiesbach (Rott), left hand tributary of the Rott near Hörbering, borough of Neumarkt-Sankt Veit, county of Mühldorf am Inn, Bavaria
- Wiesbach, name of the upper reaches of the Auerbach, right hand tributary of the Schwarzbach in Niederauerbach, borough of Zweibrücken, Rhineland-Palatinate
- Wiesbach (Steinlach) or Oberwiesbach, right hand tributary of the Steinlach above Dußlingen, county of Tübingen, Baden-Württemberg
- Wiesbach (Usa), right hand tributary of the Usa near Kransberg, borough of Usingen, Hochtaunuskreis, Hesse
- Wiesbach (Weil), right hand tributary of the Weil above Audenschmiede, municipality of Weilmünster, county of Limburg-Weilburg, Hesse
