= Bickenalb =

River in France and Germany

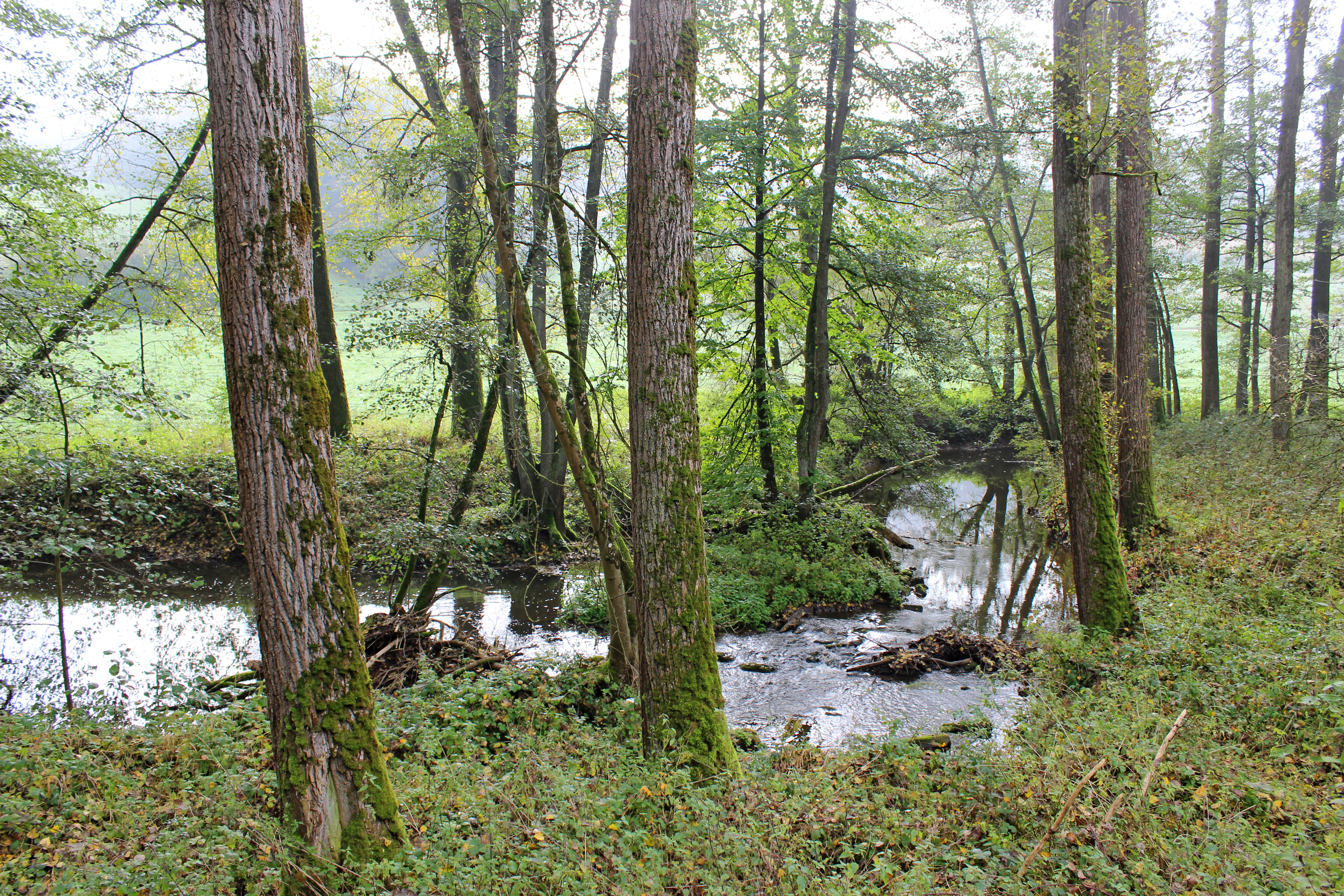

- Location within Germany Location within Rhineland-Palatinate

Location
- Countries: France; Germany
- Department: Moselle
- State: Saarland, Rhineland-Palatinate

Physical characteristics
- Source
  - coordinates: 49°03′28″N 7°17′34″E
- Mouth
  - location: Horn
  - coordinates: 49.2260°N 7.3592°E

Basin features
- Progression: Horn→ Schwarzbach→ Blies→ Saar→ Moselle→ Rhine→ North Sea

Bickenalb is a river of Moselle, France and Saarland, Germany. It flows into the Horn near Zweibrücken. Its course within France is 10.3 km (6.4 mi) long.

== See also ==
- List of rivers of Saarland
