= Mutterbach =

Mutterbach may refer to:

- Mutterbach (Blies), a river of Saarland, Germany, tributary of the Blies
- Mutterbach (Main), a river of Hesse and Bavaria, Germany, tributary of the Main
