= Ill (Saarland) =

River in Germany

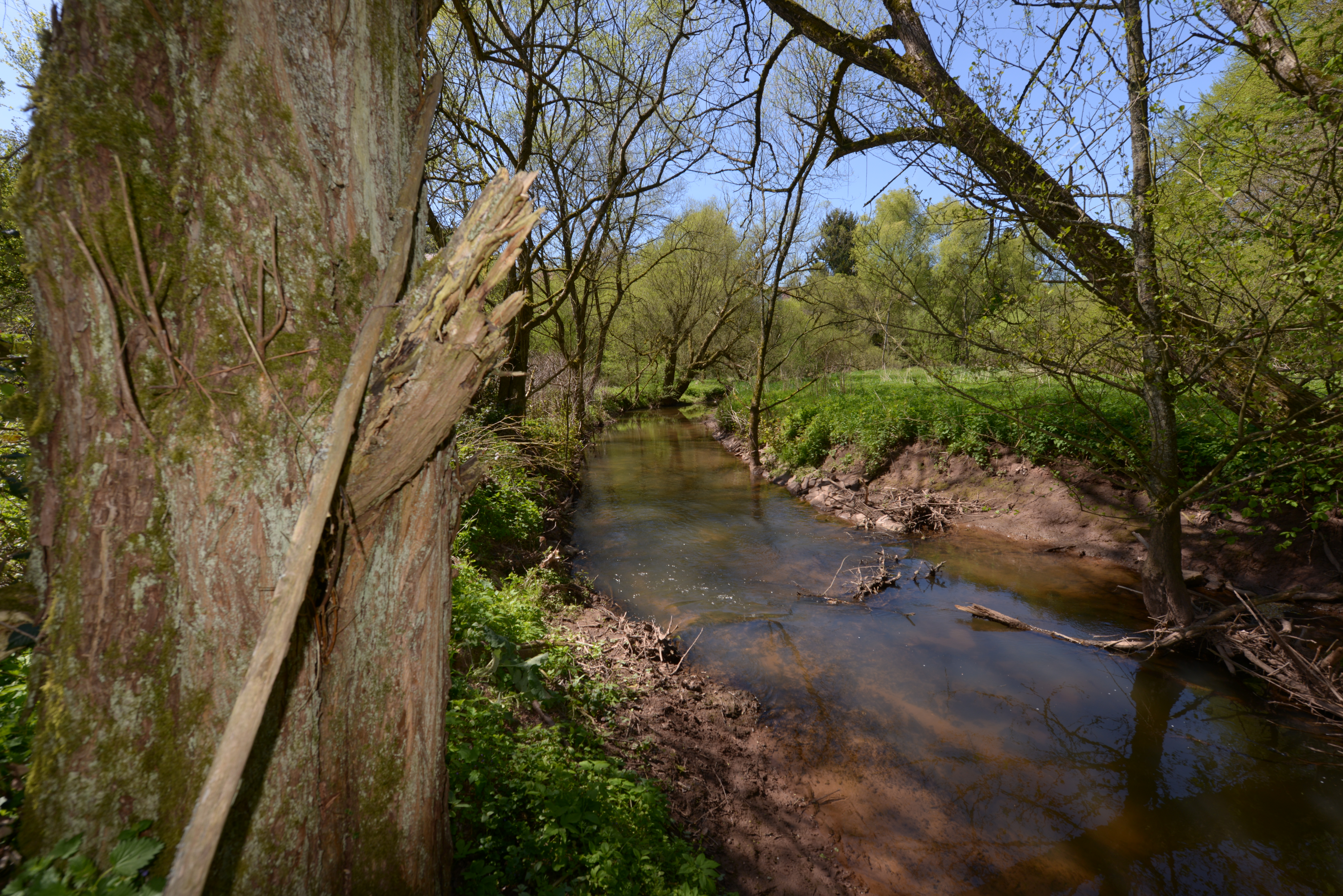

Location
- Country: Germany
- States: Saarland

Physical characteristics
- Mouth
  - location: Theel
  - coordinates: 49.4149°N 6.9344°E

Basin features
- Progression: Theel→ Prims→ Saar→ Moselle→ Rhine→ North Sea

Ill is a river of Saarland, Germany. It flows through Eppelborn, and discharges into the Theel near Lebach.

== See also ==
- List of rivers of Saarland
