= Löster =

River in Germany

Location
- Country: Germany
- State: Saarland

Physical characteristics
- Mouth
  - location: Prims
  - coordinates: 49.5254°N 6.8955°E

Basin features
- Progression: Prims→ Saar→ Moselle→ Rhine→ North Sea

The Löster or Lösterbach is a right tributary of the Prims in Rhineland-Palatinate and Saarland.

== Route ==
It rises to about 525 meters above sea level at Reinsfeld as Dörrenbach, is joined by the Rotbach near Hermeskeil and is then called Löster. It flows through the mills at the Steiner forest and crosses under the Federal Highway 1 (European route E422), flows through Bierfeld and Löstertal and flows at about 265 meters above sea level south of the Saarland town Wadern near the Dagstuhl Castle into the Prims, shortly before the mouth of the Wadrill in the Prims. The Hochwald train traverses the valley from Hermeskeil and crosses the Löster in the area where the Felsbach, which marks the border between Rhineland-Palatinate and Saarland, flows into it.

== Incoming rivers ==
Right tributaries include the Bach from Lascheiderhof, the Detzbach, the Bliedebach, and the Lohbach. Left tributaries are the Senkelbach, the Hahn Born Bach, the Bach at Erzberg, the Rotbach by Bach from Rückersbergerhof who Felsbach who Wäschbach and Nonnweiler Bach. ^{[2]}
