= Wurzbach (disambiguation) =

Wurzbach is a town in Thuringia, Germany.

Wurzbach may also refer to:

- Würzbach, a river of Saarland, Germany
- Wurzbach Parkway, a part freeway and part major arterial road in San Antonio, Texas

== People with the surname ==
- Alfred von Wurzbach (1846–1915), Austrian official and historian; son of Constantin von Wurzbach
- Constantin von Wurzbach (1818–1893), Austrian librarian, lexicographer and writer
- Harry M. Wurzbach (1874–1931), American politician
- Karl von Wurzbach (1809–1886), lawyer, politician, governor and state president of Carniola
- Pia Wurtzbach (born 1989), Filipina actress, model and Miss Universe 2015 winner
- Wolfgang von Wurzbach (1879–1957), Austrian linguist, literary scholar and collector

== See also ==
- Wurzbacher
- Würzbach
