= List of rivers of Saarland =

A list of rivers of Saarland, Germany:

== B ==
- Bickenalb
- Bist
- Blies
- Bos

== E ==
- Ellbach
- Erbach

== F ==
- Franzenbach

== G ==
- Gailbach
- Glan

== H ==
- Hetschenbach
- Holzbach

== I ==
- Ill

== K ==
- Köllerbach

== L ==
- Lambsbach
- Leukbach
- Löster

== M ==
- Mandelbach
- Moselle
- Mutterbach

== N ==
- Nahe
- Nied

== O ==
- Oster

== P ==
- Prims

== R ==
- Rohrbach
- Rossel

== S ==
- Saar
- Schwarzbach

== T ==
- Theel
- Todbach

== W ==
- Wadrill
- Würzbach
