= Gailbach =

Gailbach may refer to:

- Gailbach (Blies), a river of Moselle, France and Saarland, Germany, tributary of the Blies
- Gailbach (Drava), a river of East Tyrol, Austria, tributary the Drava
- Gailbach, a district of the town Aschaffenburg, Bavaria, Germany
