= Horn (Schwarzbach) =

River of France and Germany

Horn, Hornbach
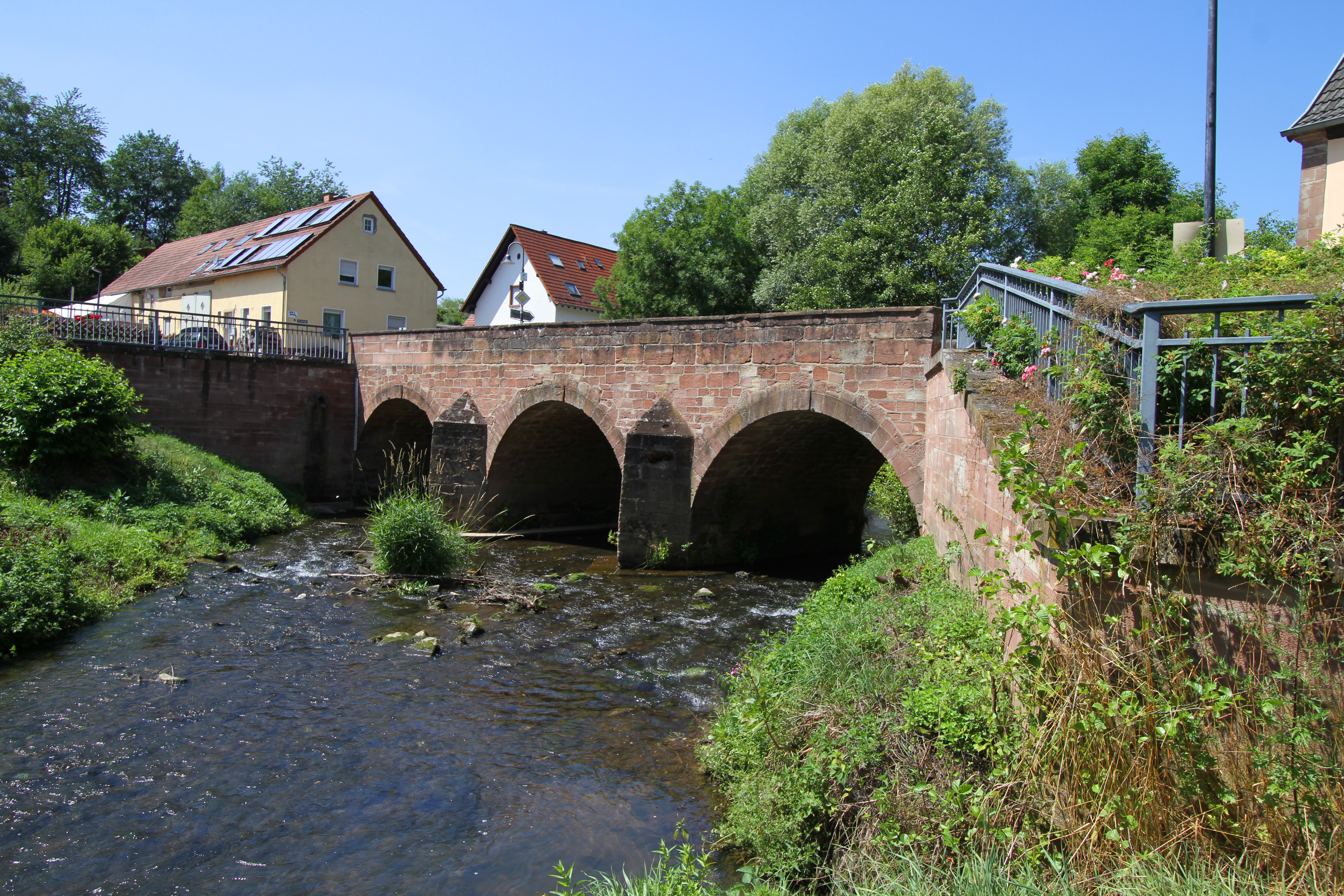
- The Horn in the town of Hornbach

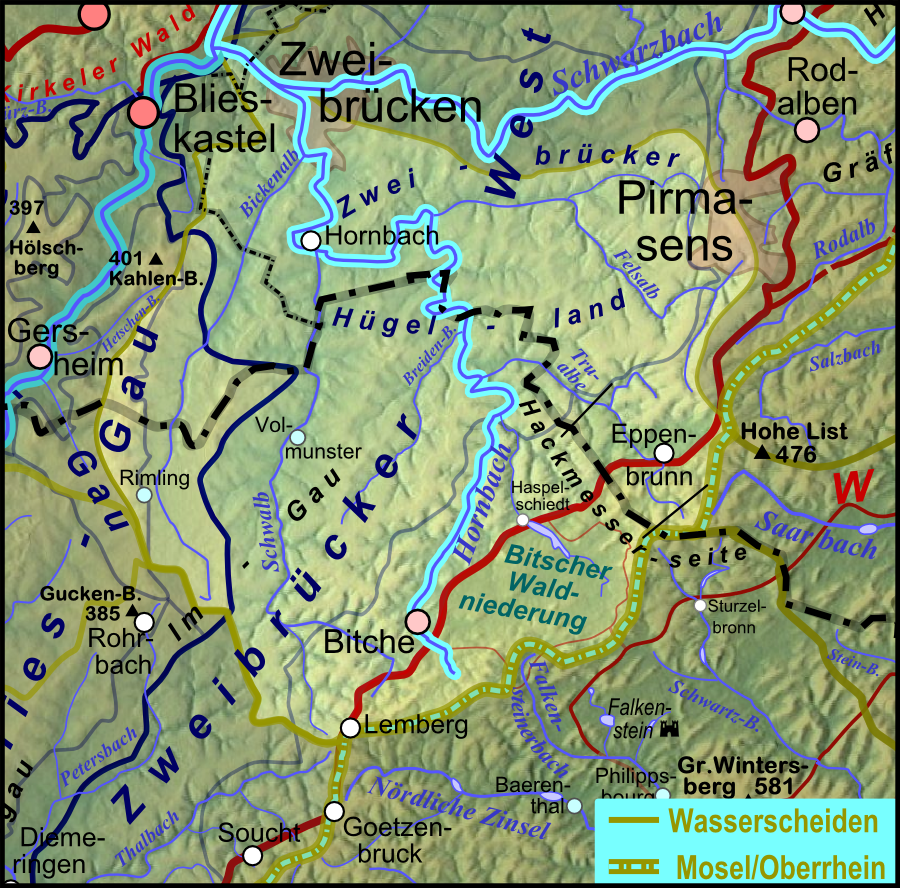

Location
- Countries: France and Germany
- Region: Grand Est
- State: Rhineland-Palatinate

Physical characteristics
- Source: Entenbaechelthal
  - location: Bitche, Moselle (France)
  - coordinates: 49.0245°N 7.4436°E
  - elevation: 315 m (1,033 ft)
- Mouth: Zweibrücken, RP (Germany)
  - location: Schwarzbach
  - coordinates: 49°15′17″N 7°20′12″E
  - elevation: 219 m (719 ft)
- Length: 33 km (21 mi)
- Basin size: 150 km^{2} (58 mi^{2})

Basin features
- Progression: Schwarzbach→ Blies→ Saar→ Moselle→ Rhine→ North Sea
- Landmarks: Hasselfurth Pond, Citadel of Bitche
- Tributaries
  - left: Lebach, Rothlambach, Schorbach, Hasselbach, Neubach, Kumper Bach, Bleischbach, Klassbach, Breidenbach, Weiherbach, Grosssteinbach, Wiesengraben, Muehlbach, Schwalb, Unterbeiwaldgraben, Bickenalb
  - right: Musbach, Roelbach, Schwartzenbach, Schweixer Bach, Trualbe/Schwarzbach, Strolbach, Altbach, Bottenbach, Felsalb, Kirschbach, Mauschbach, Buchholzgraben, Althornbach, Atzenbach
- Waterbodies: Entenbaechelweiher, Hasselfurther Weiher

The river Horn (French: Horn, pronounced [ɔʁn]；German: Hornbach, pronounced [ˈhɔʁnˌbax]) is a left tributary of Schwarzbach flowing through the department of Moselle, in northeastern France, and the state of Rhineland-Palatinate, in southwestern Germany.

The Horn's headwaters rise in the French town of Bitche, in the Moselle Department, following a north by north-eastern course, before forming a part of the border between France and Germany. As the Franco-German border takes a sharp turn to the west, the Horn continues into Germany. Here, it follows a roughly north-western course, ending in the German town of Zweibrücken, emptying into the Schwarzbach. Its length in France is 27.6 km (17.1 mi).

== See also ==
- List of rivers of Rhineland-Palatinate
