= Hornbach =

Hornbach may refer to:

- Hornbach, Germany, municipality in the Südwestpfalz district
- Hornbach (retailer), German DIY chain
- Hornbach, German name for the river Horn (Schwarzbach)
