= Allerbach =

Allerbach is the name of several rivers and streams in Germany:

- Allerbach (Bewer), tributary of the Bewer, near Deitersen, county of Northeim, Lower Saxony
- Allerbach (Bruchbach), tributary of the Bruchbach, near Hustedt, county of Celle, Lower Saxony
- Allerbach (Rappbode), tributary of the Rappbode (Rappbode Dam), near Trautenstein, county of Harz, Saxony-Anhalt
- Allerbach (Violenbach), tributary of the Violenbach, near Gerden, county of Osnabrück, Lower Saxony
- Allerbach (Warme Bode), tributary of the Warme Bode, near Tanne, county of Harz, Saxony-Anhalt
- Allerbach, alternative name for the Todbach, tributary of the Blies in St. Wendel, county of St. Wendel, Saarland
- Allerbach, alternative name for the Wallesbach, headstream of the Todbach in Hirstein and Namborn, county of St. Wendel, Saarland

== See also ==
- Aller (disambiguation)
