= Wadrill =

River in Germany

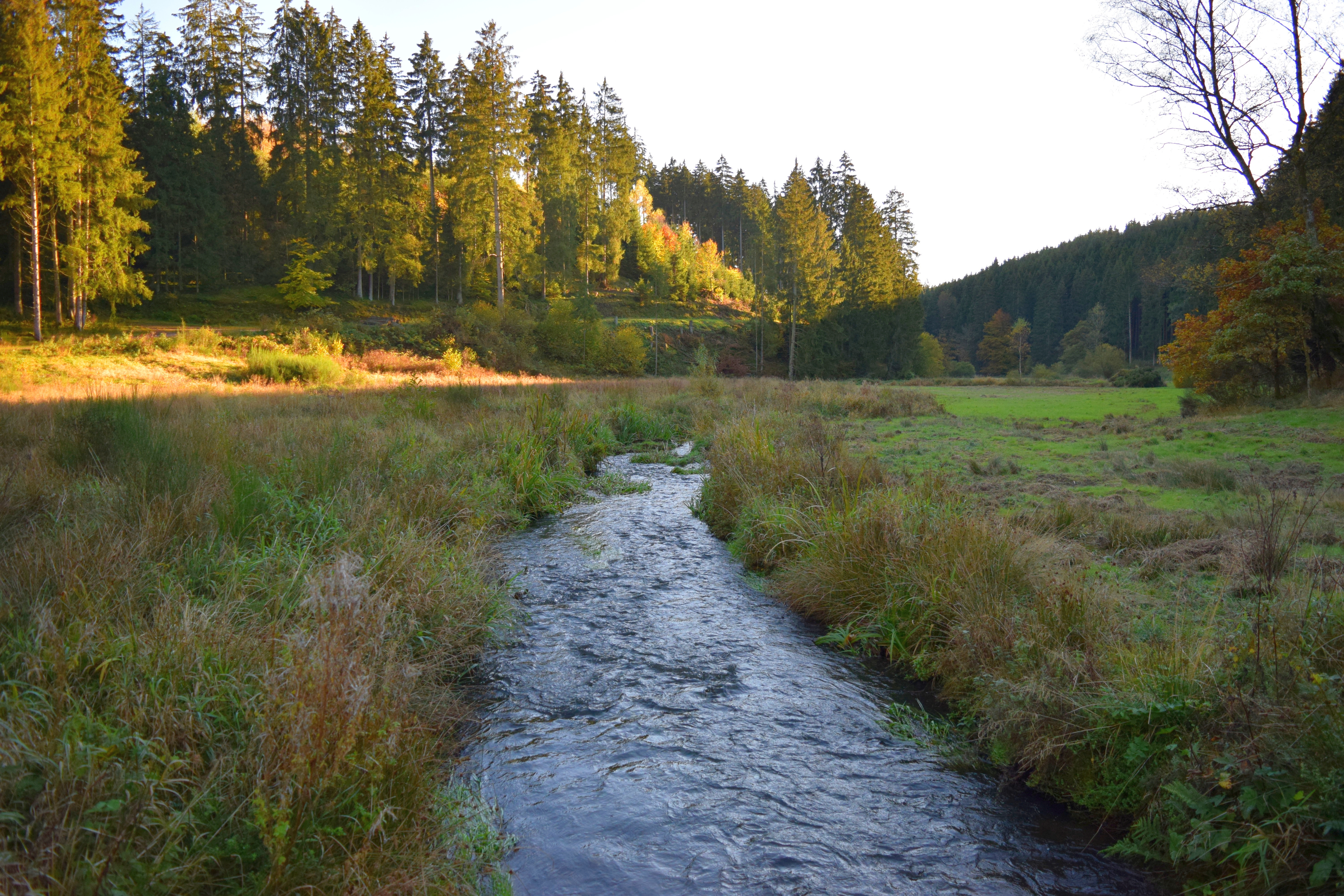
- The Wadrill near Reinsfeld

Location
- Country: Germany
- States: Saarland; Rhineland-Palatinate

Physical characteristics
- Source
  - location: Hunsrück
- Mouth
  - location: Prims
  - coordinates: 49.5248°N 6.8875°E
  - elevation: 261 m (856 ft)

Basin features
- Progression: Prims→ Saar→ Moselle→ Rhine→ North Sea

The Wadrill is a river of Saarland and Rhineland-Palatinate, Germany. It is a right tributary of the Prims, which it joins south of Wadern.

== See also ==
- List of rivers of Saarland
- List of rivers of Rhineland-Palatinate
