= Erbach (Blies) =

River in Germany

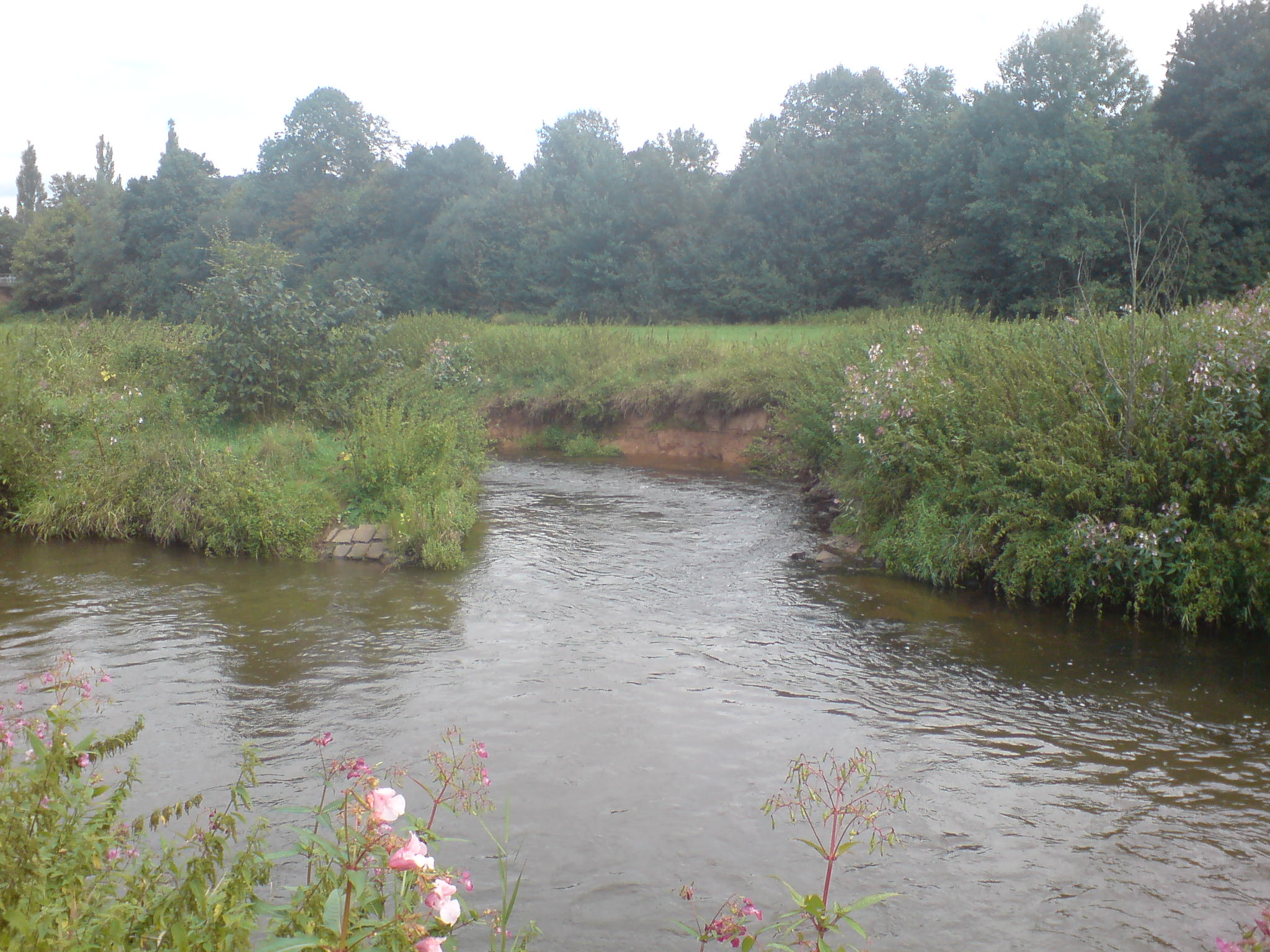
- The mouth of the Erbach in the Mastau in the Blies

Location
- Country: Germany
- State: Saarland
- City: Homburg

Physical characteristics
- Mouth
  - location: Blies
  - coordinates: 49.2882°N 7.3119°E
- Length: 16.12 km (10.02 mi)

Basin features
- Progression: Blies→ Saar→ Moselle→ Rhine→ North Sea
- Tributaries
  - left: Ebersbach, Reichersbach, Eisenkautbach
  - right: Felsbach, Taubentalbach, Schmalaugraben, Erbacher Schmalaubach
- Waterbodies: Schloßweiher, Brückweiher, Möhlwoog

Erbach (German pronunciation: [ˈɛʁbax]) is a river of Saarland, Germany. It flows into the Blies near Homburg.

== See also ==
- List of rivers of Saarland
