= Oster (Blies) =

River in Germany

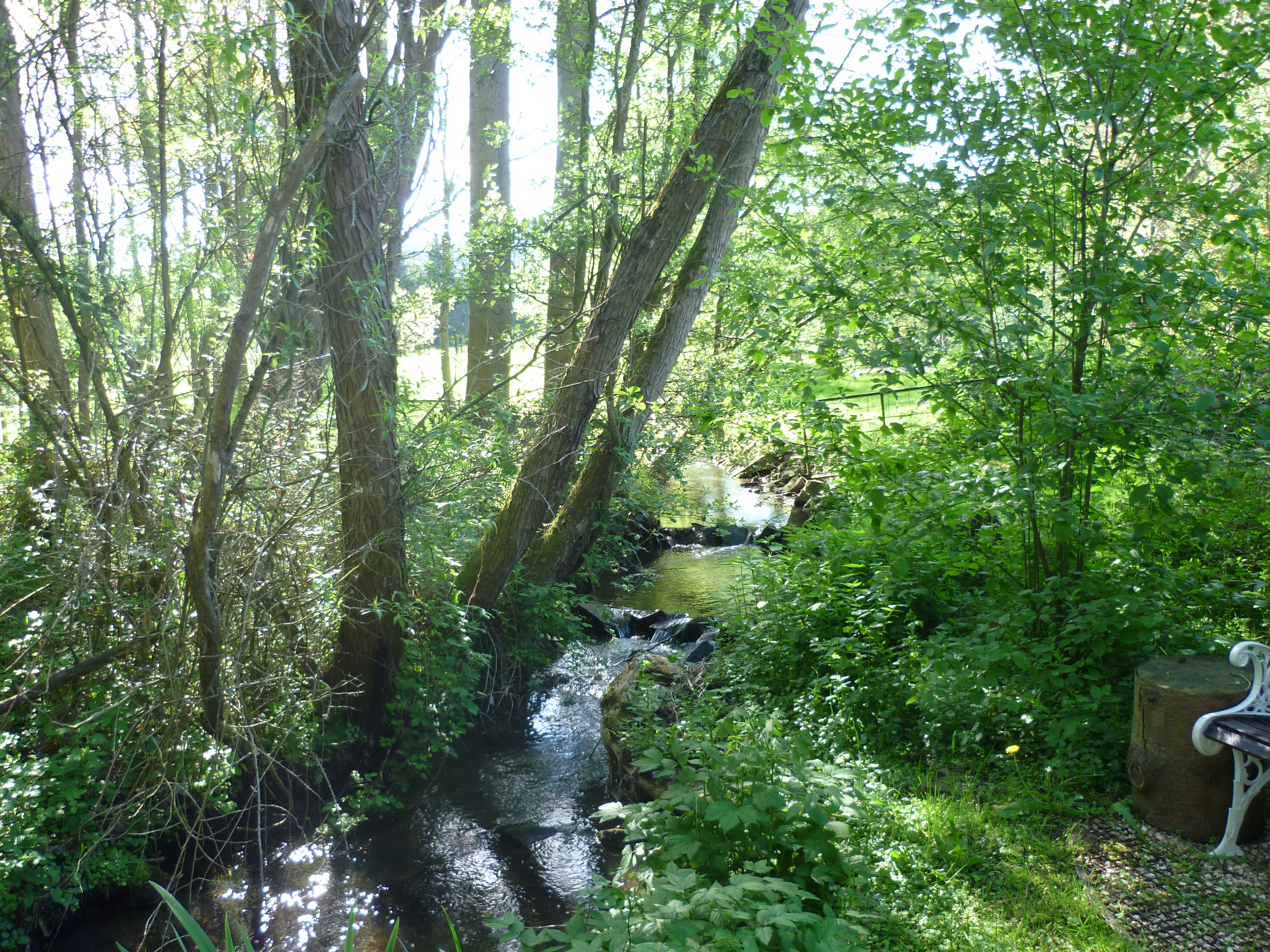

Location
- Country: Germany
- State: Saarland

Physical characteristics
- Source
  - elevation: 453 m (1,486 ft)
- Mouth
  - location: Blies
  - coordinates: 49°22′19″N 07°11′17″E
  - elevation: 243 m (797 ft)
- Length: 30.7 km (19.1 mi)

Basin features
- Progression: Blies→ Saar→ Moselle→ Rhine→ North Sea
- Tributaries
  - left: Dünkelbach, Selchenbach, Bubach
  - right: Wilmesbach, Betzelbach, Lautenbach

The Oster is a river of Saarland, Germany. It flows into the Blies near Neunkirchen.

== Course ==
The Oster originates in the Saar-Hunsrück Nature Park, a little west-northwest of Oberkirchen. It flows from the Oster spring, southeast of the Füsselberg and northwest of the Mittelberg, in the northern foothills of the Weiselberg.

Initially, the Oster, flows along the Ostertal Railway from Fürth east to Oberkirchen and then south through the place where it the Oberkirchen Talbrücke crosses. From then on the stream continues in this direction to Hoof and then along the B420 via Marth and Niederkirchen to Werschweiler, where it leaves the Saar-Hunsrück Nature Park. It then flows through Dörrenbach and Fürth to Hangard.

Finally, the Oster, now flowing westward for its last few kilometers, joins the south-flowing Blies at Wiebelskirchen after a total drop of 210 metres (690 ft).

== History ==
After being straightened over long stretches in the 1930s, 60s, and 70s, the Oster has been renaturalized piecemeal since 1990. In 1934 the Ostertal Railway, named for the stream, was constructed along its course.

== See also ==
- List of rivers of Saarland
