= Köllerbach =

Köllerbach may refer to:

- Köllerbach (Saar), a river of Saarland, Germany, tributary of the Saar
- Köllerbach, a district of the town Püttlingen in Saarland, Germany
