= Lambsbach =

River in Germany

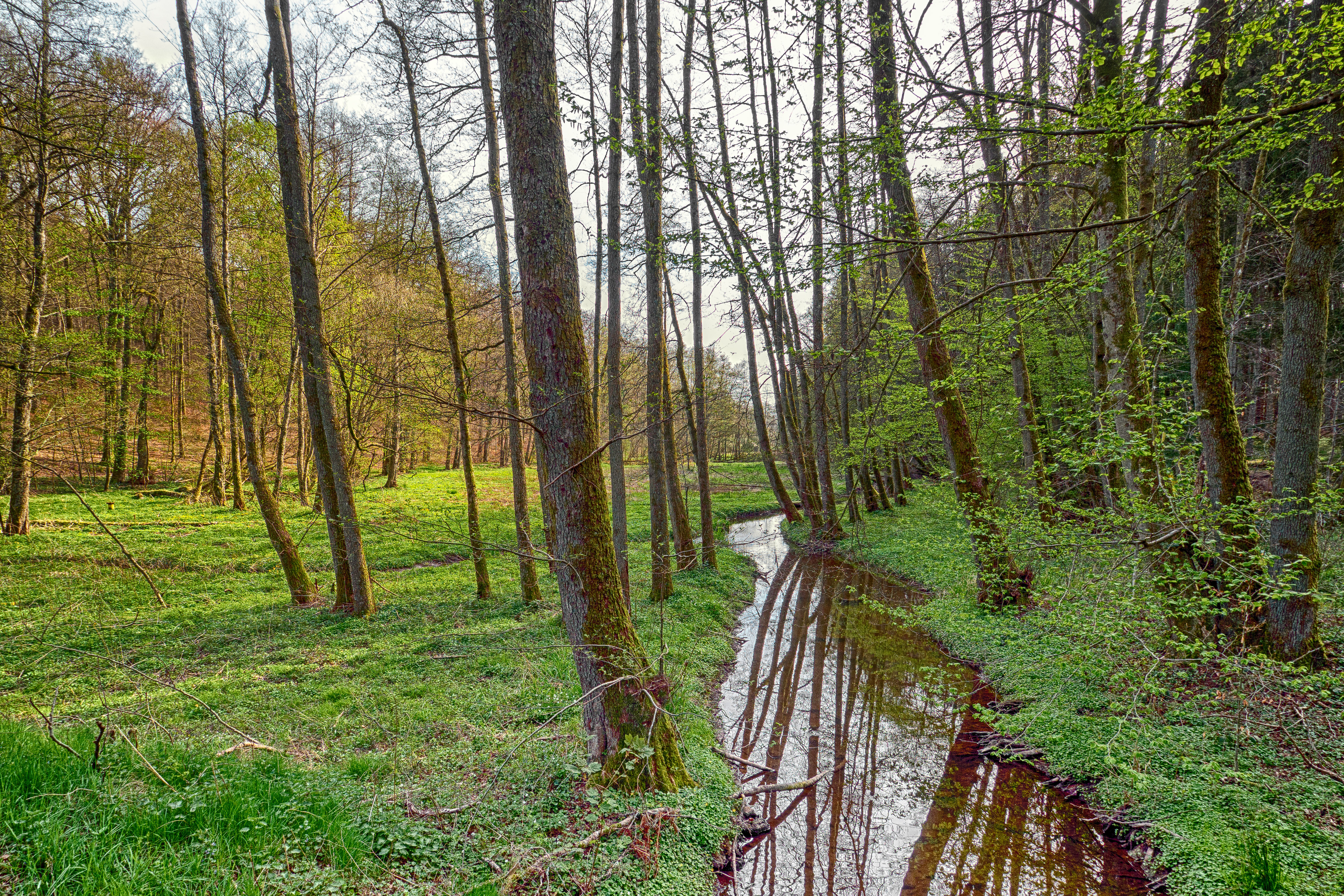
- Lambsbach Valley Nature Reserve

Location
- Country: Germany
- States: Rhineland-Palatinate; Saarland

Physical characteristics
- Mouth
  - location: Blies
  - coordinates: 49°17′07″N 7°18′48″E

Basin features
- Progression: Blies→ Saar→ Moselle→ Rhine→ North Sea

Lambsbach is a river in southwestern Germany. It flows into the Blies near Homburg.

== Course ==
The Lambsbach stream originates in the small village of Lambsborn, the stream flows through the Lambsbach Valley, a narrow, largely natural meadow valley framed on both sides by wooded hills. A small part of the valley is designated as the Lambsbach Valley Nature Reserve.

Further downstream, the Lambsbach flows through Bechhofen and west of the higher-lying Käshofen . At the L462 state road, the Lambsbach crosses the states and continues in Saarland through Kirrberg, past Emilienruhe, Ebersberg, and Audenkellerhof. Finally, it forms the boundary between Schwarzenbach and Schwarzenacker .

The stream flows into the Blies between Schwarzenbach, Schwarzenacker and Wörschweiler, just a few meters from the Erbach confluence in the Mastau.

== See also ==
- List of rivers of Rhineland-Palatinate
- List of rivers of Saarland
