= Theel =

River in Germany

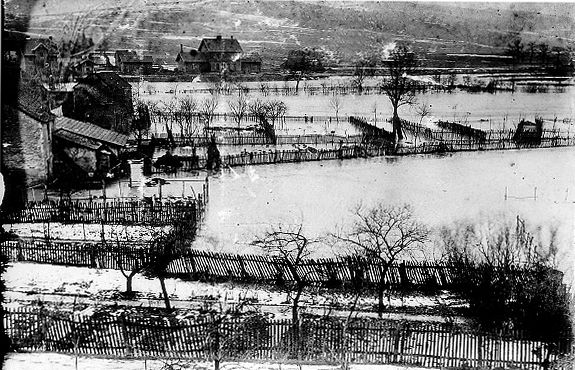

Location
- Country: Germany
- State: Saarland

Physical characteristics
- Mouth
  - location: Prims
  - coordinates: 49.3937°N 6.8501°E

Basin features
- Progression: Prims→ Saar→ Moselle→ Rhine→ North Sea

Theel is a river of Saarland, Germany. It is 25.4 km long and flows into the Prims near Lebach.

== See also ==
- List of rivers of Saarland
