= Leukbach =

River in Germany

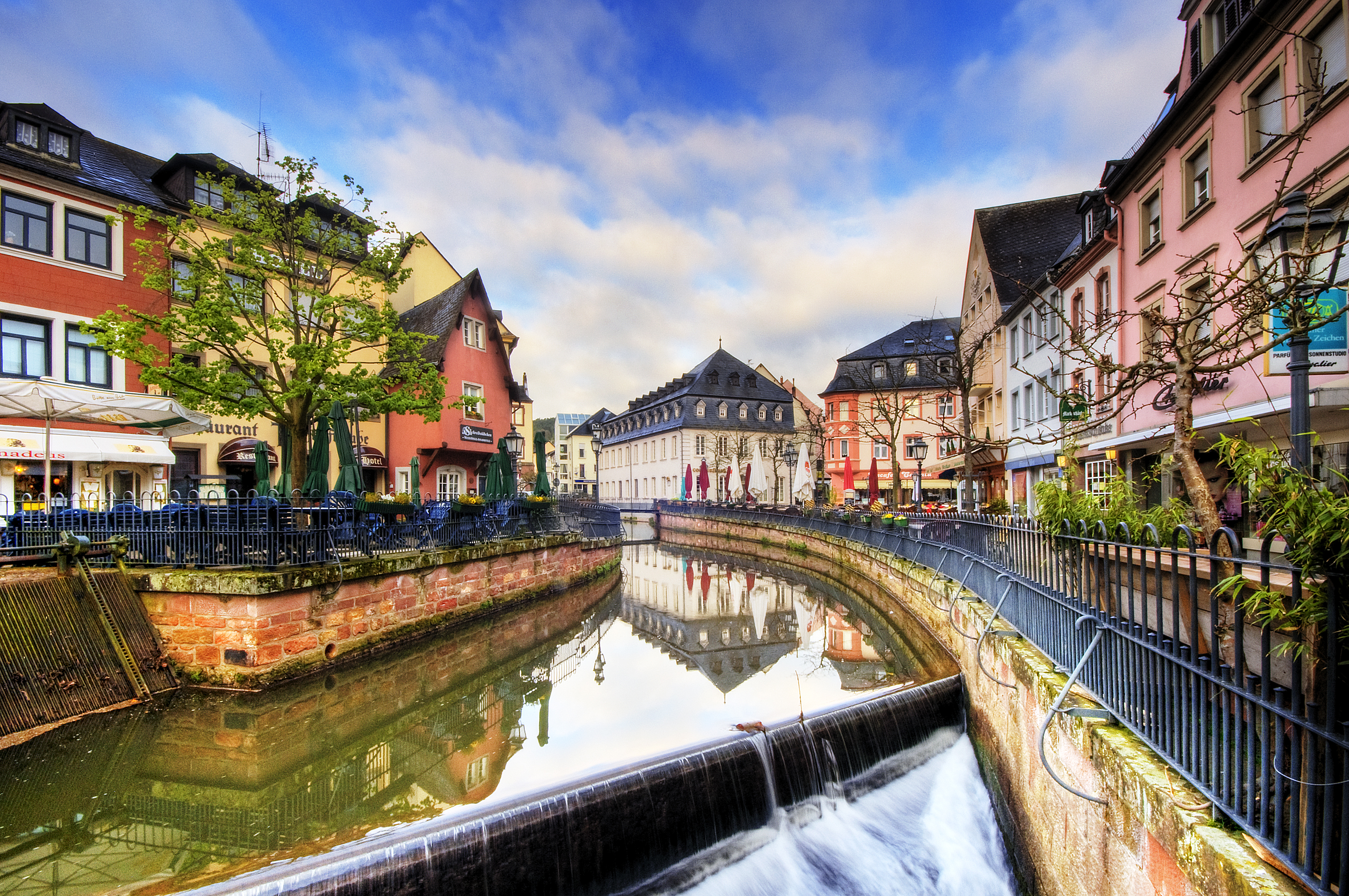
- The Leukbach in Saarburg

Location
- Country: Germany
- States: Saarland, Rhineland-Palatinate

Physical characteristics
- Mouth
  - location: Saar
  - coordinates: 49.6078°N 6.5536°E
  - elevation: Approx. 145 m above sea level
- Length: 15 km (9.3 mi)
- Basin size: 87.9 km^{2} (33.9 sq mi)

Basin features
- Progression: Saar→ Moselle→ Rhine→ North Sea

Leukbach, also Leuk, is a river of Saarland and Rhineland-Palatinate, Germany. It is 15 km (9.3 mi) long. The catchment area is 87.9 km^{2} (33.9 sq mi). It flows into the Saar in Saarburg.

It is a left-bank tributary of the Saar. The source is in Eft, in the municipality of Perl, Saarland. The Leukbach flows through the municipalities of Perl, Mettlach, Kirf, Freudenburg, Trassem and Saarburg. The Leuk is fed by water from 26 smaller streams. These include, for example, the Lohbach, Mandelbach and Zinnbach near the town of Saarburg.

== See also ==
- List of rivers of Rhineland-Palatinate
- List of rivers of Saarland
