= Gailbach (Blies) =

River in Germany and France

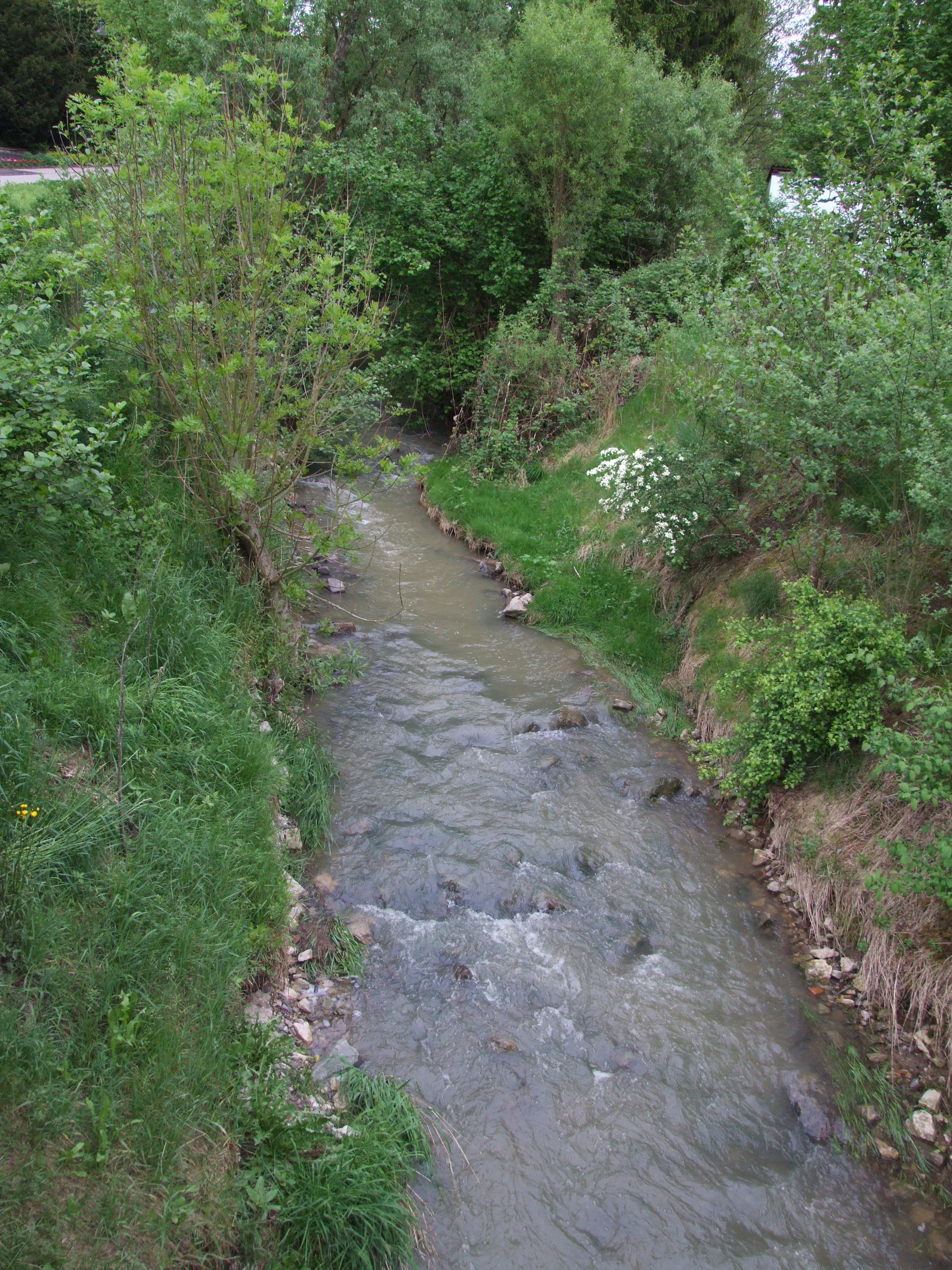
- The Gailbach in Niedergailbach

- Location within Germany Location within Saarland

Location
- Countries: France and Germany
- Region: Grand Est
- State: Saarland

Physical characteristics
- Source
  - location: Obergailbach
- Mouth
  - location: Gersheim
  - coordinates: 49.1383°N 7.2000°E

Basin features
- Progression: Blies→ Saar→ Moselle→ Rhine→ North Sea
- Tributaries
  - right: Wallringerbach

Gailbach is a river of Moselle, France and Saarland, Germany. It flows into the Blies near Niedergailbach. Its course within France is 3.3 km (2.1 mi) long.

== See also ==
- List of rivers of Saarland
- List of rivers of France
