= Todbach =

River in Germany

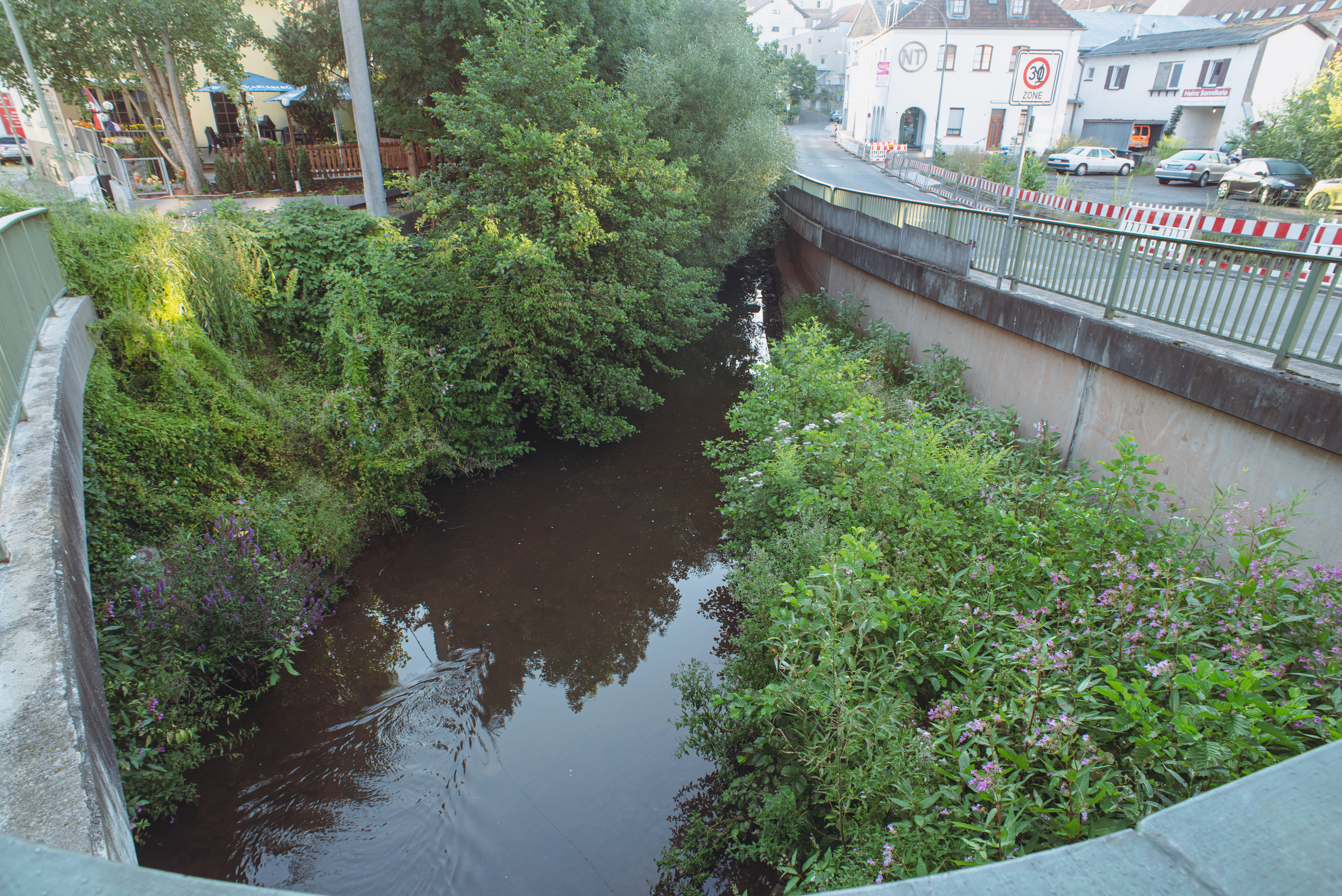
- The Todbach in St. Wendel

Location
- Country: Germany
- State: Saarland

Physical characteristics
- Mouth
  - location: Blies
  - coordinates: 49°28′09″N 7°10′01″E

Basin features
- Progression: Blies→ Saar→ Moselle→ Rhine→ North Sea

Todbach is a river of Saarland, Germany. It flows into the Blies in Sankt Wendel. It forms west of the Namborn at around 297m elevation and has a length around 13.1km.

== See also ==
- List of rivers of Saarland
