= Nied =

River in Germany and France

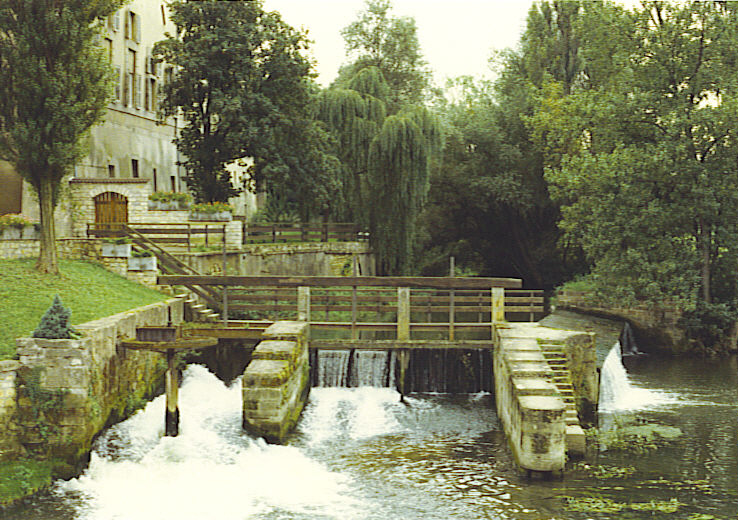
- The Nied at Bouzonville

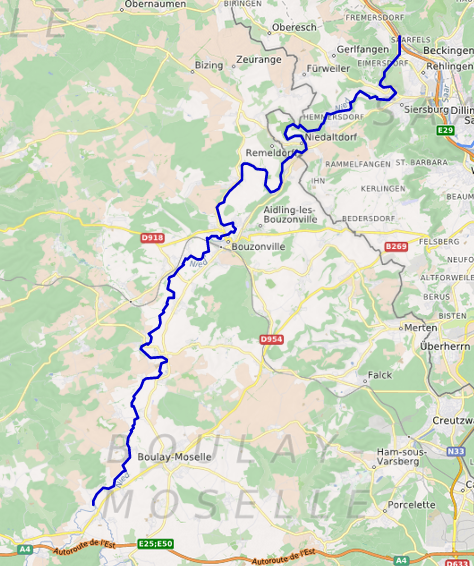
- Course of the Nied from Condé-Northen

Location
- Countries: France and Germany

Physical characteristics
- Source
  - location: Lorraine
- Mouth
  - location: Saar
  - coordinates: 49°23′39″N 6°39′58″E
- Length: 114 km (71 mi)
- Basin size: 1,370 km^{2} (530 mi^{2})
- Discharge
  - average: 13 m^{3}/s (460 cu ft/s)

Basin features
- Progression: Saar→ Moselle→ Rhine→ North Sea

The Nied (German pronunciation: [niːt]; French pronunciation: [nje]) is a river in Lorraine, France, and Saarland, Germany. It is a left tributary of the Saar. It is formed where two streams converge: the Nied allemande ("German Nied") and the Nied française ("French Nied"), which join in Condé-Northen.

The "Nied française" is the bigger of the two, with a length of 59 kilometres (37 mi), and its source is near Morhange. Another town on the "Nied française" is Pange. The other stream, the "Nied allemande" is 58 kilometres (36 mi) long, with its source in Seingbouse, east of Saint-Avold. Another town on the Nied allemande is Faulquemont.

The Nied itself is 55 kilometres (34 mi) long, of which 16 kilometres (10 mi) are in Germany. It flows through Bouzonville, and joins the Saar in Rehlingen-Siersburg.

== See also ==
- List of rivers of Saarland
- List of rivers of France
