= Ellbach (Saar) =

River in Germany

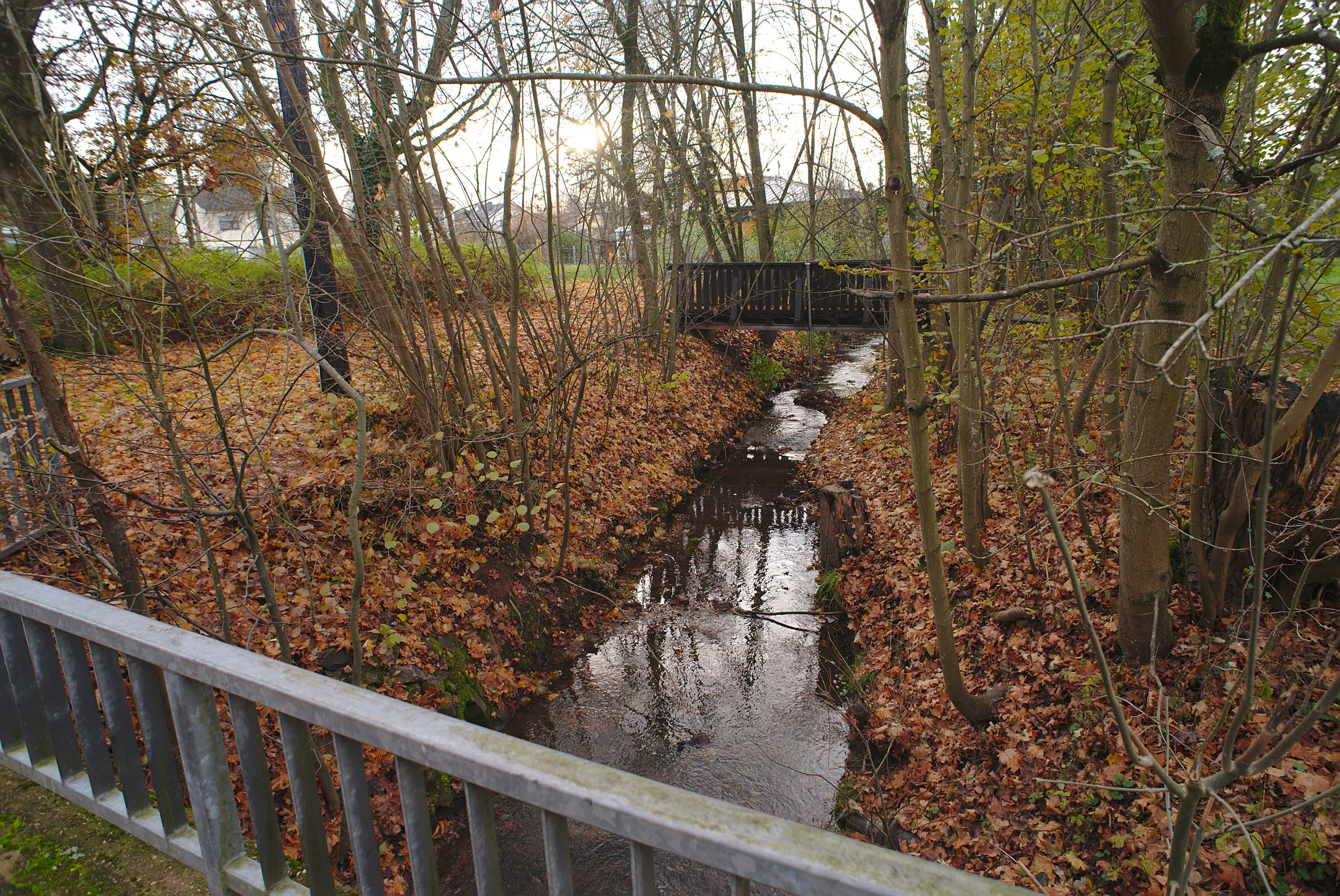

Location
- Country: Germany
- State: Saarland

Physical characteristics
- Mouth
  - location: Saar
  - coordinates: 49.3286°N 6.7378°E

Basin features
- Progression: Saar→ Moselle→ Rhine→ North Sea

Ellbach is a river of Saarland, Germany. It is a tributary of the Saar and is 8 kilometers long.

== See also ==
- List of rivers of Saarland
