= Condé-Northen =

- Commune
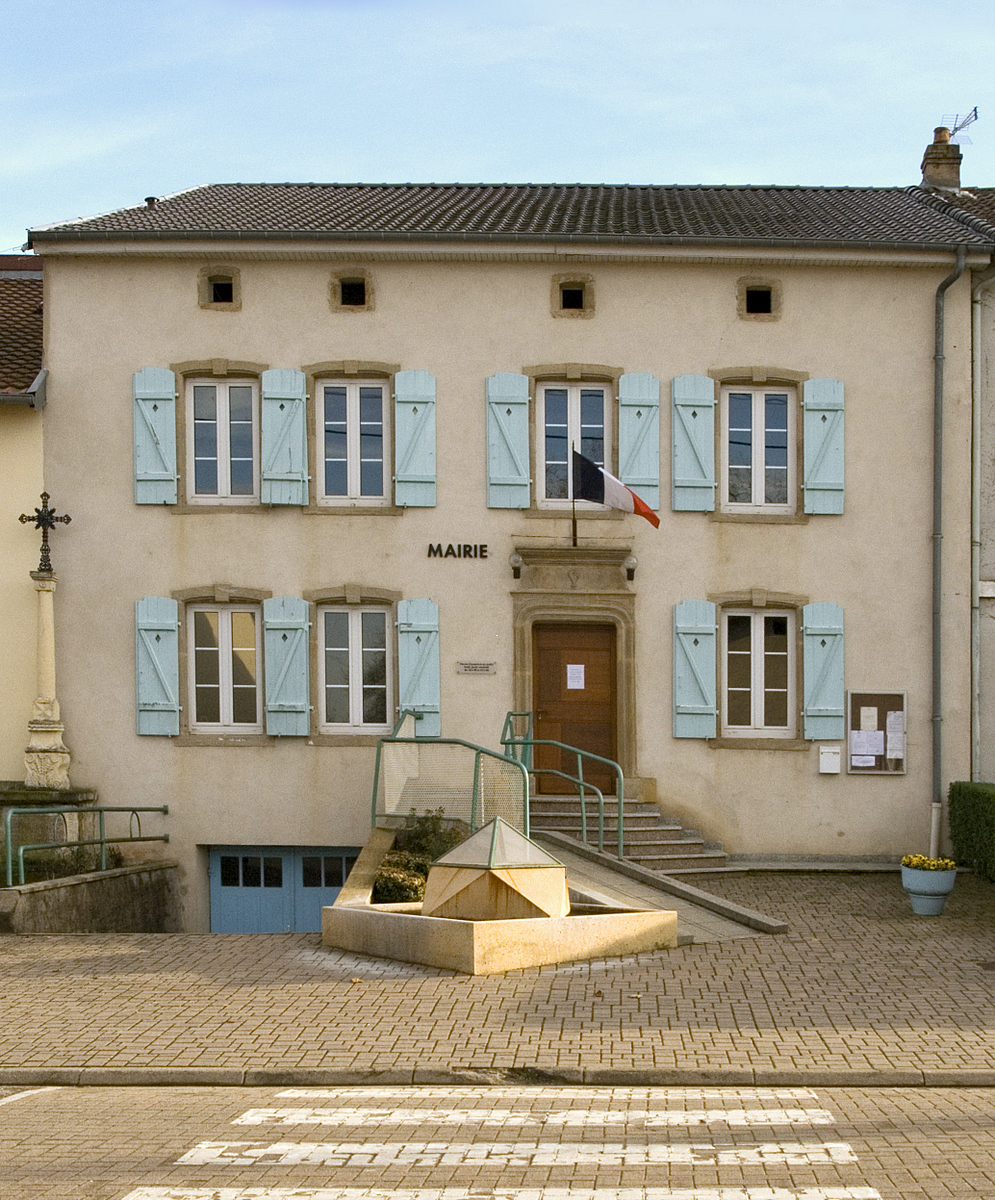
- Mairie de Condé-Northen

- Coat of arms
- Location of Condé-Northen
- Location within France Location within Grand Est
- Coordinates: 49°09′19″N 6°26′00″E
- Country: France
- Region: Grand Est
- Department: Moselle
- Arrondissement: Forbach-Boulay-Moselle
- Canton: Boulay-Moselle
- Intercommunality: CC Houve-Pays Boulageois

Government
  - Mayor (2020–2026): Patrick Pierre
- Area^{1}: 10.92 km^{2} (4.22 sq mi)
- Elevation: 205 m (673 ft)
- Highest elevation: 290 m (950 ft)
- Lowest elevation: 204 m (669 ft)
- Population (2023): 737
  - Density: 67.5/km^{2} (175/sq mi)
- Time zone: UTC+01:00 (CET)
  - Summer (DST): UTC+02:00 (CEST)
- INSEE/Postal code: 57150 /57220
- ^{1} French Land Register data, which excludes lakes, ponds, glaciers > 1 km^{2} (0.386 sq mi or 247 acres) and river estuaries.

Condé-Northen (German: Contchen-Northen) is a commune in the Moselle department in Grand Est in north-eastern France.

Localities of the commune: Condé (German: Contchen), Northen (German: Northen), Loutremange (German: Lautermingen), Pontigny (German: Niedbrücken).

Condé-Northen is located on the road from Saarlouis to Metz (D 954), about five kilometers southwest of Boulay-Moselle and about 30 kilometers from the border with Saarland. The two source rivers of the Nied, the German Nied (Nied Allemande) and the French Nied (Nied Française), unite in Condé-Northen.

== See also ==
- Communes of the Moselle department
