= Rohrbach (Saar) =

River in Germany

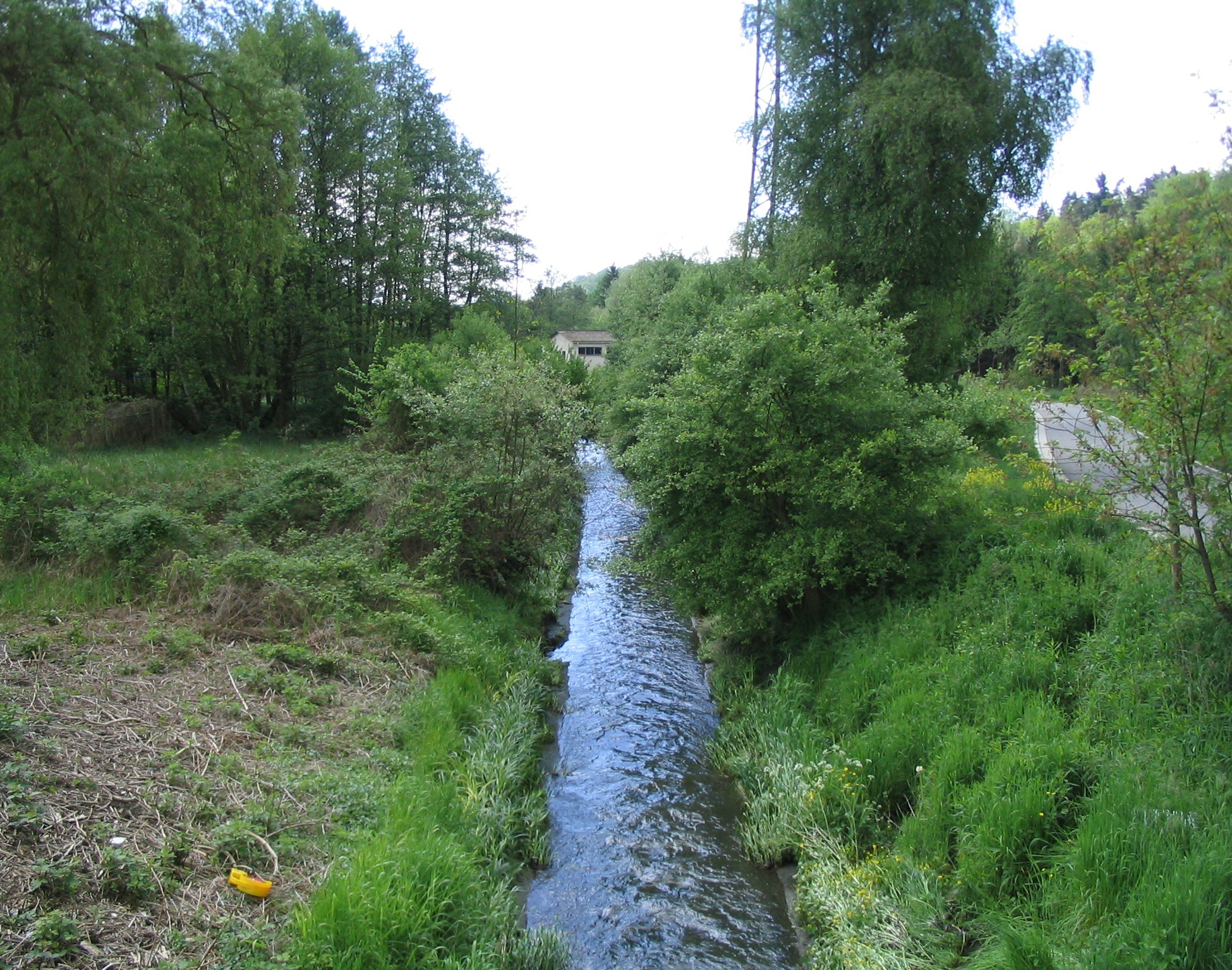

Location
- Country: Germany
- States: Saarland

Physical characteristics
- Mouth
  - location: Saar
  - coordinates: 49°12′41″N 7°01′29″E

Basin features
- Progression: Saar→ Moselle→ Rhine→ North Sea

Rohrbach is a river of Saarland, Germany. It flows into the Saar near Saarbrücken.

== See also ==
- List of rivers of Saarland
