= Würzbach =

River in Germany

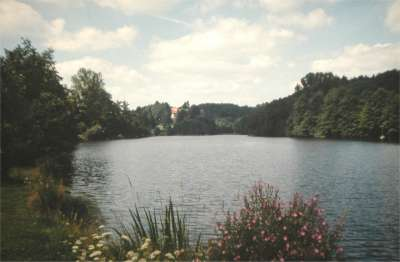

Location
- Country: Germany
- State: Saarland

Physical characteristics
- Mouth
  - location: Blies
  - coordinates: 49.2464°N 7.2661°E

Basin features
- Progression: Blies→ Saar→ Moselle→ Rhine→ North Sea

Würzbach is a river of Saarland, Germany. It flows into the Blies in Blieskastel.

== See also ==
- List of rivers of Saarland
