= Mutterbach (Blies) =

River in Germany

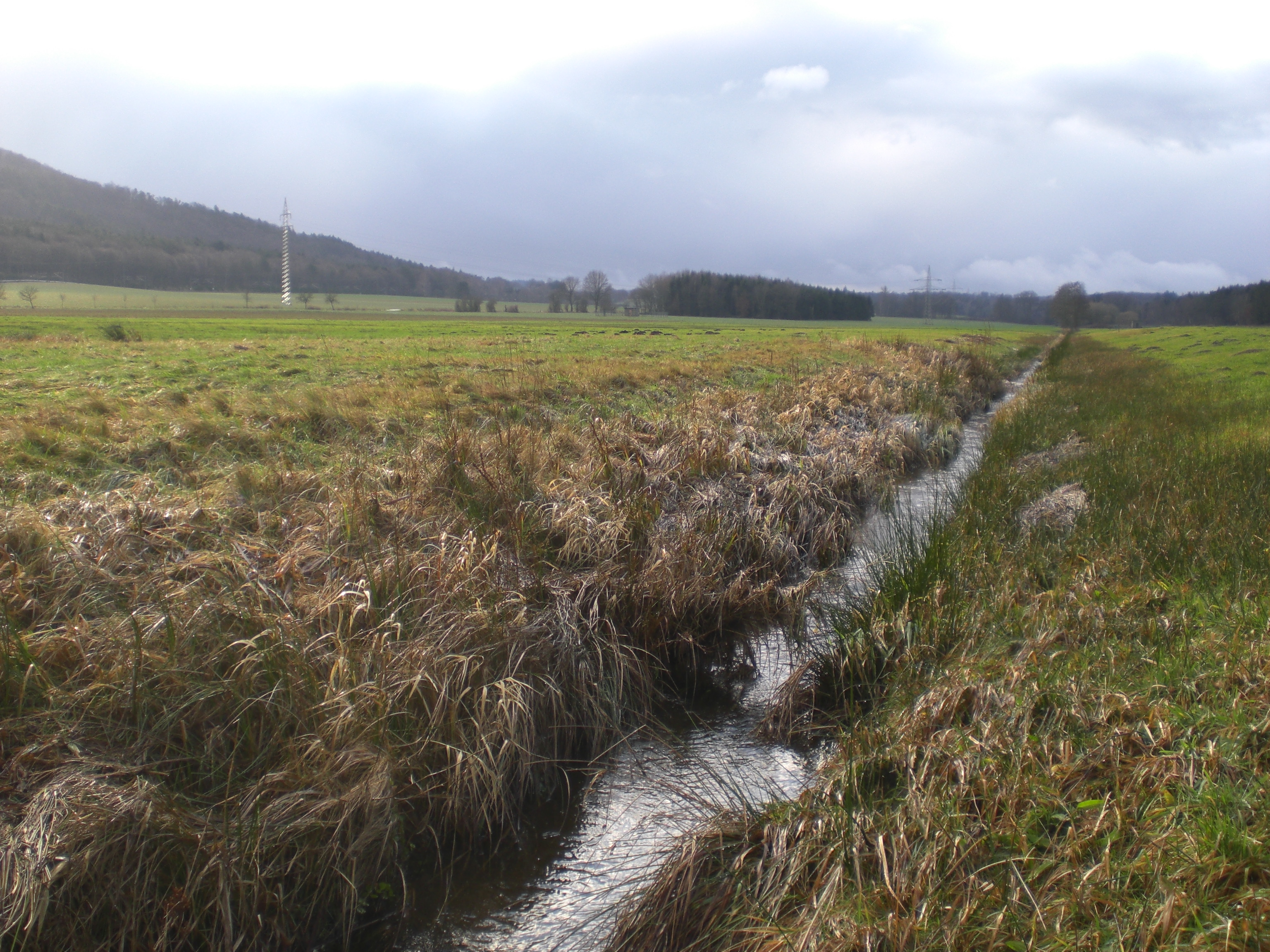

Location
- Country: Germany
- State: Saarland

Physical characteristics
- Mouth
  - location: Blies
  - coordinates: 49.3149°N 7.2822°E
- Length: 8.6 km (5.3 mi)

Basin features
- Progression: Blies→ Saar→ Moselle→ Rhine→ North Sea

The Mutterbach is a river of Saarland, Germany. It flows into the Blies in Limbach.

== See also ==
- List of rivers of Saarland
