= Wolfgang von Wurzbach =

Austrian literary historian, art historian and writer (1879-1957)

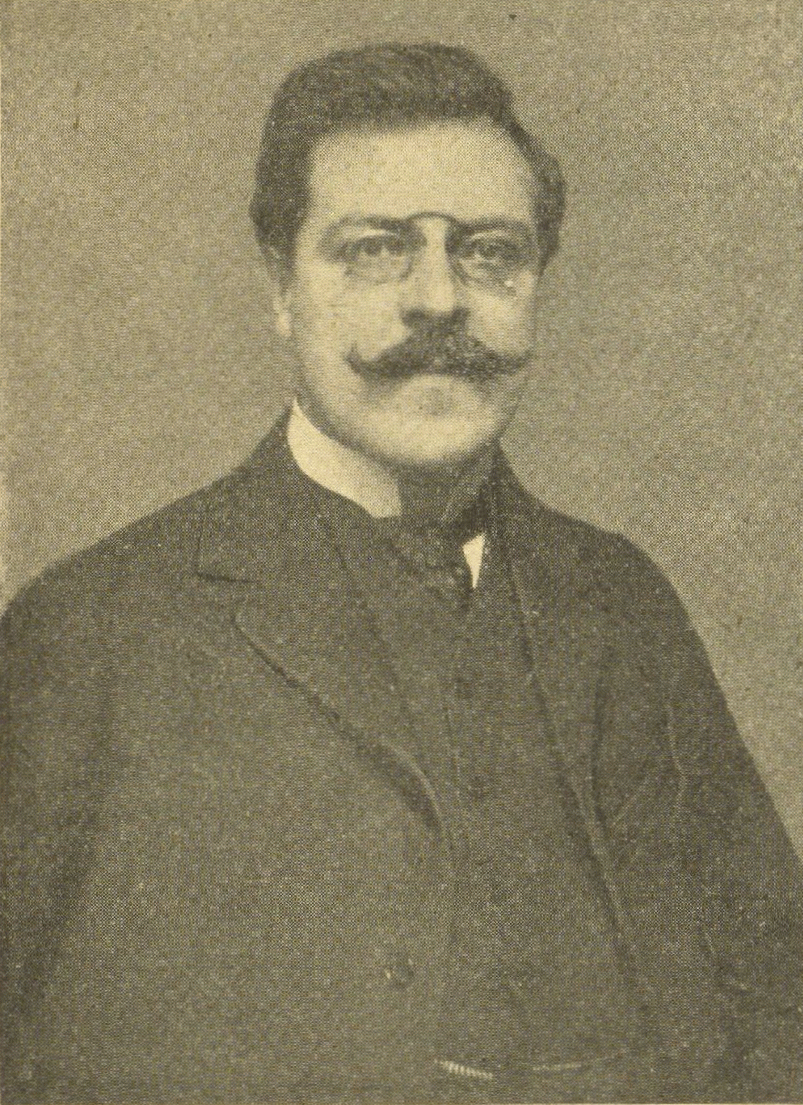
Wolfgang von Wurzbach

Wolfgang von Wurzbach (born 3 June 1879 in Vienna - 10 February 1957 ibid) was an Austrian Romance language scholar, literary scholar, and collector.

== Life and work ==
Alfred Wolfgang Ritter Wurzbach von Tannenberg was the son of Alfred von Wurzbach and Eugenie v. Wurzbach, the daughter of the banker Joseph Lippmann von Lissingen. He was a great-grandson of the Ljubljana lawyer Maximilian von Wurzbach, who had been raised to the nobility, and the grandson of the biographical lexicographer Constantin von Wurzbach. He studied at the University of Vienna, where he received his doctorate in 1902. He completed his habilitation1906/07 in Vienna for Romance literary history, 1911 expanded to Romance philology. From 1922 he was associate professor for Romance languages and literatures at the University of Vienna, was dismissed in 1938 because of his mother's Jewish descent and was reinstated as full professor for Romance philology in 1946. In 1950 he retired. In addition to Hispanic and French studies, he also published German and English studies.

Wurzbach was a well-known collector of souvenirs from Viennese personalities (autographs, portrait lithographs, medals). He bequeathed his collections to various museums in Vienna, including his important collection of Dutch paintings from the Academy of Fine Arts in Vienna, which he inherited from his maternal grandfather.
