= Köllerbach (Saar) =

River in Germany

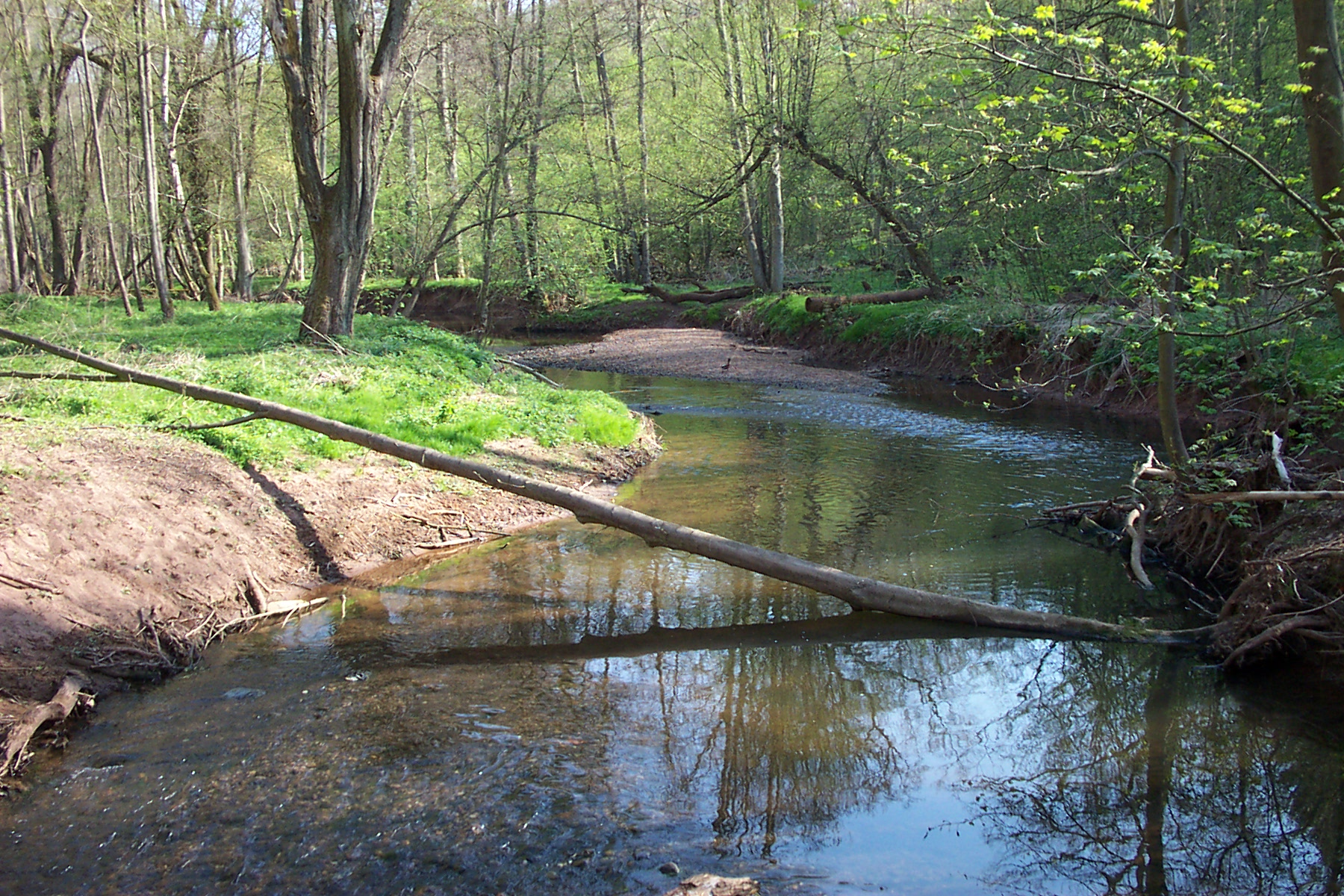

Location
- Country: Germany
- States: Saarland

Physical characteristics
- Mouth
  - location: Saar
  - coordinates: 49°14′48″N 06°51′40″E

Basin features
- Progression: Saar→ Moselle→ Rhine→ North Sea

Köllerbach is a river of Saarland, Germany. It is approximately 19 kilometres long and an orographically right-bank tributary of the Saar. The valley through which the Köllerbach flows is known as the Köllertal. The river rises east of Eiweiler and flows through Eiweiler, Heusweiler, Walpershofen, Etzenhofen, Köllerbach, and Püttlingen, before flowing into the Saar near Völklingen.

== See also ==
- List of rivers of Saarland
