= Wiesbach (Weil) =

River in Germany

Location
- Country: Germany
- State: Hesse

Physical characteristics
- Source
  - location: Between Hundstadt (a district of Grävenwiesbach) and Michelbach (a district of Usingen
  - coordinates: 50.3709°N 8.5114°E
- Mouth
  - location: Before Audenschmiede (a district of Weilmünster) into the Weil
  - coordinates: 50.4045°N 8.3916°E

Basin features
- Progression: Weil→ Lahn→ Rhine→ North Sea

Wiesbach (German pronunciation: [ˈviːsbax]) is a river of Hesse, Germany.

The Wiesbach springs between Hundstadt, a district of Grävenwiesbach, and Michelbach , a district of Usingen. It is a right tributary of the Weil before Audenschmiede, a district of Weilmünster.

== See also ==
- List of rivers of Hesse
