= Mutterbach (Main) =

River in Germany

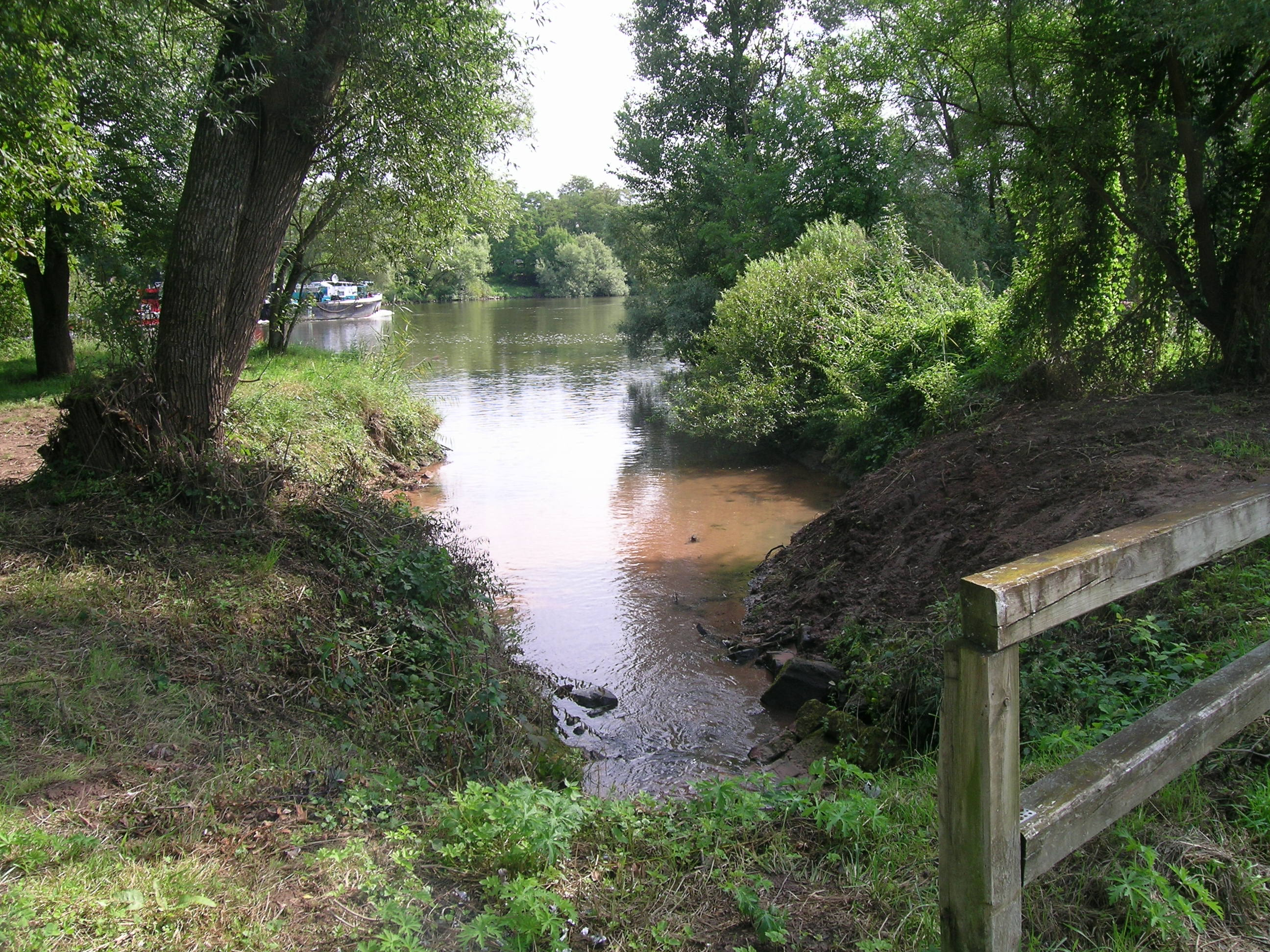
- Mouth of the Mutterbach into the Main

Location
- Country: Germany
- States: Hesse and Bavaria

Physical characteristics
- Source
  - location: South of the districts Breitenbrunn and Haingrund of Lützelbach
  - coordinates: 49.7547°N 9.0870°E
- Mouth
  - location: into the Main at Wörth am Main
  - coordinates: 49.8014°N 9.1510°E

Basin features
- Progression: Main→ Rhine→ North Sea

Mutterbach is a river of Hesse and Bavaria, Germany.

The Mutterbach springs south of the districts Breitenbrunn and Haingrund of Lützelbach. It is a left tributary of the Main in Wörth am Main.

== See also ==
- List of rivers of Hesse
- List of rivers of Bavaria
