= Wiesbach (Lech) =

River in Bavaria, Germany

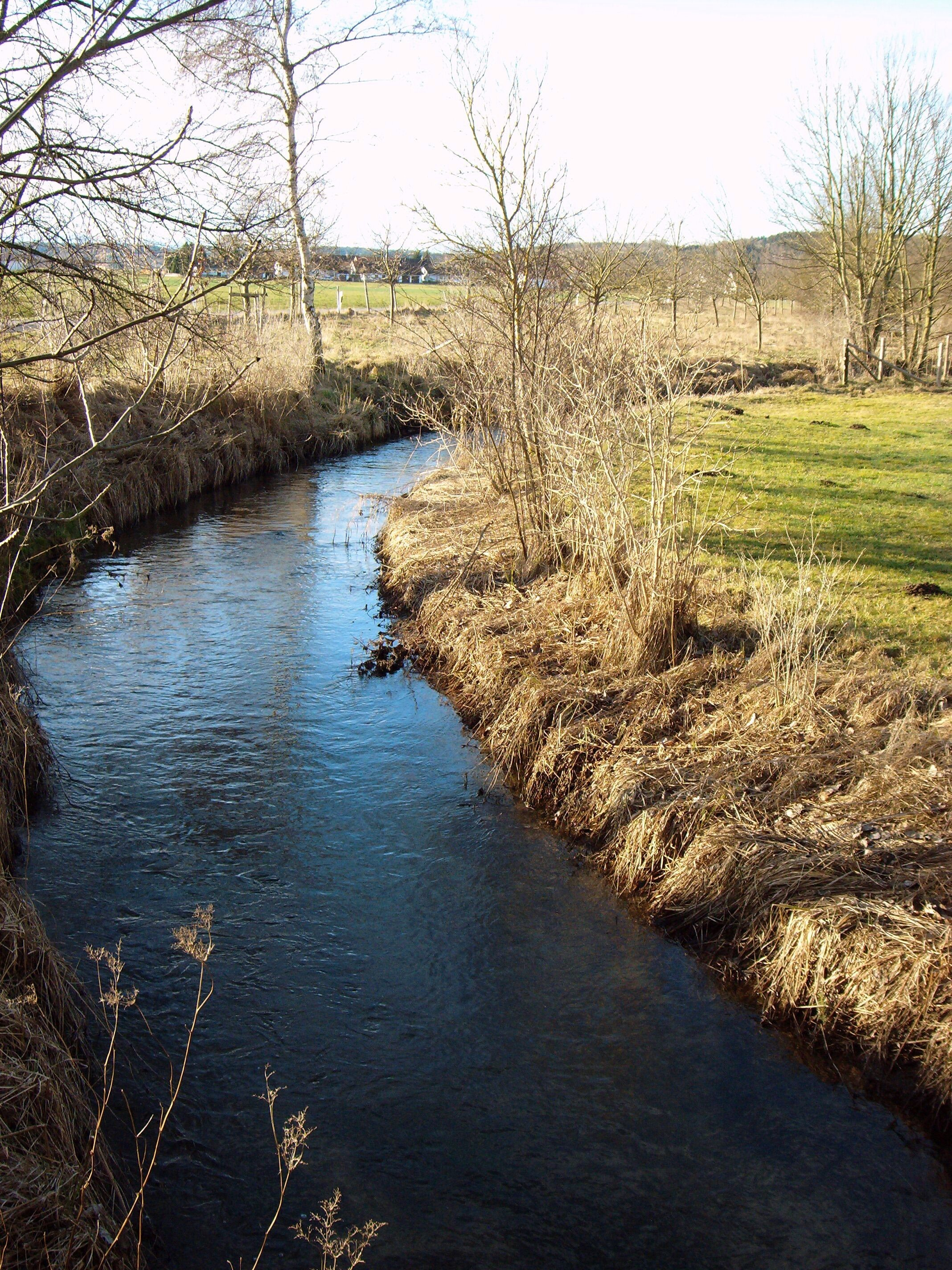
- The Wiesbach between Unterdießen and Oberdießen

Location
- Country: Germany
- State: Bavaria

Physical characteristics
- Mouth
  - location: Lech
  - coordinates: 48.0141°N 10.8740°E
- Length: 17.4 km (10.8 mi)

Basin features
- Progression: Lech→ Danube→ Black Sea

Wiesbach (German pronunciation: [ˈviːsbax]) is a river located in Bavaria, Germany. It flows into the Lech south of Landsberg am Lech.

== See also ==
- List of rivers of Bavaria
