= Blies =

River in France and Germany

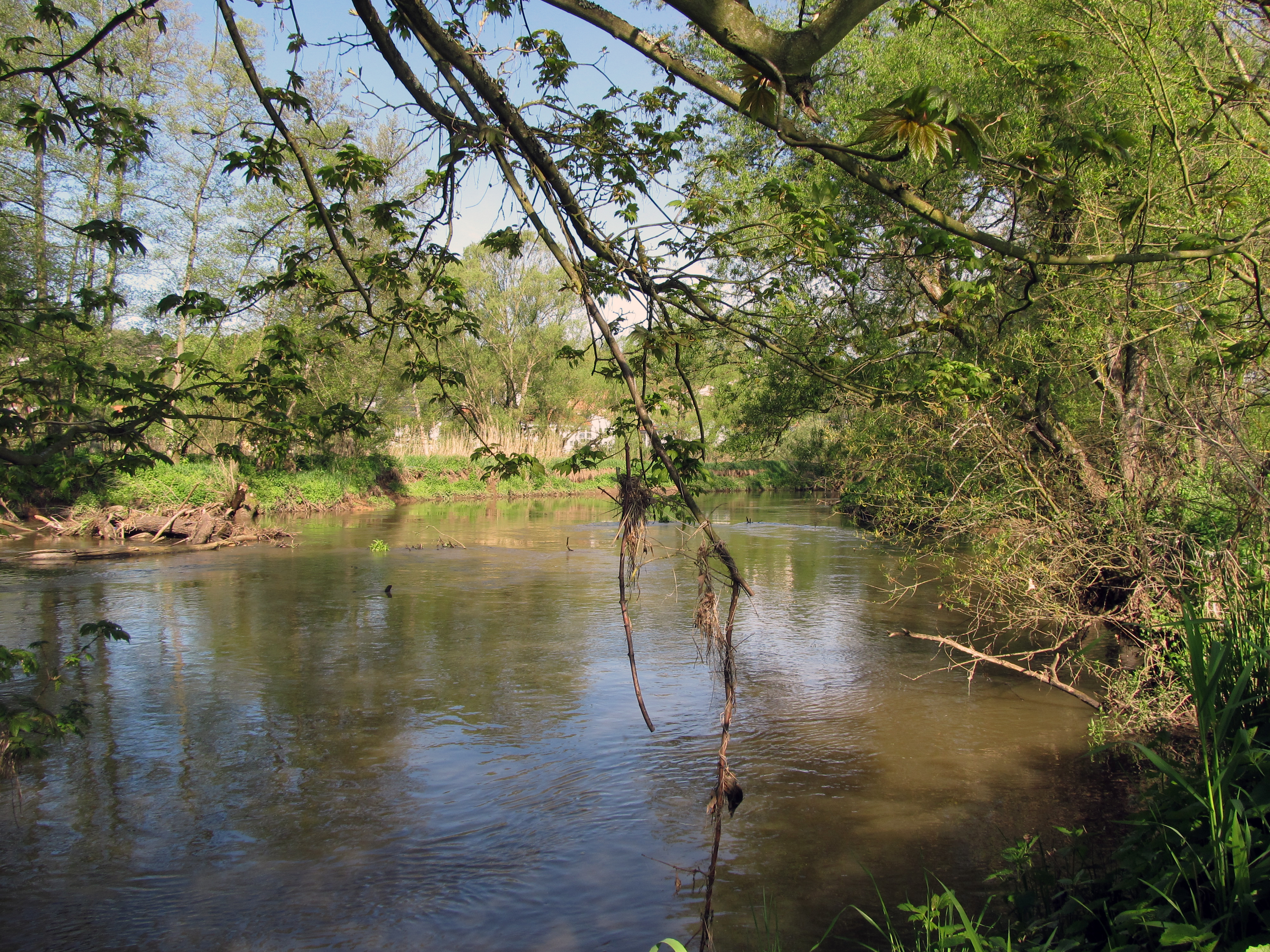
- The Blies at Blieskastel

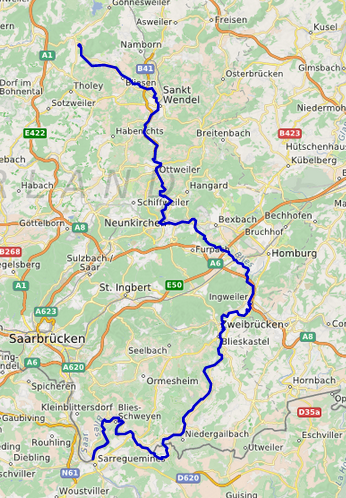

Location
- Countries: Germany; France

Physical characteristics
- Source
  - location: Saarland
  - elevation: 430 m (1,410 ft)
- Mouth
  - location: Saar
  - coordinates: 49°6′52″N 7°4′0″E
- Length: 99.5 km (61.8 mi)
- Basin size: 1,960 km^{2} (760 sq mi)

Basin features
- Progression: Saar→ Moselle→ Rhine→ North Sea
- Tributaries
  - left: Oster, Schwarzbach

The Blies (French pronunciation: [bliz]; German pronunciation: [bliːs]) is a right tributary of the Saar in southwestern Germany (Saarland) and northeastern France (Moselle). The Blies flows from three springs in the Hunsrück near Selbach, Germany. It is roughly 100 km long, ending in the French city of Sarreguemines. It flows through Sankt Wendel, Ottweiler, Neunkirchen, Bexbach, Homburg and Blieskastel (Blieskastel being named after the river). Its lower extent demarcates part of the Franco–German border. The section within France and on the French-German border is 19.7 km (12.2 mi) long.

== Tributaries ==
Tributaries of the Blies are, from source to mouth:

- Todbach (left)
- Oster (left)
- Mutterbach (right)
- Erbach (left)
- Lambsbach (left)
- Schwarzbach (left)
- Würzbach (right)
- Hetschenbach (left)
- Gailbach (left)
- Mandelbach (right)

== World War II ==
Fighting took place on the Blies during the Lorraine Campaign, fought from September to December 1944 by the Third United States Army, famously led by George S. Patton. The 35th Infantry Division fought along the Blies following its battle at Sarreguemines in early December, the former part of the larger assault on the West Wall.

== See also ==
- Blies-Ébersing (Fr)
- Blies-Schweyen (Fr)
- Blies-Guersviller (Fr)
- List of rivers of Saarland
