= Prims =

River in Germany

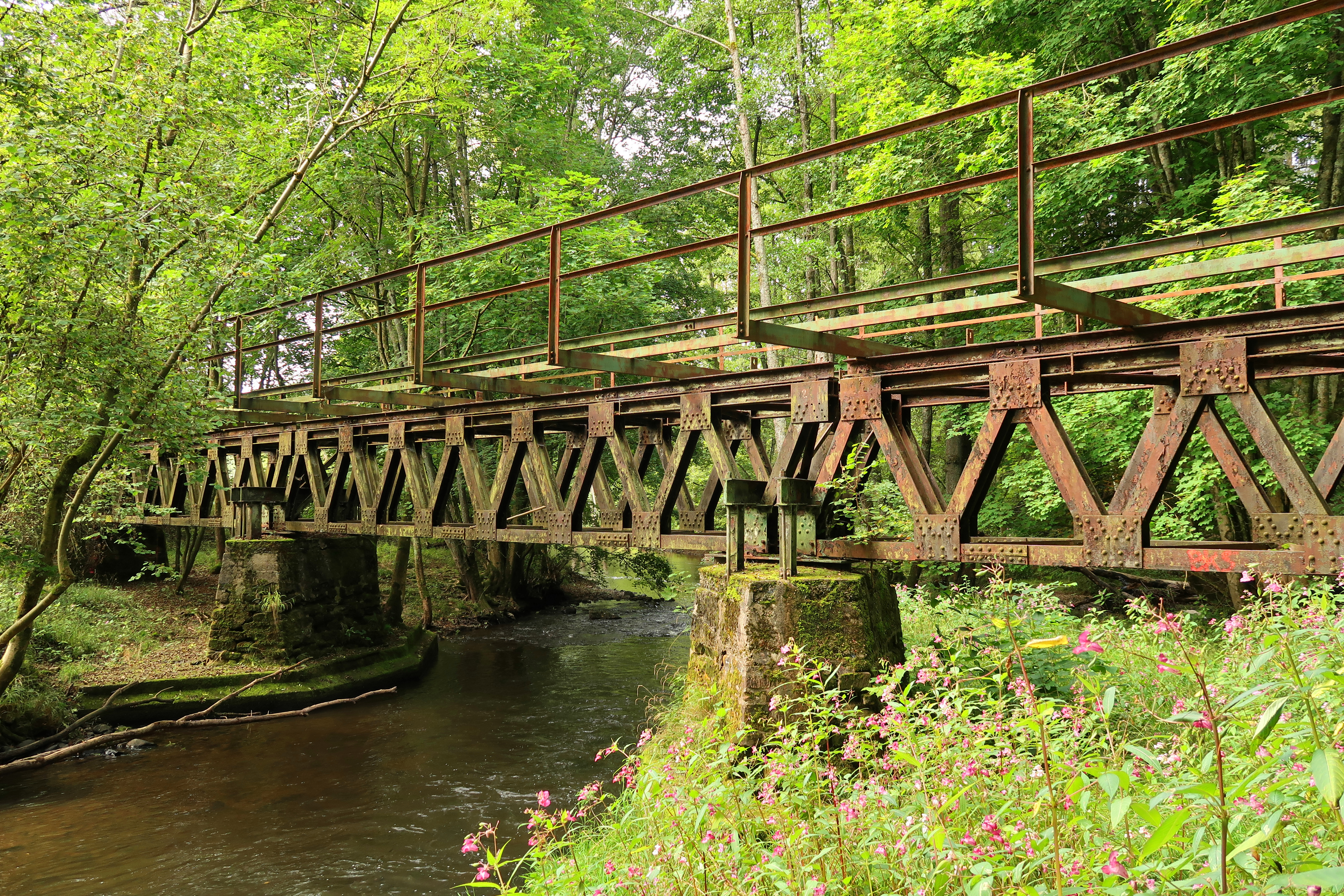
- Brige of an abandoned railway line over the Prims near Wadern

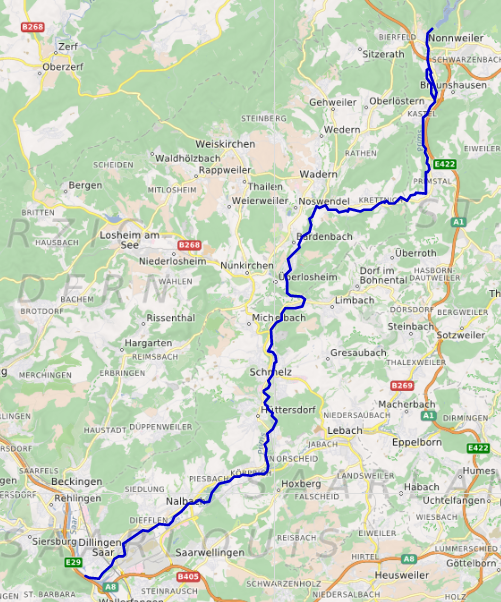

Location
- Country: Germany
- States: Rhineland-Palatinate, Saarland

Physical characteristics
- Source
  - location: Hunsrück
- Mouth
  - location: Saar
  - coordinates: 49°20′26″N 6°42′50″E
- Length: 91 km (57 mi)

Basin features
- Progression: Saar→ Moselle→ Rhine→ North Sea

The Prims is a 91 km long river in western Germany, right tributary of the Saar. It rises in the Hunsrück mountains, near the village Malborn. It flows generally south through the towns Nonnweiler, Wadern and Schmelz. It flows into the Saar in Dillingen.

== See also ==
- List of rivers of Saarland
- List of rivers of Rhineland-Palatinate
