= Saar (river) =

River in France and Germany

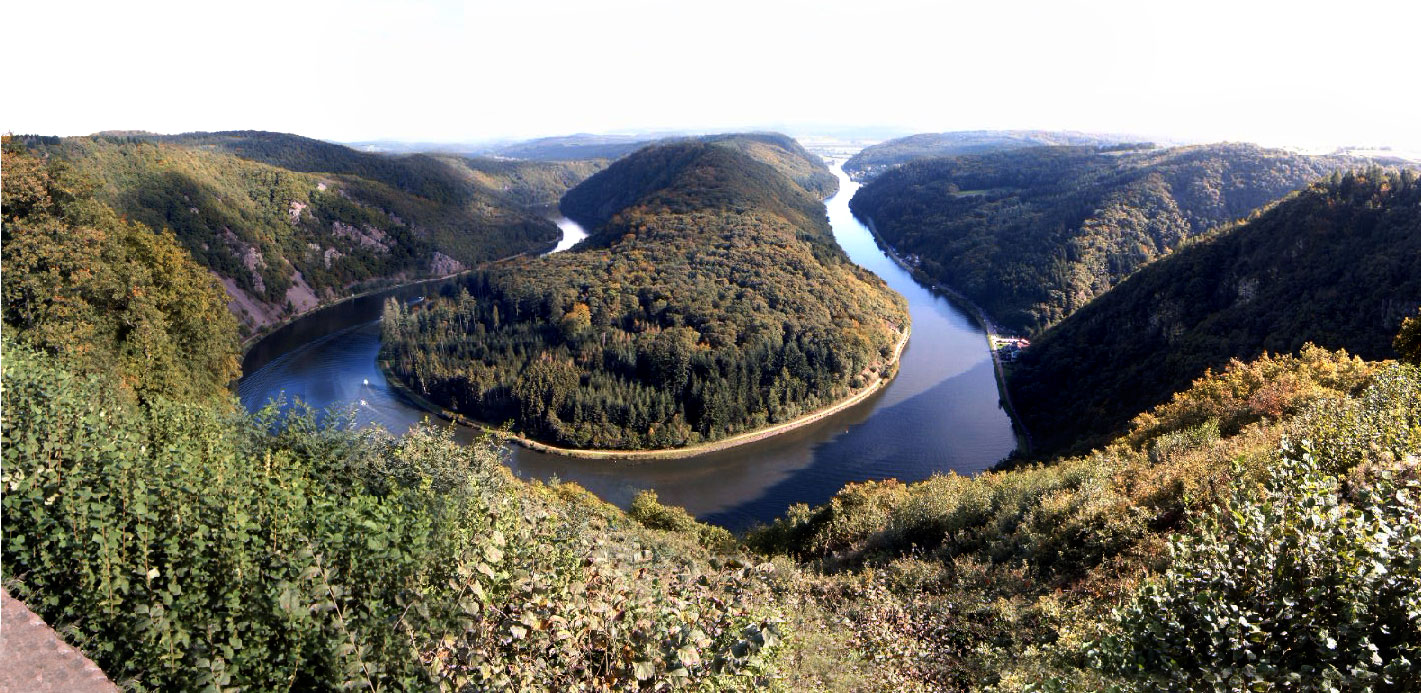
- Saar loop at Mettlach

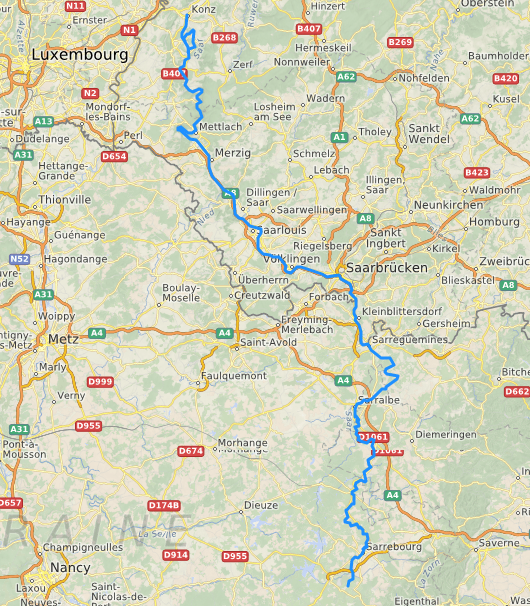

Location
- Countries: France and Germany

Physical characteristics
- Source: Sarre Blanche
  - location: Vosges mountains, Bas-Rhin
  - coordinates: 48°31′37″N 7°09′45″E
  - elevation: ±800 m (2,600 ft)
- 2nd source: Sarre Rouge
  - location: Vosges mountains, Moselle
  - coordinates: 48°32′05″N 7°10′05″E
  - elevation: ±670 m (2,200 ft)
- Mouth
  - location: Moselle
  - coordinates: 49°42′5″N 6°34′11″E
- Length: 246 km (153 mi)
- Basin size: 7,431 km^{2} (2,869 mi^{2})
- Discharge
  - average: 75 m^{3}/s (2,600 cu ft/s)

Basin features
- Progression: Moselle→ Rhine→ North Sea

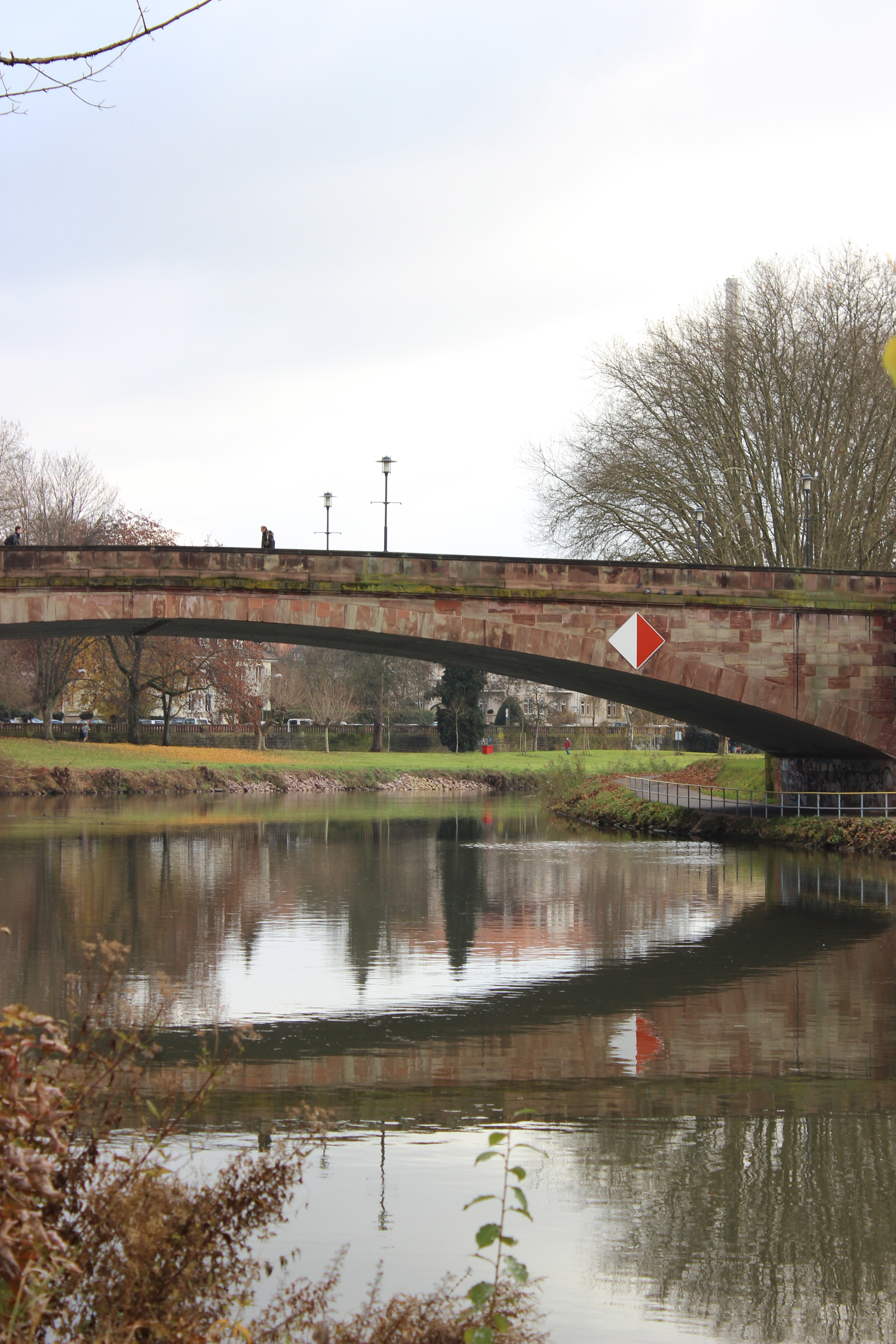
Bridge over the Saar in Saarbrücken

The Saar (German: [zaːɐ̯]; French: Sarre [saʁ]) is a river in northeastern France and western Germany, and a right tributary of the Moselle. It rises in the Vosges mountains on the border of Alsace and Lorraine and flows northwards into the Moselle near Trier. It has two headstreams (the Sarre Rouge and Sarre Blanche, which join in Lorquin), that both start near Mont Donon, the highest peak of the northern Vosges. After 246 kilometres (153 mi)—129 kilometres (80 mi) in France and on the French–German border, then 117 kilometres (73 mi) in Germany—the Saar flows into the Moselle at Konz, a town in Rhineland-Palatinate located between Trier and the border with Luxembourg. It has a catchment area of 7,431 square kilometres (2,869 mi^{2}).

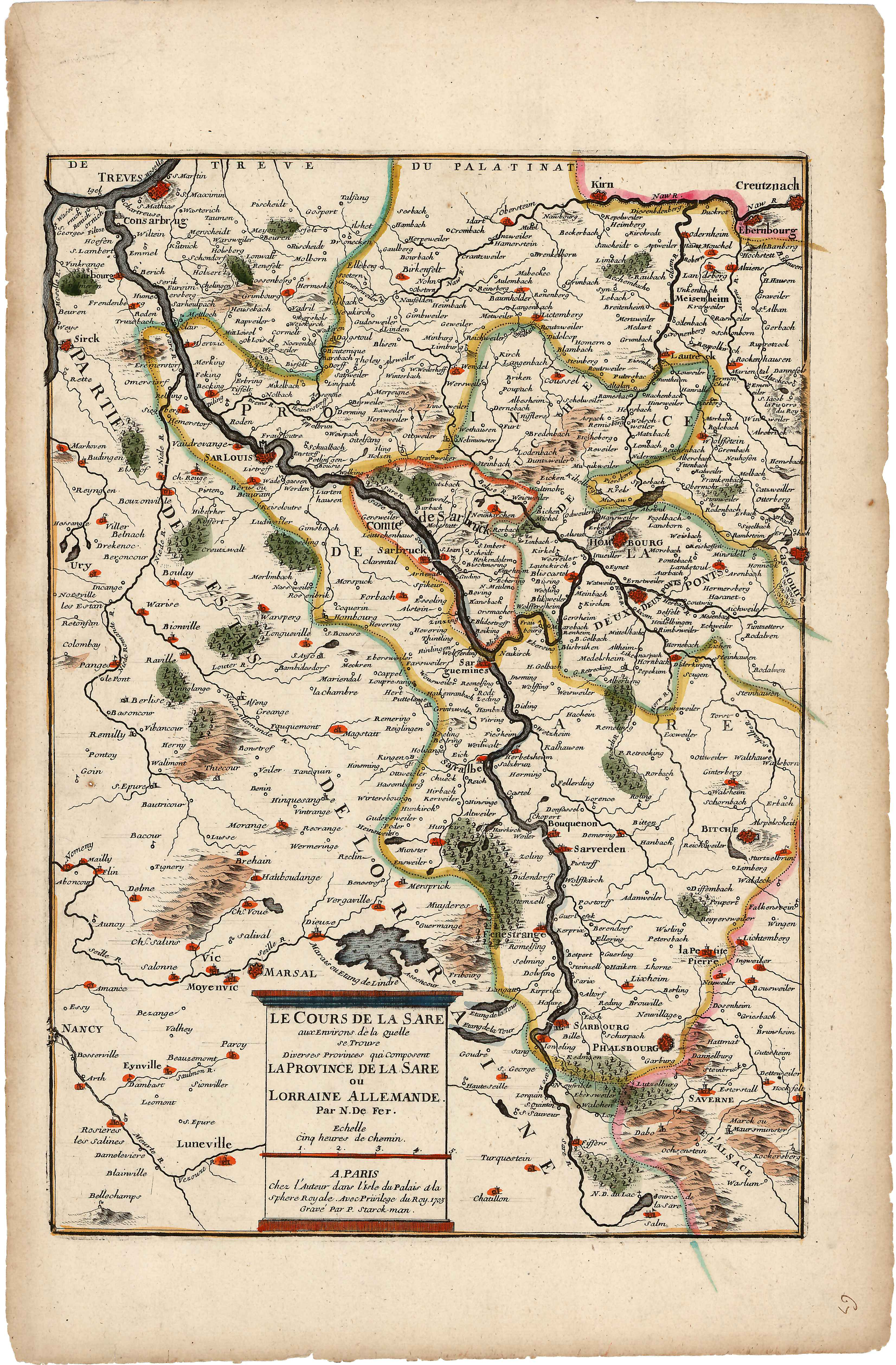
Course of the Saar (1703)

The Saar flows through the following departments of France, states of Germany and towns:

- Moselle, France: Abreschviller (Sarre Rouge), Lorquin, Sarrebourg, Fénétrange
- Bas-Rhin, France: Sarre-Union
- Moselle, France: Sarralbe, Sarreguemines
- Saarland, Germany: Saarbrücken, Völklingen, Wadgassen, Bous, Saarlouis, Dillingen, Merzig
- Rhineland-Palatinate, Germany: Saarburg, Konz.

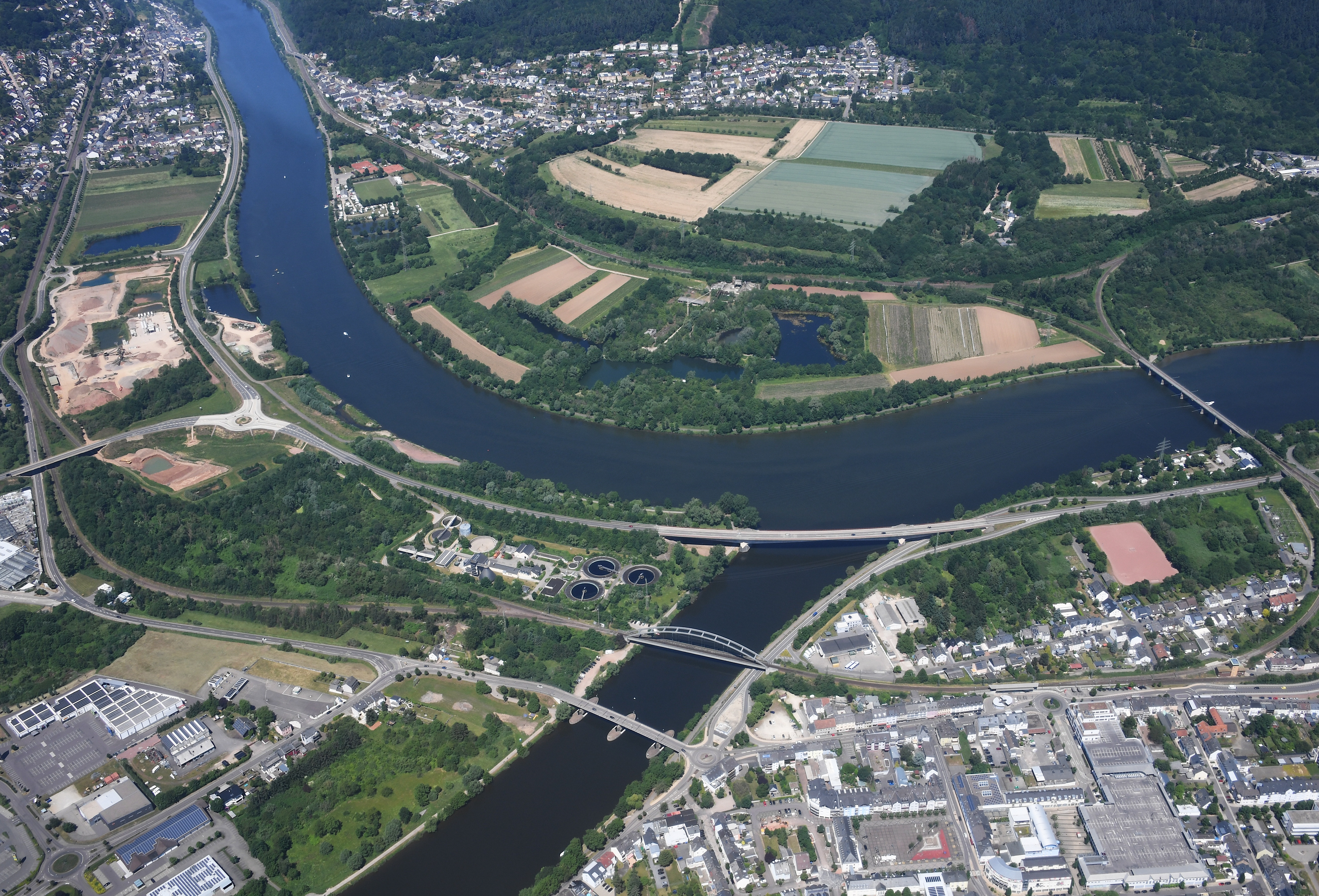
Confluence of Saar and Moselle in Konz

On the banks of the Saar is the Völklingen Ironworks, a UNESCO-designated World Heritage Site. At Mettlach, the Saar passes the well-known Saar loop. The lower Saar in Rhineland-Palatinate is a winegrowing region of some importance, producing mostly Riesling. Much more wine was grown on the banks of the Saar before the early 20th century, with the winegrowing region reaching further up from the river to Saarbrücken. In the early 21st century, some farmers from the Saarland area have started experimenting with winegrowing again.

== Etymology ==
The name 'Saar' and related names in other languages come from Saravus, the Latin name by which the Romans called the river. This itself derives from a Celtic word that ultimately comes from the Indo-European stem *ser-, meaning 'to flow'.

== Tributaries ==
Tributaries of the Saar are, from source to mouth:

- Sarre Blanche (left)
- Sarre Rouge (right)
- Bièvre (right)
- Isch (right)
- Albe (left)
- Eichel (right)
- Blies (right)
- Rohrbach (right)
- Köllerbach (right)
- Rossel (left)
- Bist (left)
- Ellbach (right)
- Prims (right)
- Nied (left)
- Leukbach (left)

== Navigation ==
In 2001, the lowermost 87.2 km (54.2 mi) section from the confluence of Saar and Moselle at Konz up to the city of Saarbrücken was upgraded for navigation with Class Vb ships. Since then, goods can be transported in the northbound direction, for instance, to the sea port of Rotterdam. In its middle section, the Saar had been made navigable in 1866 and was used for the transport of coal (upstream) and of iron ore (downstream) in southbound direction. The 17.5 km (10.9 mi) section between Saarbrücken and Sarreguemines is navigable for smaller Class I ships. At Sarreguemines the 64 km (40 mi) Canal de la Sarre (also navigable for Class I ships) connects the Saar since 1866 with the Marne–Rhine Canal at Gondrexange.

== See also ==
- List of rivers of France
- List of rivers of Rhineland-Palatinate
