= Arnold I of Vaucourt =

- Archbishop of Trier
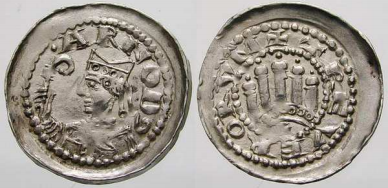
- Silver denier of Arnold I of Vaucourt, Archbishop of Trier. Obverse shows the mitered archbishop with a crosier and the name ARNOD.; the reverse shows an arched structure with five towers and a cross, with the motto TREVERORUM.
- Church: Catholic Church
- Diocese: Electorate of Trier
- In office: 1169–1183

Personal details
- Born: c. 1120
- Died: 25 May 1183

Arnold I of Vaucourt (French: Arnaud, Arnaut de Vaucort, German: Arnold von Valcourt, Valancourt, Walecourt) (circa 1120 – May 25, 1183 in Trier), was the Archbishop of Trier from 1169 to 1183. He took a pro-Imperial position in the Investiture Controversy of the twelfth century. As archbishop, Arnold was accounted a capable ruler, by turns thrifty and generous, with a genuine concern for his church and his domain.

Born into the Rhenish nobility of the upper Lorraine (probably in Vaucourt, near Lunéville in the modern French département of Meurthe-et-Moselle), Arnold was most likely the child of the Lord (Seigneur, Ritter) Wirich of Vaucourt (the founder of a (no longer extant) Cistercian abbey at Freistroff and builder of the Château Saint-Sixte), and thus related to several celebrated personalities of the time (e.g. Hildegard of Bingen, with whom Arnold corresponded). He was a capitular (member of the chapter) of the cathedral of Trier and Provost of St. Andrew's Church in Köln, later becoming a canon of the Aachen Cathedral as well. In 1169 he was elected as Archbishop of Trier at the wish of the Emperor Frederick I Barbarossa, to whom Arnold proved a clever counselor and a loyal and doughty partisan throughout his life, accompanying his master on several campaigns into Italy. While on one of these Italian sojourns, Arnold took part in the Third Lateran Council in 1179.

He took a particular interest in building up the ecclesiastical structures of his bishopric. On June 1, 1178 he presided over the consecration of the Romanesque Abbey of Himmerod. In 1181 he documented that the Seligenstatt Monastery in Seck had been donated to the Archmonastery of Trier.

In 1180, Arnold granted permission to the Vogt of Merzig (as it happened, his cousin, Arnulf de Walecourt), to reconstruct the fortress on the Sciva ("Ship") fell on the Saar River near Mettlach, calling the new castle Montclair. (This stronghold had lain waste since the feud of his predecessor Poppo of Babenberg with the anti-archbishop Adalbero of Luxembourg.) This unfortunately gave the first impulse to a struggle between Arnold's German kin, who claimed the castle as a family fief, and the Archbishops of Trier, who claimed it as a dependency of the archbishopric; their strife lasted some two centuries, culminating in the devastation of Montclair under Archbishop Baldwin of Luxembourg.

Upon Arnold's death in Trier in May 1183, the succession to the Archbishopric fell into dispute between Folmar of Karden and Rudolf of Wied.

Catholic Church titles
| Preceded by Hillin of Falmagne | Archbishop of Trier; 1169-1183 | Succeeded by Folmar of Karden |
