= List of castles and palaces in Saarland =

Numerous castles are found in the German state of Saarland. These buildings, some of which have a history of over 1000 years, were the setting of historical events, domains of famous personalities and are still imposing buildings to this day.

This list encompasses castles described in German as Burg (castle), Festung (fort/fortress), Schloss (manor house) and Palais/Palast (palace). Many German castles after the Middle Ages were mainly built as royal or ducal palaces rather than as a fortified building.

== Castles and palaces ==
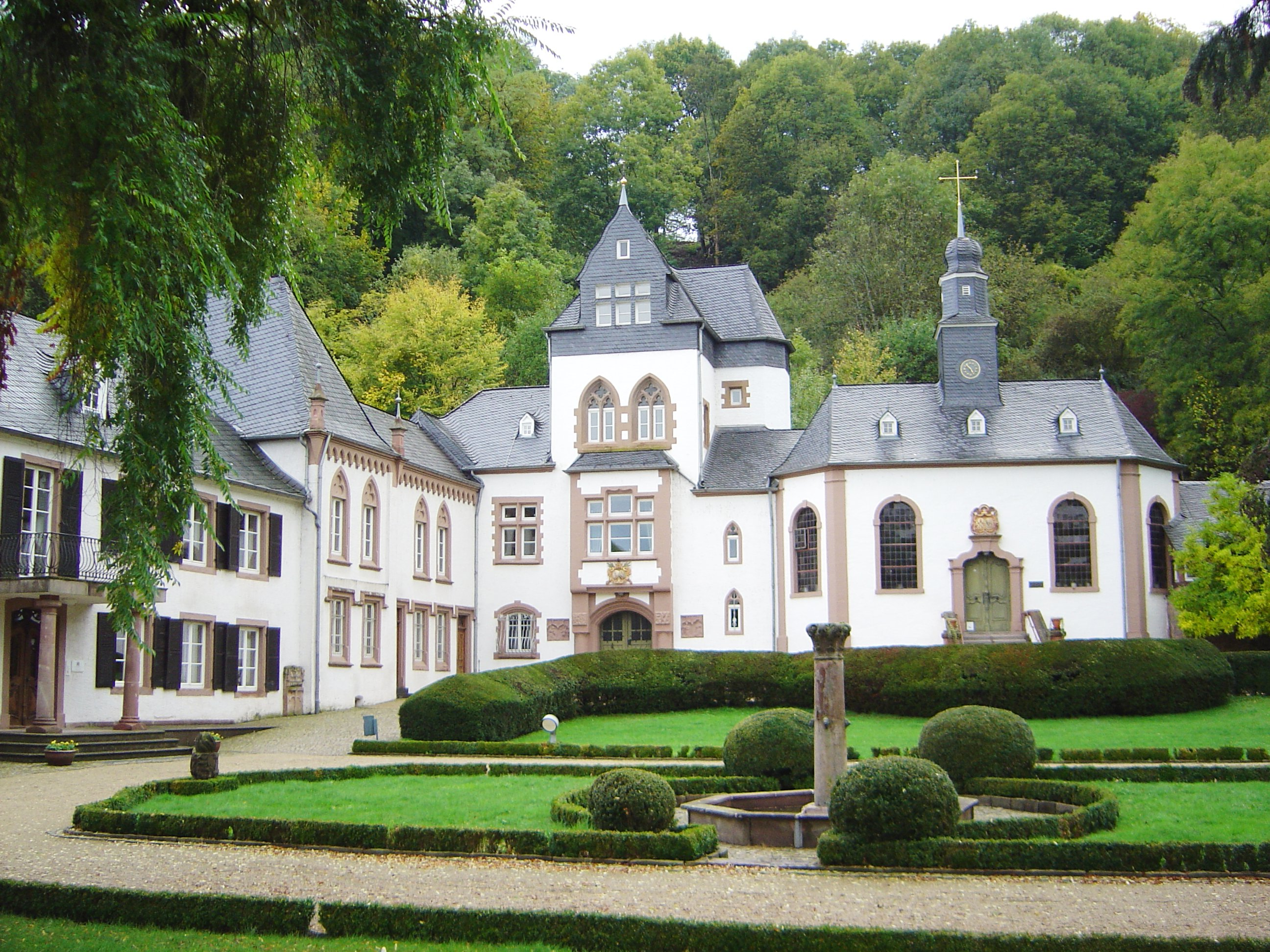
Schloss Dagstuhl

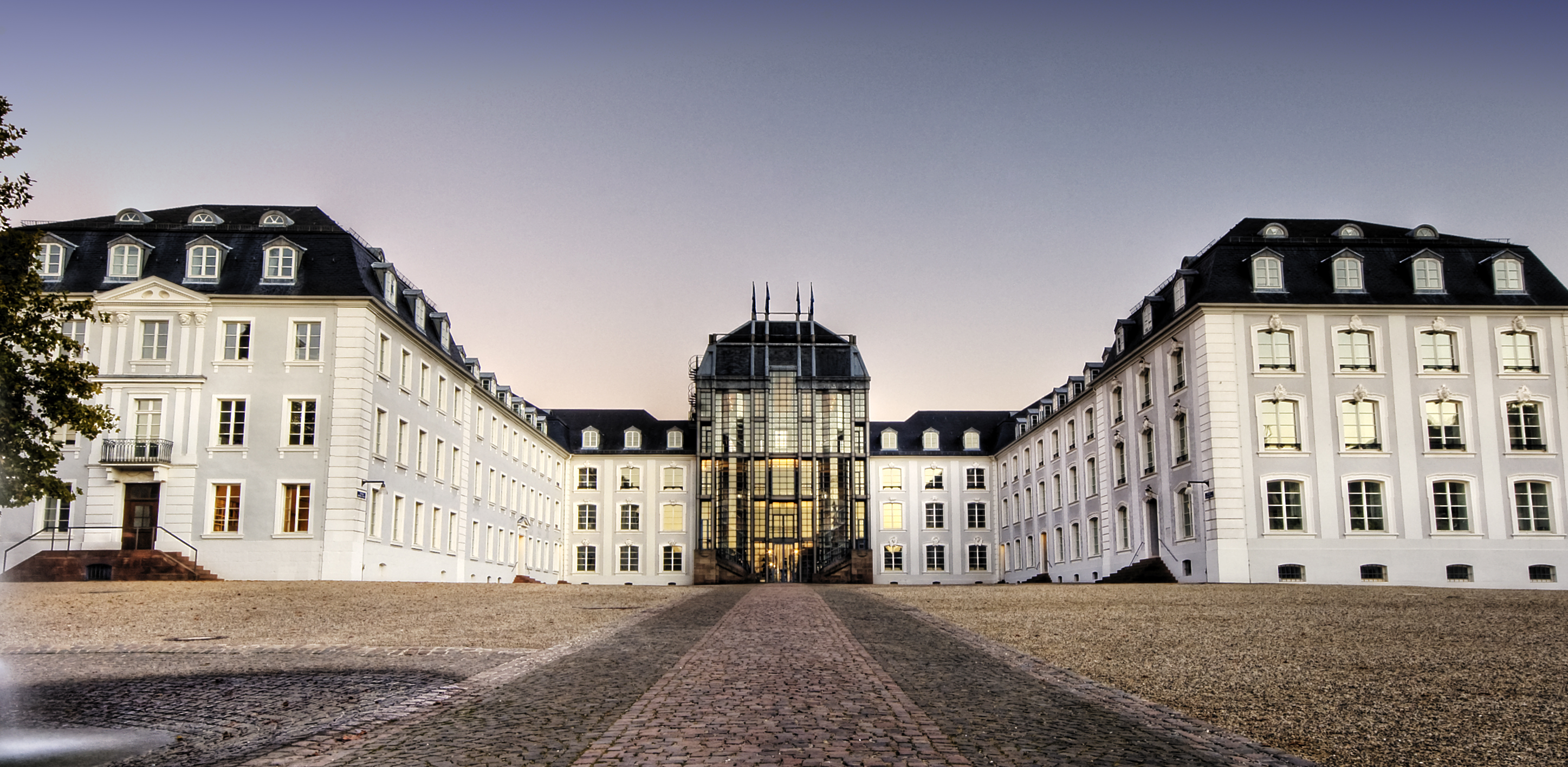
Saarbrücken Castle

- Burg Bucherbach, Püttlingen
- Schloss Dagstuhl, Dagstuhl
- Dagstuhl Castle, Dagstuhl
- Burg Esch, Oberesch
- Festung Hohenburg, Homburg
- Gustavsburg (Jägersburg), Jägersburg
- Schloss Karlsberg, Homburg
- Jagdschloss Karlsbrunn, Karlsbrunn
- Burg Kerpen, Illingen
- Burg Kirkel, Kirkel
- Schloss LaMotte, Lebach
- Liebenburg, Namborn
- Burg Mengen (Bliesmengen-Bolchen)
- Merburg, Kirrberg
- Burg Montclair, Mettlach
- Burg Püttlingen
- Schloss Saarbrücken, Saarbrücken
- Altes Schloss (Scheiden)
- Siersburg, Rehlingen-Siersburg
- Stiefler Schloss, St. Ingbert
- Teufelsburg, Überherrn
- Burg Veldenz, Nohfelden
- Werexcastel, Niederwürzbach

== See also ==
- List of castles
- List of castles in Germany
