= Habkirchen =

- Ortsteil of Mandelbachtal
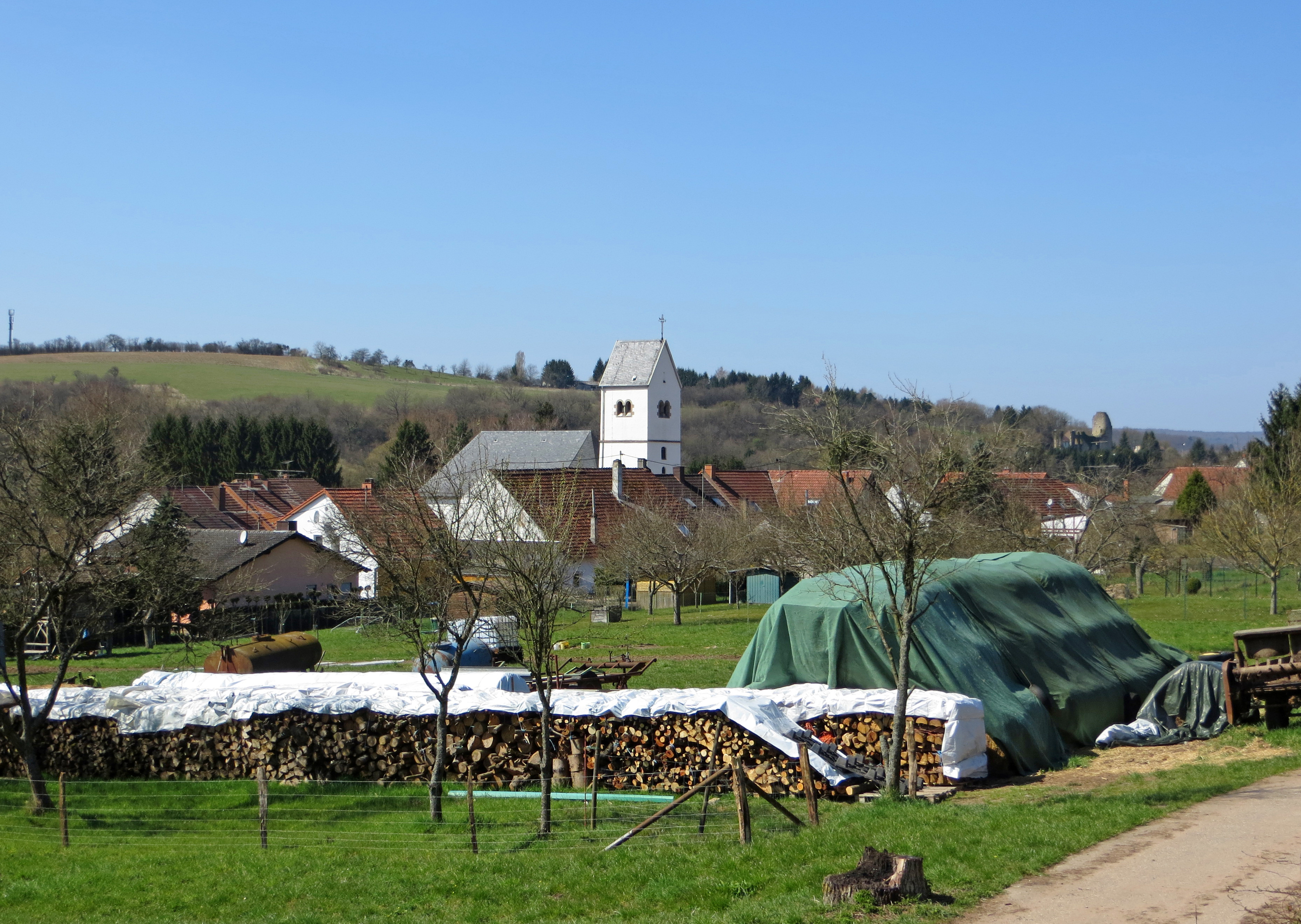
- View of Habkirchen from the southeast

- Coat of arms
- Interactive map of Habkirchen
- Location within Germany Location within Saarland
- Coordinates: 49°13′N 7°13′E
- Country: Germany
- State: Saarland
- District: Saarpfalz
- Municipality: Mandelbachtal
- Elevation: 212 m (696 ft)
- Time zone: UTC+01:00 (CET)
  - Summer (DST): UTC+02:00 (CEST)
- Postal codes: 66399
- Dialling codes: 06804

Habkirchen is the smallest village (Ortsteil) in the municipality of Mandelbachtal in Saarland, Federal Republic of Germany.

== Geography ==
=== Location ===
Habkirchen is located in the southern Blies valley, in the Saarpfalz-Kreis. where the Mandelbach flows into the Blies. The district is strongly hilly and agricultural in character.

=== Climate ===
The climate is influenced by the Atlantic. The average annual precipitation is 786 millimetres (30.9 in), the rainiest time is in the spring months. The average annual temperature is 9 °C (48 °F). The long-term mean temperature medium does not drop below 0 °C (32 °F), even in January. The prevailing wind direction is west/southwest. The bioclimate is mild to gentle.

Habkirchen is primarily a residential and commuter community. Most professionals work as commuters in the Saarbrücken area.

== History ==
Already in the early Middle Ages, in 819 AD, Habkirchen is mentioned as a local center, with a church, royal estate, and residence of a count. Mandelbach, at the confluence of the Mandelbach in the Blies, first mentioned in 1239, belonged ecclesiastically to the parish of Habkirchen. The district was incorporated in 1791 as "Habkirchen". In 1525 Habkirchen was also the scene of disputes during the peasant uprising, in which the "Billen Nikel" was particularly prominent. After the Thirty Years' War in 1651 only two inhabitants remained in Habkirchen, and only three in Mandelbach. In 1688 Habkirchen, Mandelbach, Blies-Ébersing with the Wiesingerhof, Folpersviller, and Frauenberg were included in the parish of Habkirchen.

Until the French Revolution Habkirchen belonged to the Blieskastel administrative district of the Electorate of Trier. In the 19th century Habkirchen experienced a great boom. Industrialization changed the living conditions, and the majority of the inhabitants now worked in the porcelain factory of Saargemünd and the Halberg foundry in Brebach. The Franco-Prussian War had no drastic effects, but in the First World War 29 local people were killed. As in other towns of the district the Second World War also brought heavy losses. Twice the population had to evacuate during the clearance of the "red zone", a 10 kilometres (6.2 mi)-wide area surrounding the Siegfried Line. In September 1939, during the French Saar Offensive, the ancient Saint Anne's Chapel (Annakapelle) was destroyed and not rebuilt until 1947. In the winter of 1944–45, the area was the scene of heavy fighting, changing hands twice between the Americans and the Germans. In the end, no building remained without damage.

On January 1, 1974, Habkirchen was incorporated into the newly formed community of Mandelbachtal.
