= Château Saint-Sixte =

Castle in Freistroff, France

Coordinates: 49°16′28″N 6°29′20″E

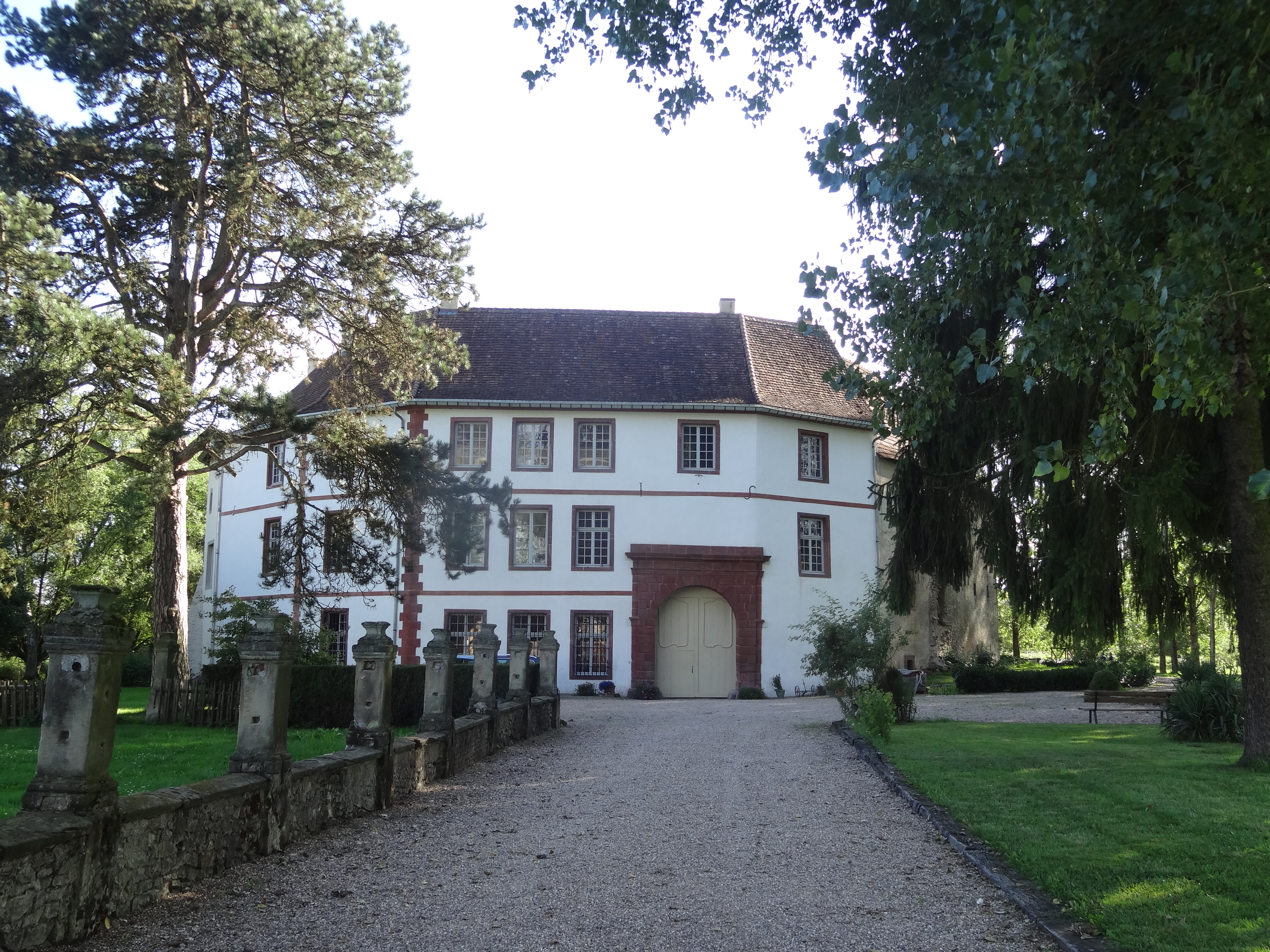
Main entrance to Saint-Sixte castle

The Château Saint-Sixte is a 12th-century castle in the commune of Freistroff in the Moselle département of France.

The Château Saint-Sixte stands on a small plain between Freistroff and Rémelfang. It was built in the 12th century by the seigneur Wirich de Valcourt. During the Renaissance, it was transformed into a residence and was altered again in the 18th century. It was saved from ruin by the Gehl family in 1986. Separated from the village on the left bank of the Nied, it has a strange oval plan, surrounding by ancient moats. The six originally separate buildings are roofed with two slopes of tiles and arranged around an entirely enclosed courtyard. In each corner, a polygonal staircase tower gives access to the upper storeys.

The château is open to visitors every afternoon from April to October, with guided tours at weekends. Organised groups may visit throughout the year.

The castle is privately owned. In 1986, the Gehl family bought the castle and the estate around it. Their sons Dominique, Philippe and Luc undertook the thorough restoration of the castle. In 2007, Philippe Gehl bought the castle from his two brothers, and continues the work with the assistance of a restoration association. It has been listed since 1991 as a monument historique by the French Ministry of Culture.

== See also ==
- List of castles in France
