= Burg Mengen (Bliesmengen-Bolchen) =

Ruin of a medieval castle near Mandelbachtal

- Mandelbachtal - Bliesmengen-Bolchen in Germany
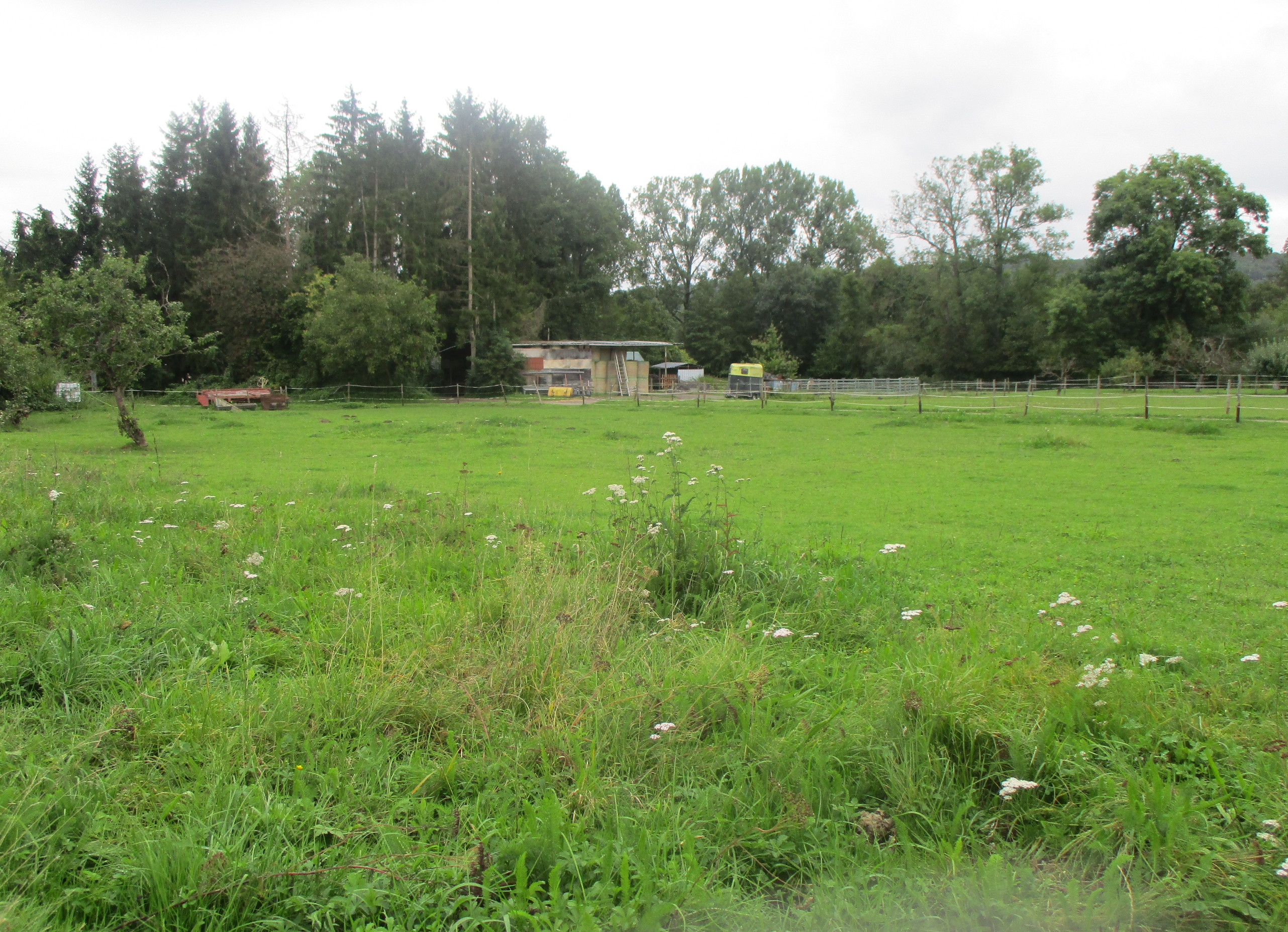

Site information
- Condition: Ruins, partial walls remain

Location
- Coordinates: 49.14801°N 7.110373°E

Site history
- Built: 12th Century

Burg Mengen, or Mengen Castle in English, is a medieval lowland water castle located in Bliesmengen-Bolchen, Mandelbachtal, Saarland, Germany. It was founded by the Lords of Mengen, a cadet branch of the Lords of Warnesberg-Raville, in the 12th century. Only minor ruins remain today.

== History ==
=== Founding and early history ===
Burg Mengen was founded in the 12th century by the Lords of Mengen, a ministerial noble family serving the Dukes of Lorraine. The castle was constructed as a lowland water castle, surrounded by moats, and functioned both as a fortified residence and as a center of local administration. The earliest documented members of the family, Heinrich and Johannes von Mengen, appear in records from the late 13th century, suggesting that the family had already been established in the region for at least one generation. The moated castle, founded by the Lords of Mengen in the 12th century, was first mentioned in 1289, destroyed by the Lords of Bitsch in 1362, rebuilt a few years later and was owned by the Von der Leyen family in the 17th century.

=== The Lords of Mengen ===
Lords of Mengen coat of arms

The Lords of Mengen were a cadet branch of the Lords of Warnesberg-Raville, as indicated by their coat of arms. As such, they were part of a larger noble lineage in the Lorraine region and held estates in the Blies valley. The family included notable members such as Ritter Bolch von Mengen, whose name appears in local legends and cultural memory. The Lords of Mengen exercised administrative, judicial, and military functions typical of ministerial families of the period.

=== Conflicts and destruction ===
In 1362, Burg Mengen was destroyed by the Lords of Bitsch during regional feuds. The castle was subsequently rebuilt, though detailed records of the reconstruction are sparse. These conflicts reflect the turbulent nature of Saarland and Lorraine border territories during the Late Middle Ages.

=== Later ownership ===
By the 15th century, the Mengen family’s influence declined, and the castle eventually came under the control of more powerful neighbours, including the Von der Leyen family and Lorraine authorities. During this period, Burg Mengen lost much of its administrative and military importance.

== Modern history ==
In the 20th century, the castle’s moats were filled in, and only minor wall fragments remain today. The site is currently privately owned. Despite its ruined state, Burg Mengen remains a part of local heritage, with cultural references in legends, village museum exhibits, and hiking trails such as the Ritter-Bolch-Rundweg.
