= Funghellino =

Stand used in the Roman Catholic liturgy

The funghellino (lit. 'small mushroom') is a short mushroom-shaped stand used in the Roman Catholic liturgy. It is placed on the altar at a Pontifical Mass to hold the bishop's and higher prelates' skullcap (zucchetto) during the Eucharistic prayer.
