= Zucchetto =

Type of skullcap worn by clergy

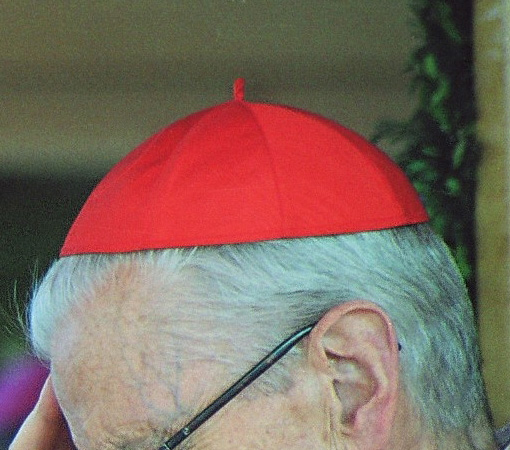
Cardinal Franciszek Macharski with a scarlet zucchetto

The zucchetto (Note: /(t)suːˈkɛtoʊ, zuːˈ-/, also UK: /tsʊˈ-/, US: /zʊˈ-/, Italian: [dzukˈketto]; meaning 'small gourd', from zucca 'pumpkin' or more generally 'gourd'; pl. zucchetti. Compare zucchini, of related origin.) or solideo, officially a pileolus, is a small, hemispherical, form-fitting ecclesiastical skullcap worn by clerics of the Catholic Church, the Syriac Orthodox Church, and by senior clergy in certain denominations of Lutheranism, Anglicanism, and Methodism.

It is also called a pilus, pilos, pileus, pileolo, subbiretum, submitrale, soli deo, berrettino, calotte or calotta.

== History ==
The zucchetto originated as the Paleo-Balkanic pileus and is related to the beret (which itself was originally a large zucchetto). The official name of the zucchetto—pileolus—means "small pileus" in Latin. Clerics adopted the style around the Early Middle Ages or earlier, to keep their heads warm and to insulate the tonsure. The name zucchetto derives from its resemblance to half a pumpkin. (Note: Compare: "zucchetto". Oxford English Dictionary (online ed.). Oxford University Press. (Subscription or participating institution membership required.) – from Italian zucchetta or zucchetto ("a small gourd" or "cap"); itself from zucca ("gourd" or "the head").) It is similar to the Jewish kippah or yarmulke, but typically differs in construction, with the zucchetto made of separate joined sections and color-coordinated to clerical status. It is normally used only by clergy and not by ordinary people, which also differs from the kippah. The resemblance between the two types of headgear is often seen as being deliberate but the zucchetto is distinct from and predates the skullcap style of kippah and yarmulke by hundreds of years.

== Construction and design ==
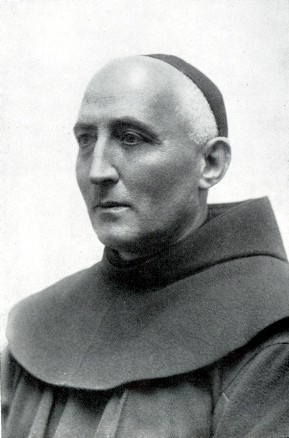
Dionysius Ortsiefer, a German Franciscan friar, wearing a zucchetto

In Catholicism, the modern zucchetto is most commonly made of silk. The design utilises eight gores or triangular panels that are joined at the tips to form a hemispherical skullcap. Jutting from the central tip of the zucchetto is the "stem", known as stirpis or stirpes. It is made of a twisted loop of silk cord and is meant to make handling the zucchetto easier. The stirpes is the primary visual distinction between the zucchetto and the Jewish kippah.

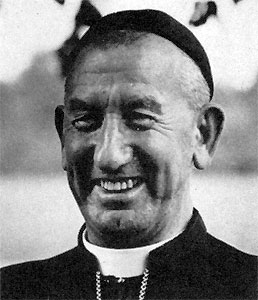
Gunnar Rosendal, a Lutheran priest of the Church of Sweden, wearing a zucchetto

The zucchetto traditionally has a lining of thin white chamois as an insulator; this is also to help keep the shape of the zucchetto. Inside the trim, there is a strip of velvet to ensure a secure and comfortable fit. Most modern zucchetto designs include a cloth lining, and the contemporary trend is using ordinary synthetic cloth with a simple, natural cloth lining.

=== Colors ===
The color of the zucchetto in Catholicism generally denotes the office held by the wearer:

- The pope's zucchetto is white, and Benedict XVI continued to wear a white zucchetto as pope emeritus.
- Those worn by cardinals are scarlet.
- Those of archbishops, bishops, territorial abbots and territorial prelates are amaranth.
- Non-territorial abbots, priests and deacons may wear a black zucchetto, although most do not.

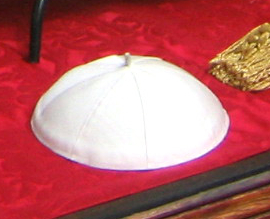
White zucchetto worn by popes and popes emeriti

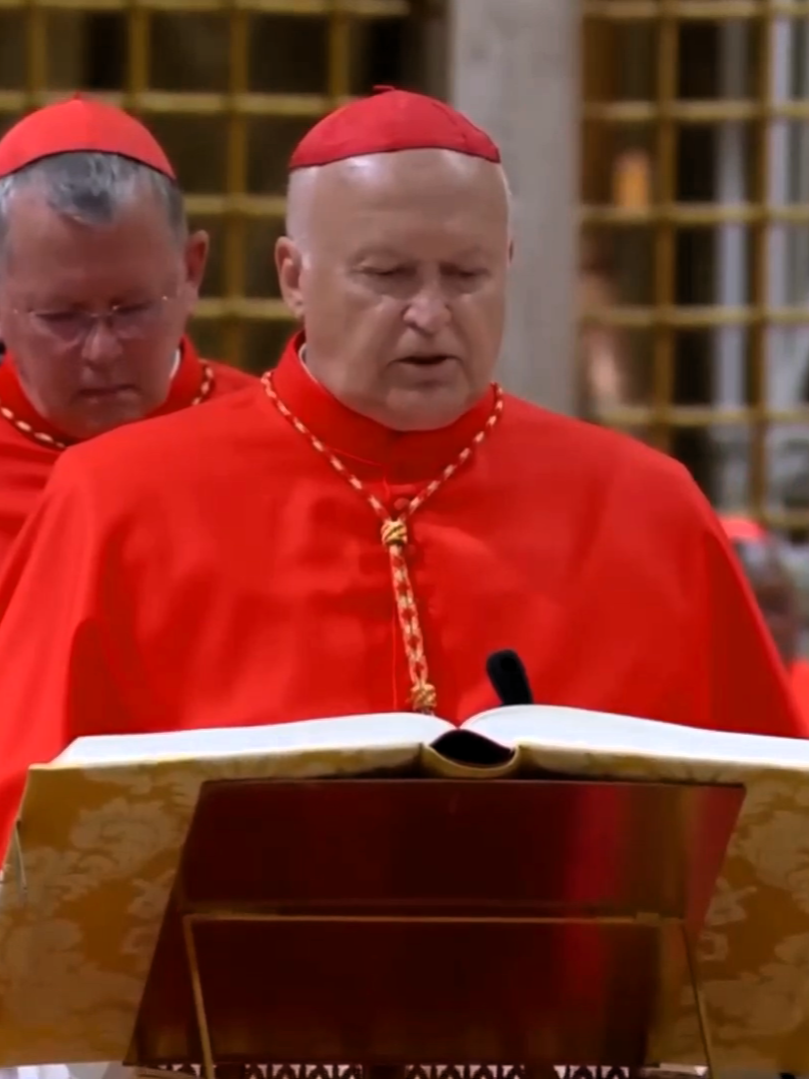
Scarlet zucchetti worn by two cardinals

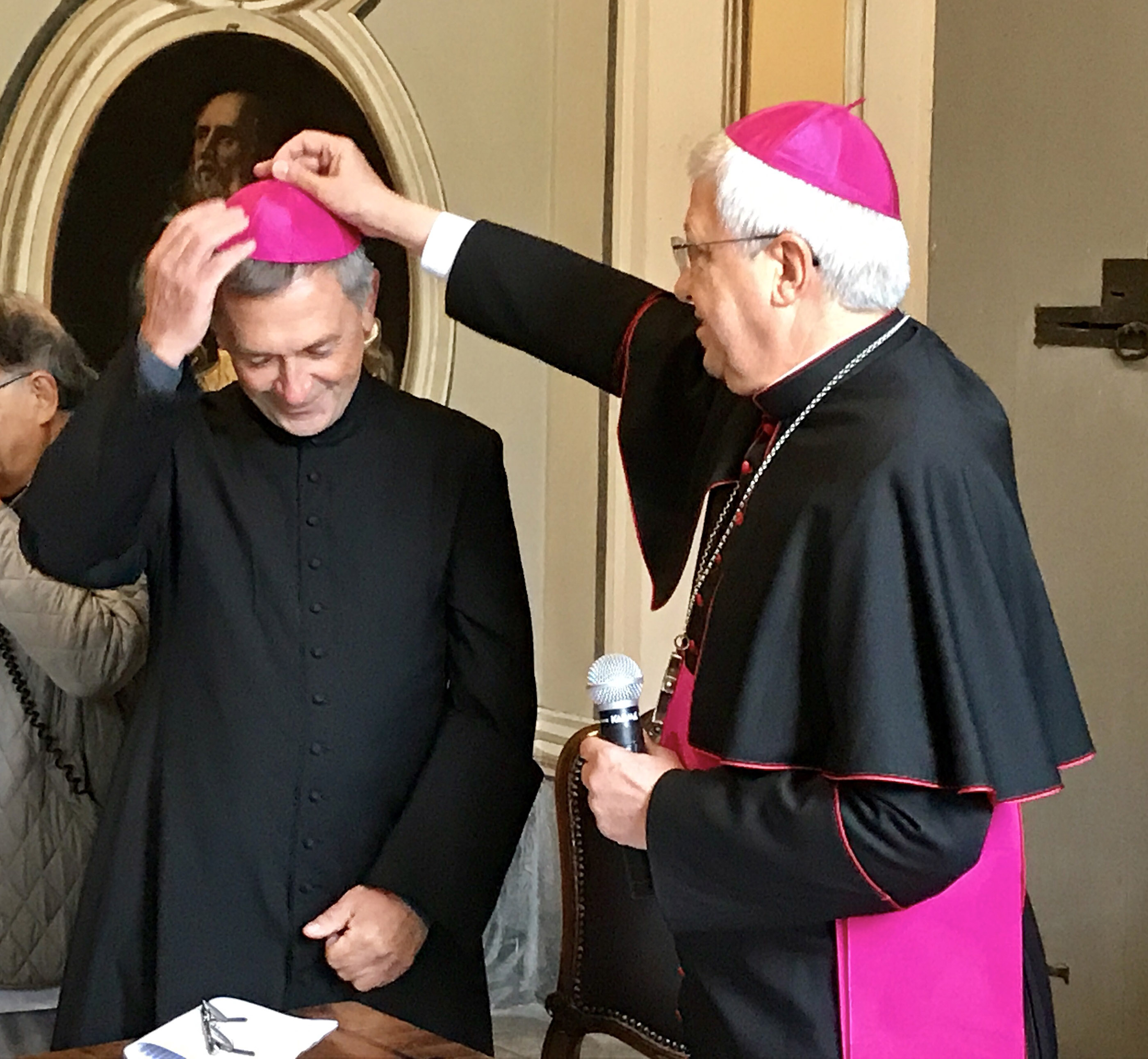
Two bishops wearing amaranth zucchetti

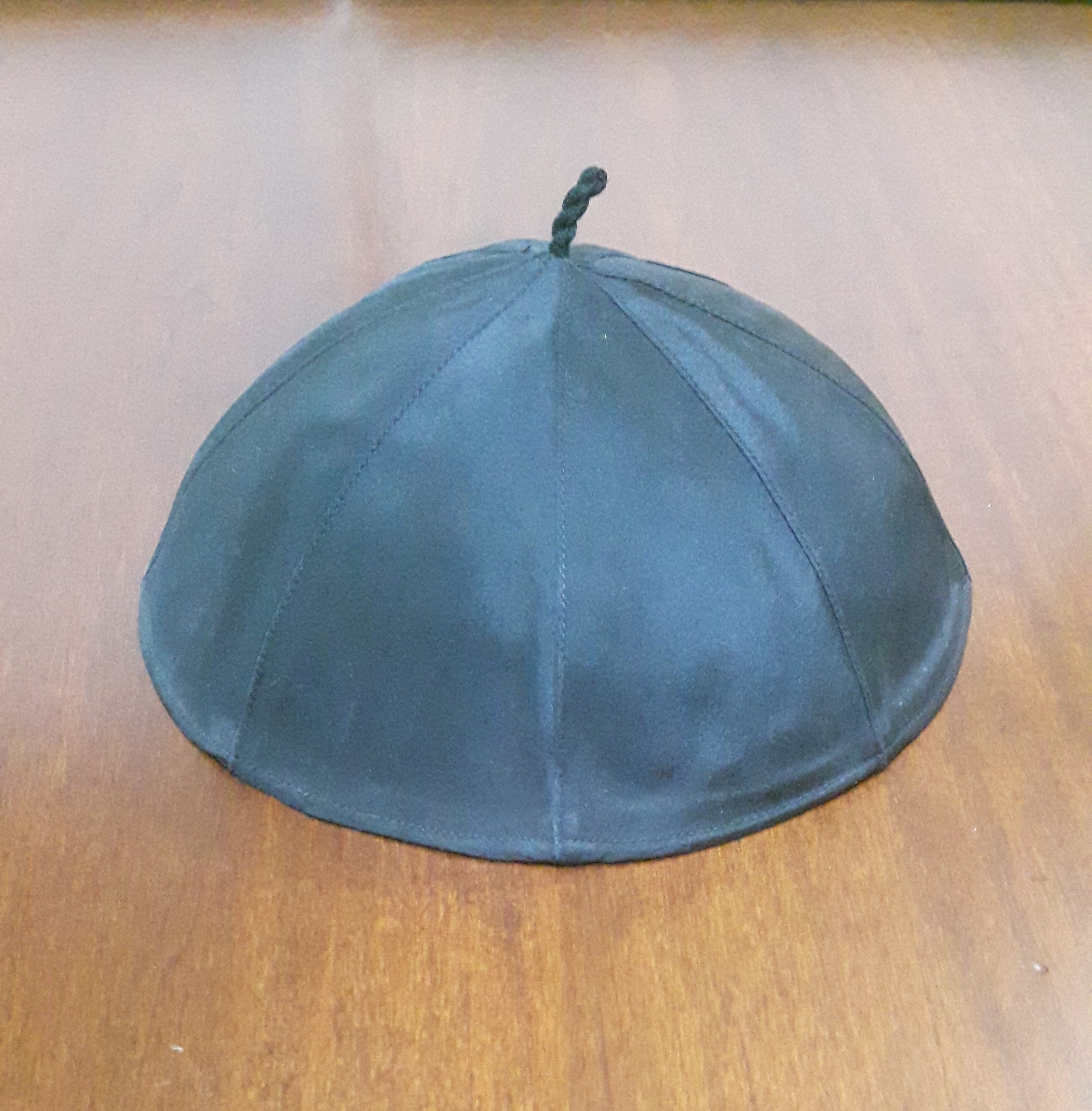
Priest's black zucchetto

In some cases, the color of the zucchetto may also reflect the religious order of the wearer:

- Members of religious orders with white habits (e.g. Norbertines) may wear a white zucchetto made of wool.
- Some Franciscans have adopted the practice of wearing a brown zucchetto to match their brown habit.

=== Denominational variation ===
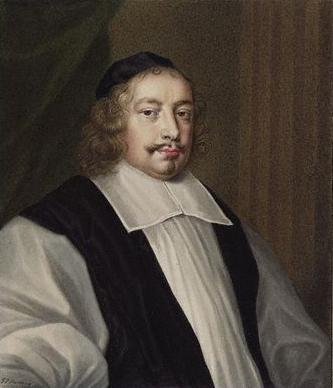
John Dolben, Anglican Archbishop of York, wearing a skullcap

The most common Evangelical-Lutheran and Anglican design can be similar to the Roman Catholic zucchetto. A form of the zucchetto is worn by Anglican bishops and is used approximately like that of the Catholic Church. The Anglican 'skullcap' differs from the zucchetto primarily in that it is made of six panels, bears a button at centre of the crown, and is of slightly larger dimensions. The other exception is that instead of the Catholic "church violet", Anglican churches usually (but not always) use purple caps on bishops.

In the Syriac Orthodox tradition, a seven-panel zucchetto called a phiro is worn by nearly all priests. It is always black and embroidered with black Orthodox crosses.

Clergy of the Serbian Orthodox Church in the Austrian Empire wore zucchetti (Serbian: ћелепуш) in order to look more similar to the Catholic clergy.

The zuchetto of an Evangelical-Lutheran priest of the Church of Sweden

The zuchetto of an Evangelical-Lutheran priest of the Church of Sweden (zoomed)

== Usage ==
All ordained men in the Latin Church of the Catholic Church are entitled to wear the black zucchetto unless promoted to a higher office, and it is worn with either the cassock or liturgical vestments, never a suit. For Bishops and Cardinals, when a biretta or mitre is worn, a zucchetto is always worn underneath, hence its other names of subbirettum and submitrale.

The common tradition is for the cleric to obtain the zucchetto either from an ecclesiastical tailor or a retail church supply. There is also a tradition of friends buying a newly appointed bishop his first zucchetto.

A lower-ranking prelate must always doff his skullcap to a higher-ranking prelate; all prelates must remove their zucchetti in the presence of the pope, unless the pope prefers otherwise.

The zucchetto is worn throughout most of the Mass, is removed at the commencement of the Preface, and replaced at the conclusion of Communion, when the Blessed Sacrament is put away. The zucchetto is also not worn at any occasion where the Blessed Sacrament is exposed. A short zucchetto stand known as a funghellino (lit. 'little mushroom', usually made of brass or wood) can be placed near the altar to provide a safe place for the zucchetto when it is not being worn.

=== Gifting ===
Popes and other prelates often give away their skullcaps to the faithful. The practice, which was started in the modern era by Pope Pius XII, involves giving the zucchetto to the faithful, as a keepsake, if presented with a new one as a gift. Popes John Paul II, Benedict XVI, Francis, and Leo XIV have continued the custom. The pope might choose not to give the visitor his own zucchetto, but rather place the gift zucchetto on his head for a moment as a blessing, then return it to the giver. The above popes mentioned, bishops, cardinals and archbishops such as Fulton J. Sheen frequently gave their old zucchetti in exchange for the newly offered one; Sheen also gave his zucchetto as a keepsake to laity who requested it.

== In popular culture ==
In an episode the TV show Pawn Stars (season 17), Father Richard Kunst, curator of the Papal Artifacts website, was consulted regarding a zucchetto said to have belonged to Pope Pius XII during World War II. The show’s producers contacted him because of his expertise in papal memorabilia. In that episode, Chumlee, one of the show's hosts, sought to determine whether the zucchetto was genuine, and consulted an assistant professor of theology in Rome who confirmed its authenticity.

In another episode of Pawn Stars (season 7), a pair of slippers and stockings alongside a zucchetto, all of which said to have belonged to Pope Leo XIII, were attempted to be sold to the store where most of these show episodes take place, but at the end they did not do business with the owner of the items.

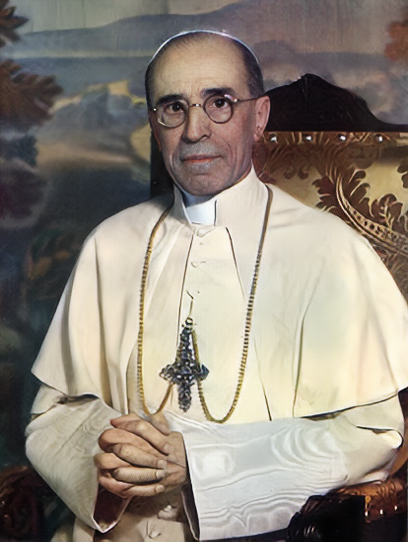
Pope Pius XII

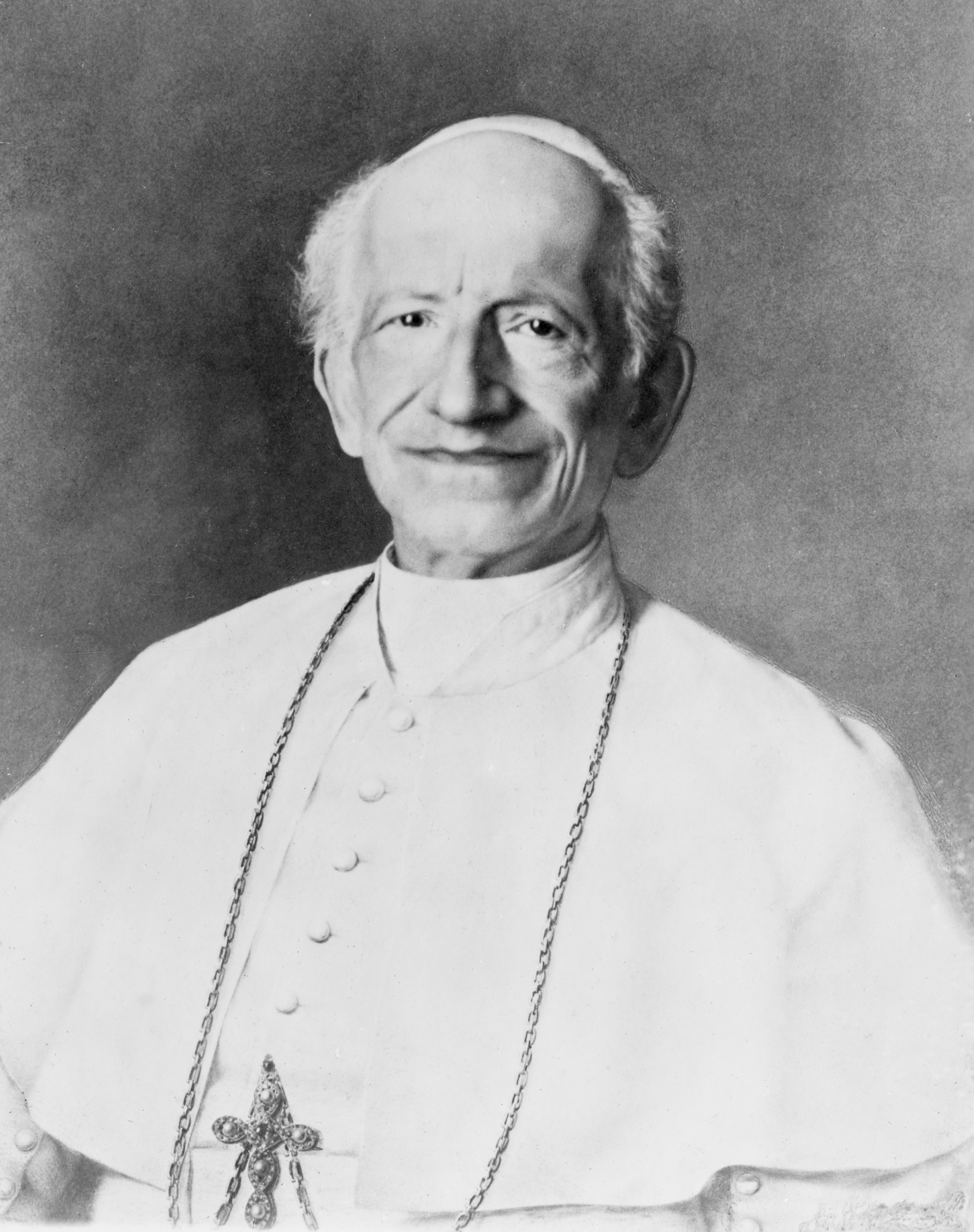
Pope Leo XIII

== See also ==
- List of hat styles
- Taqiyah (cap)
- Skufia
- Philippi Collection
- Kippah or yarmulke
