= Bliesmengen-Bolchen =

- Ortsteil of Mandelbachtal
- Coat of arms
- Interactive map of Bliesmengen-Bolchen
- Location within Germany Location within Saarland
- Coordinates: 49°9′12″N 7°6′50″E
- Country: Germany
- State: Saarland
- District: Saarpfalz-Kreis
- Municipality: Mandelbachtal
- Elevation: 208 m (682 ft)

Population (2016)
  - Total: 1,802
- Time zone: UTC+01:00 (CET)
  - Summer (DST): UTC+02:00 (CEST)
- Postal codes: 66399
- Dialling codes: 06804

Bliesmengen-Bolchen is a part of the Mandelbachtal municipality within Saarpfalz-Kreis, Saarland, Germany. Its name comes from the two villages that made up the town, Bliesmengen and Bliesbolchen, that united in 1900 and had historically been closely related. In 1974 it became part of the new municipality Mandelbachtal.
