= Burg Kirkel =

Hill castle ruin in Saarland, Germany

Kirkel Castle
- Kirkel-Neuhäusel in Germany
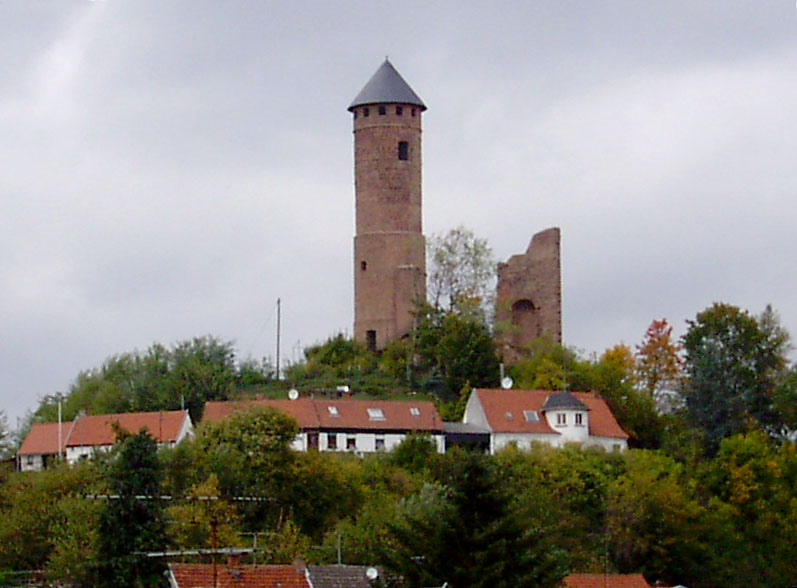

Site information
- Condition: Ruins

Location
- Coordinates: 49.283056°N 7.240278°E

Site history
- Built: 1075

Burg Kirkel (Kirkel Castle), also known as the Kirkeler Burg, is a hill castle ruin located on a sandstone spur above Kirkel-Neuhäusel in the Saarpfalz district of Saarland, Germany. It is a prominent regional landmark and a cultural-historical focal point for the municipality of Kirkel.

== Geography & Strategic Location ==
Burg Kirkel stands atop a detached Buntsandstein (colored sandstone) hill known as the Schlossberg, rising to approximately 307 m above sea level. Its elevated position allowed the castle's occupants to command a wide view over the surrounding landscape, making it naturally defensible on most sides.

The castle was strategically selected to monitor and control a medieval trade and travel route known as the Geleitstraße ("escort road"), which later became part of the Kaiserstraße. This position allowed Burg Kirkel to protect merchants traveling between Metz and the Upper Rhine, as well as the surrounding villages, and to enforce tolls or escort rights (*Geleitrecht*) along the route.

Archaeological evidence, including foundation walls, Zwinger structures, and a northern well tower (*Brunnenturm*), confirms the castle's defensive capabilities, ensuring water access and resilience during sieges. Its commanding height and fortifications made it a military stronghold, as evidenced by remains of a drawbridge, curtain walls and the proximity to the Via Regia, an administrative center, consolidating local political and economic influence over the region as they controlled part of the route.

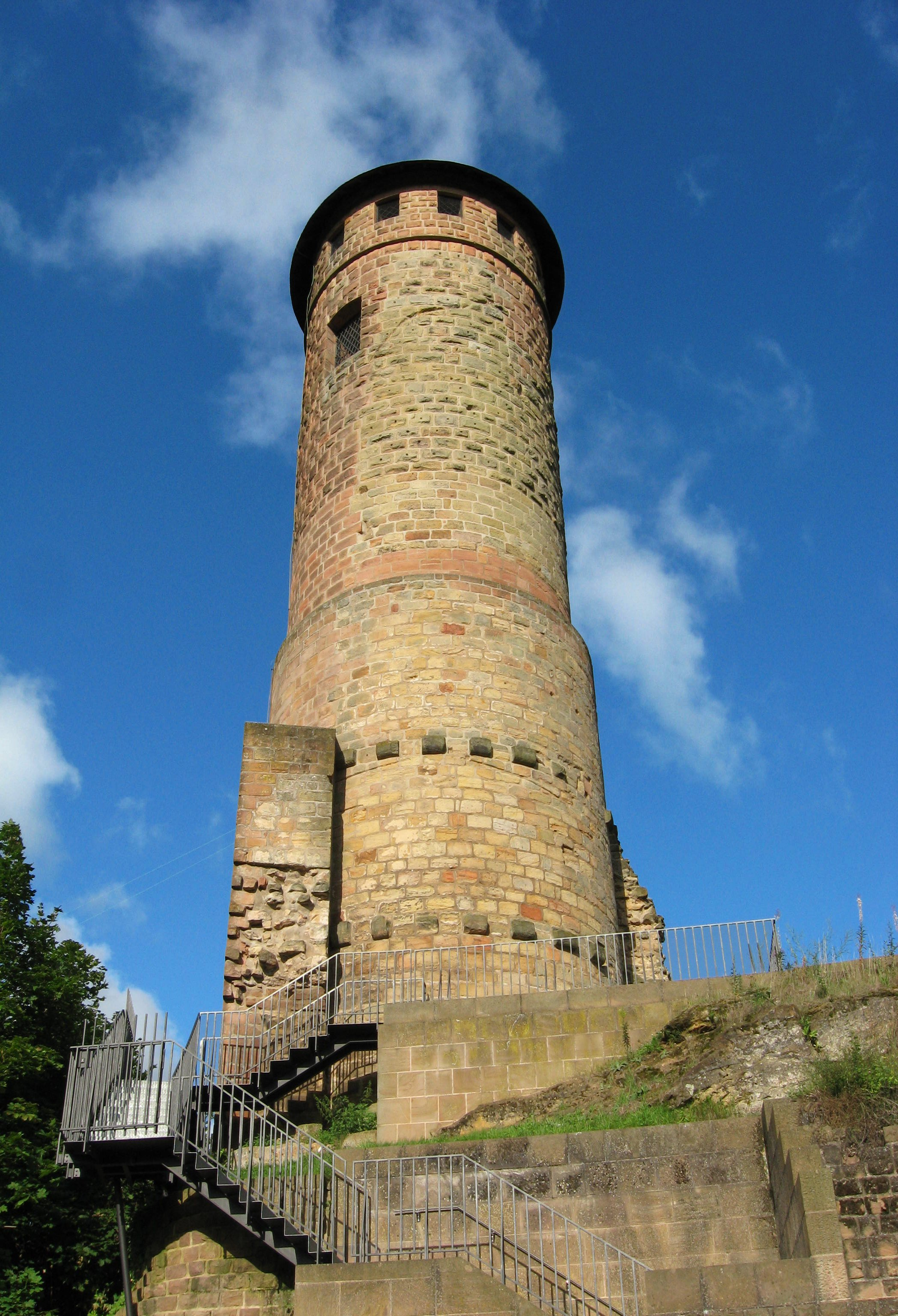

== History ==
=== Early History & Ownership ===
- The first documented mention of the castle dates to 1075, in connection with a Count Gottfried of Kirkel.
- During the early 12th century, Burg Kirkel passed into the hands of the Counts of Saarwerden.
- Between 1214 and 1386, the Herren von Kirkel (Lords of Kirkel) held the castle as an imperial fief (Reichslehen), achieving imperial immediacy.
- After the extinction of the Kirkel line in 1386, the castle eventually passed to the Dukes of Palatinate–Zweibrücken.

=== Transformation & Decline ===
- Between 1580 and 1596, Duke John I, Count Palatine of Zweibrücken converted parts of the medieval fortress into a residential palace in the Renaissance style
- Thirty Years' War (1618–1648) caused repeated damage, leading to partial abandonment.
- In 1677, during the Franco-Dutch War, the castle was severely damaged by fire.
- The final destruction occurred in 1689, during the War of the Palatine Succession (Nine Years’ War), after which the site was largely abandoned. Burg Kirkel, being a strategic hilltop fortress in Saarland, was attacked and largely demolished during this campaign in 1689. Its defensive structures and residential buildings were heavily damaged.
- By around 1740, the ruins were repurposed as a stone quarry, and many of the walls were dismantled for building material.

=== Archaeology & Restoration ===
- Archaeological excavations have been underway since 1994, supported by local authorities and the Förderkreis Kirkeler Burg (Kirkel Castle Support Association).
- A major investigation into the buried castle well began in 2015, believed to date back to the 15th or 16th century.
- Geophysical prospection reports by the Saarland State Monument Office revealed subsurface structures reflecting the castle's late-17th-century layout.

== Architecture ==
=== Tower & Defensive Structures ===
- The most visible remnant is the round bergfried, rebuilt in 1955 with a conical roof.
- Historic and archaeological data indicate a complex layout with curtain walls, a Zwinger (outer ward), and a gate system connected to a lower bailey.
- Excavations uncovered foundation remains of a well tower (Brunnenturm) on the northern spur.

=== Residential Structures ===
- The core included a palas (residential hall) and kitchen; the early phase featured a semi-circular hall and separate kitchen.
- In later expansions, the palas was remodeled; by the 15th century, a polygonal bergfried replaced earlier structures.
- Today, only foundations remain, but excavation and historical plans allow reconstruction of the layout.

== Cultural Significance & Modern Use ==
Burg Kirkel plays an active role in the cultural life of the region. Each year, the castle hosts the Kirkeler Burgsommer, a summer festival featuring medieval workshops, artisan demonstrations, and historical reenactments that allow visitors to experience aspects of daily life in the castle and its surroundings.

The Heimat- & Burgmuseum Kirkel, located at the foot of the castle, exhibits archaeological finds, detailed models, and historical reconstructions that illustrate the castle's development and everyday life during its occupation. The museum's collections include materials recovered through extensive excavations, including medieval artifacts and reconstructions of the palas and defensive structures.

Excavation efforts, as well as the work of the Förderkreis Kirkeler Burg e.V., have been instrumental in preserving the ruins, conducting research, and facilitating public engagement with the site. Their efforts ensure that both the archaeological remains and the cultural heritage of Burg Kirkel are maintained for future generations.

== Timeline ==
Date / Period	Event
1075	First documented mention of Burg Kirkel.
12th century	Functioned as a Reichsfeste (imperial stronghold).
1214–1386	Held by the Herren von Kirkel as an imperial fief (Reichslehen).
1580–1596	Duke John I of Palatinate-Zweibrücken remodels castle into a residential palace.
1635	Castle severely damaged during the Thirty Years' War.
1677	Destructive fire during Franco-Dutch War.
1689	During the Nine Years' War (War of the Palatine Succession), Burg Kirkel, a strategic hilltop fortress controlling the medieval Geleitstraße, was attacked and largely destroyed by French troops. Its defensive structures and residential buildings were heavily damaged, marking the castle's final military use.
circa 1740	Ruins used as stone quarry.
1955	Reconstruction of round tower (bergfried) for observation.
1990–1991	Archaeological sondages begin, uncovering key structures.
2015	Geophysical study uncovers subsurface remains consistent with historic plans.
1988–present	Heimat- & Burgmuseum Kirkel operates in historic stable house.

== Visitor Information ==
- The ruins are open to the public year-round.
- Guided tours provide insight into architectural evolution and archaeological work.
- Seasonal events include the Burgsommer medieval festival and Christmas market.
