= Philippi Collection =

Coordinates: 49°17′10.932″N 7°13′17.08″E

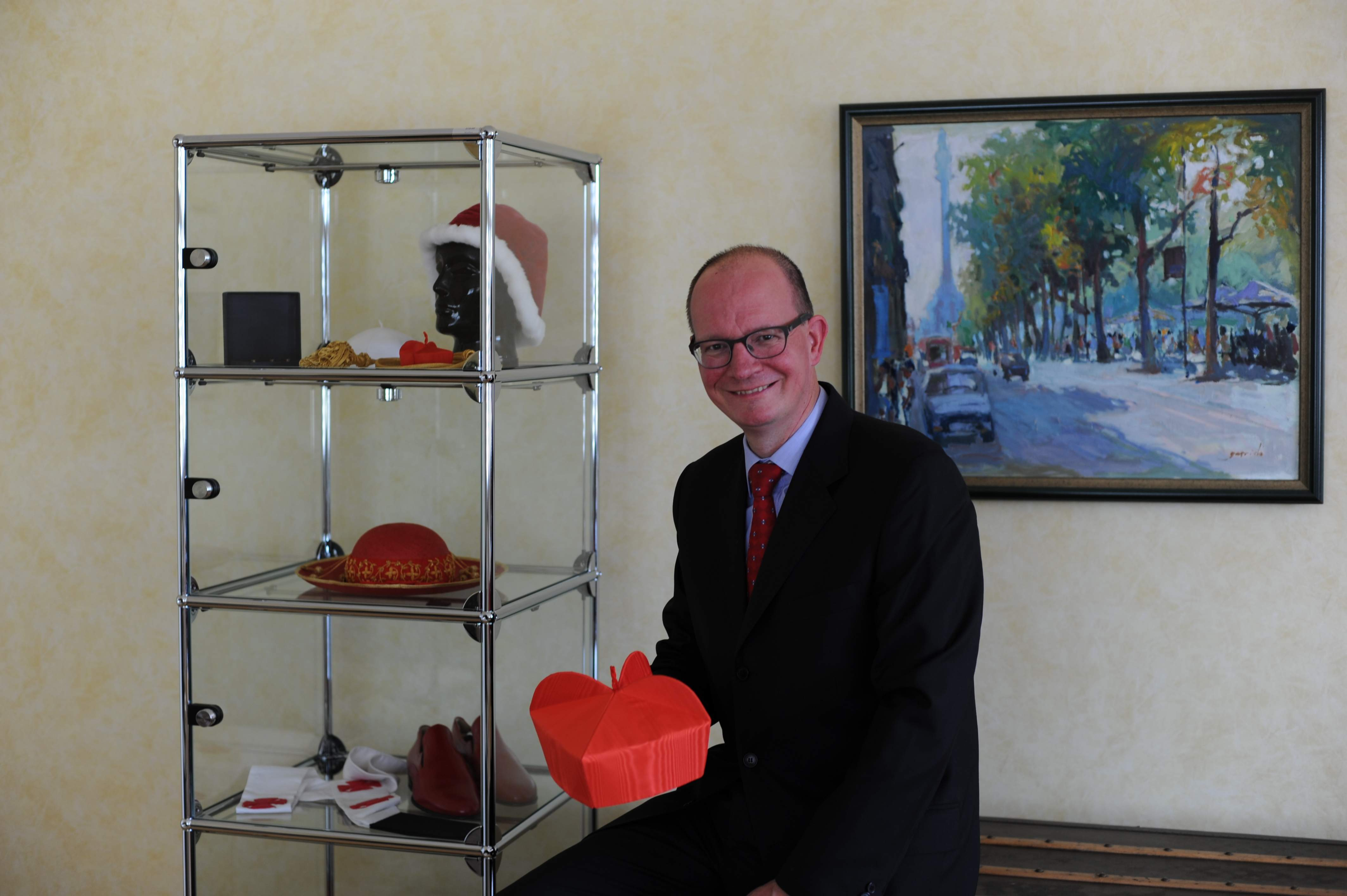
Dieter Philippi with the first piece of his collection: a cardinal's biretta made from scarlet watered silk

The Philippi Collection is a German private collection of clerical, religious and spiritual headdresses. The collection demonstrates the history, shared roots and diversity of religious-clerical head coverings.

== Description ==
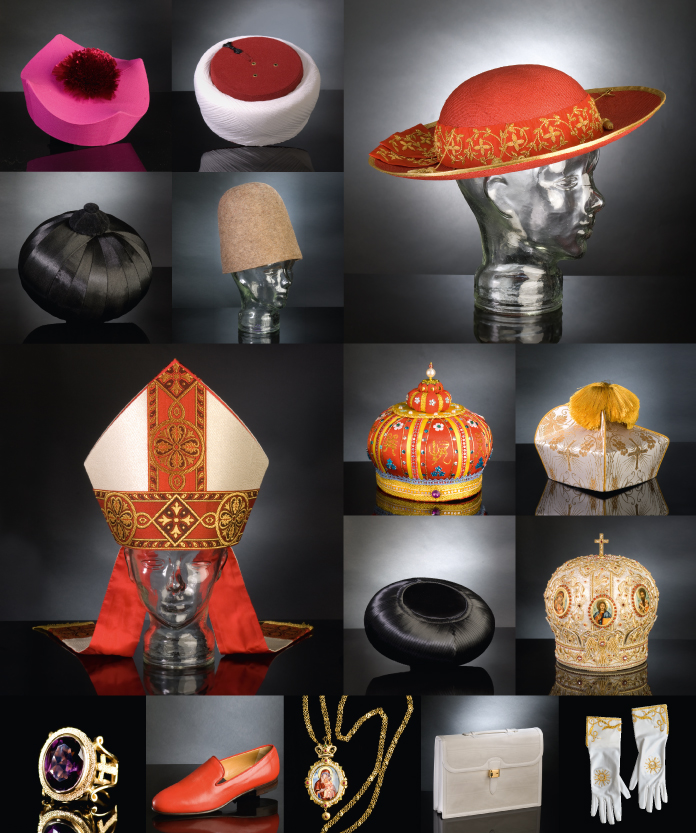
Selected items from the Philippi Collection

The Philippi Collection is a private collection assembled by the entrepreneur Dieter Philippi, CEO of a German telecommunication distributor, located in Kirkel.

The main focus of the collection is 500-plus examples of headgear, gathered from Christianity, Islam, Judaism, Caodaism, Shinto, Buddhism, Sikhism, Free Churches, Sufism, Anabaptism and further communities of faith.

The collection also contains more than 100 accessories used for clerical and ecclesiastic purposes. Among these are pontifical shoes, gloves, pallia, pectoral crosses, bishops and Ecclesiastical rings, pieces of the papal china, and sashes. The collection contains 52 pectoral cross-cords.

== Location ==
As of 2021, the collection is not on public display. It is located at Kirkel in Saarland, Germany.

== Exhibitions ==
- October 2010 – July 2011: The Deutsches Hygiene-Museum had a small part of the collection on display as part of its exhibition Religious Energy (Kraftwerk Religion).
- March – April 2011: Headquarters of the Savings Bank in Saarbrücken
- July 3 – October 30, 2011: Alles Kopfsache – Hut, Helm, Tuch & Co., LWL- Industriemuseum Henrichtsütte, Hattingen

== See also ==
- Mitre
- Zucchetto
