= Burg Bucherbach =

Ruin of a moated castle in Köllerbach, a district of Püttlingen

- Püttlingen, Köllerbach in Germany
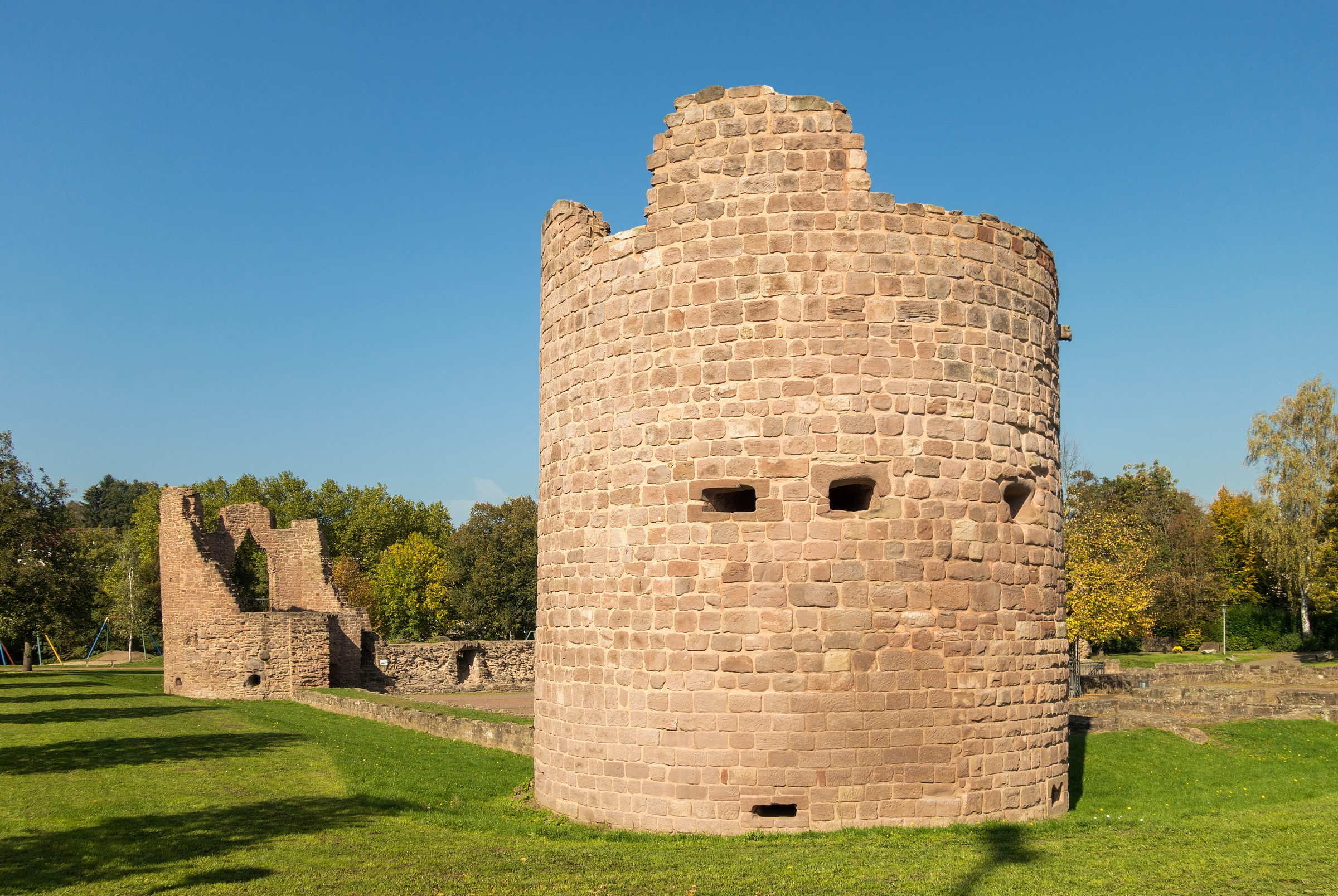

Site information
- Condition: Restored perimeter walls

Location
- Coordinates: 49.30018°N 6.897118°E

Site history
- Built: 13th to 14th Century

Burg Bucherbach, or Bucherbach Castle in English, is the ruin of a moated castle in Köllerbach, a district of Püttlingen in the Saarbrücken Region in Germany. Along with Kerpen Castle near Illingen, it is the most important lowland castle in Saarland.

== History ==
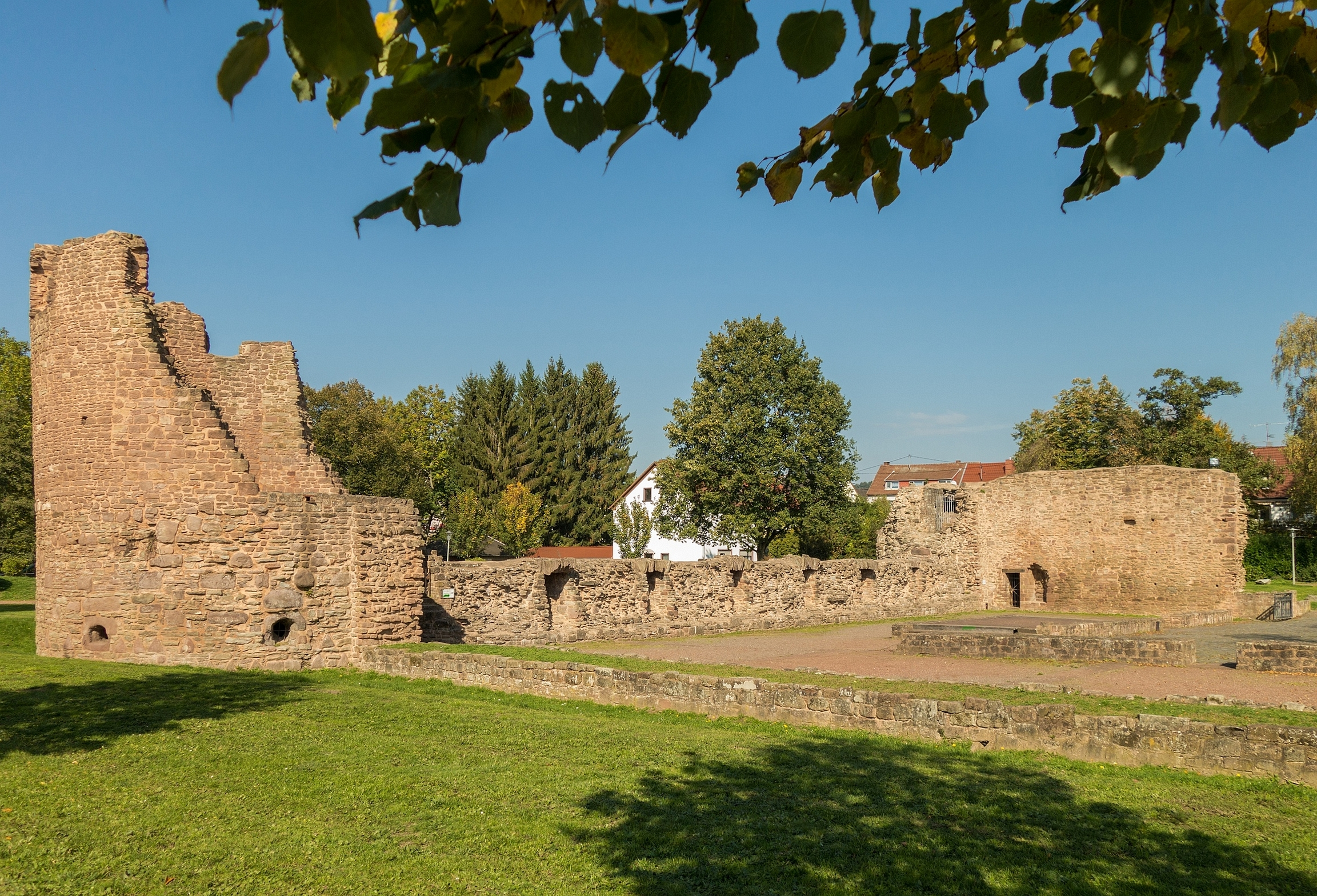
Bucherbach Castle, remains of the outer walls

Burg Bucherbach was built by the Counts of Saarbrücken to secure their rule in the region. The castle was first mentioned in a document in 1326 in an inheritance agreement as "maison dou val de cologne" (German: House in the Köller Valley), when Count John I pledged the County of Saarbrücken, with the exception of Saarbrücken and Bucherbach castles, to Archbishop Baldwin of Trier.

In 1412, Philip I of Nassau-Saarbrücken designated Burgelebach Castle as the widow's residence of his wife, Elisabeth of Lorraine-Vaudémont.

In a dispute with Duke Ludwig the Black of Palatinate-Zweibrücken, John II of Nassau-Saarbrücken placed the complex under the protection of Count Palatine Frederick the Victorious in 1460.

Under Philip II, the castle underwent extensive renovations around the mid-16th century, before being devastated in 1627 during the Thirty Years' War by Imperial troops under the command of Count Kratz von Scharfenstein. Although it was rebuilt in 1645, after being burned down again, it was subsequently only leased out as a manorial estate.

In 1740, the castle was described as derelict; all the walls and towers were still standing, but without a roof. Prince Wilhelm Heinrich of Nassau-Saarbrücken gave it to the inhabitants of the surrounding villages to use as a quarry. During the French Revolution, the remaining buildings and lands were confiscated as national property and leased out.

After an initial renovation of the castle ruins took place in 1930, a major restoration followed most recently in 1983/84. Excavations in 1983 unearthed the foundations as well as old weapons and medieval everyday objects.

In 2011, the castle ruins were renovated again under the direction of the interest group Burg Bucherbach eV.

== Description ==
The castle is an almost square structure with an inner side length of approximately 40 meters and four round corner towers, each about ten meters in diameter. All but the east tower have been preserved to a considerable height. The building's structure largely dates back to the 16th-century reconstruction, which apparently incorporated the foundations of the 14th-century structure. During this reconstruction, the defensive character was lost; for example, three large window jambs were cut into the middle floor of the west tower, and a loggia was added facing the vineyard. A grand residential building stood between the south and east towers, with access to the castle via the now-filled ditches .

Today, the castle is owned by the Püttlingen town. Numerous festivals and markets (Christmas market, medieval market, wine festival, farmers' market, concerts, etc.) take place in the castle grounds every year.
