= Mandelbachtal =

- Municipality
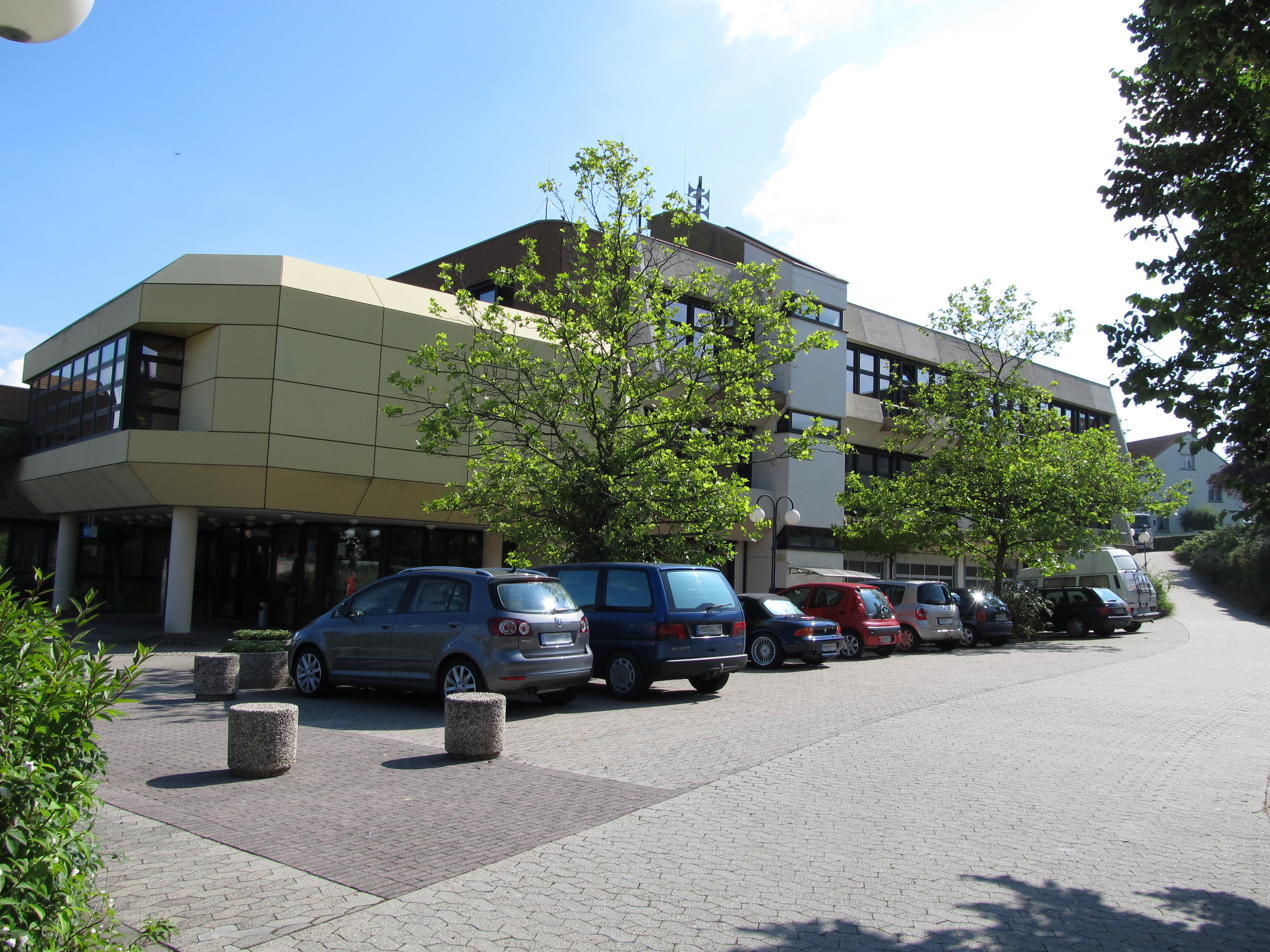
- Town hall in Ormesheim

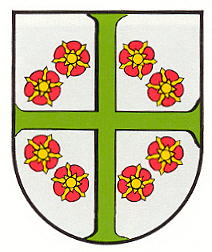
- Coat of arms

- Location of Mandelbachtal within Saarpfalz district
- Interactive map of Mandelbachtal
- Location within Germany Location within Saarland
- Coordinates: 49°10′N 7°10′E
- Country: Germany
- State: Saarland
- District: Saarpfalz

Government
  - Mayor (2019–29): Maria Vermeulen (SPD)

Area
  - Total: 57.71 km^{2} (22.28 sq mi)
- Elevation: 450 m (1,480 ft)

Population (2025-12-31)
  - Total: 10,719
  - Density: 185.7/km^{2} (481.1/sq mi)
- Time zone: UTC+01:00 (CET)
  - Summer (DST): UTC+02:00 (CEST)
- Postal codes: 66399
- Dialling codes: 06803 06804 06893
- Vehicle registration: HOM
- Website: www.mandelbachtal.de

Mandelbachtal (German pronunciation: [ˈmandl̩baxˌtaːl], lit. 'Mandelbach Valley') is a municipality in the Saarpfalz district, in Saarland, Germany. It is situated near the border with France, approx. 15 km southeast of Saarbrücken. Its capital is Ormesheim.

== Community organization ==
Mandelbachtal is composed of the communities of Bebelsheim, Bliesmengen-Bolchen, Erfweiler-Ehlingen, Habkirchen, Heckendalheim, Ommersheim, Ormesheim, and Wittersheim.

== Name ==
The municipality of Mandelbachtal was formed in 1974. The name is derived from the valley of the Mandelbach, in which four of the eight communities composing the town are located: Erfweiler-Ehlingen, Wittersheim, Bebelsheim und Habkirchen. From the headwaters to the mouth of the Mandelbach there are many pollarded willows, Kopfweiden, also called Korbweiden ("basket willows"). From the shoots of these willows in previous centuries people wove baskets necessary for local agriculture. Because the willow leaves resembled those of the almond the tree was colloquially called Mandelbaum ("almond"). This is where the neighboring stream of the Mandelbach derived its name. Near the confluence of the Mandelbach and the Blies there was formerly a town named Mandelbach, first recorded in 1239, which is today a neighborhood of Habkirchen. In 1974, during the reform of administrative districts in Saarland, today's Mandelbachtal was formed by the consolidation of eight formerly independent communities.
