= Kirkel =

- Municipality
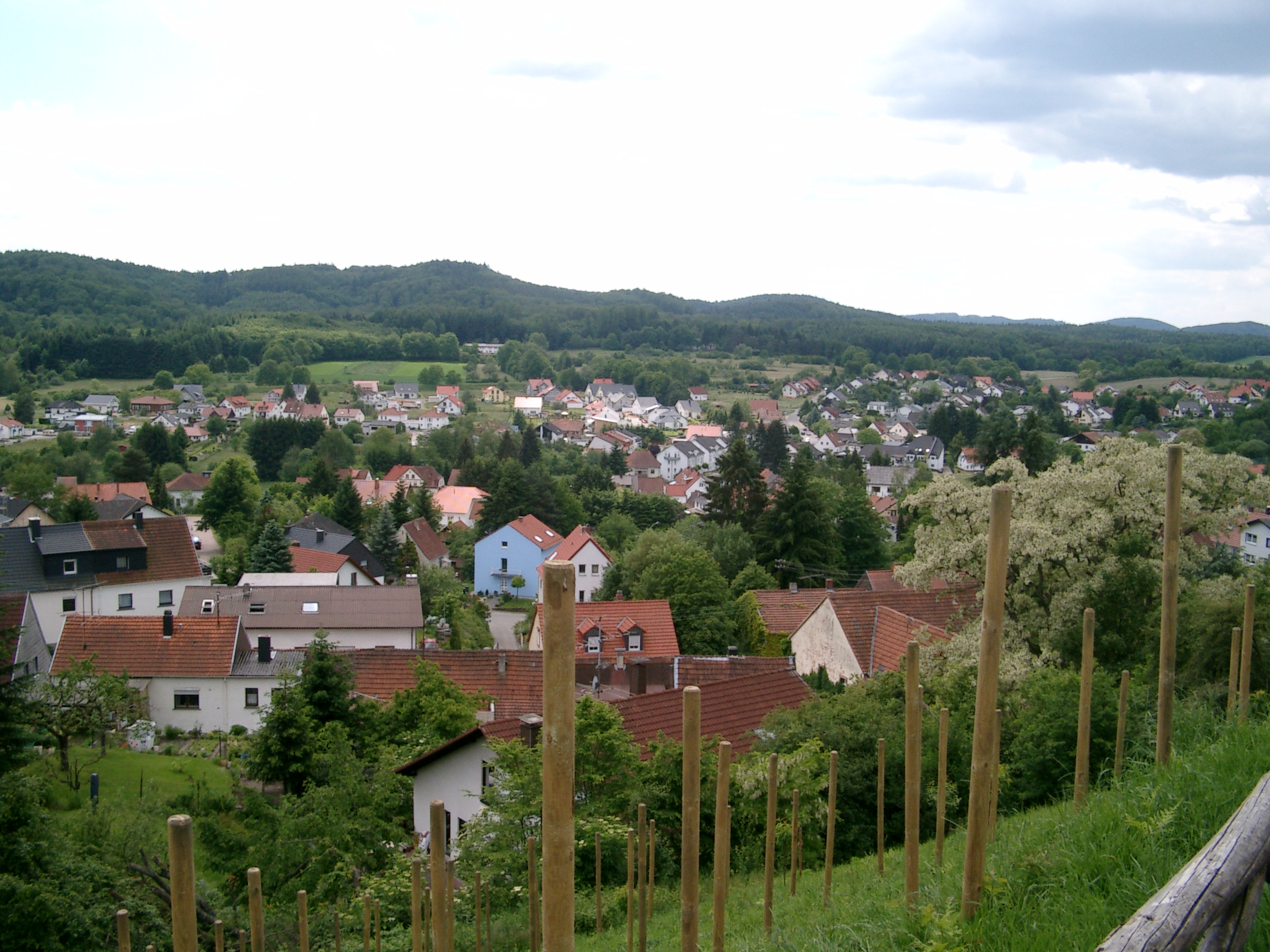

- Coat of arms

- Location of Kirkel within Saarpfalz district
- Interactive map of Kirkel
- Location within Germany Location within Saarland
- Coordinates: 49°17′N 7°14′E
- Country: Germany
- State: Saarland
- District: Saarpfalz

Government
  - Mayor (2024–34): Dominik Hochlenert (CDU)

Area
  - Total: 31.34 km^{2} (12.10 sq mi)
- Elevation: 225–381 m (738–1,250 ft)

Population (2025-12-31)
  - Total: 10,104
  - Density: 322.4/km^{2} (835.0/sq mi)
- Time zone: UTC+01:00 (CET)
  - Summer (DST): UTC+02:00 (CEST)
- Postal codes: 66459
- Vehicle registration: HOM
- Website: www.kirkel.eu

Kirkel (German pronunciation: [ˈkɪʁkl̩]) is a municipality in the Saarpfalz district in Saarland, Germany. It is situated approximatively 8 km southeast of Neunkirchen, and 20 km east/northeast of Saarbrücken.

== Overview ==
A rather well-preserved castle ruin is located a few hundred metres from the town centre. The small Kirkel castle was built in 1075 and is the town's landmark. Located on top of a small castle hill, and due to its large tower with 169 steps to the top, it can be seen from a great distance. Kirkel has the densest forest range in whole Saarland region.

Kirkel celebrates festivals more than any other place in the area. Among the most famous events was the "Wurstmarkt" around August, which lasted for five days with a proper beer festival. As of 2014, no more Wurstmarkts are being held in Kirkel.

== Attractions ==
- Philippi Collection
