= Saarpfalz-Kreis =

Coordinates: 49°15′N 7°15′E

Saarpfalz
- District
- Flag Coat of arms
- Country: Germany
- State: Saarland
- Capital: Homburg

Government
  - District admin.: Theophil Gallo (SPD)

Area
  - Total: 418.53 km^{2} (161.60 sq mi)

Population (31 December 2024)
  - Total: 144,092
  - Density: 340/km^{2} (890/sq mi)
- Time zone: UTC+01:00 (CET)
  - Summer (DST): UTC+02:00 (CEST)
- Vehicle registration: HOM and IGB
- Website: saarpfalz-kreis.de

Saarpfalz (Saar-Palatinate) is a Kreis (district) in the south-east of the Saarland, Germany. Neighboring districts are (from west clockwise) Saarbrücken, Neunkirchen, Kusel, Kaiserslautern, Südwestpfalz, district-free Zweibrücken, and the French département Moselle in Lorraine.

== History ==
After the Treaty of Versailles, the Saar basin was placed under the administration of the League of Nations for 15 years. The Palatinate area, then part of Bavaria, was therefore split in two parts. The part which went into the Saar became commonly known as Saarpfalz, and was administered by the two Bezirksamt St. Ingbert and Homburg. The Saarpfalz district was created in 1974 when the St. Ingbert and Homburg districts were merged. Since 1997 the district has had a partnership with Henrico County, Virginia.

== Coat of arms ==
The lion in the top left is the symbol of the Palatinate (Pfalz), the cross in the top right is the symbol of Trier, both owned a large part of the district in the past. The crosier is the bottom left represents the clerical possessions of the monasteries, while the silver lion in the bottom right is the symbol of the county of Homburg.

== Towns and municipalities ==
Clickable map of towns and municipalities in the district

Towns (Population as of 2015)
1. Bexbach (17,769)
2. Blieskastel (21,033)
3. Homburg (Saar) (41,974)
4. Sankt Ingbert (36,292)
Municipalities (Population as of 2015)
1. Gersheim (6,565)
2. Kirkel (10,104)
3. Mandelbachtal (10,847)
