= Freistroff =

- Commune
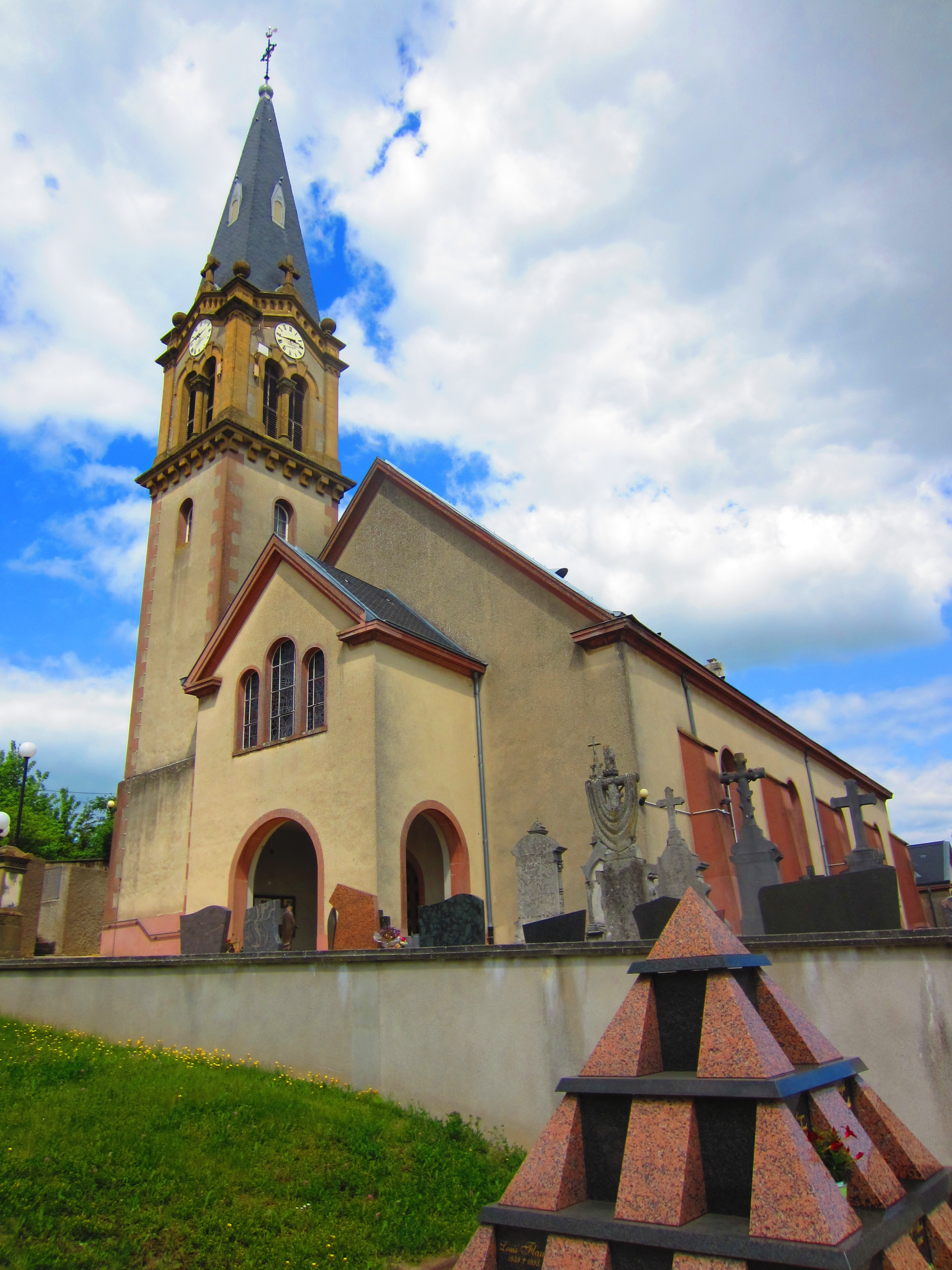
- The church in Freistroff

- Coat of arms
- Location of Freistroff
- Location within France Location within Grand Est
- Coordinates: 49°16′57″N 6°29′31″E
- Country: France
- Region: Grand Est
- Department: Moselle
- Arrondissement: Forbach-Boulay-Moselle
- Canton: Bouzonville
- Intercommunality: Bouzonvillois - Trois Frontières

Government
  - Mayor (2020–2026): Christian Schwartz
- Area^{1}: 14.67 km^{2} (5.66 sq mi)
- Elevation: 200 m (660 ft)
- Highest elevation: 276 m (906 ft)
- Lowest elevation: 195 m (640 ft)
- Population (2023): 1,000
  - Density: 68/km^{2} (180/sq mi)
- Time zone: UTC+01:00 (CET)
  - Summer (DST): UTC+02:00 (CEST)
- INSEE/Postal code: 57235 /57320
- ^{1} French Land Register data, which excludes lakes, ponds, glaciers > 1 km^{2} (0.386 sq mi or 247 acres) and river estuaries.

Freistroff (French pronunciation: [fʁaistʁɔf]; German: Freisdorf; Lorraine Franconian: Freeschdroff) is a commune in the Moselle department in Grand Est in north-eastern France.

Localities of the commune: Diding (German: Didingen), Guiching.

== See also ==
- Communes of the Moselle department
