= Vaucourt =

- Commune
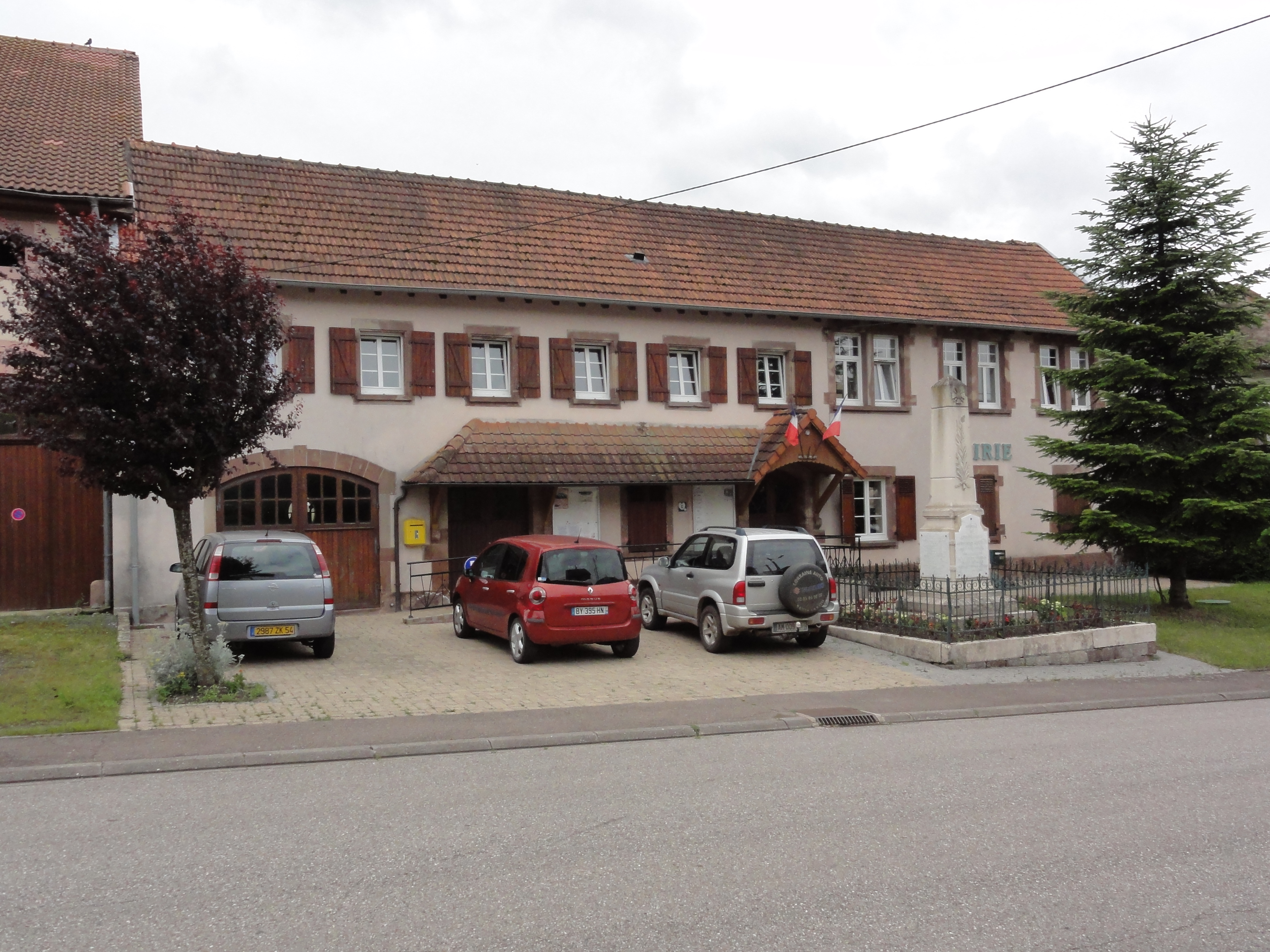
- The town hall in Vaucourt

- Coat of arms
- Location of Vaucourt
- Location within France Location within Grand Est
- Coordinates: 48°40′13″N 6°41′36″E
- Country: France
- Region: Grand Est
- Department: Meurthe-et-Moselle
- Arrondissement: Lunéville
- Canton: Baccarat
- Intercommunality: Vezouze en Piémont

Government
  - Mayor (2020–2026): Michaël Thuot
- Area^{1}: 6.29 km^{2} (2.43 sq mi)
- Elevation: 260 m (850 ft)
- Highest elevation: 296 m (971 ft)
- Lowest elevation: 230 m (750 ft)
- Population (2023): 64
  - Density: 10/km^{2} (26/sq mi)
- Time zone: UTC+01:00 (CET)
  - Summer (DST): UTC+02:00 (CEST)
- INSEE/Postal code: 54551 /54370
- ^{1} French Land Register data, which excludes lakes, ponds, glaciers > 1 km^{2} (0.386 sq mi or 247 acres) and river estuaries.

Vaucourt (French pronunciation: [vokuʁ]) is a commune in the Meurthe-et-Moselle department in north-eastern France.

== See also ==
- Communes of the Meurthe-et-Moselle department
